= Open Air School (Columbus, Ohio) =

- U.S. National Register of Historic Places
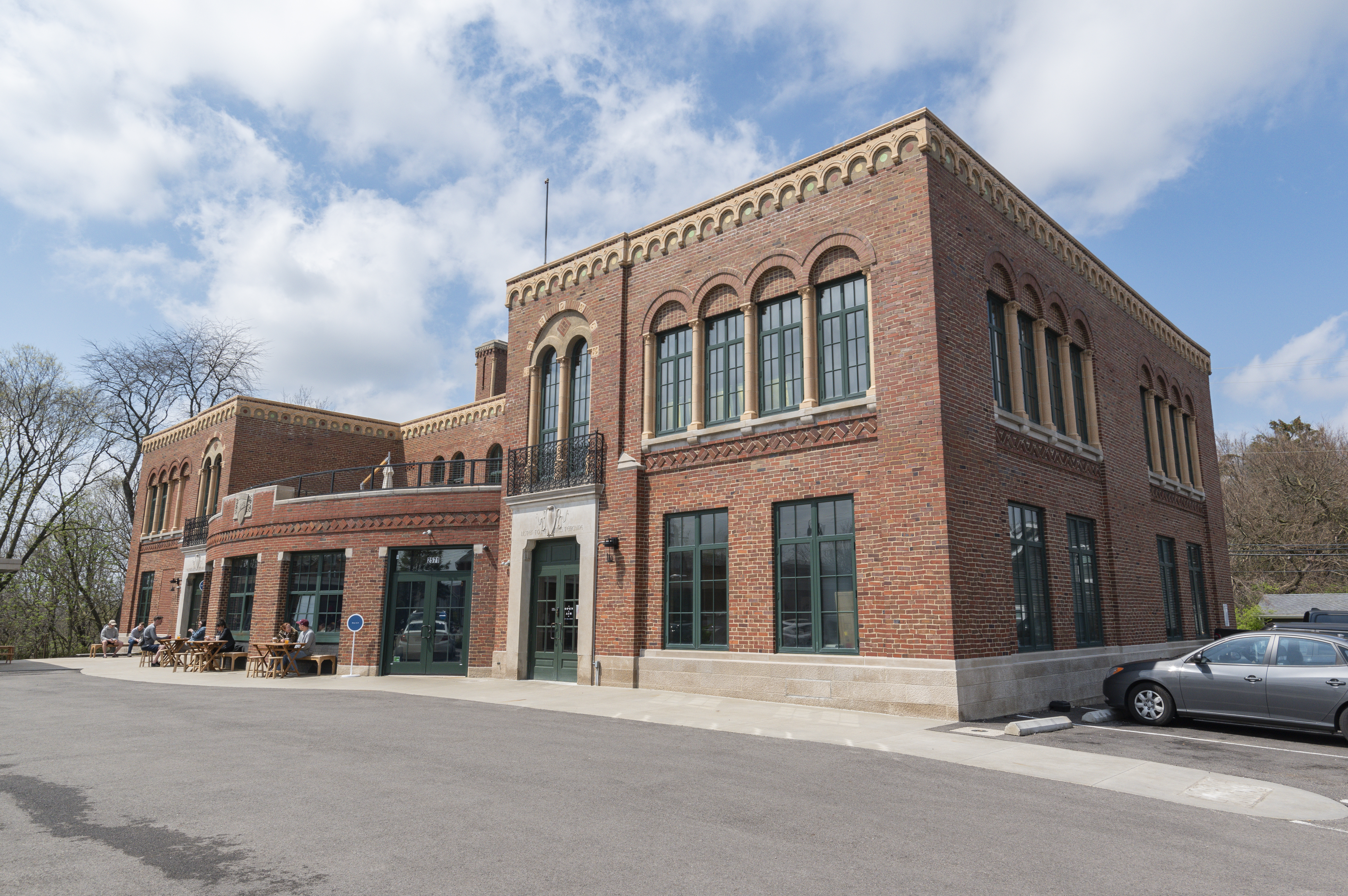
- Interactive map highlighting the building's location
- Location: 2571 Neil Ave., Columbus, Ohio
- Coordinates: 40.014509°N 83.014094°W
- Area: 1.2 acres (0.49 ha)
- Built: 1927
- Architect: Howard Dwight Smith
- Architectural style: Italian Renaissance Revival
- NRHP reference No.: 100004054
- Added to NRHP: June 14, 2019

The Open Air School is a historic building in the Tuttle Park area of Old North Columbus in Columbus, Ohio. The building was constructed as a school, and today houses local a café, bar, a fitness center, and event space. It was listed on the National Register of Historic Places in 2019.

The former open air school building first housed students at risk of catching tuberculosis. Because of this, the building has large windows, gathering spaces, outdoor areas, and nearby wilderness. It replaced an older open air school building on the site, built in 1913. The 1927 building subsequently held Neil Avenue Elementary, from 1956 to 1975. It then held Columbus City Schools administrative offices, and later sat vacant for years. Around 2019, a $6.1-million renovation plan was announced, for the site to hold a mix of businesses. Proposed tenants included a coffee shop, fitness center, a restaurant, and offices. In 2022, a local brewery opened a restaurant and bar, called Understory, on-site.

The 30,586 sq ft (2,841.5 m^{2}) building sits on 1.2 acres (0.49 ha). It was designed by Howard Dwight Smith, architect of the Ohio Stadium, and was built in 1927. Its Italian Renaissance Revival style is constructed of reinforced concrete and has a brick and terra cotta facade.

== See also ==
- National Register of Historic Places listings in Columbus, Ohio
- Schools in Columbus, Ohio
