= Charles S. Barrett Building =

- U.S. National Register of Historic Places
- Columbus Register of Historic Properties
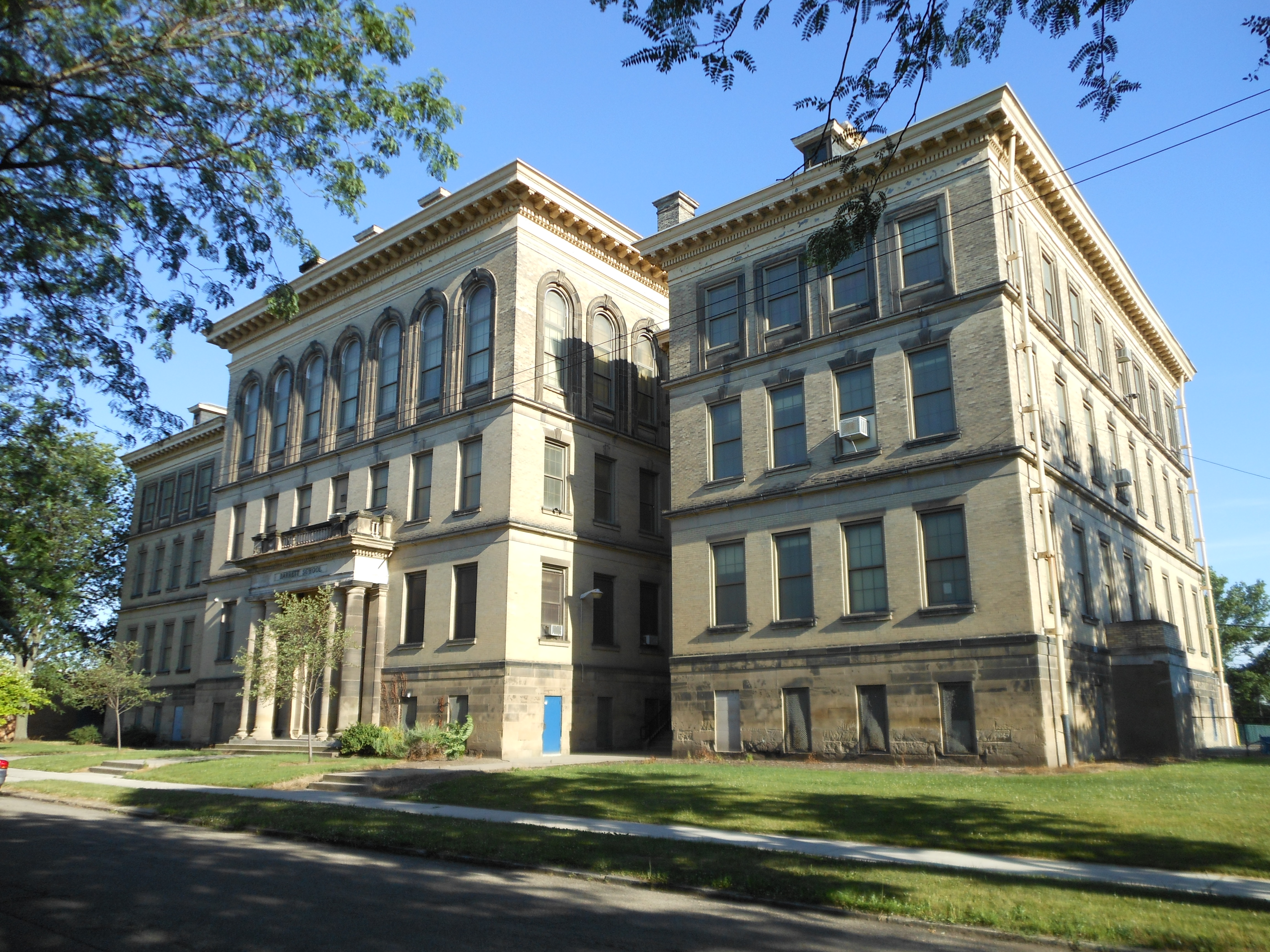
- Interactive map highlighting the building's location
- Location: 345 E. Deshler Avenue, Columbus, Ohio
- Coordinates: 39.940278°N 82.986944°W
- Built: 1900
- Architect: David Riebel
- NRHP reference No.: 15000561
- CRHP No.: CR-59

Significant dates
- Added to NRHP: September 1, 2015
- Designated CRHP: September 25, 2006

The Charles S. Barrett Building is a historic building in the Merion Village neighborhood of Columbus, Ohio. It was listed on the Columbus Register of Historic Properties in 2006 and the National Register of Historic Places in 2015. The building was completed in 1900 as the home of the city's South High School, part of the Columbus Public School District. It has since been converted into apartments, rented out as The Barrett.

The four-story Italianate school building was designed by David Riebel, as his second school building commission in the neighborhood, after Southwood Elementary School. The South High School building was modeled after the now-demolished East High School at 1390 Franklin Avenue, designed by Riebel about a year earlier. It was redeveloped into apartments in the mid-2010s. A nonprofit housing agency worked with a local developer to build housing around the school building, with a total of 108 apartments and 22 single-family homes. The school building itself was converted into 52 apartments, and its 1960s addition was demolished.

== See also ==
- National Register of Historic Places listings in Columbus, Ohio
- Schools in Columbus, Ohio
