= Avondale Elementary School =

Historic school building in Columbus, Ohio

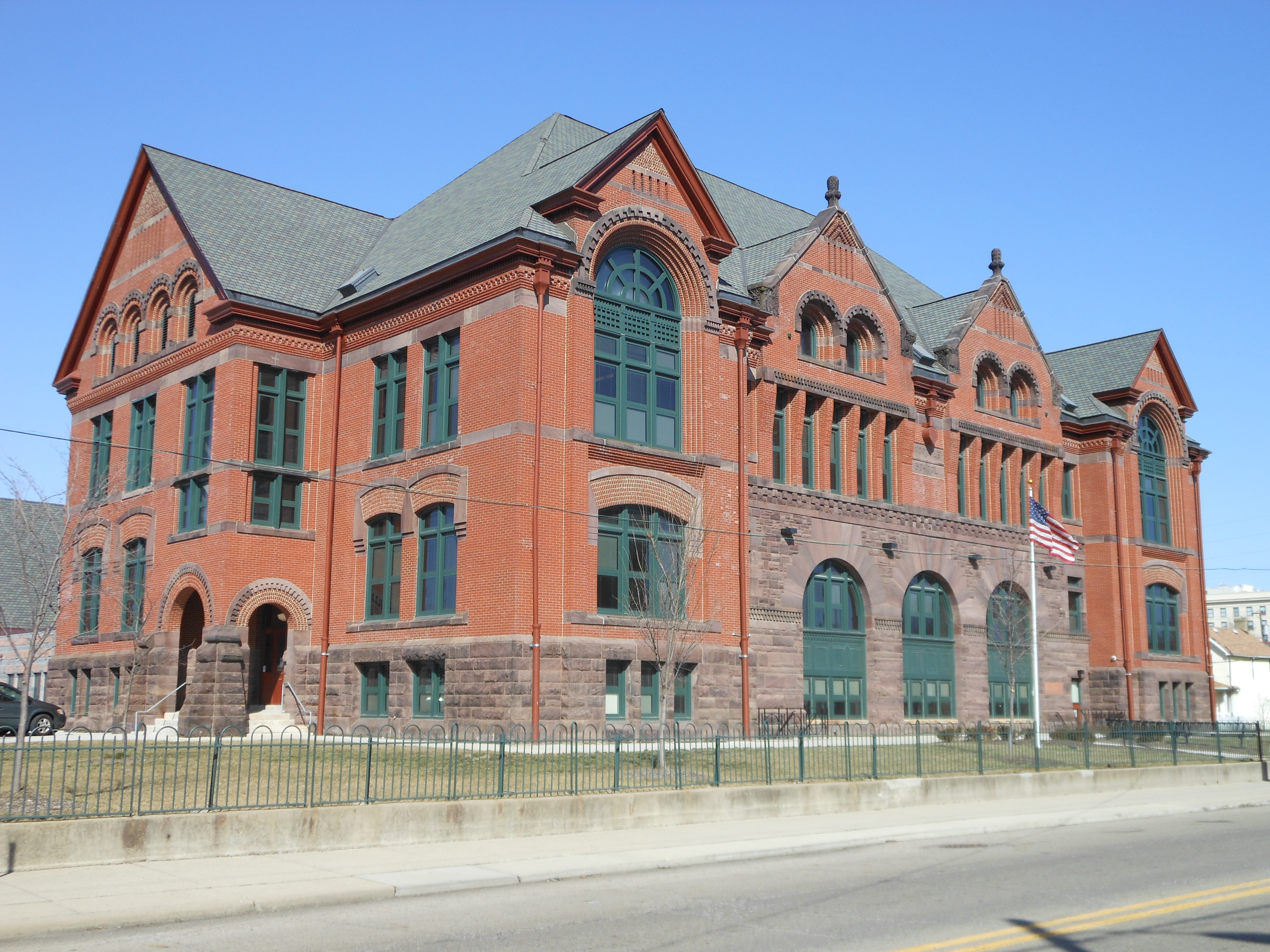
- Location: 141 Hawkes Avenue, Columbus, Ohio
- Coordinates: 39.956098°N 83.025783°W
- Built: 1893
- Architect: David Riebel
- Architectural style(s): Richardsonian Romanesque
- Owner: Columbus City Schools

Avondale Elementary School is a historic school building in the Franklinton neighborhood of Columbus, Ohio. The building was built in the Richardsonian Romanesque style in 1893, having been designed by prolific Columbus architect David Riebel.

== History ==
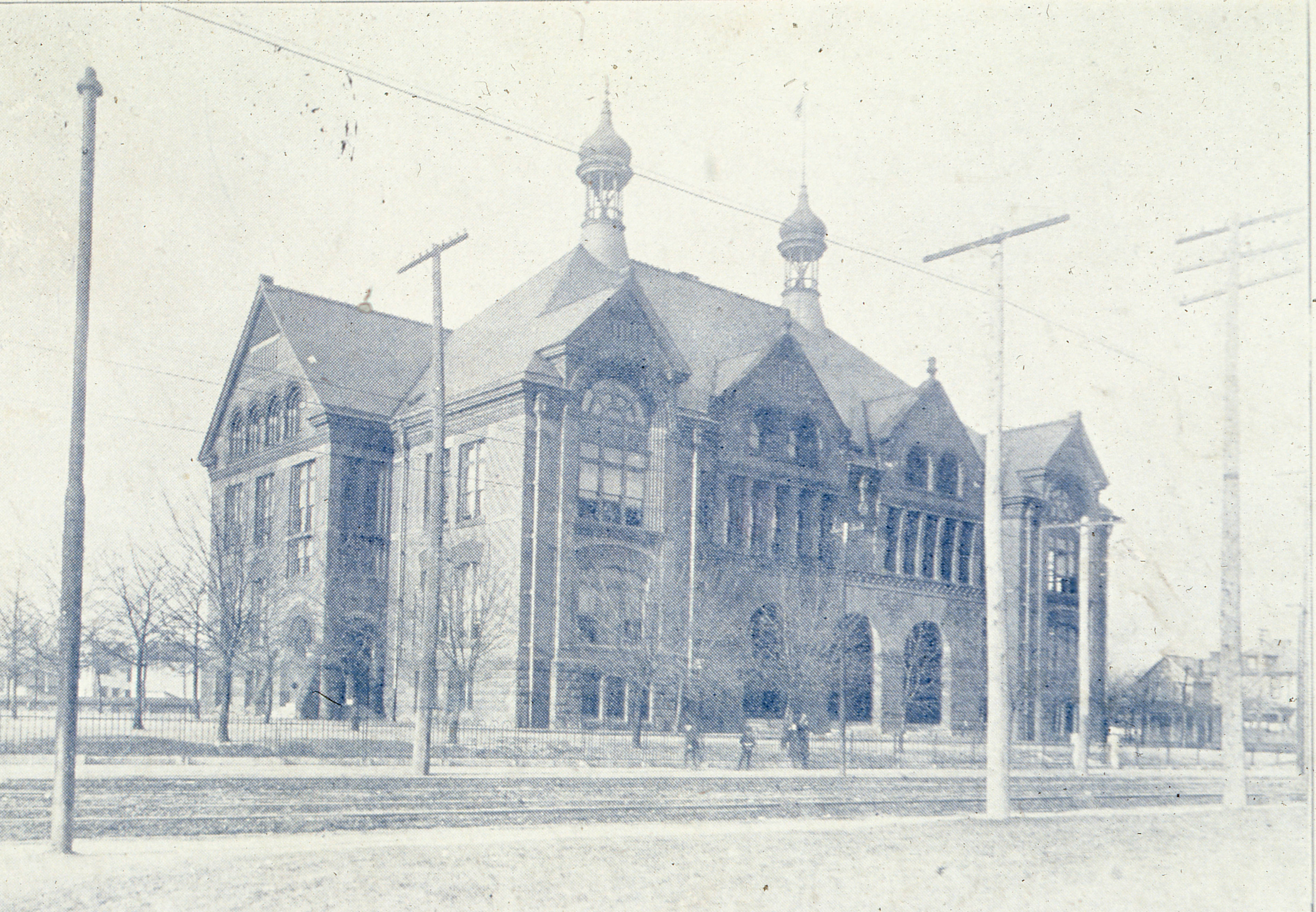
The school in 1908

Avondale Elementary School was built at a time of significant population growth in Columbus. Following the American Civil War, an influx of new residents led the school board to construct new schools nearly every year. The Avondale school was built from 1892 to 1893, toward the end of popularity for the Richardsonian Romanesque architectural style.

== Architecture ==
The building was designed by prolific Columbus-area architect David Riebel. Riebel was hired as the first Columbus Public Schools architect in 1893. The building was one of a few, including Medary Avenue Elementary School, designed by Riebel before he became the lead architect for Columbus City Schools. It was considered one of the most ornamental and expensive school buildings in Columbus by 1904.

The structure is made of rock-faced limestone and brick. It has elements of the Richardsonian Romanesque style, especially in its roof gables. They are made of brick, with contrasting stone trim in its window arches and frames, as well as in its belt courses and copings.

== See also ==
- Schools in Columbus, Ohio
