= Schools in Columbus, Ohio =

This is a list of public school buildings in Columbus, Ohio, of historical or architectural importance to the Columbus Public School District. Items are listed by opening date.

Year completed	Name	Image	Location	Status	Notes
1808	Franklinton School		W. Broad and Sandusky	Demolished	Second school for Franklinton, housed in the county courthouse after the court moved to Columbus in 1824; annexed into Columbus in 1872. Replaced by the 1878 Franklinton School.
1820	Columbus Academy		100 S. Third Street	Demolished	Moved to the southwest corner of Sugar (Chapel) Alley and Fourth around 1826, then the eastern limit of the city.
1833	Rich Street School / Hazelton School		Walnut and Third, southeast corner	Demolished	One-room schoolhouse. Considered Columbus's first public school building.
1845	Middle Building		Third near Rich	Demolished	Demolished in 1860, replaced with the Rich Street School
1845	North Building		Long and Third	Demolished	Addition made in 1853
1845	South Building		Mound and Third	Demolished	178 ft × 24 ft (54.3 m × 7.3 m) structure. Addition made in 1853. Replaced by Mound Street School.
1852	German-English School		Fourth and Court	In use	Also known as the German Central Grammar School, the Fulton Street German-English School, and the Central German School. Moved to 151 Jackson St., now a private residence with numerous additions.
1853	Old State Street School	More images	E. State near Fifth	Demolished	Replaced by the Sullivant School
1860	Rich Street School, Public School No. 3	More images	Third and Rich, northeast corner	Demolished	Later used as the Scioto Valley Traction Company interurban station
1861	Central High School / High School / High School of Commerce	More images	Sixth and Broad, southeast corner	Demolished	Additions made in 1876 and 1890. Closed in 1924; used for city offices until demolition in 1928.
1863	Fort Hayes Metropolitan Education Center	More images	546 Jack Gibbs Boulevard	See notes	Multi-school campus founded in 1976 on the 1863-2009 Fort Hayes U.S. Army post. Some 19th c. buildings remain; some have been replaced.
1863	Fourth Street Elementary School / Central Fulton / Public School No. 5	More images	400 S. Fourth Street	Demolished	South portion built in 1871; used by Heer Printing Company after construction of Mohawk Middle School in 1953; demolished in 1967.
1866	Park Street School / Opportunity School / Girls Trade School		Park and Vine, northwest corner	Demolished	Addition made in 1881
1866	Third Street School	More images	630 S. Third Street	In use	In use by the St. Mary School since 2020; formerly the Golden Hobby Shop
1868	Spring Street	More images	278 E. Spring Street	Demolished	
1868	Fulton Street School		450 E. Fulton Street	Demolished	Addition made in 1881. Replaced by Fulton Street Elementary School in 1922.
1871	Loving School		Long and Third	Demolished	Abandoned and sold in 1882
1871	Sullivant Elementary School / Normal School	More images	270 E. State Street	Demolished	Later served as district administration building. Replaced with new admin. building in 1960–61.
1873	North High Street School		N. High Street	Unknown	Suburban schoolhouse
1873	North Columbus School			Unknown	Suburban one-room schoolhouse
1873	Mount Airy School			Unknown	Suburban one-room schoolhouse
1873	Johnstown Road School		Johnstown Road	Unknown	Suburban one-room schoolhouse
1873	East Broad School		E. Broad Street	Unknown	Suburban one-room schoolhouse. Abandoned in 1875 and rented out.
1873	South High Street School		S. High Street	Unknown	Suburban one-room schoolhouse
1873	Friend Street School		E. Main and Miller	Unknown	Two-room schoolhouse.
1873	Mount Pleasant School			Unknown	Three-room building.
1873	First Avenue School	More images	929 Harrison Avenue	In use	Additions made in 1880 and 1890. In use as office space.
1873	Fieser Elementary School		335 W. State Street	Demolished	Additions made in 1875 and 1890
1874	Second Avenue Elementary School		68 E. Second Avenue	In use	Designed by Max Drach. Addition made in 1881 (pictured). Closed in 2006; long-term leased to Junior Achievement of Central Ohio in 2008.
1874	Stewart Alternative Elementary School / New Street School	More images	40 Stewart Avenue	In use	In use by Columbus City Schools. Designed by P. A. Schlapp. Addition made in 1892.
1876	Douglas Junior High School	More images	40 Douglas Street	Demolished	Replaced with newer school in 1976. School and street were often spelled "Douglass".
1876	East Main Street Elementary School / East Friend Street School		1469 E. Main Street	Demolished	Addition made in 1889. Demolished 1960 and replaced with the present-day main campus of the Columbus Collegiate Academy.
1879	Northwood School		2229 N. High Street / 5 W. Northwood Avenue	Demolished	Addition made in 1888. Levi Scofield design.
1880	Franklinton School	More images	666 W. Broad Street	Demolished	Addition made in 1887. Demolished in 1956.
1880	Mound Street School		110 E. Mound Street	Demolished	Replaced the South Building. J.T. Harris & Co. design.
1881	Garfield School	More images	825 Mt. Vernon Avenue	Demolished	Replaced with new school in 1955, now part of the King Arts Complex
1884	Beck Street School	More images	387 E. Beck Street	In use	Now the South Columbus Preparatory Academy. David Riebel design.
1885	Front Street School / Trades School		140 N. Front Street	Demolished	Demolished in 1918 for construction of the Downtown YMCA
1886	Fifth Avenue Elementary School	More images	Fifth Avenue and Highland, northwest corner	Demolished	Third floor and tower removed in 1954. Painted white, the building was somewhat unrecognizable by the time it was replaced by a new school in the 1970s.
1888	Siebert Street Elementary School		400 Siebert Street	Demolished	Replaced with a newer school
1888	Twenty-Third Street School / Mount Vernon Junior High School	More images	1235 Mt. Vernon Avenue	Demolished	Yost & Packard design.
1890	Eighth Avenue Elementary School		1435 Indianola Avene	Demolished	Addition built in 1906. Closed in 1952.
1890	Fair Avenue Elementary School	More images	1395 Fair Avenue	In use	Now in use as the A+ Arts Academy. Frank Packard design.
1891	Columbus Public School Library	More images	E. Town near High	Demolished	Yost & Packard design.
1892	Avondale Elementary School	More images	141 Hawkes Avenue	In use	In use by Columbus City Schools. David Riebel design.
1892	North Side High School / Everett Middle School / Columbus Gifted Academy	More images	100 W. Fourth Avenue	Demolished (original building); In use (additions)	Original by Kremer & Hart. C. 1899 addition by David Riebel. 1927 rebuilt original section by Howard Dwight Smith. Remaining portions in use by Columbus City Schools.
1892	Medary Avenue Elementary School	More images	2500 Medary Avenue	Vacant	Bridgeway Academy vacated in 2021. David Riebel design.
1893	Felton School / Felton Avenue Elementary School		920 Leonard Avenue	Demolished	David Riebel design.
1893	Ohio Avenue Elementary School / The Ohio Street School	More images	505 S. Ohio Avenue	In use	In use by Columbus City Schools. David Riebel design.
1894	Hubbard Avenue School / Hubbard Mastery School	More images	104 W. Hubbard Avenue	In use	In use by Columbus City Schools. David Riebel design.
1894	Milo Elementary School	More images	617 E. 3rd Avenue	In use	Home to Milo Arts since 1988. John M. Freese design.
1894	Southwood Elementary School	More images	1500 S. Fourth Street	In use	In use by Columbus City Schools. David Riebel design.
1895	Highland Avenue Elementary School	More images	40 S. Highland Avenue	In use	In use by Columbus City Schools. David Riebel design.
1897	Chicago Avenue School		40 Chicago Avenue	In use	Operated by Franklinton Prep High School. David Riebel design.
1897	Ninth Avenue Elementary School		221 W. 9th Avenue	Demolished	David Riebel design.
1899	East High School / Franklin Junior High School		1402 Franklin Avenue	Demolished	Torn down during construction of Franklin Alternative Middle School in 1977. David Riebel design. Additions from 1953 and 1967 still stand.
1900	South High School / Barrett Middle School / the Charles S. Barrett Building	More images	345 E. Deshler Avenue	In use	Used as an apartment building. David Riebel design.
1901	Livingston Elementary School		825 E. Livingston Avenue; 744 Heyl Avenue	Demolished	Replaced with a new structure. David Riebel design.
1904	Clinton Township School / Clinton School annex		10 Clinton Heights Avenue	Demolished	Replaced with more playground space for 1922 school building nearby.
1904	Leonard Avenue School		1655 Old Leonard Avenue	In use	Restored c. 1998 after decades of vacancy. Now a branch of the Economic & Community Development Institute
1905	Bellows Avenue Elementary School / Bellows School	More images	725 Bellows Avenue	Vacant	Under renovation, at risk of demolition. David Riebel design.
1905	Fourth Avenue School / Michigan Avenue School		1200 Michigan Avenue	In use	In use as the Michigan Avenue Apartments. David Riebel design.
1905	Linden School		2626 Westerville Road	Demolished	Moved to site of 1921 Linden school in that year. Replaced by Linden S.T.E.M. Academy in 2004.
1906	Eleventh Avenue Elementary School	More images	880 E. 11th Avenue	Demolished	Built for Clinton Township. Wilbur T. Mills design. Ruined in a 1994 fire
1906	Shepard School		873 Walcutt Avenue	In use	Closed 1977; now used as offices. David Riebel design.
1907	Eastwood Avenue Elementary School		1355 Eastwood Avenue	Demolished	Closed in 1974. David Riebel design.
1908	West High School / Starling Middle School	More images	120 S. Central Avenue	Vacant	Under renovation into apartments. David Riebel design.
1909	Indianola Junior High School / Graham Elementary and Middle School	More images	140 E. 16th Avenue	In use	Part of the Graham Family of Schools. David Riebel design.
1909	Reeb Avenue Elementary School	More images	280 Reeb Avenue	In use	Now the Reeb Avenue Center, a multi-use building. David Riebel design.
1909	Champion Elementary School		1270 Hawthorne Avenue	Demolished	Formerly in the center of Poindexter Village, demolished c. 2008. David Riebel design.
1910	West Broad Elementary School / Hague Avenue Elementary School	More images	2744 W. Broad Street	In use	In use by Columbus City Schools. David Riebel design.
1910	Heyl Elementary School		760 Reinhard Avenue	Demolished	Replaced with affordable housing. David Riebel design.
1910	Lane Avenue School / Laneview School		2366 Kenny Road	Demolished	Used as OSU farm storage later in its history. David Riebel design.
1912	Dana Avenue School		300 Dana Avenue	In use	Part of Columbus Collegiate Academy. David Riebel design.
1915	Crestview School / Indianola Informal K8 School	More images	251 E. Weber Road	In use	In use by Columbus City Schools. David Riebel design.
1916	Roosevelt Junior High School / Studer Avenue School	More images	1046 Studer Avenue	Demolished	David Riebel design.
1921	Fulton Street Elementary School		450 E. Fulton Street	Demolished	Closed in 1974. David Riebel design.
1921	Burroughs Elementary School / John Burroughs School / Sullivant Avenue School		551 S. Richardson Avenue	In use	In use by Columbus City Schools. David Riebel design.
1921	Linden Elementary School	Non-free image	2626 Westerville Road	Demolished	Replaced by Linden S.T.E.M. Academy in 2004. David Riebel design.
1922	Clinton Elementary School		10 Clinton Heights Avenue	In use	In use by Columbus City Schools. Howard Dwight Smith design.
1922	East High School	More images	1500 E. Broad Street	In use	In use by Columbus City Schools. Howell & Thomas design.
1922	Olentangy Elementary School		335 W. Poplar Avenue	Demolished	Torn down in 1987 >
1922	Pilgrim Elementary School		440 Taylor Avenue	Vacant	Closed 2008 and sold PACT in 2015. David Riebel design.
1924	Central High School	More images	75 Washington Boulevard	In use	In use as part of COSI science museum; some portions demolished. William B. Ittner design.
1924	South High School		1160 Ann Street	In use	In use by Columbus City Schools. Richards, McCarty & Bulford design.
1924	North High School / Columbus International High School	More images	100 E. Arcadia Avenue	In use	In use by Columbus City Schools as Dominion Middle School. Frank Packard design.
1924	Fairwood Elementary School	More images	726 Fairwood Avenue	In use	In use by Columbus City Schools. Howard Dwight Smith design.
1924	Lincoln Park Elementary School		1666 S. 18th Street	Demolished	Additions made in 1952 and 1961. Replaced with newer school. Howard Dwight Smith design.
1927	Columbus Alternative High School / McGuffey School		2632 McGuffey Road	In use	In use by Columbus City Schools. Howard Dwight Smith design.
1927	Courtright School		1712 Courtright Road	In use	In use by religious organizations. Howard Dwight Smith design. Originally part of Truro Township, later Whitehall, and then Columbus. The school closed in 1979.
1927	Open Air School / Neil Avenue School	More images	2571 Neil Avenue	In use	Replaced a 1913 Open Air School. Now a mixed-use development. Howard Dwight Smith design.
1928	Linden-McKinley High School / William McKinley Junior High School	More images	1320 Duxberry Avenue	In use	In use by Columbus City Schools. Expanded in 1942 for high school. Howard Dwight Smith design.
1929	Indianola Junior High School	More images	420 E. 19th Avenue	Vacant	Owned by Metro Schools. Howard Dwight Smith design.
1929	West High School		179 S. Powell Avenue	In use	In use by Columbus City Schools. Howard Dwight Smith design.
1950	Indian Springs School	More images	50 E. Henderson Road	In use	In use by Columbus City Schools
1950	Fairmoor Elementary School	Non-free image	3281 Mayfair Park Place	Demolished	Replaced with newer school
1952	Franklinton Elementary School		617 W. State Street	In use	In use by the United Preparatory Academy
1952	Glenmont Elementary School		470 Glenmont Avenue	In use	In use by the Ohio Center for Autism and Low Incidence
1952	Mohawk Middle School	More images	300 E. Livingston Avenue	Demolished	
1952	South Mifflin Elementary School		2365 Middlehurst Drive	Demolished	Closed in 2006, demolished and replaced by South Mifflin STEM Academy in 2008.
1952	Weinland Park Elementary School		211 E. 7th Avenue	Demolished	Replaced with newer school
1952	Westgate Elementary School	More images	3080 Wicklow Road	In use	In use by Columbus City Schools
1961	Whetstone High School	More images	4405 Scenic Drive	In use	In use by Columbus City Schools
1977	Columbus City Preparatory School for Girls / Franklin Junior High School / Franklin Alternative Middle School	More images	1390 Bryden Road	In use	In use by Columbus City Schools. On site of 1899 East High School.
