= Felton School =

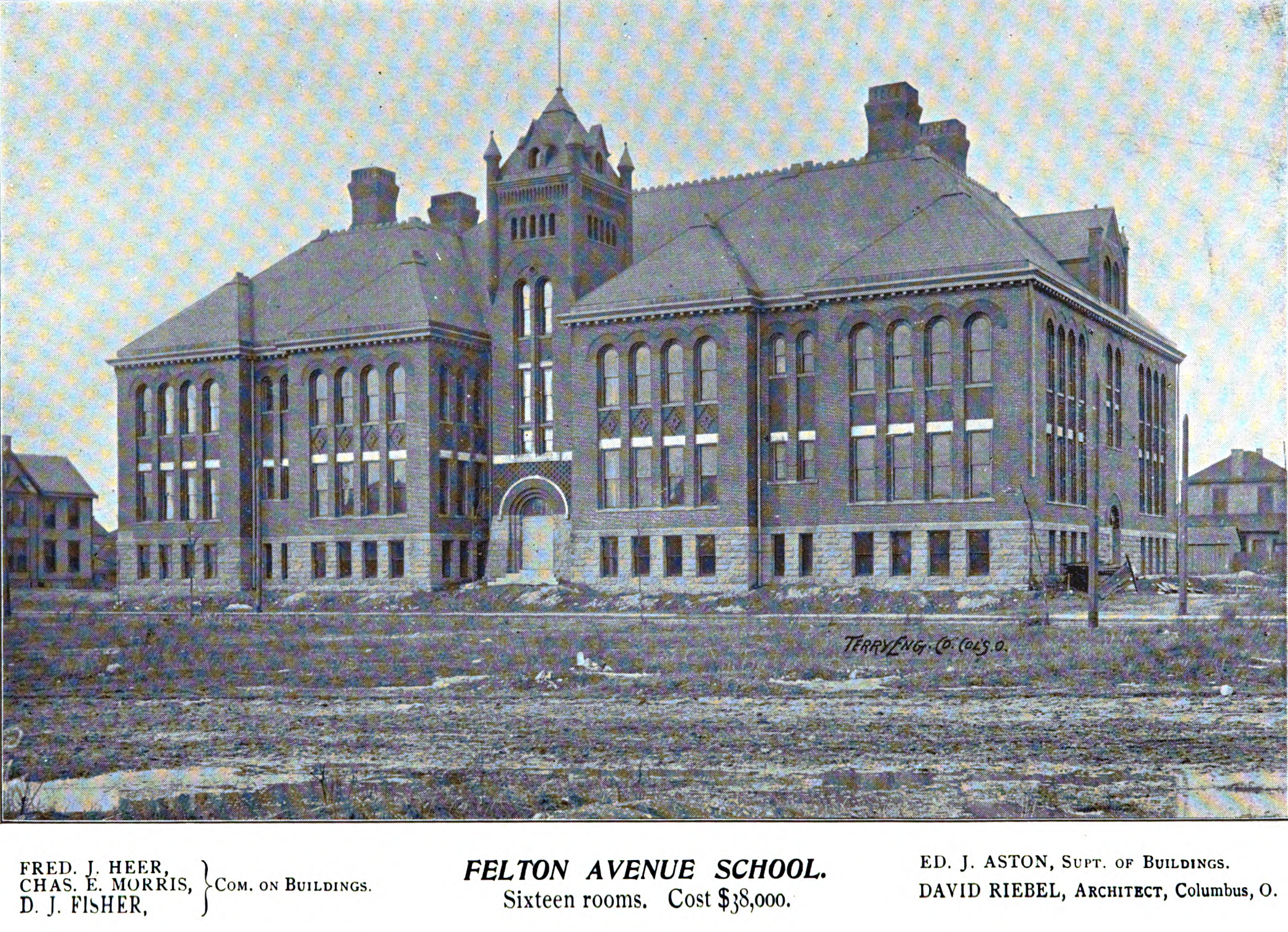
- 1894-published image of the school

Location
- 920 Leonard Ave. Columbus, Ohio; United States

Information
- Other name: Felton Avenue Elementary School
- Type: Public elementary school
- Opened: 1893
- Closed: 1975
- School district: Columbus
- Felton School
- U.S. National Register of Historic Places
- Columbus Register of Historic Properties
- Interactive map highlighting the building's location
- Coordinates: 39.975556°N 82.978333°W
- Built: 1893
- Architect: David Riebel
- Architectural style: Romanesque Revival
- Demolished: 1990
- NRHP reference No.: 84003677
- CRHP No.: CR-34

Significant dates
- Added to NRHP: May 31, 1984
- Designated CRHP: January 21, 1985

The Felton School was a public school building in the Mount Vernon neighborhood of Columbus, Ohio, and a part of the Columbus Public School District. It was listed on the National Register of Historic Places in 1984 and the Columbus Register of Historic Properties in 1985.

The brick school building was completed in 1893, designed in the Romanesque Revival style by local architect David Riebel. It was one of his first school building projects, and is nearly identical to another in Columbus, Southwood Elementary School, also on the Columbus Register. The Felton School building had two single-story wings, added to its east and west sides in the mid 1950s. By the 1980s, urban renewal projects surrounded the building, and the school had moved to a new building across the street. The Felton School building became vacant around 1975. Two attempts to sell it were unsuccessful, though it was purchased in the 1980s, with plans to use it as a corporate office building. The building was demolished in 1990.

The Felton School is nearly identical to Southwood Elementary School, also designed by Riebel, built one year later, and still extant.

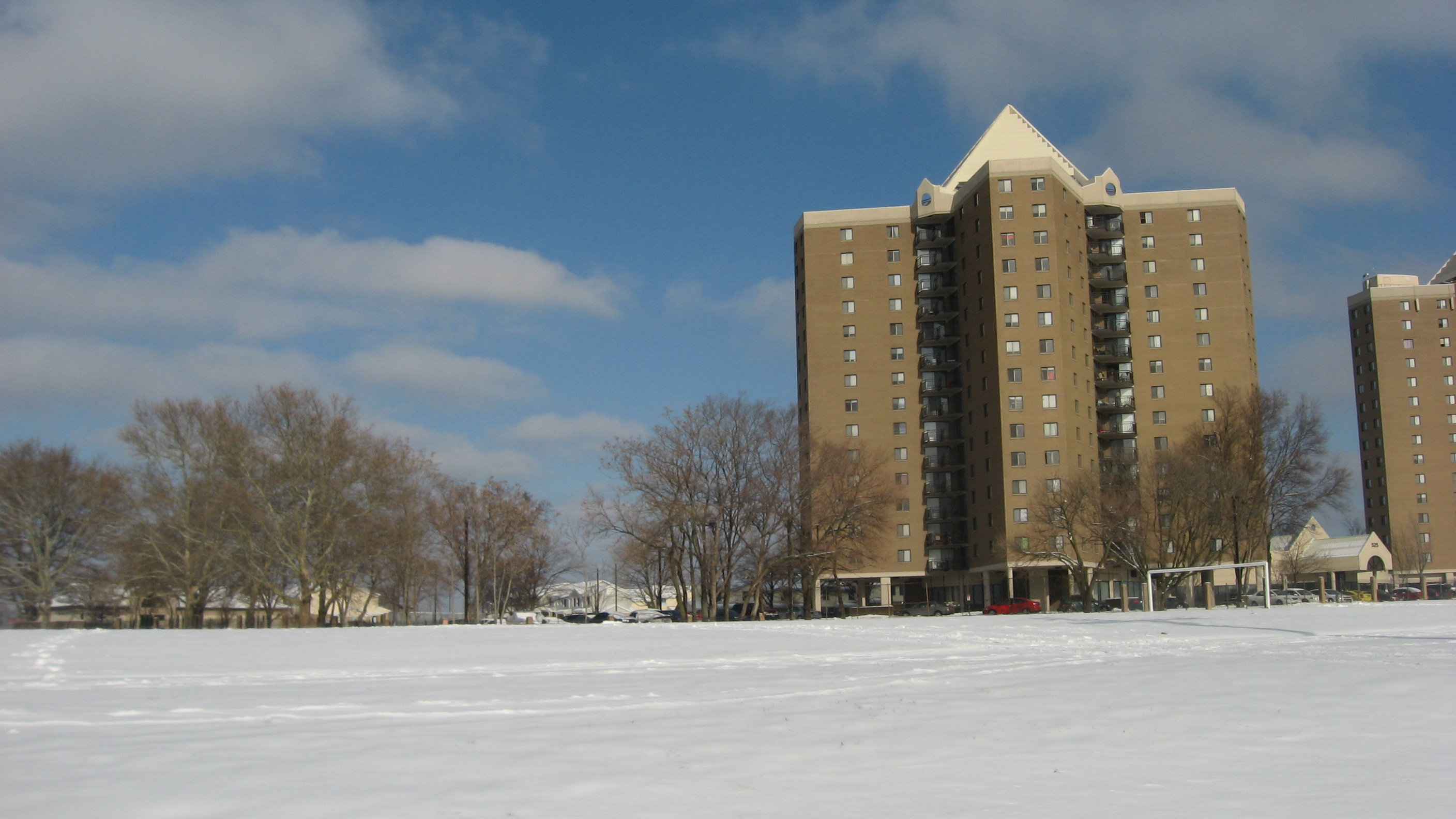
Present-day site of the school building

== See also ==
- National Register of Historic Places listings in Columbus, Ohio
- Schools in Columbus, Ohio
