= Seneca Hotel =

- Columbus Register of Historic Properties
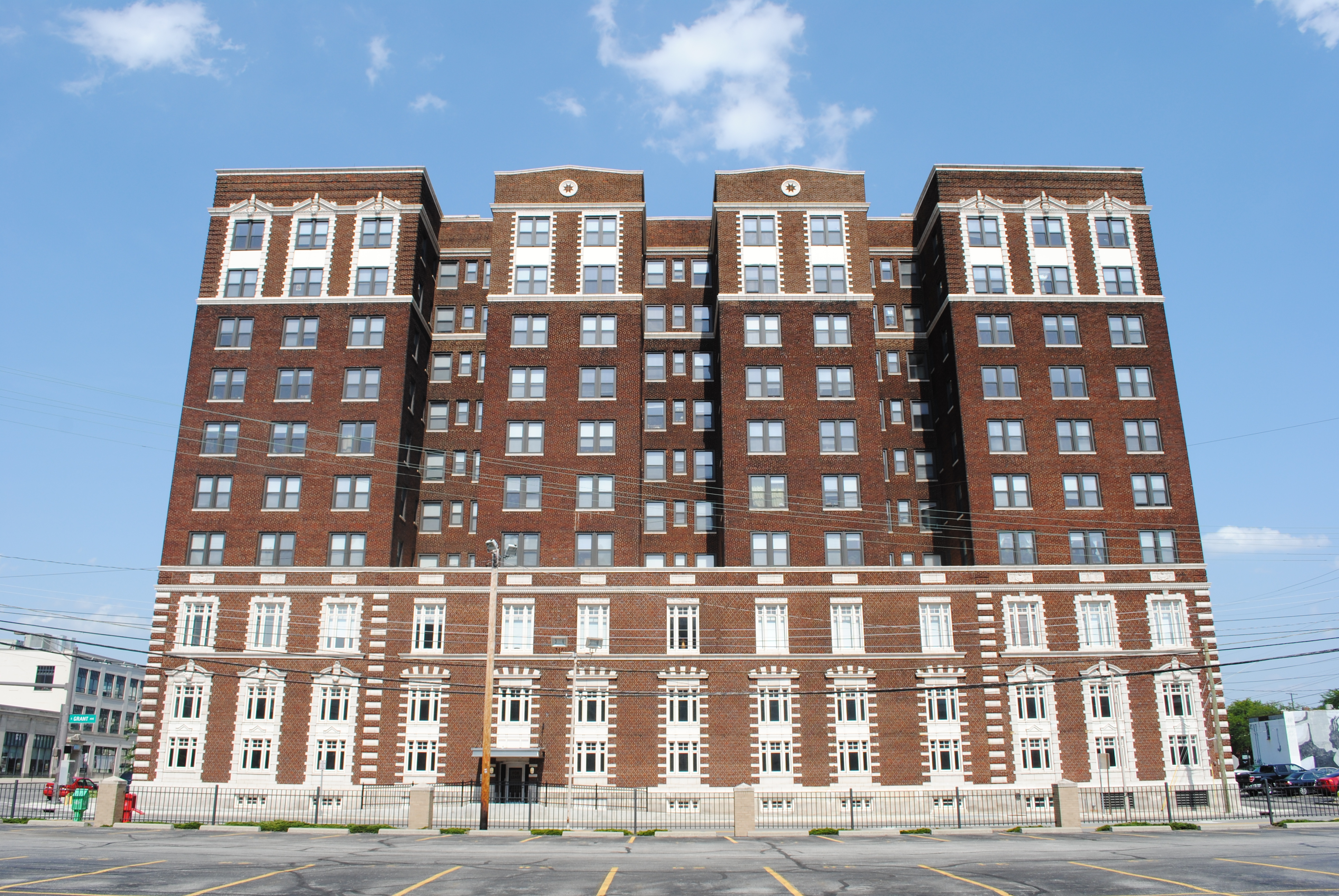
- Interactive map highlighting the building's location
- Location: 367 E. Broad St., Columbus, Ohio
- Coordinates: 39°57′46″N 82°59′26″W
- Area: 0.258 acres (0.104 ha)
- Built: 1917
- Architect: Frank Packard, David Riebel & Sons
- NRHP reference No.: #83004300
- CRHP No.: CR-51

Significant dates
- Added to NRHP: December 29, 1983
- Designated CRHP: October 1, 1991

The Seneca, formerly known as the Seneca Hotel, is a 10-story apartment complex and former hotel in the Discovery District of downtown Columbus, Ohio. The brick building was designed by architects Frank Packard and David Riebel & Sons and built in 1917, in a prominent location near Franklin County Memorial Hall, where conventions were held. A four-story wing was built on the hotel's east side in 1924. The hotel closed in the mid-20th century, and it held the Nationwide Beauty Academy from 1960 to 1974. Dormitories held female students for Nationwide and about six other public and private schools downtown. The Seneca became home to the Ohio Environmental Protection Agency from 1976 to 1987. The building was added to the National Register of Historic Places in 1983 and the Columbus Register of Historic Properties in 1991. In 1988, the building became vacant, and remained that way until 2005.

The former hotel was renovated from around 2005 to 2008 at a cost of $21 million, including funds directed by the Ohio State Department of Development and the City of Columbus. The building now includes 76 units, including studio, one-, and two-bedroom apartments. Rental units at its opening ranged from $999 to $1,400 per month.

== See also ==
- National Register of Historic Places listings in Columbus, Ohio
