= Reeb Avenue Center =

Community center in Columbus, Ohio

- Reeb Avenue Elementary School
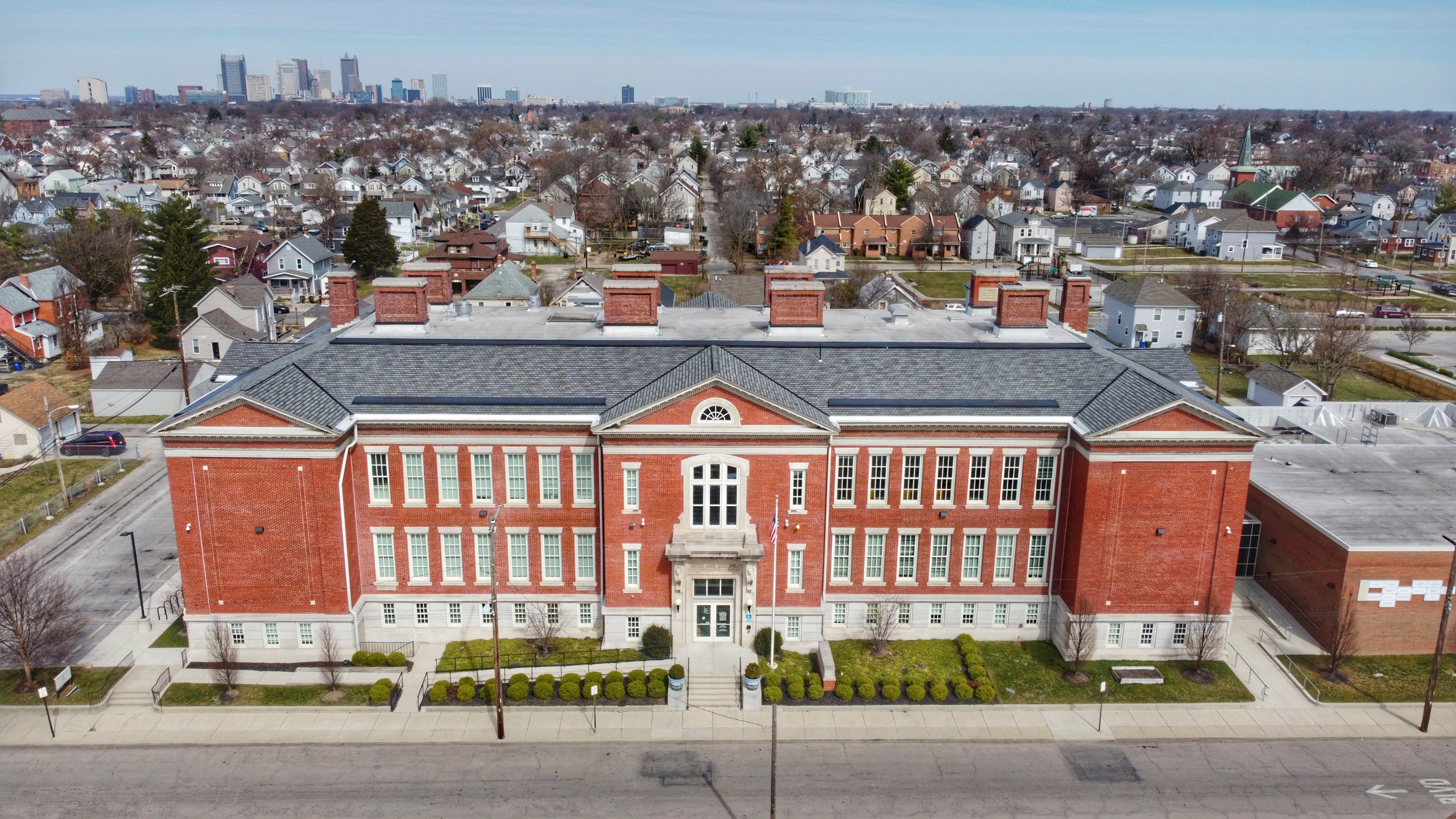
- 39.925181°N 82.987698°W
- Location: 280 Reeb Avenue, Columbus, Ohio

History
- Built: 1905-07

Site notes
- Architect: David Riebel
- Architectural style: Neoclassical
- Owner: City of Columbus
- Website: www.reebavenuecenter.org

Columbus Register of Historic Properties
- Designated: July 22, 2013
- Reference no.: CR-61

The Reeb Avenue Center is a community center and 501(c)(3) in the Reeb-Hosack neighborhood of Columbus, Ohio. The Reeb Center opened in 2015, after a $12.5 million renovation. The Center and its multiple nonprofit subtenants provide services including workforce development and job training, early learning preschool and child care, after-school and summer programming for school-aged children, a variety of social services, and a cafe which serves weekday lunches and Tuesday evening dinner. During the COVID-19 pandemic, the Center partially closed for three months, then began reopening in May 2020 to promptly return to serving local area residents.

The building was built as Columbus Public Schools' Reeb Avenue Elementary School, and was listed on the Columbus Register of Historic Properties in 2013. It was designed in the Neoclassical style by David Riebel, and was built from 1905 to 1907. The building is now owned by the City of Columbus.

== See also ==
- Schools in Columbus, Ohio
- Social services in Columbus, Ohio
