= Bellows School =

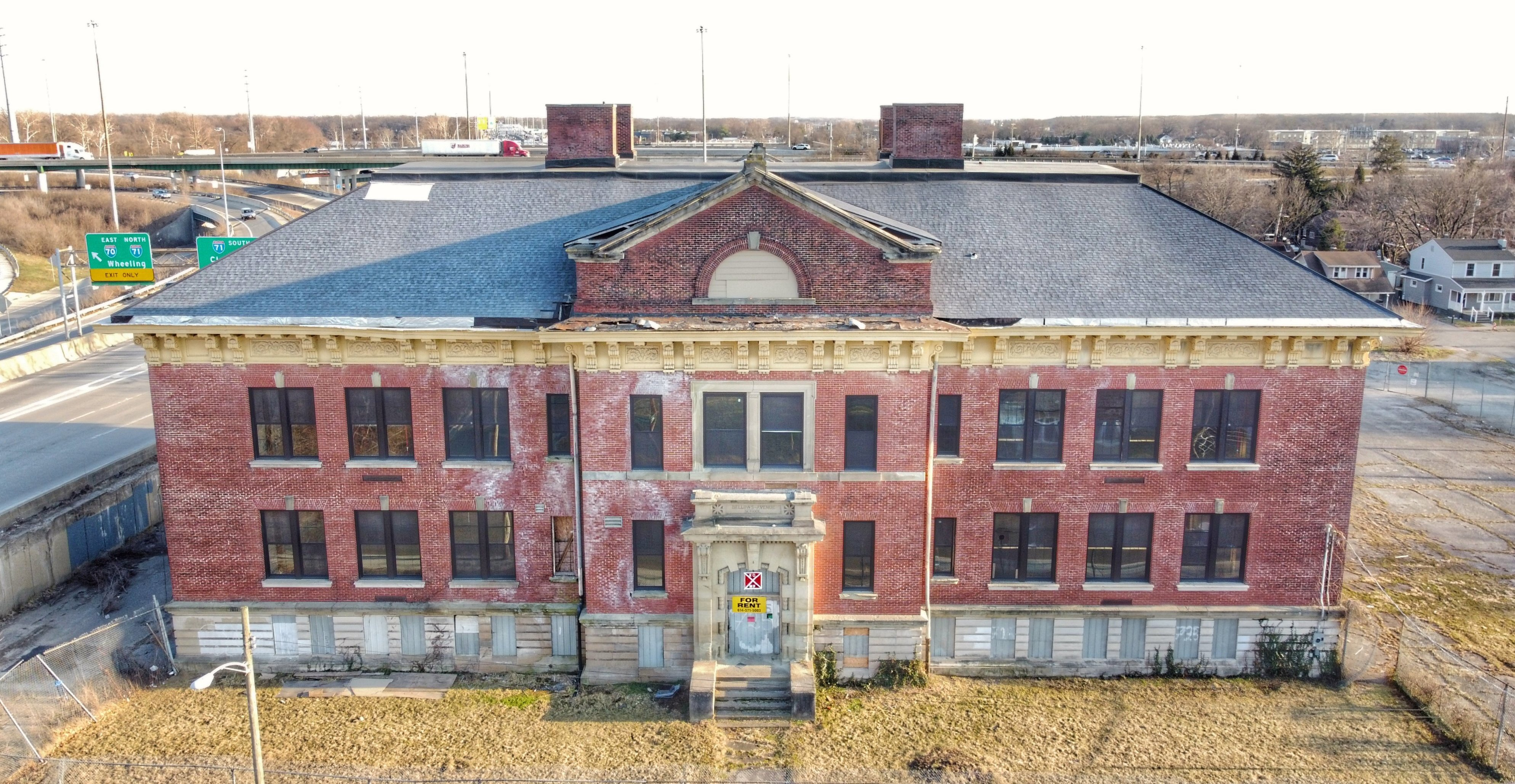
- The school building in 2022

Location
- 725 Bellows Avenue; Columbus, Ohio; United States
- Coordinates: 39.952732°N 83.018306°W

Information
- Other name: Bellows Avenue Elementary School
- Type: Public elementary school
- Opened: 1905
- Closed: 1977
- School district: Columbus
- Campus size: 1.8 acres (0.73 ha)
- Architect: David Riebel
- Architectural style: Renaissance Revival

The Bellows School, also known as the Bellows Avenue Elementary School, is a historic school building in the Franklinton neighborhood of Columbus, Ohio. The building was constructed for the Columbus Public School District in 1905, designed by local architect David Riebel and built by George Bellows Sr. The elementary school operated until 1977; since then the building has been mostly vacant. The building was deemed eligible for the National Register of Historic Places by the Ohio Historic Preservation Office in 2006. In 2014, a developer announced plans to renovate the structure, despite plans from Ohio's transportation agency to demolish it to expand nearby highway exit ramps.

== Attributes ==
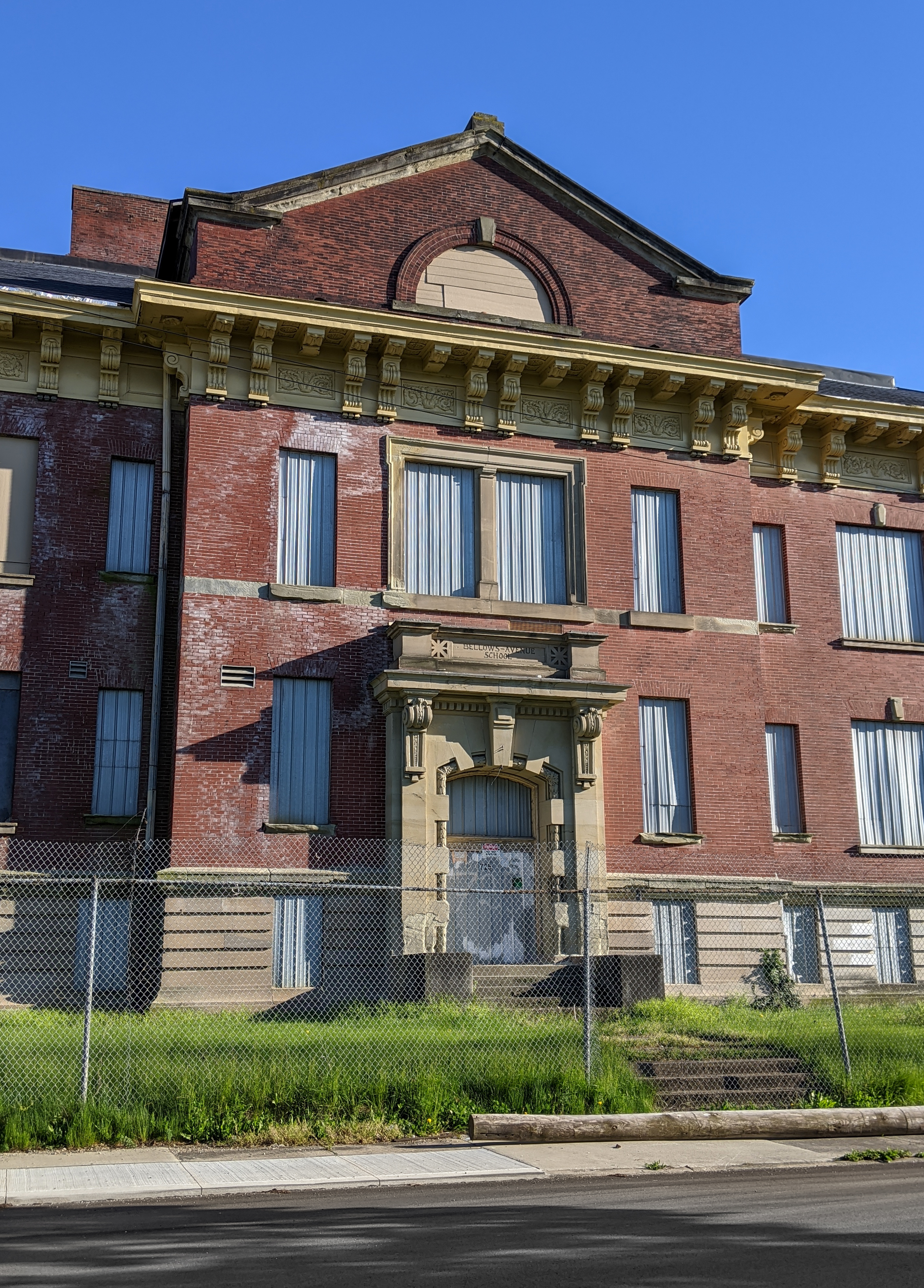
Central pedimented pavilion, 2021

The site has 1.8 acres (0.73 ha). It has a highly visible location, adjacent to Ohio State Route 315 and just north of Interstate 70.

The building is designed in the Renaissance Revival style. It features a rusticated limestone foundation, an elaborate bracketed cornice, a main entranceway of intricate carved sandstone with Neoclassical foliate details, and more simple side entrances with stone pilasters. For its architecture, user as a major school facility for decades, and prominence as a notable work of David Riebel, the school is eligible for the National Register of Historic Places.

The building has an intact exterior, with original brick walls, limestone trim, and a slate roof. The building still retains original wood window sashes and some doors. While vacant, the building has had corrugated metal coverings to discourage trespassing. The building has never had any additions made to it.

== History ==
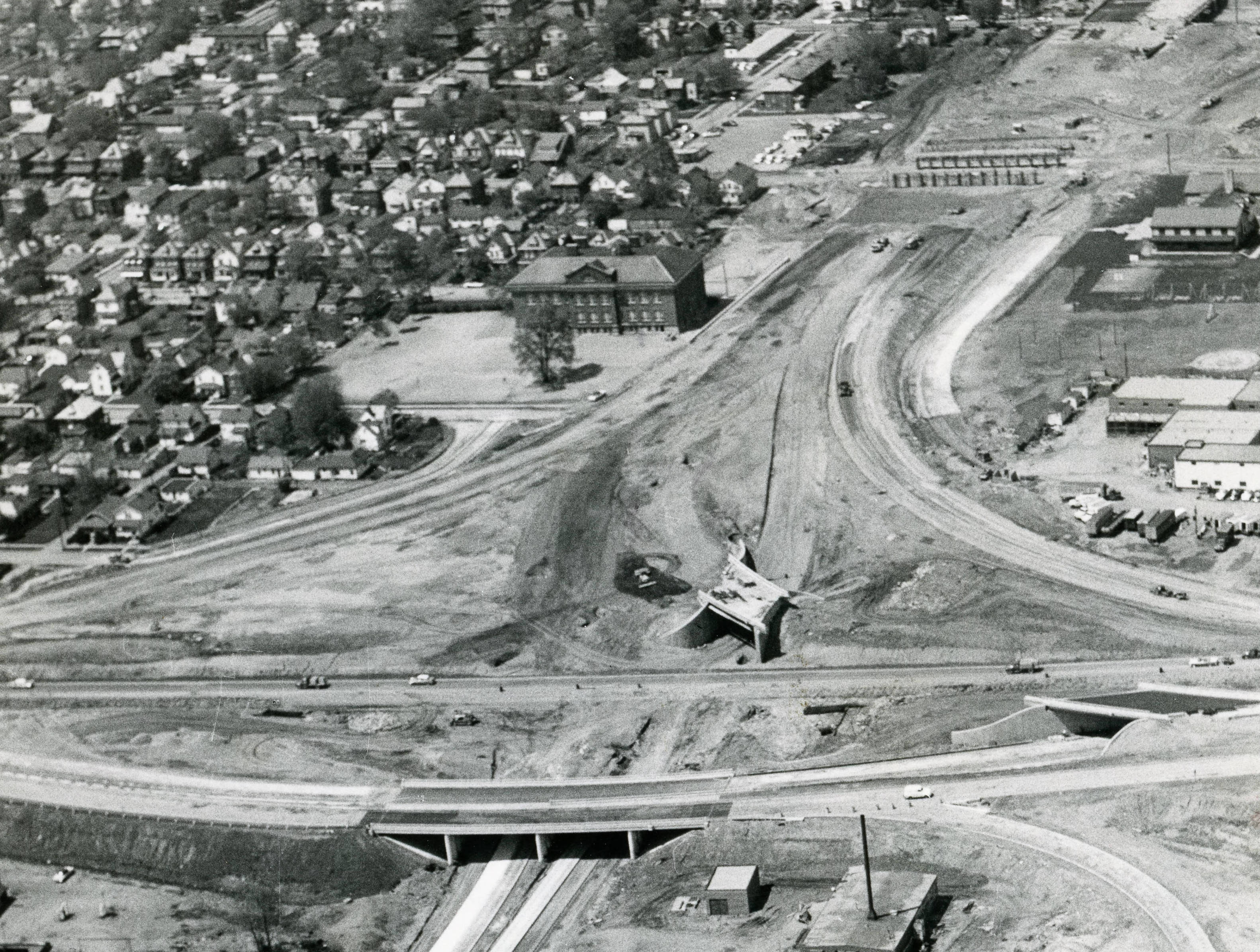
Aerial view in the 1950s, during highway construction

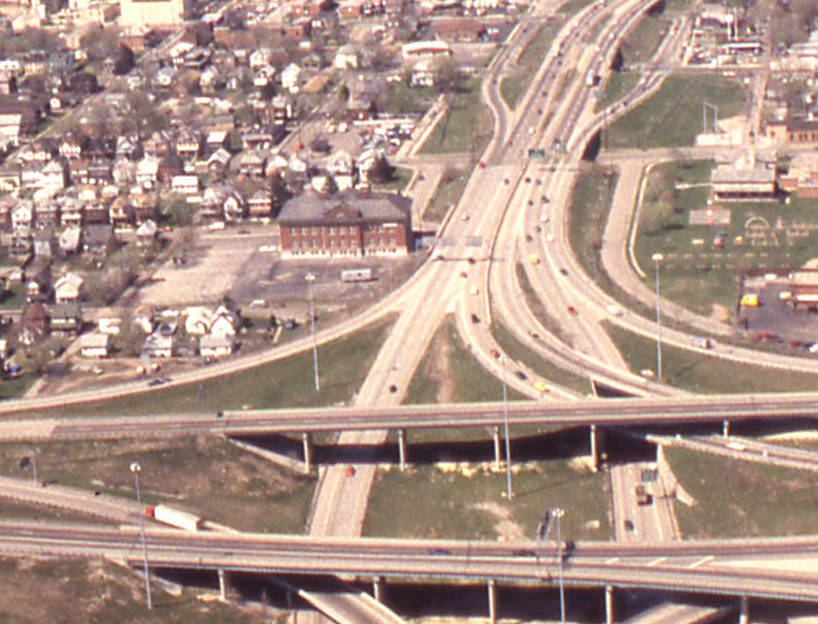
In 1988, largely as it stands today

Built in 1905, the building was built and named for local architect and builder George Bellows Sr., father of the artist George Bellows. The school was designed by German-American architect David Riebel, head architect for the school system from 1893 to 1922.

The school closed in 1977 and has mostly been vacant since then. The building was deemed eligible for the National Register of Historic Places by the Ohio Historic Preservation Office in 2006.

Amid the Ohio Department of Transportation (ODOT)'s I-70/71 split project, the building was set to be torn down, as part of the long-range plan for the highways. The proposal would create new exit ramps around the interchange, increasing traffic safety and efficiency. No build alternative was found that would lead to the building's preservation, as studied in a 2008 ODOT report. One alternative design was not recommended, as it would take land from the nearby Dodge Park, a public park that provides services to residents in neighboring areas. It would result in the loss of a baseball field or a soccer/football field, and part of a walking trail. The school building, even if renovated into housing, was deemed to not provide fundamental services to the neighborhood that the park offers.

In 2014, even despite the planned demolition, developer Yhezkel Levi purchased it. The building is planned to be renovated, to include office space in its basement and 27 apartments on the main and two upper floors. A complex of eight townhouse units and three single family homes is proposed for the site around the building. The developer is going forward as the highway project may take several decades before it reaches that area, and there is no money budgeted for that section yet. The developer hopes that the renovation and any historic designations would make the state's purchase of the site more costly and difficult. The building was listed on the Columbus Landmarks Foundation's endangered buildings list in 2014 and 2015. By 2017, Levi had replaced almost all of the roof, shored up rotted floors, remediated for asbestos, and removed piles of trash and debris. As of 2021, the building is still under renovation, with new windows added to upper floors that year.

== See also ==
- Schools in Columbus, Ohio
