= Old North Columbus =

Neighborhood in Columbus, Ohio

- Neighborhood of Columbus, Ohio
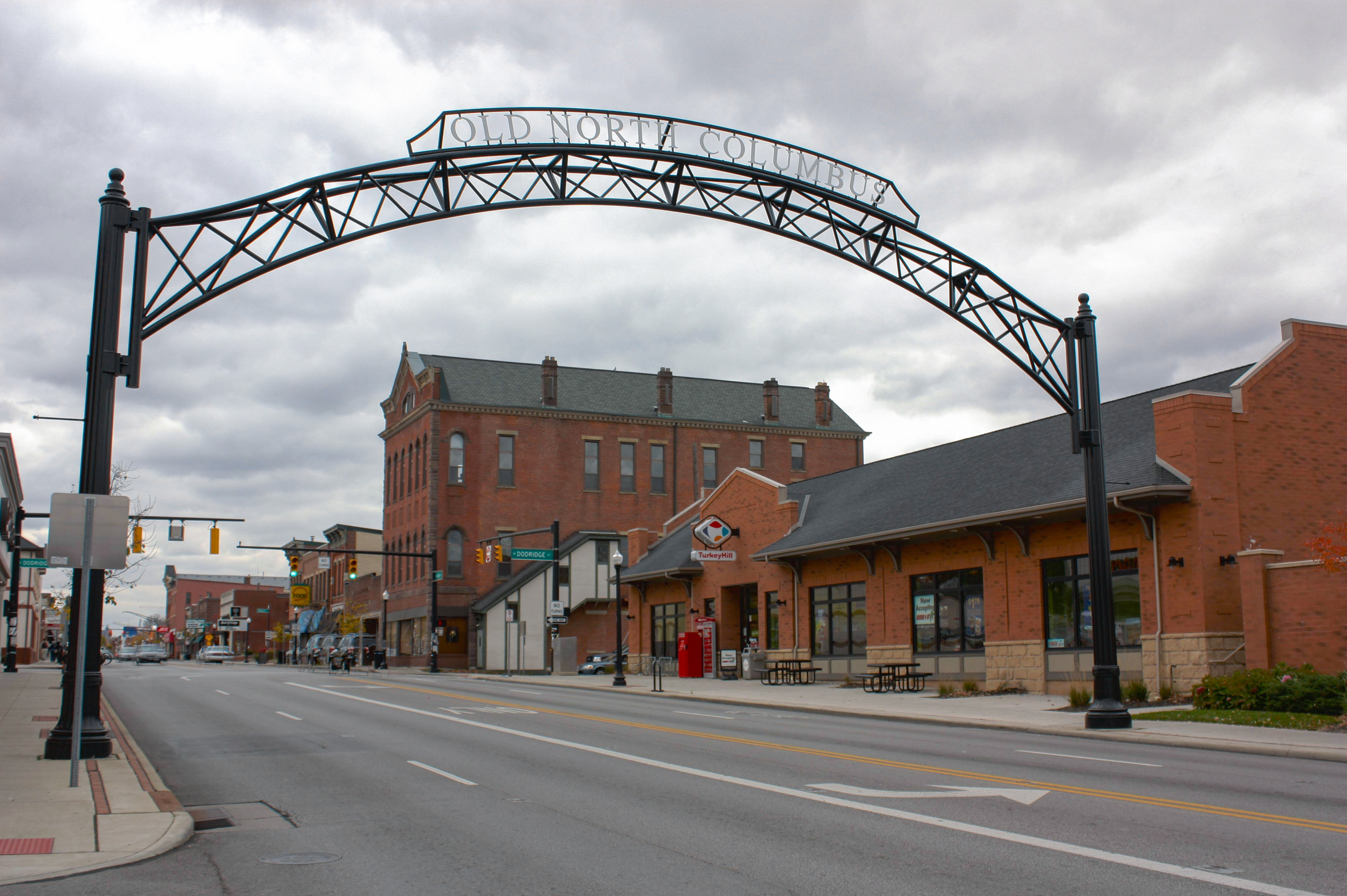
- Old North Columbus Arch
- Interactive map of the neighborhood
- Coordinates: 40°00′52″N 83°00′41″W
- Country: United States
- State: Ohio
- County: Franklin
- City: Columbus
- Website: oldnorthcolumbus.com

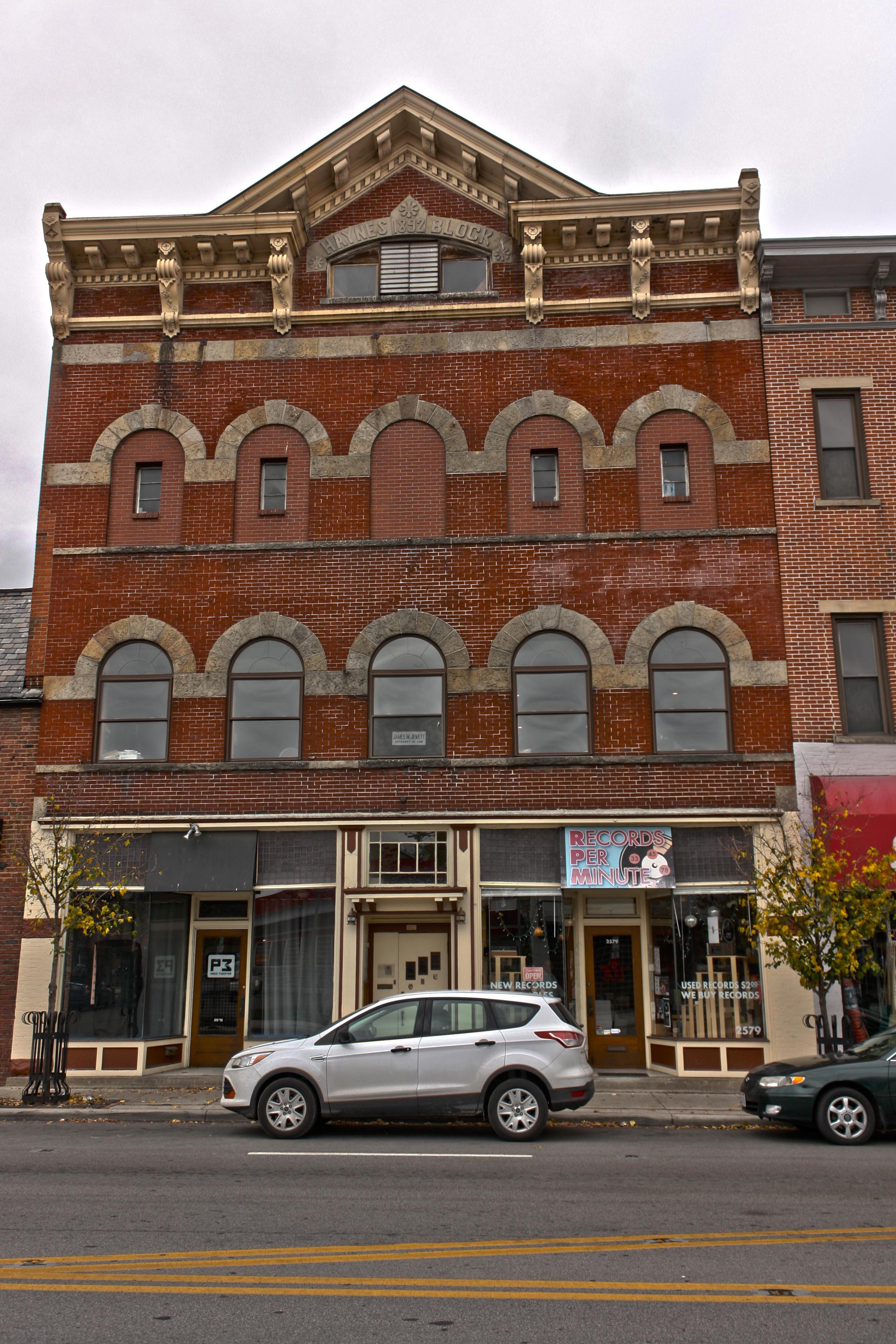
Haynes Block Building

Old North Columbus is a neighborhood located just north of the Ohio State University in Columbus, Ohio. It was founded in 1847 as a stand-alone city outside the City of Columbus, then incorporated into Columbus in 1871. In its early years the city was a popular stagecoach stop for people traveling from Worthington to Columbus. Today, Old North Columbus is popular for its local music and its unique "untouched architecture", which is reminiscent of its old roots.

== Geography ==
Old North Columbus is bounded to the north by Glen Echo Ravine, to the south by Lane Avenue, to the west by the Olentangy River, and to the east by the Conway Railroad Tracks. This Columbus neighborhood is a smaller subdivision of the University District, which comprises all of the neighborhoods surrounding the Ohio State University campus.

== Etymology ==
Established as North Columbus in 1842, the name of the town largely lost relevance when it was annexed by the city of Columbus in 1871. In an effort to reestablish the neighborhood's identity, a street project was proposed in 2000 to add two arches at the north and south borders of the neighborhood bearing the neighborhood's name, Old North Columbus. In 2009, upon the building of the arches, there was a campaign led by the Olde North Columbus Preservation Society to add the letter “e” to the end of “Old”, on the two arches. According to Preservation Society member Seth Golding, "Olde was the spelling in the 1850s. It's more quaint, not just old. " Despite Preservation Society claims that the spelling was supposed to be corrected, the two arches retain the original spelling of “Old”.

== History ==
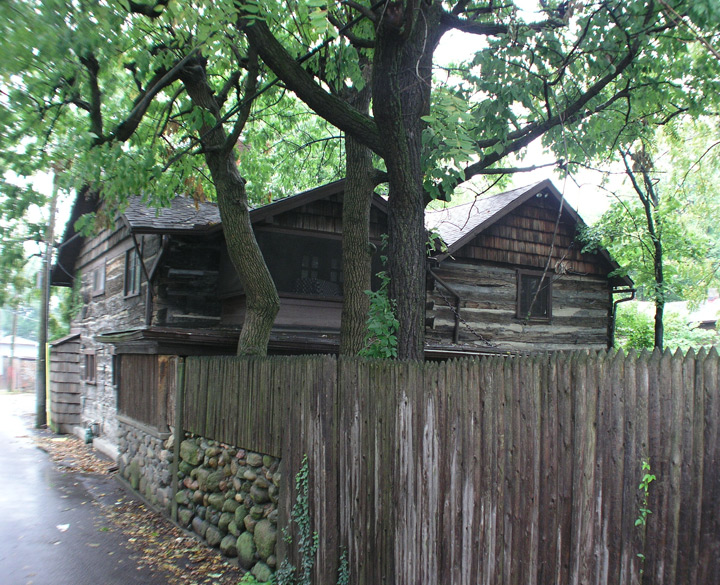
1806 Beers Family Log Cabin located on E Norwich Ave., Columbus, Ohio.

Solomen and George W. Beers platted 40 acres of land in 1847 to create the first permanent settlement of Clinton Township, which they named North Columbus. This community was separate from the city of Columbus, located just to the south, but was later annexed by Columbus in 1871. During the 19th Century, North Columbus was a stagecoach stop between downtown Columbus and Worthington. Unlike the adjacent temperance-minded neighborhood of Clintonville, North Columbus had a history of saloons and speakeasies adorning the main thoroughfare of what is today High Street. North Columbus was also the site of a brick factory and a mill along the banks of the Olentangy River, which was owned and operated by the Beers Family, who helped to settle the area originally. Soon after being annexed in 1871, the city had a new neighbor in the community in 1873, The Ohio State University. Ohio State brought a major boom to the area and with that boom came more people that needed to live, work, and play. This really was the birth of what Old North Columbus is today.

=== Notable and historic landmarks ===
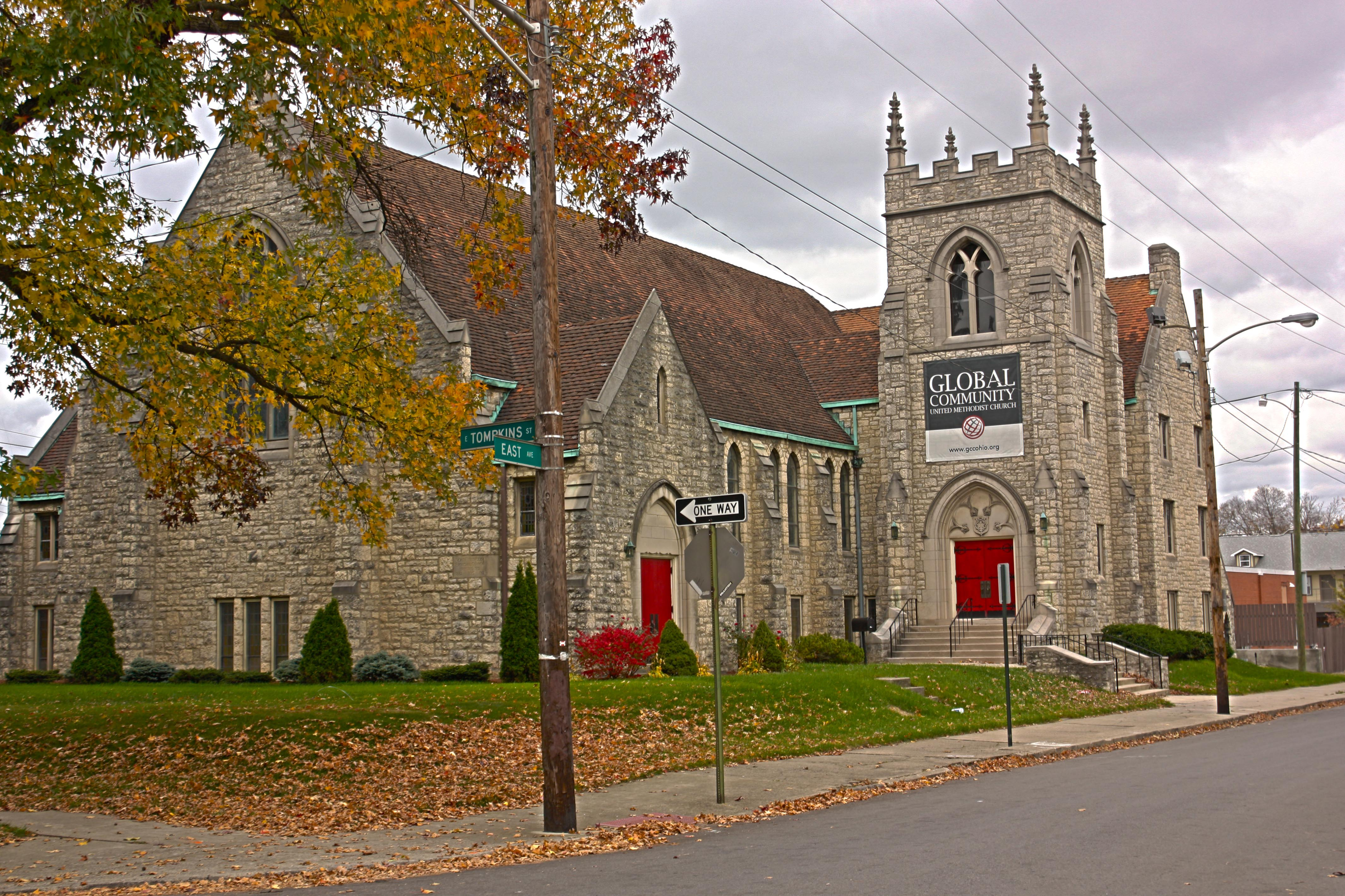
Global Community United Methodist Church

Old North Columbus has a number of Historic structures dating back to the early 19th Century. The North Columbus Commercial Historic District, which encompasses the entire stretch of High Street between Hudson Street and Dodridge Street is on the National Register of Historic Places.

==== 1806 Beers Family Log Cabin ====
There is also an original early 19th century log cabin, built in 1806 by David Beers, still present in the neighborhood. The log cabin was built near present-day Dodridge Street, but was later moved to Norwich Avenue.

==== North High School ====
Also appearing on the National Register of Historic Places is the old North High School, a Tudor Revival building designed by famed architect, Frank Packard, which opened on September 2, 1924.

==== The Ramlow Building ====
The Ramlow building, or Ramlow Hall, on the corner of High Street and Dodridge is one of a handful of prominent historic building along High Street, which date back to the late 19th century, and are still present. Built by Catherine Volk Ramlow in 1881, the Ramlow building was a drygoods and grocer merchant.

==== Global Community United Methodist Church ====
The Global Community United Methodist Church, formerly the North Methodist Church, was built on the corner of High Street and Wilcox Street in 1874, but was destroyed by a fire in 1929. Despite economic hardships of the Great Depression, the church was rebuilt 12 years later and dedicated on September 27, 1942 by Bishop H. Lester Smith.

==== Medary Elementary School ====
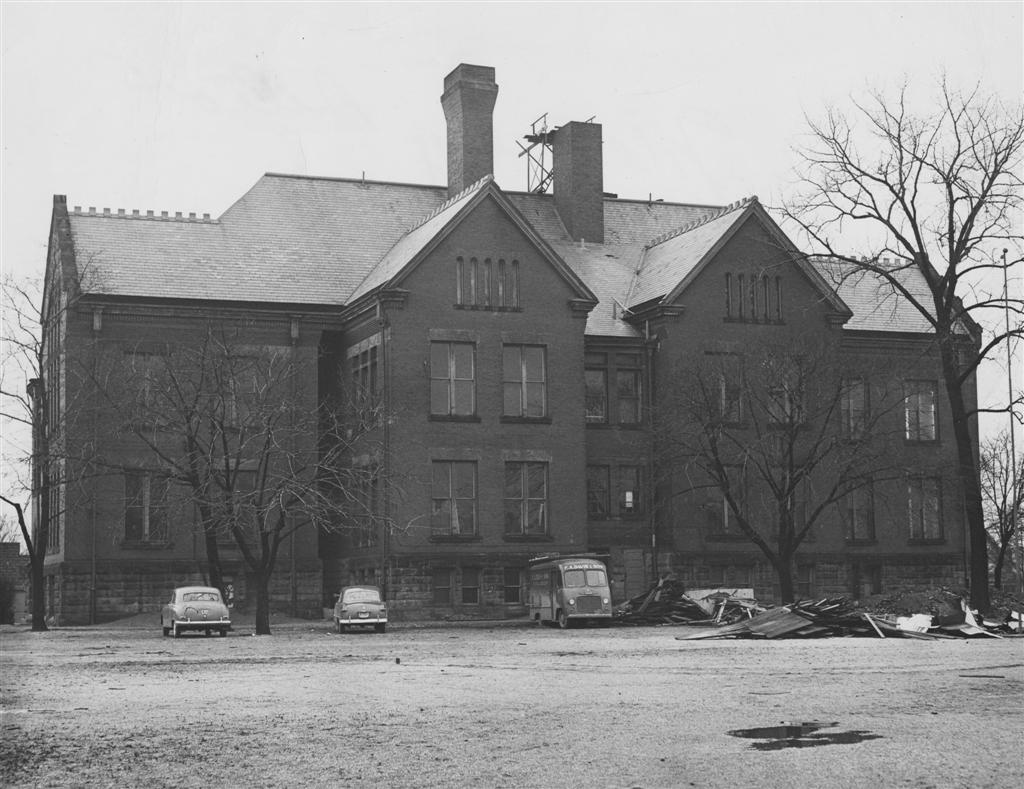
Medary Elementary School

Medary Avenue Elementary School, located at 2500 Medary Avenue, was built in 1892 by David Riebel, who was hired as the first Columbus Public Schools architect in 1893. The impressive three-story masonry building was built in the Richardsonian Romanesque style of architecture, which was a popular style for many public buildings throughout the late 19th century and early 20th century. Medary Elementary School closed in 2007 and the building has served as the home for the Bridgeway Academy, formerly Helping Hands Center for Special Needs, since 2008.

== Transportation ==
The main thoroughfare running North and South through the neighborhood is High St. and running east and west is Hudson St. This is where many restaurants, bars, shops, and entertainment destinations are located, and where most of the activity is centered. From these main thoroughfares, arterial streets the run East and West. These arterials include Lane Ave. and Dodridge St., which are the only two streets in the neighborhood which bridge the Olentangy River to the West. Nearly all other streets running east–west can be classified as residential streets, most of which are one-way, in alternating directions. US Route 23 also runs through Old North Columbus using Indianola Ave., Hudson St., Summit St. (southbound), and N. 4th St. (northbound). Old North Columbus is also very accessible by bus. The Central Ohio Transit Authority (COTA) has local bus routes traveling along High, Summit, and 4th Streets, one express route traveling along High St., and two cross-town routes traveling along Arcadia Ave. and Hudson St. There are also bike friendly routes through Old North Columbus including a protected bicycle lane running south on Summit St. from Hudson St. to E. 11th Ave., and an unprotected bike lane running north on N. 4th St. from E. 11th Ave. to Hudson St.

== Residential ==
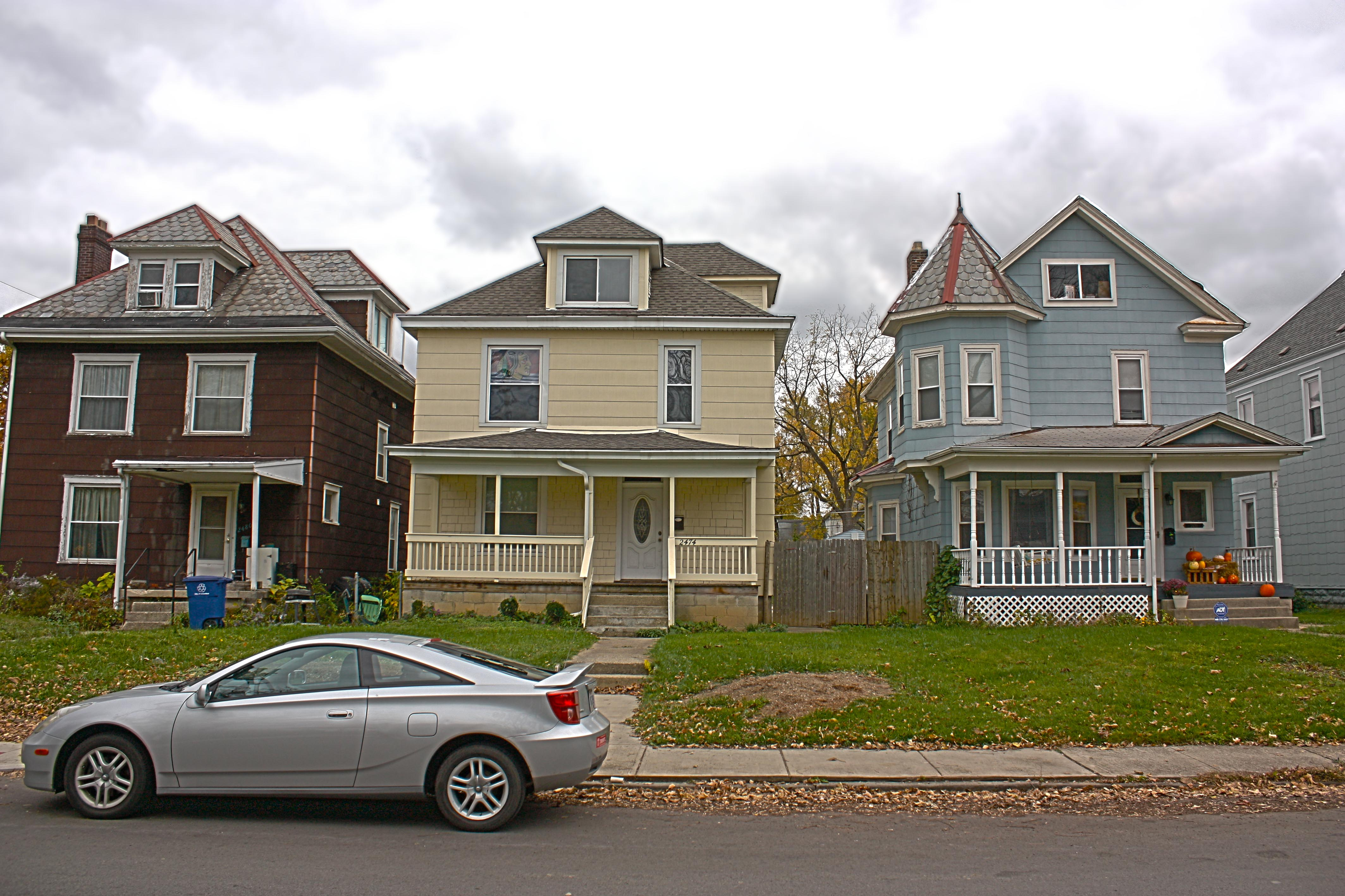
Residential street in the neighborhood

The residential sector of Old North Columbus has always been a melting pot of significant diversity including the full spectrum of working class to the wealthy as well as its share of students. After World War II there was a tremendous number of veterans looking to go to school at Ohio State with the GI Bill and at the same time the Baby Boomers were headed to college as well. This, paired with the national trend of "white flight" moving to the suburbs, led to a housing crisis in the Columbus suburbs. This major influx of GIs and students caused the housing market to flip. Home ownership dropped from over 50% to around 10% as many of the large old houses were converted to multi-family high density housing that would accommodate the renter population. Historically off campus housing has poor housing stock, this is the case for neighborhoods close to Ohio State; however, the housing is generally of better quality farther north.

== Commercial district ==
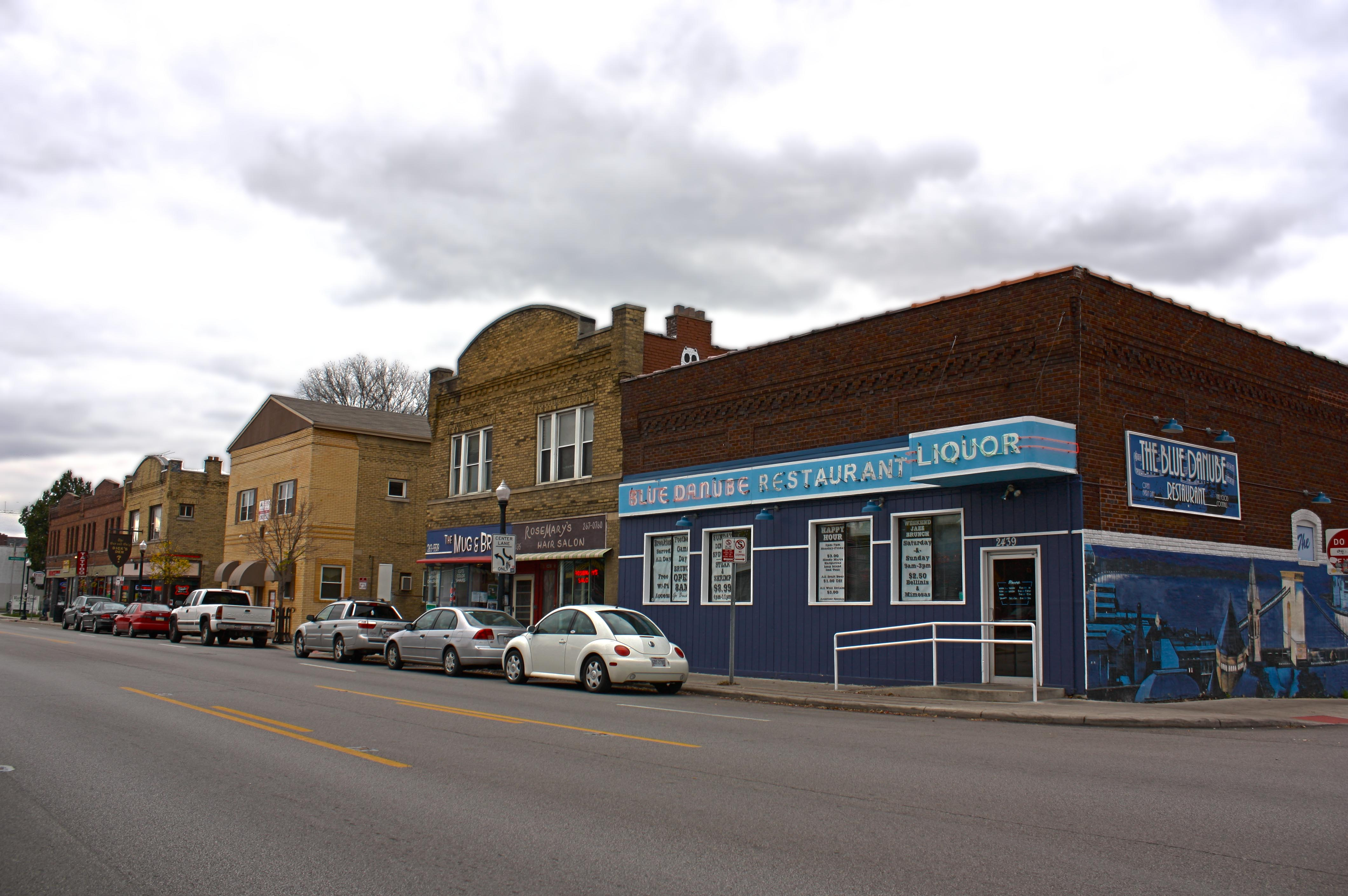
The Blue Danube

Old North Columbus has had a long history of restaurants, bars, and music venues, which still holds true today. With the core of commercial district located along High Street, the businesses in the neighborhood range from grocery stores, pharmacies, printing and copy services, laundromats, barber shops and salons, but primarily this has been a popular entertainment district for students at Ohio State. One of the notable popular restaurants was The Blue Danube, a popular restaurant of the neighborhood from 1940 to when it closed in 2018. The business's new owner plans to reopen the Blue Danube in the summer or fall of 2023.

== Education ==
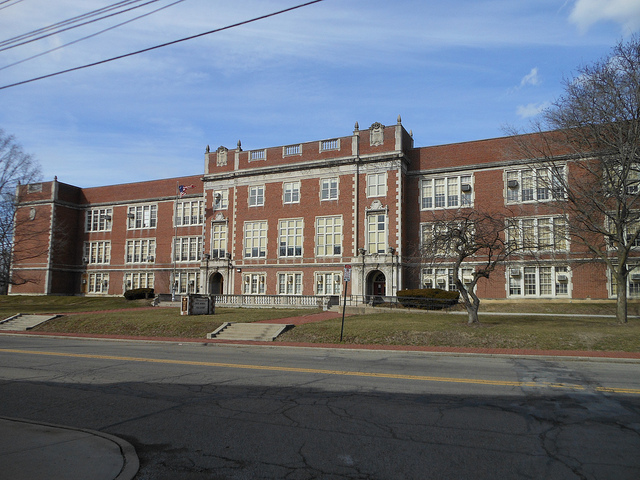
North High School

There is one school located in Old North Columbus, which is the Columbus North International School, located at the site of the old North High School at 100 E Arcadia Avenue. This 7th through 12th grade school, which was founded in 2010, is largely focused around international studies programs, such as their World Language Studies Program and their International Seminar Program. This school is a part of a network of other International Schools in Columbus such as Ecole Kenwood Elementary School, and Columbus North International School. It is also part of Columbus Public Schools lottery system that draws from middle schools in the surrounding Columbus City School District.
