= Graham Elementary and Middle School =

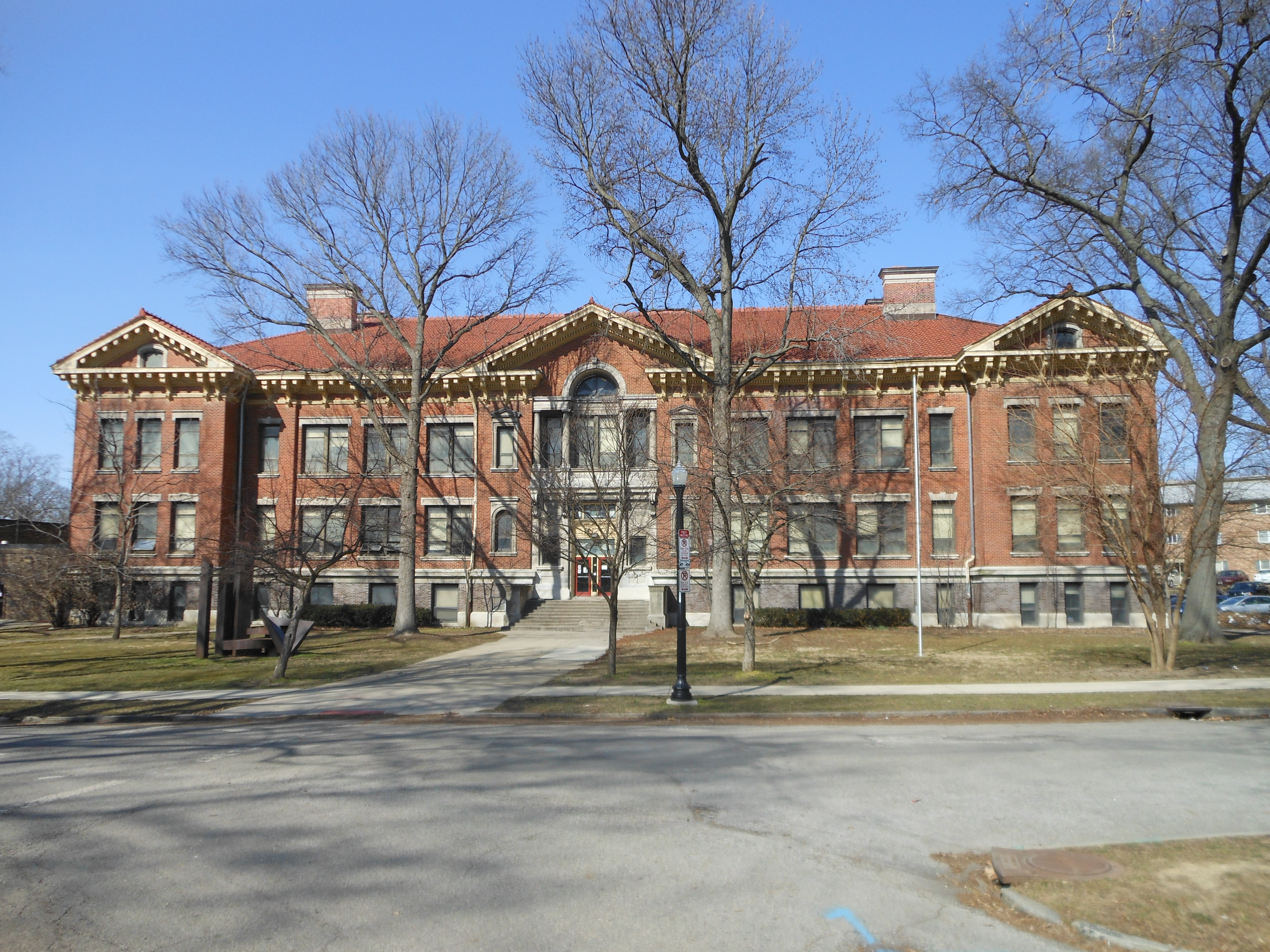
- Location: 140 East 16th Avenue, Columbus, Ohio
- Coordinates: 40.001606°N 83.004439°W
- Architect: David Riebel

Columbus Register of Historic Properties
- Designated: December 10, 1984
- Reference no.: CR-33

Graham Elementary and Middle School, formerly Graham Expeditionary Middle School and Graham Primary School, is a public K-8 charter school in Columbus, Ohio, United States. It was originally the Indianola Junior High School, the first junior high school in the United States. The building was owned by the Columbus City Schools, though it became operated by the Graham Family of Schools, and was sold to the organization in 2017. 2009 was the middle school's centennial year. Shortly thereafter, the school board closed that building for the 2010 school year and merged the school with the former Indianola Alternative School (see below).

== History ==
The Columbus Board of Education formally approved the creation of junior high schools in Columbus, Ohio, on July 6, 1909, with Indianola Junior High School being the first. Its school building at 140 East 16th Avenue in Columbus still stands. In 1929, the school moved to a new building on 19th Avenue.

Largely because of increasing enrollment demands, in 2007 Indianola students moved to the old Everett Jr. High, which had been occupied by the Arts Impact Middle School. The Indianola building was left vacant. The building remained vacant until the Graham Expeditionary Middle School opened in 2010.

== See also ==
- Schools in Columbus, Ohio
