= North Columbus Commercial Historic District =

Historic district in Ohio, United States

- U.S. National Register of Historic Places
- U.S. Historic district
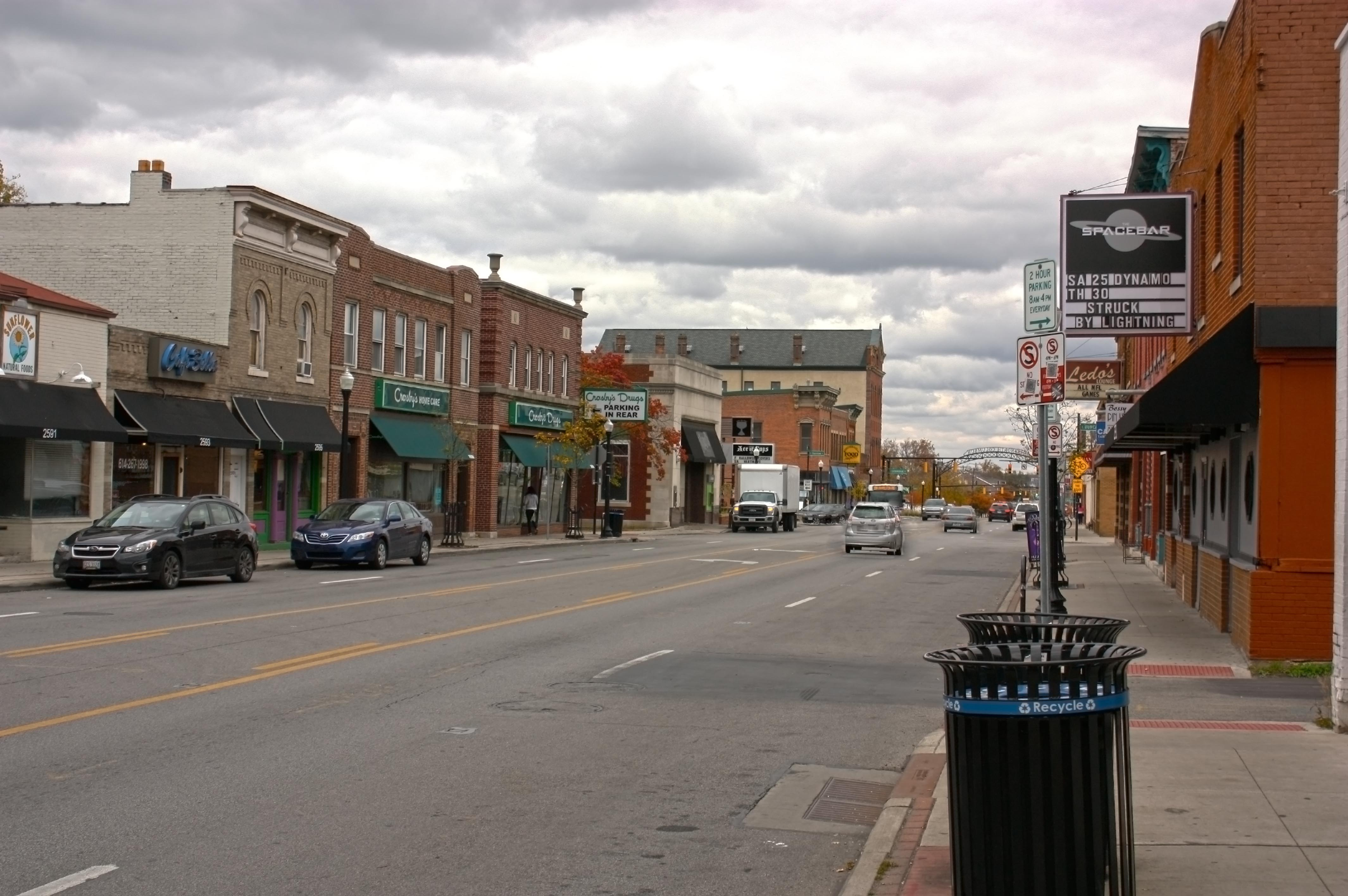
- Interactive map
- Location: Roughly centered on N. High St. between Hudson and Dodridge, Columbus, Ohio
- Coordinates: 40.015556°N 83.011667°W
- NRHP reference No.: 10000828
- Added to NRHP: October 14, 2010

The North Columbus Commercial Historic District is a historic district in the Old North Columbus neighborhood of Columbus, Ohio. It was listed on the National Register of Historic Places in 2010. The district is centered on High Street, one of the city's two main thoroughfares. The district has 25 buildings, all of which contribute to the district, and built from c. 1880 to 1960. Architectural styles range from Italianate to Tudor Revival and Neoclassical, with some Craftsman elements and one Modernist building.

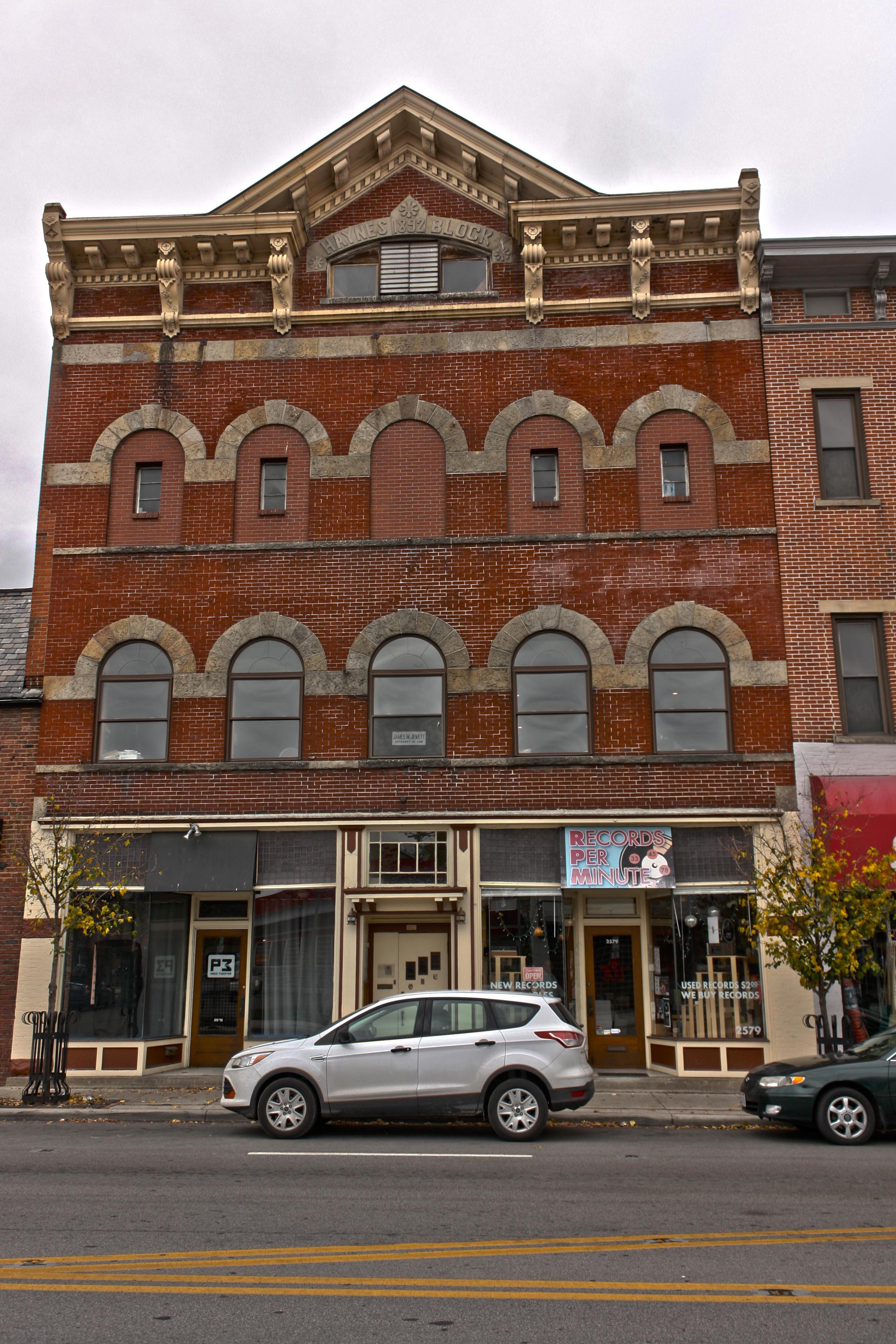
The Haynes Block, 2575-77 N. High

== See also ==
- National Register of Historic Places listings in Columbus, Ohio
