= 120 S. Central Avenue =

Office building in Columbus, Ohio

West High School
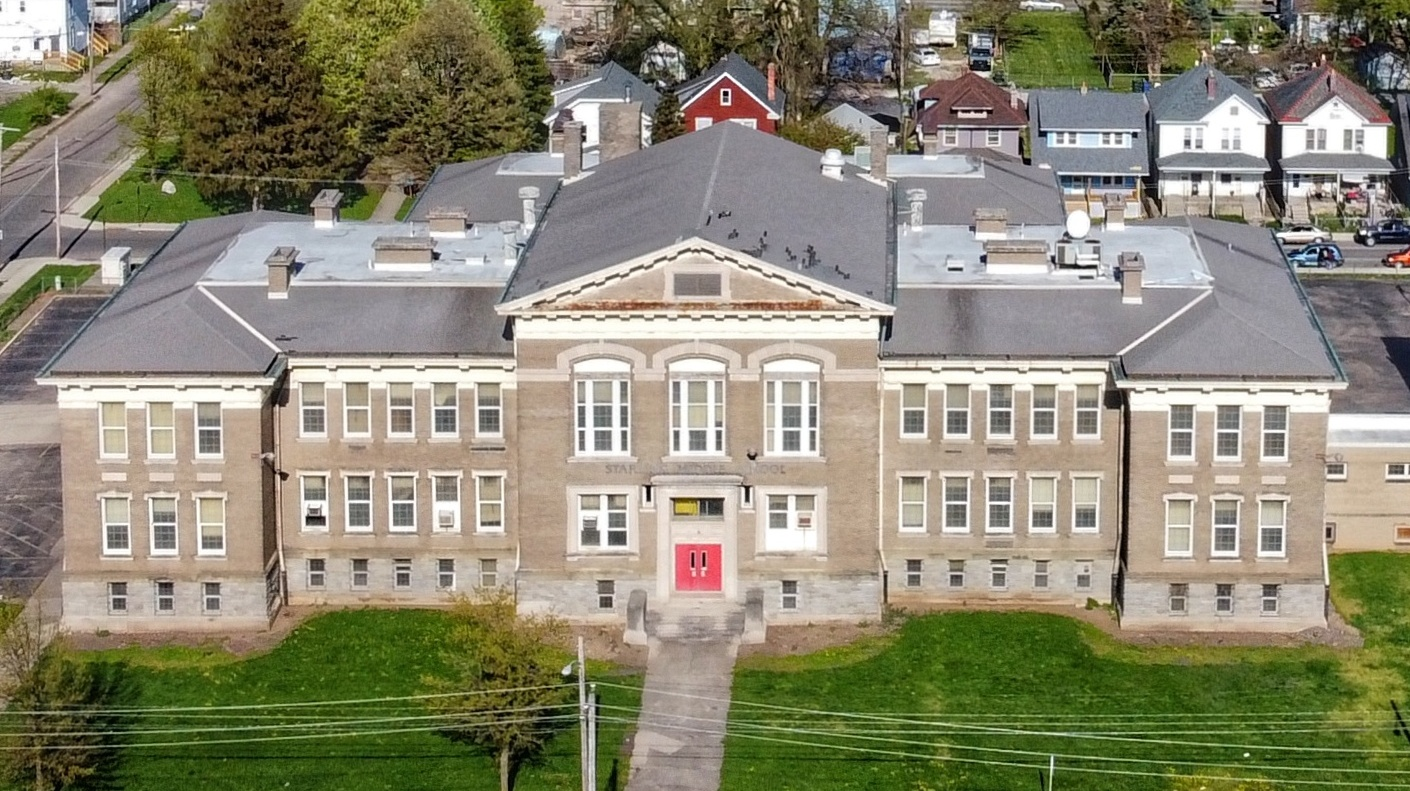
- 1908 building
- 39.9553°N 83.0372°W
- Location: 120 S. Central Avenue, Columbus, Ohio

History
- Built: 1908

Site notes
- Area: 1.824 acres (0.738 ha)
- Architect: David Riebel

U.S. National Register of Historic Places
- Designated: September 6, 2022
- Reference no.: 100008068

Columbus Register of Historic Properties
- Designated: February 14, 2022
- Reference no.: CR-81

120 S. Central Avenue is a former school building in the Franklinton neighborhood of Columbus, Ohio. The building was built for the West High School, and later served as Starling Middle School and Starling Elementary School. The building was added to the National Register of Historic Places and Columbus Register of Historic Properties in 2022.

== Attributes ==
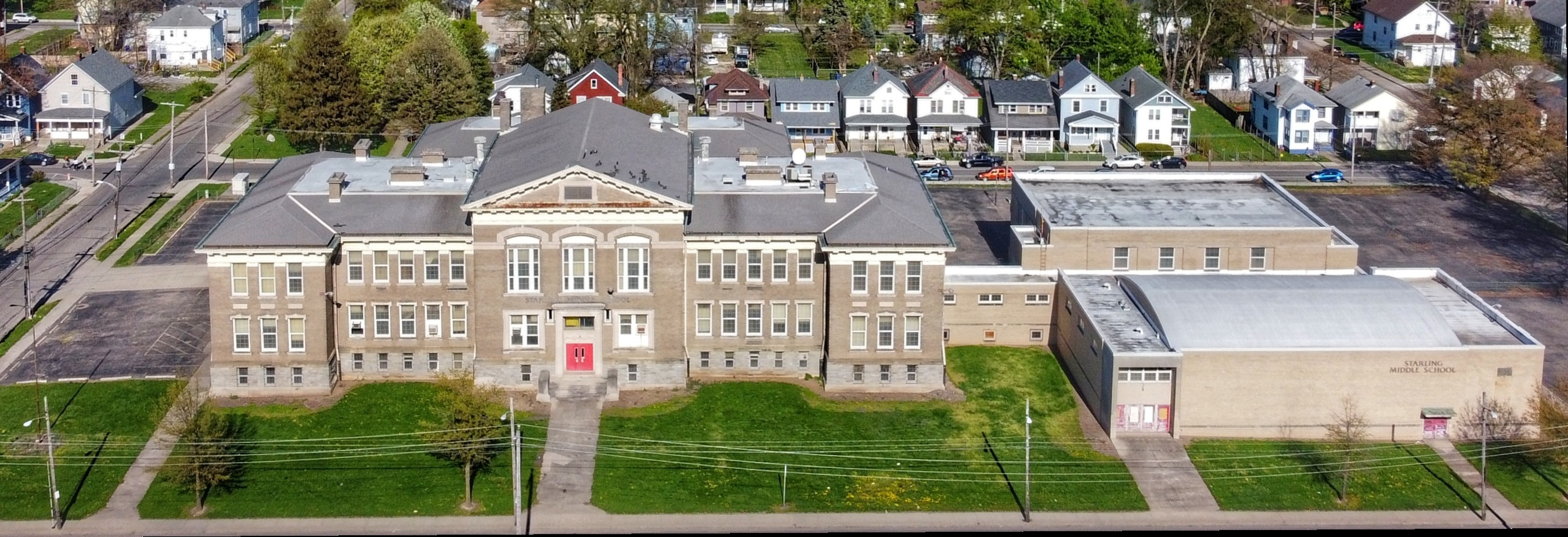
1908, 1926, and 1955 buildings

The building is situated in a residential part of the Franklinton neighborhood of Columbus, Ohio. It is on a 1.824 acres (0.738 ha) plot, bordered by Central Avenue to the west, State Street to the north, Town Street to the south, and Brehl Avenue to the east. The grounds include grassy lawns, sidewalks, and trees, as well as asphalt parking and play areas to the north and east of the building.

The school was designed in the Neoclassical style. It was made of blond brick, with a stone foundation and a symmetrical T-shaped layout. The original structure was designed by prominent Columbus school architect David Riebel. It has three projecting pediments; one at either end and one in the center. Its roof once had dormers on its facade and side elevations, no longer extant.

A rear addition was created in 1926, designed by Howard Dwight Smith, architect of the Ohio Stadium. This housed a cafeteria, five classrooms, two locker rooms, and sewing and mechanical drawings rooms. Another addition was completed in 1955. This addition was built in the International style, and contained a gymnasium and auditorium. It was not part of the building's nomination to the Columbus Register of Historic Properties.

The building's main entrance is at the center of the facade, with a sidewalk leading up to it, as well as stone steps with a stone rail near the door.

== History ==
The building was built for the West High School, and was converted to Starling Junior High School in 1929, when a new West High School was built. The school was eventually converted to become Starling Elementary School, and closed in 2012 when a new Starling Elementary School was constructed across the street, at 145 S. Central Avenue. The building has been vacant since c. 2014.

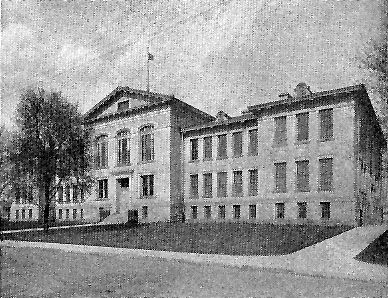
The original West High School building, seen in 1916

The school building was listed as one of several endangered properties in the city, in Columbus Landmarks' 2021 list. In 2022, it was announced that a Columbus developer plans to convert the building into units of affordable housing.

The building was added to the National Register of Historic Places and Columbus Register of Historic Properties in 2022.

== See also ==
- National Register of Historic Places listings in Columbus, Ohio
- Schools in Columbus, Ohio
