= Medary Avenue Elementary School =

School building in Columbus, Ohio

- Medary Elementary School
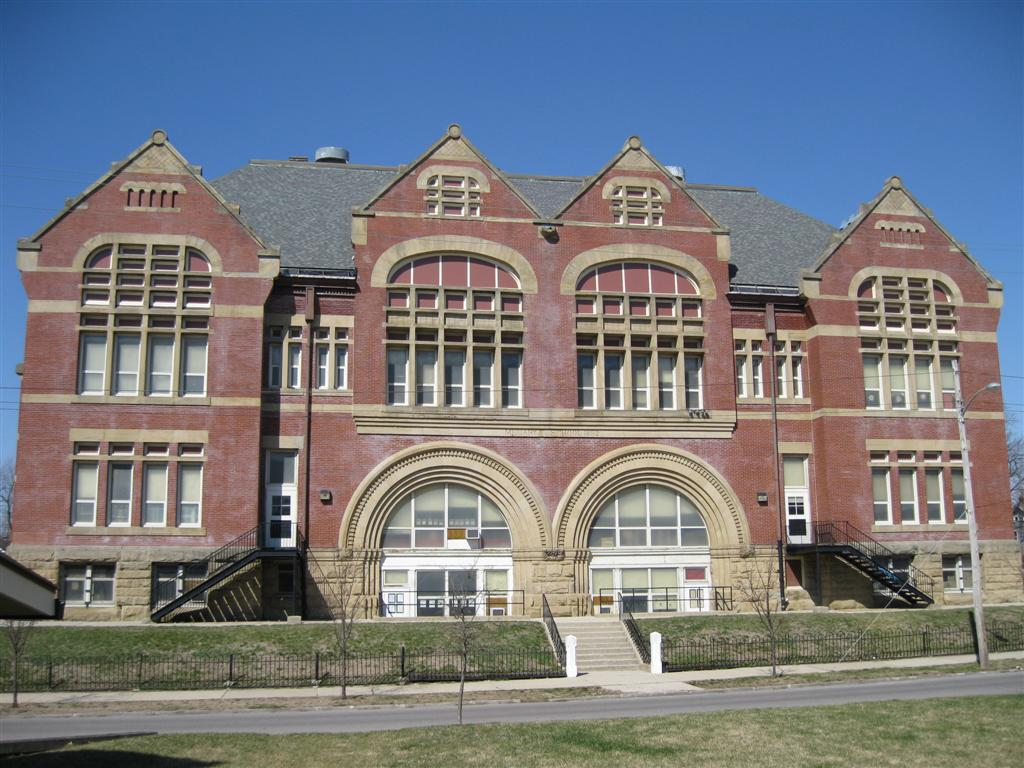
- Location: 2500 Medary Avenue, Columbus, Ohio
- Coordinates: 40.01455°N 83.00445°W
- Built: 1892
- Architect: David Riebel
- Architectural style(s): Richardsonian Romanesque

Medary Avenue Elementary School is a school building in the Old North Columbus neighborhood of Columbus, Ohio. The building was constructed in 1892 and was designed by prolific school architect David Riebel.

== Attributes ==
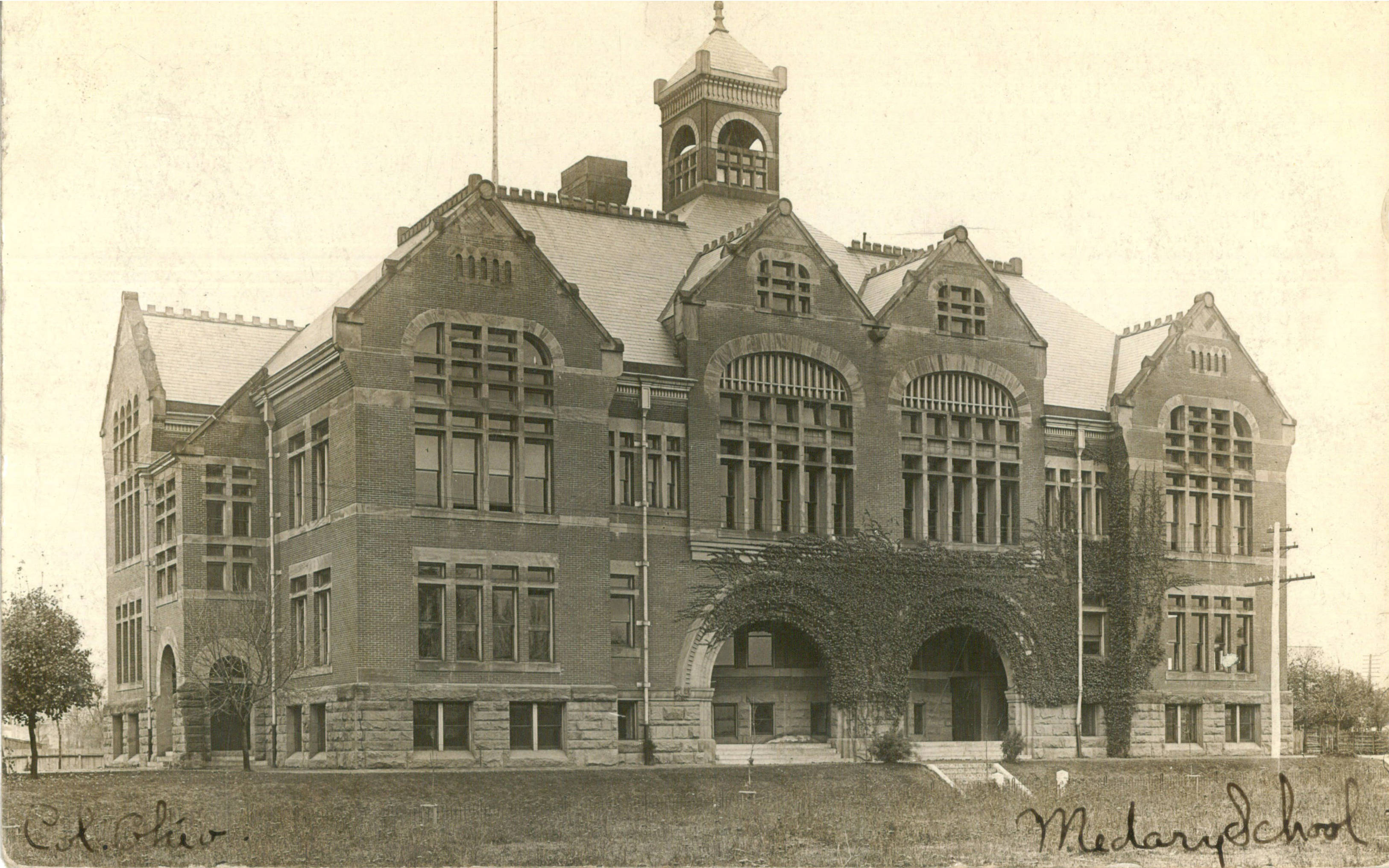
South facade c. 1908

The three-story building has a "monumental block-type design". It was built in the Richardsonian Romanesque style of architecture, which was a popular style for many public buildings throughout the late 19th century and early 20th century.

The school was recognized as one of Columbus's historically significant schools, in a 2002 report by the Columbus Landmarks Foundation. The building retains its historic details and character, and only has a single-story addition to its rear. The structure features many gables and gable wall dormers, an element prominently featuring in Riebel's 1890s designs. The building uses a combination of smooth-dressed and rock-faced stone. The south facade features large compound round-arched openings, supported by compound impost blocks, both carved and smooth.

== History ==
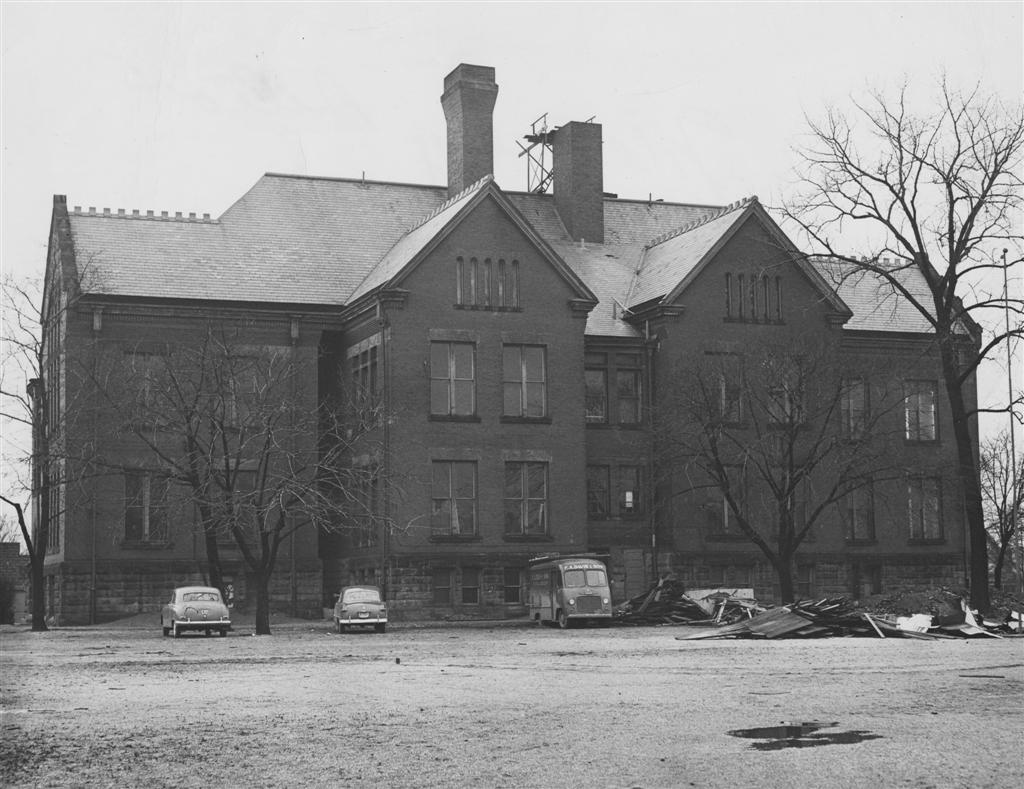
North facade in the 20th century

Medary Elementary School was built in 1892, designed by David Riebel, who was hired as the first Columbus Public Schools architect in 1893. The building was one of a few, including Avondale Elementary, designed by Riebel before he became the lead architect for Columbus City Schools.

During the era of segregation in public schools, white students were educated on a separate floor from Black students. At one time, the school's sole Black student was educated in a classroom near the janitor office and storage rooms, also on a separate floor.

Medary Elementary School closed in 2007 amid declining enrollment. At the time, the school served only 140 students, fewer than any other traditional elementary school in the district. While it had an unclear future, in 2008, the county sheriff's office performed school-shooting drills in the building, keeping the building in use.

The building then served as the primary school for Bridgeway Academy, formerly Helping Hands Center for Special Needs, from 2008 to 2021. Bridgeway purchased a property on Alum Creek Drive, consolidating its primary and secondary schools; it opened in 2021.

== See also ==
- Schools in Columbus, Ohio
