= David Riebel =

Ohio architect

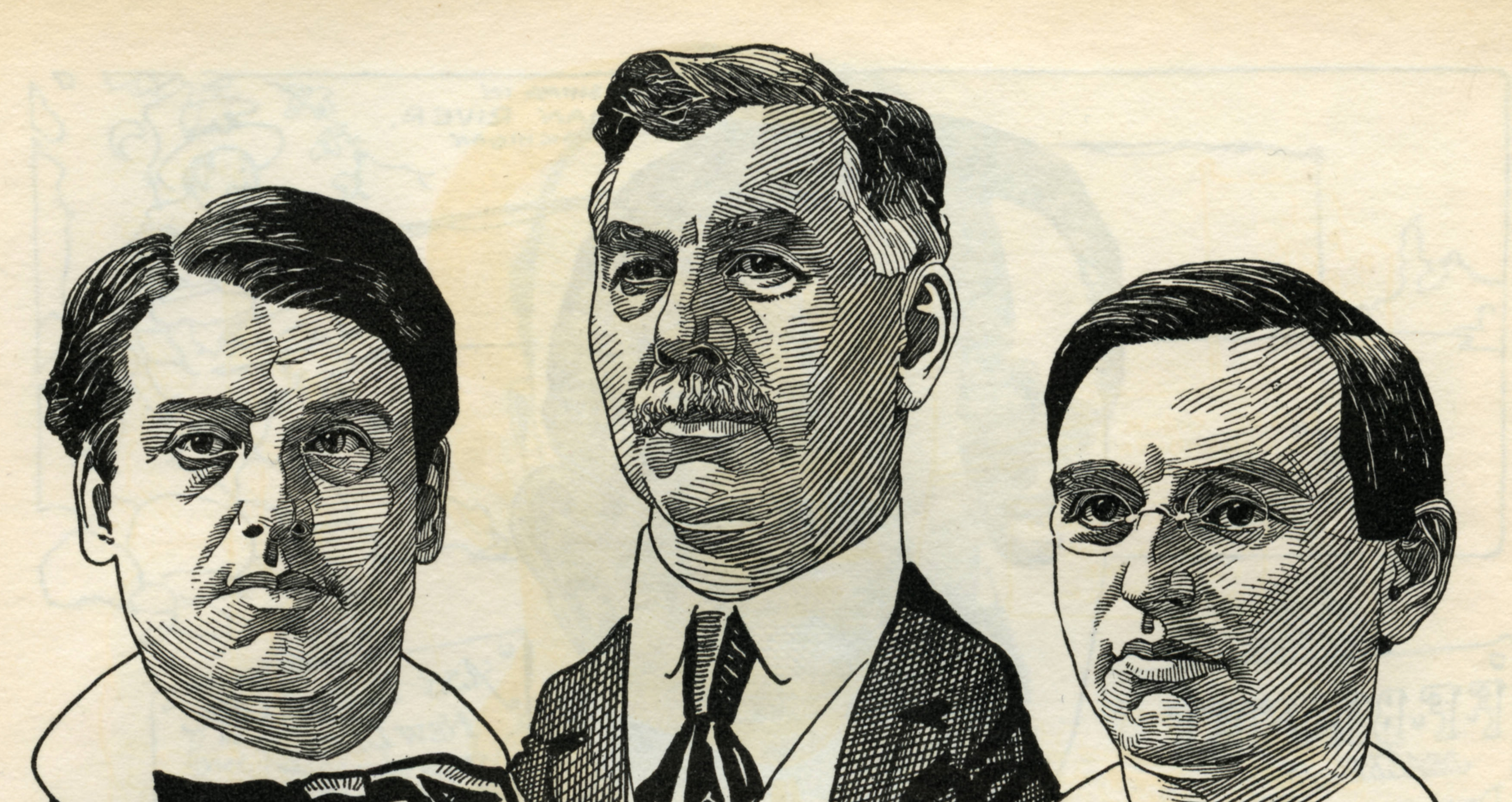
Elroy, David, and Frederick Riebel, architects for Riebel & Sons

David Riebel (August 7, 1855 – July 29, 1935) was a German-American architect in Columbus, Ohio. He was the head architect for the Columbus public school district from 1893 to 1922. In 1915, The Ohio Architect, Engineer and Builder considered his firm, David Riebel & Sons, to be the oldest and among the best architects in Columbus.

== Early life and career ==
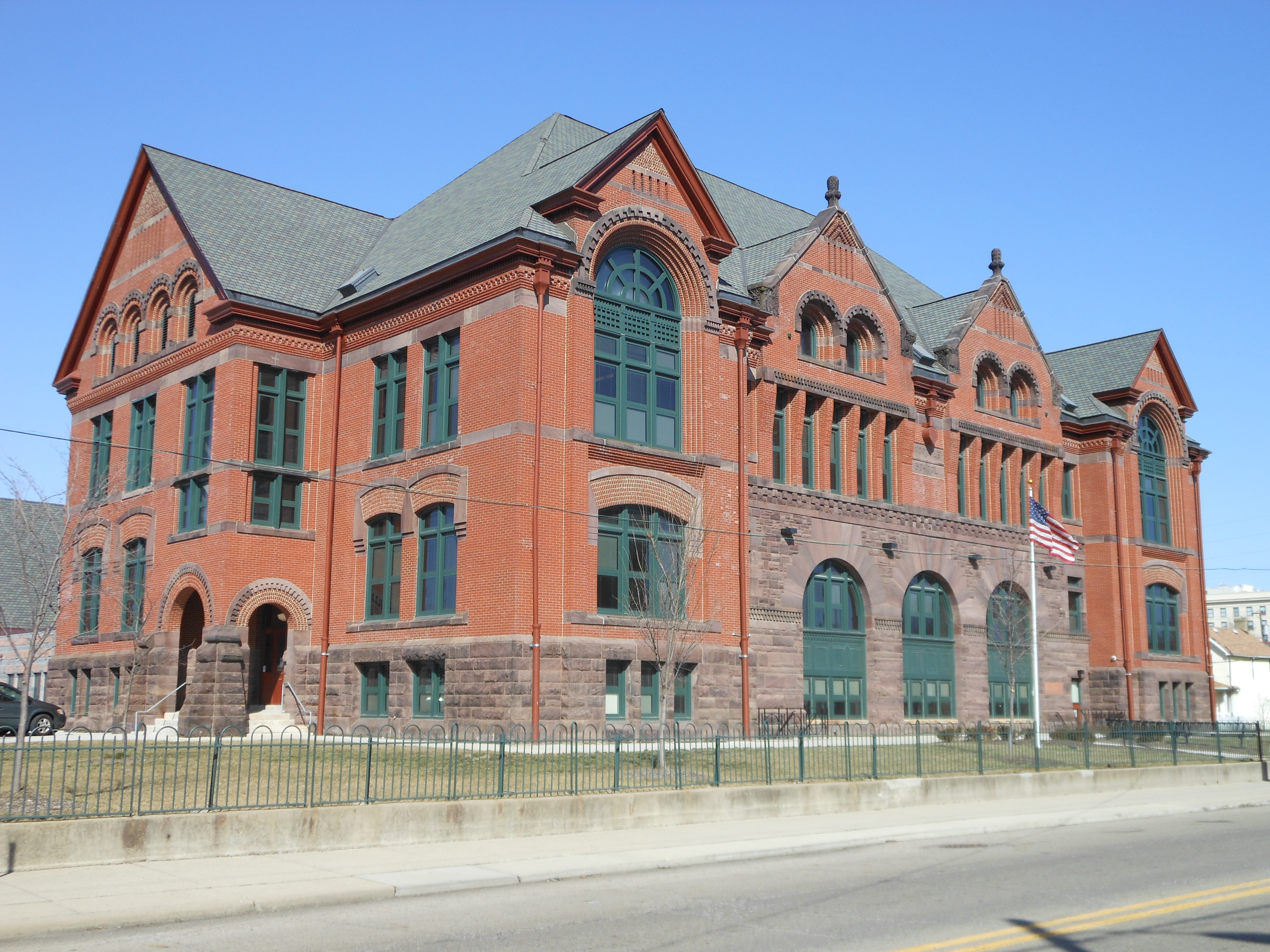
Avondale Elementary School

David Riebel was born on August 7, 1855, in Blenheim, Canada West. He was married in Bosanquet Township on November 3, 1875. At the time, he was described as a carpenter. With his wife, Margaret Ann Clemens, by 1895 he had four children: Laura, Elroy, Frederick, and Mary Edna.

Riebel began practicing architecture around 1878. His first major commissions were in Forest, Ontario: its town hall (built 1883-84, demolished in 1982) and the Second Empire-style mansion of Dr. James Hutton (built in 1887 and demolished in 1935).

Riebel moved with his family to Columbus, Ohio, in February 1888 to open up a new architectural office. He became the first head of the architectural department of the Columbus Board of Education (the lead architect for Columbus City Schools) in 1893. In that position, Riebel designed about 40 Columbus public school buildings between 1891 and 1921; the remaining buildings are some of Columbus's most notable landmarks. His two sons joined him in designing buildings in 1904, after thorough training, giving the firm the name "David Riebel & Sons". Riebel continued in the position until 1922.

For a time, Riebel had his offices in the William J. Lhota Building, originally known as the New First National Bank Building.

David Riebel died on July 29, 1935. He is buried at Green Lawn Cemetery.

== Works ==
=== In Columbus ===
Riebel was involved in the design of numerous Columbus buildings:

Name	Image	Address	Date completed	Status	Notes
Beck Street School		387 E. Beck Street	1884	In use	Used by the South Columbus Preparatory Academy
Avondale Elementary School		141 Hawkes Avenue	1892	In use	In use by Columbus City Schools
Medary Avenue Elementary School		2500 Medary Avenue	1892	Vacant	Bridgeway Academy vacated in 2021
Felton School		920 Leonard Avenue	1893	Demolished	Nearly identical to the extant Southwood Elementary School
The Ohio Street School / Ohio Avenue Elementary School		505 S. Ohio Avenue	1893	In use	In use by Columbus City Schools
The Great Southern Hotel & Theatre		310 S. High Street	1894	In use	Credited to Dauben, Krumm, and Riebel
Hubbard Avenue School / Hubbard Mastery School		104 W. Hubbard Avenue	1894	In use	In use by Columbus City Schools
Southwood Elementary School		1500 S. Fourth Street	1894	In use	In use by Columbus City Schools
Highland Avenue Elementary School		40 S. Highland Avenue	1895	In use	In use by Columbus City Schools
The Schlee-Kemmler Building		328 S. High Street	1895	In use	Credited to Dauben, Krumm, and Riebel
Chicago Avenue School		40 Chicago Avenue	1897	In use	Operated by Franklinton Prep High School
Ninth Avenue Elementary School		221 W. 9th Avenue	1897	Demolished	
St. John the Baptist Church		168 E. Lincoln Street	1898		Neighboring matching Gothic Revival convent demolished and reconstructed in 1991.
North Side High School addition		100 W. Fourth Avenue	1899	Demolished (original building); In use (additions)	C. 1899 addition by Riebel, in use by Columbus City Schools.
East High School / Franklin Junior High School		1390 Franklin Avenue	1899	Demolished	Visually similar to the extant Charles S. Barrett Building
South High School / the Charles S. Barrett Building		345 E. Deshler Avenue	1900	In use	Used as an apartment building
Livingston Elementary School		825 E. Livingston Avenue; 744 Heyl Avenue	1901	Demolished	Replaced with a new structure
Mansion Day School / William A. Miller Residence		72 Woodland Avenue	1904	In use	
Bellows Avenue Elementary School / Bellows School		725 Bellows Avenue	1905	Vacant	Under renovation, at risk of demolition
Fourth Avenue School / Michigan Avenue School		1200 Michigan Avenue	1905	In use	In use as the Michigan Avenue Apartments
Holy Rosary Elementary School		1667 E. Main St.	1906	Demolished in 1973	
St. John the Evangelist School		930 South Ohio Avenue	1906	In use	In use as the St. John Community Center
Shepard School		873 Walcutt Avenue	1906	In use	Closed 1977; now used as offices
Eastwood Avenue Elementary School		1355 Eastwood Avenue	1907	Demolished	Closed in 1974. David Riebel design.
West High School / Starling Middle School		120 S. Central Avenue	1908	Vacant	Under renovation into apartments
Indianola Junior High School / Graham Elementary and Middle School		140 E. 16th Avenue	1909	In use	Part of the Graham Family of Schools
Reeb Avenue Elementary School / the Reeb Avenue Center		280 Reeb Avenue	1909	In use	Multi-use building operated by a nonprofit
Champion Elementary School		1270 Hawthorne Avenue	1909	Demolished	Formerly in the center of Poindexter Village, demolished c. 2008
West Broad Street School / West Broad Elementary School		2744 W. Broad Street	1910	In use	In use by Columbus City Schools
Heyl Elementary School		760 Reinhard Avenue	1910	Demolished	Replaced with affordable housing
Lane Avenue School / Laneview School		2366 Kenny Road	1910	Demolished	Used as OSU farm storage later in its history
The Stoddart Block		260 S. 4th Street	1911	In use	Renovated for micro-apartments
Dana Avenue School		300 Dana Avenue	1912	In use	Part of Columbus Collegiate Academy
Hotel Columbus		235 E Long Street	1912	Demolished	Site of an apartment building today
Holy Family School		57 S. Grubb Street	1913	Vacant	
Crestview School / Indianola Informal K8 School		251 E. Weber Road	1915	In use	In use by Columbus City Schools
Roosevelt Junior High School / Studer Avenue School		1046 Studer Avenue	1916	Demolished	
Budd Dairy Company		1086 N. 4th Street	1917	In use	Active as a food hall
The Seneca Hotel		367 E. Broad Street	1917	In use	Co-designed by Frank Packard. Active as apartments.
Fulton Street Elementary School		450 E. Fulton Street	1921	Demolished	Closed in 1974
Burroughs Elementary School / John Burroughs School / Sullivant Avenue School		551 S. Richardson Avenue	1921	In use	In use by Columbus City Schools
Linden Elementary School	Non-free image	2626 Westerville Road	1921	Demolished	Replaced by Linden S.T.E.M. Academy in 2004
Pilgrim Elementary School		440 Taylor Avenue	1922	Vacant	Closed 2008 and sold PACT in 2015

=== Outside Columbus ===
Works in other areas included:

- Public school (Worthington, Ohio, 1896)
- Town Hall (Forest, Ontario, 1883-4)
- Dr. James Hutton mansion (Forest, Ontario, 1887)
- St. Mary's School (Lancaster, Ohio, 1910)
- First Church of Christ Scientist (Lancaster, Ohio, 1921)
- Public school (Crooksville, Ohio, 1923)

== See also ==
- Architecture of Columbus, Ohio
