= Southwood Elementary School =

School in Columbus, Ohio

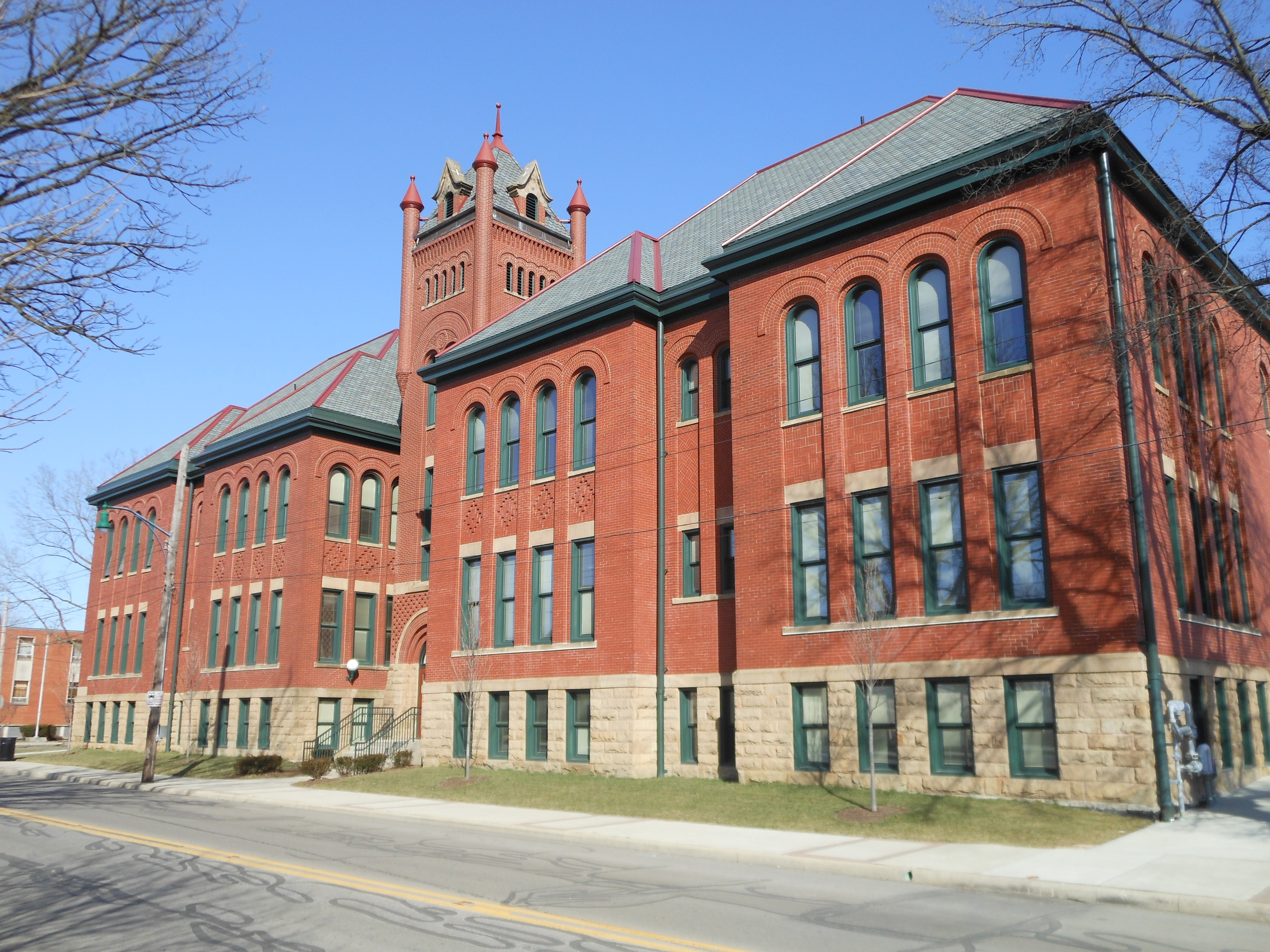
- 39.931936°N 82.992563°W
- Location: 1500 S. Fourth Street, Columbus, Ohio

History
- Built: December 1894

Site notes
- Architect: David Riebel
- Architectural style: Richardsonian Romanesque
- Website: www.ccsoh.us/southwoodes

Columbus Register of Historic Properties
- Designated: June 25, 2002
- Reference no.: CR-57

Southwood Elementary School is a public elementary school in Columbus, Ohio, part of Columbus City Schools. The school building, located in the city's Merion Village neighborhood, was completed in 1894 and was designed by David Riebel. It was added to the Columbus Register of Historic Properties in 2002.

The school opened on December 3, 1894. The first principal, Mary K. Esper, held the position from 1894 to 1923. The next principal, Elizabeth Jung, held the role from 1923 to 1930. During the 1995 school year, the school celebrated its 100-year anniversary with numerous events. In 2007, the building underwent renovations. During remodeling, workers removed chalkboards dating to the 1930s-1940s and uncovered chalkboards likely original to the building. A few had chalk murals, and the Columbus Dispatch reported at the time that they might be preserved as historical artifacts if the school district permitted it.

The school building was the first designed by Riebel in Merion Village. It was built in the Richardsonian Romanesque style, and features a monumental central tower. It is nearly identical to the Felton School, also designed by Riebel, built one year earlier, and demolished in 1990.

== See also ==
- Schools in Columbus, Ohio
