= Corpus Christi Church (Columbus, Ohio) =

Catholic church in Ohio, US, 1952–2025

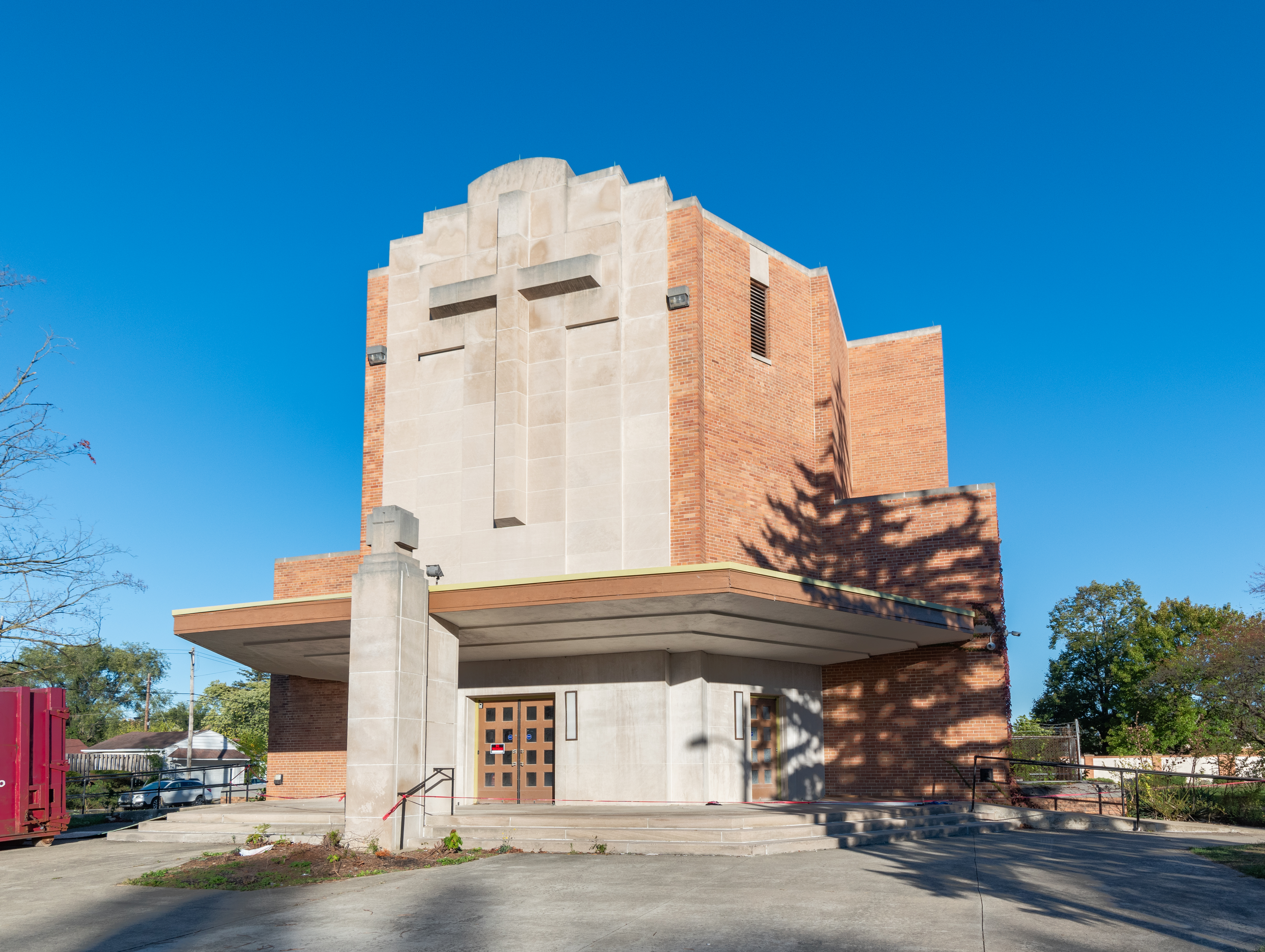
- Corpus Christi Church
- 39.9404°N 82.9661°W
- Address: 111 Stewart Avenue; Columbus, Ohio, US
- Denomination: Catholic
- Religious institute: Franciscan Order of Friars Minor (1986-1993)

History
- Founded: 1922
- Dedication: May 18, 1952

Architecture
- Architect(s): Ramsay and Croce
- Style: Modern
- Groundbreaking: March 4, 1951
- Construction cost: $400,000
- Closed: July 1, 2023
- Demolished: December 2, 2025

Specifications
- Capacity: 700
- Materials: Indiana limestone

Administration
- Diocese: Roman Catholic Diocese of Columbus
- Parish: Saint Mary, Mother of God

Corpus Christi Church was a Catholic parish church of the Diocese of Columbus located in the South Side of the city of Columbus, Ohio, United States. The parish was founded in 1922 and the current Modern-style church was completed in 1951. In 2023, the parish was suppressed and merged with Saint Mary Church in neighboring German Village. Two years later the church property was sold for $1.2 million to a developer who demolished the building in December 2025.

== History ==
=== Founding ===
In 1922, Corpus Christi parish was established on the southeastern side of the city of Columbus by bishop James Hartley with the majority of its territory being taken from St. John the Evangelist parish. Fr. Edmund Burkley, then assistant at St. Mary Church, was appointed pastor by July 1923 and began purchasing land in September of the same year. Ground was broken for the first parish building -- a combined church, school, and convent -- in March 1925, and in the summer a rectory was added to the property. In May 1928 a convent to house Franciscan Sisters of the Sacred Heart, who had taught at the parish school beginning in September 1925, was built. Continued growth made the construction of a basement chapel necessary, which was completed in 1930. This building was intended to eventually become part of a school auditorium. In addition to a primary school, the parish ran a two-year high school beginning in 1935, with most students transferring to St. Mary High School for the final two years. Due to an increased need for teachers and classroom space, it ceased operations in 1950.

=== Current church ===
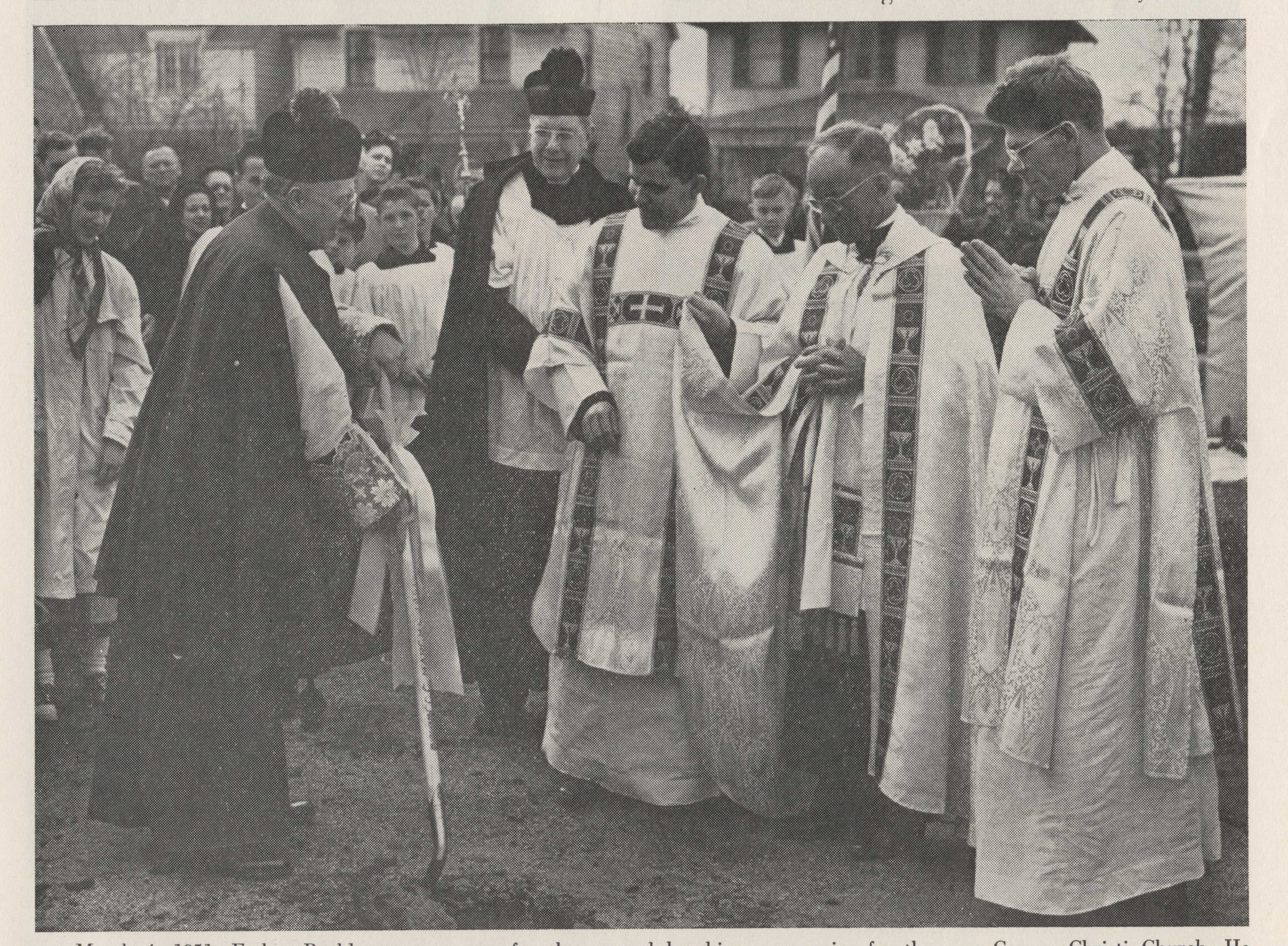
Fr. Edmund Burkley, the founding pastor of Corpus Christi, breaking ground for the 1951 church building. At this time he was pastor of St. Mary Church.

Fundraising began for a purpose-built church in 1944 following the payment of all debts for the basement chapel, and ground for the new church was broken on March 4, 1951. On August 12, bishop Michael Ready laid the cornerstone for the present Modern-style church, which was completed and dedicated on May 18, 1952, by Ready. The altar was consecrated by auxiliary bishop Edward Hettinger on December 26. In 1953, Corpus Christi's parochial school had eleven sets of twins enrolled for classes. That same year, members of the parish founded a credit union, the only one of its kind among the Catholic churches in Columbus. A six-room addition to the school was made in 1956 and a new athletic center constructed and dedicated in 1961. Membership in the parish began to decline in the 1960s due to parishioners moving to the suburbs. In 1986, staffing and pastoral care of the parish was given to priests of the Franciscan Order of Friars Minor, who remained in the parish until around 1993.

=== Consolidation, closure, and demolition ===
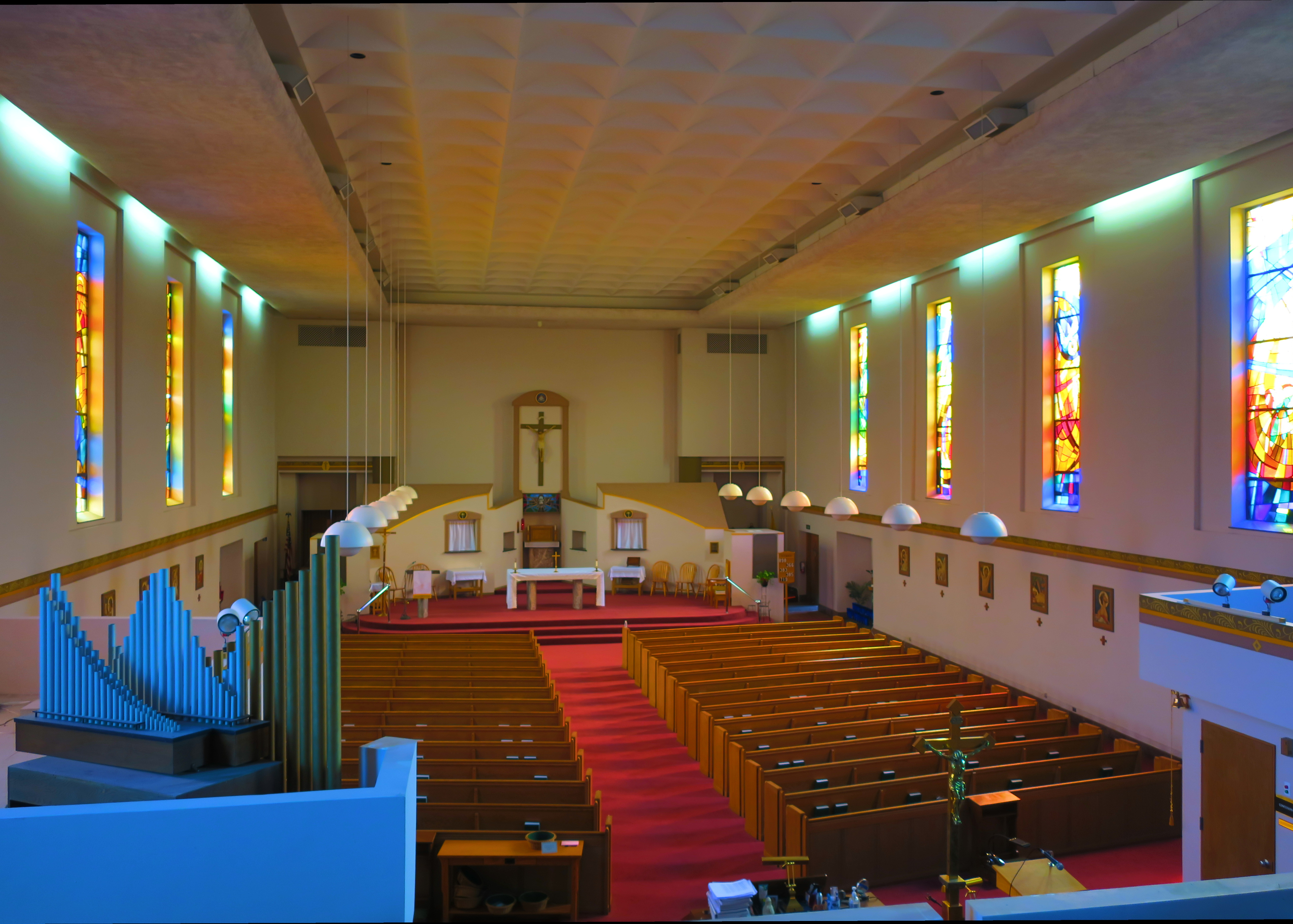
The interior of Corpus Christi as seen from the choir loft in 2021

In 1987, the Columbus diocese began to study solutions to deal with declining enrollment and rising costs at Corpus Christi school, as well as other neighboring schools including St. Leo and St. Mary. Two years later, Corpus Christi and St. Ladislas schools merged, with 5th through 8th grades being housed at the Corpus Christi campus. The merger resulted in $100,000 in savings annually. The merged school closed in June 1993. By 1999, St. Ladislas and Corpus Christi parishes were administratively merged but with each location continuing to host Masses. The rectory at Corpus Christi served as the home of the Dominican Learning Center, an apostolate of the Dominican Sisters of Peace, from its founding in 1994 until it moved to new facilities at St. Mary. During its time at Corpus Christi, the center served over 6,000 people with General Educational Development assistance, English as a second language classes, and other basic adult education courses. In 2013, Corpus Christi and St. Ladislas were clustered with St. Mary. On July 1, 2023, Earl K. Fernandes merged the two churches into St. Mary, with the last Sunday Masses being said at each church on June 25, 2023. The closed property was purchased by Healthy Homes, an affordable housing initiative of Nationwide Children's Hospital and Community Development For All People, in July 2025 for $1.2 million. The church building was demolished in December of 2025 as a condition of the purchase at the Diocese's request.The developer plans to construct affordable housing on its site.

== Architecture ==
Upon its completion, the 1952 church building was described as "modern in every design" and featured seating for 700, a mosaic tile floor, a mural depicting a Corpus Christi procession, and a large stone cross on the front of the church. It was built of brick and Indiana limestone, designed by the Columbus architects Ramsay and Croce, and cost $400,000. The Stations of the Cross were executed in oil painting by Conrad Schmitt and the church had a cry room along with preinstalled hearing aids.
