= Columbus Landmarks =

Historic preservation foundation in Ohio

Columbus Landmarks Foundation

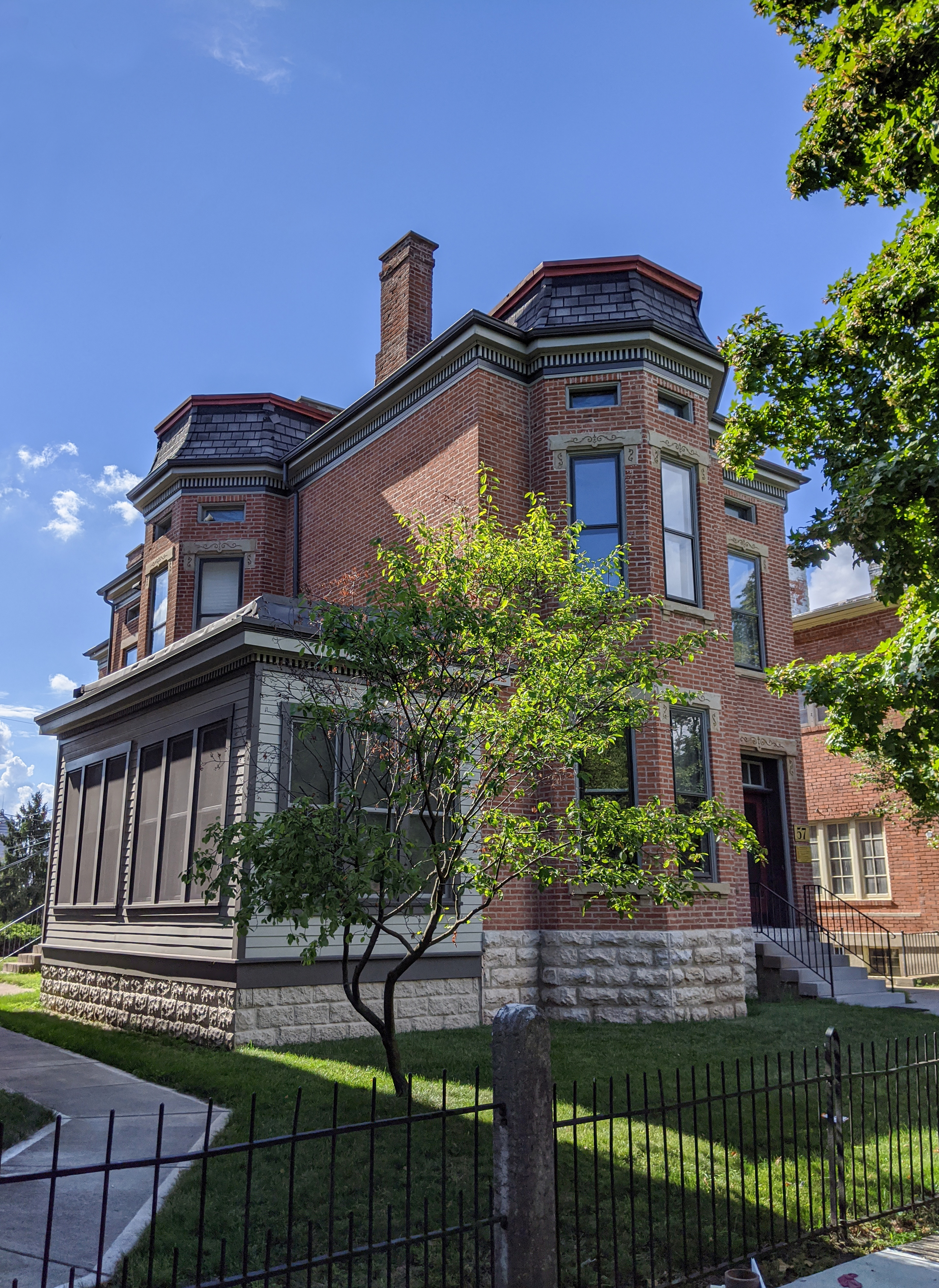
- Foundation office
- Established: 1977
- Location: 57 Jefferson Avenue, Columbus, Ohio
- Coordinates: 39.965336°N 82.985137°W
- President: Peter Krajnak
- CEO: Rebecca F. Kemper
- Website: columbuslandmarks.org

U.S. National Register of Historic Places
- Designated: December 2, 1982
- Part of: Jefferson Avenue Historic District
- Reference no.: #82001459

Columbus Register of Historic Properties
- Designated: December 12, 1983
- Part of: Jefferson Avenue Historic District
- Reference no.: CR-23

The Columbus Landmarks Foundation, known as Columbus Landmarks, is a nonprofit historic preservation organization in Columbus, Ohio. The foundation is best-known for its list of endangered sites in the city and its annual design award, given to buildings, landscapes, and other sites created or renovated in Columbus. It was established in 1977 as a project of the Junior League of Columbus, Ohio, following the demolition of the city's historic Union Station. It is headquartered at 57 Jefferson Avenue, a contributing structure in the Jefferson Avenue Historic District in Downtown Columbus.

== History ==
The organization was founded in July 1977. It had its origins with the demolition of Union Station, the Daniel Burnham-designed train station torn down in the 1970s. Local residents were disappointed with the destruction of numerous iconic buildings, which had set the city apart from others of its size, including Union Station, the Central Market, the second Franklin County Courthouse, the Deshler Hotel, and the Peruna Building.

Around 1980, the organization was headquartered at 22 N. Front St., a small office space decorated with photographs of Union Station and desktops adorned with terra cotta remnants of the train station arcade. It had about 650 members, three part-time, and two full-time staff, as well as a large group of volunteers.

In 2018, the foundation changed branding, including the design of a new logo which features the Union Station arch.

== Activities ==
As of 2019, the Columbus Landmarks Foundation has 1,500 members and corporations. Activities include hosting about 75 tours and events each year and publishing an annual list of endangered sites in the city. The foundation also awards the Ed Lentz Prize for history and preservation projects, created in honor of its Director Emeritus in 2019; he is considered the preeminent Columbus historian.

The Columbus Landmarks Foundation has two funds for preservation of central Ohio buildings, both announced in 2020. Its endangered properties fund is for purchasing or securing options for historic buildings at risk of demolition, and is funded by a $200,000 bequest made in 2009 from a family fund at the Columbus Foundation. Properties purchased are to be resold along with a preservation easement to owners aiming to preserve the property. Proceeds from the resale are to be returned to the fund. The other fund, for home preservation loans, provides loans with low interest rates to homeowners wishing to repair and maintain historic houses. The fund is aimed toward affordable neighborhoods, rather than upper-class areas like Victorian Village and German Village. The initial funding was $100,000 from a personal estate.

The organization's first revolving fund for rehabilitating buildings was initiated around 1980. The first project using the fund was rehabilitation of 1063, 1065, and 1435 Oak Street, National Register-listed properties.

=== Headquarters ===
The organization is headquartered at 57 Jefferson Avenue, part of the Jefferson Avenue Center in Downtown Columbus, and a contributing building to the Jefferson Avenue Historic District. The building is a two-story residential-style structure with a mansard roof. It has narrow windows with incised lintels, similar to other buildings in the historic district. Towards the building's cornice are small rectangular frieze windows. The south façade includes a full bay window. An addition to the building's south side is of an unknown age. The property is separated from the sidewalk by an iron fence with limestone posts.

=== Endangered properties list ===
Columbus Landmarks publishes an annual list of the most endangered properties in the city. The list is aimed to raise awareness to the sites' history and redevelopment potential. The endangered site list was first released in May 2014.

Sites added to the list are left abandoned or at risk of demolition, are at least 50 years in age, and contribute to the value and culture of Columbus. The organization recognizes five priority neighborhoods – areas that have faced historical disinvestment, and with the greatest historic building losses. The Hilltop, Linden, Milo-Grogan, King-Lincoln Bronzeville and the South Side are prioritized on the list.

=== Design award ===
Columbus Landmarks also hosts the annual James B. Recchie Design Award, given to quality urban designs for new and existing buildings, parks, public art, and other spaces. The award was first given in 1984, in memory of one of the organization's founding trustees.

Award winners include:

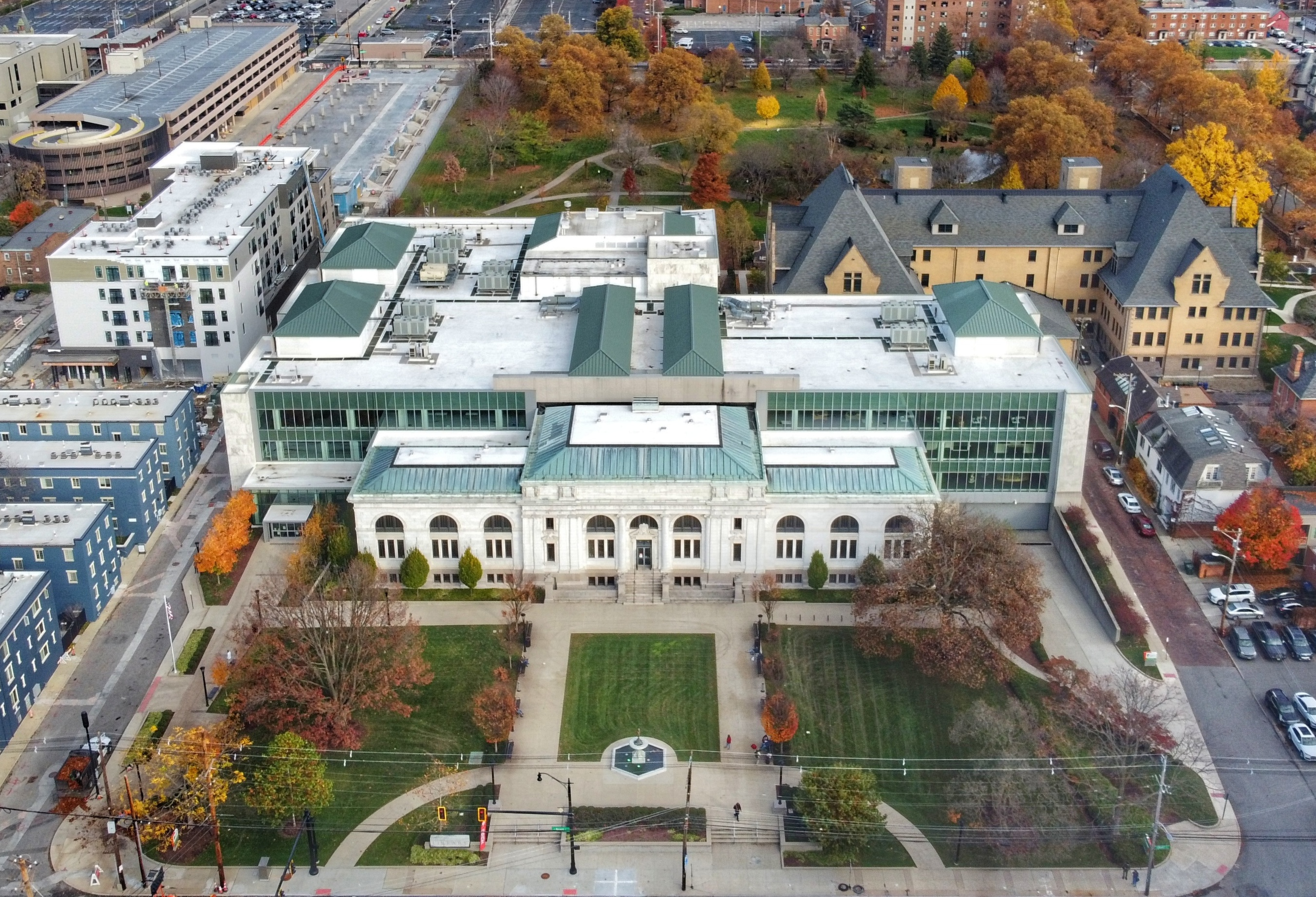
Columbus Metropolitan Library Main Library

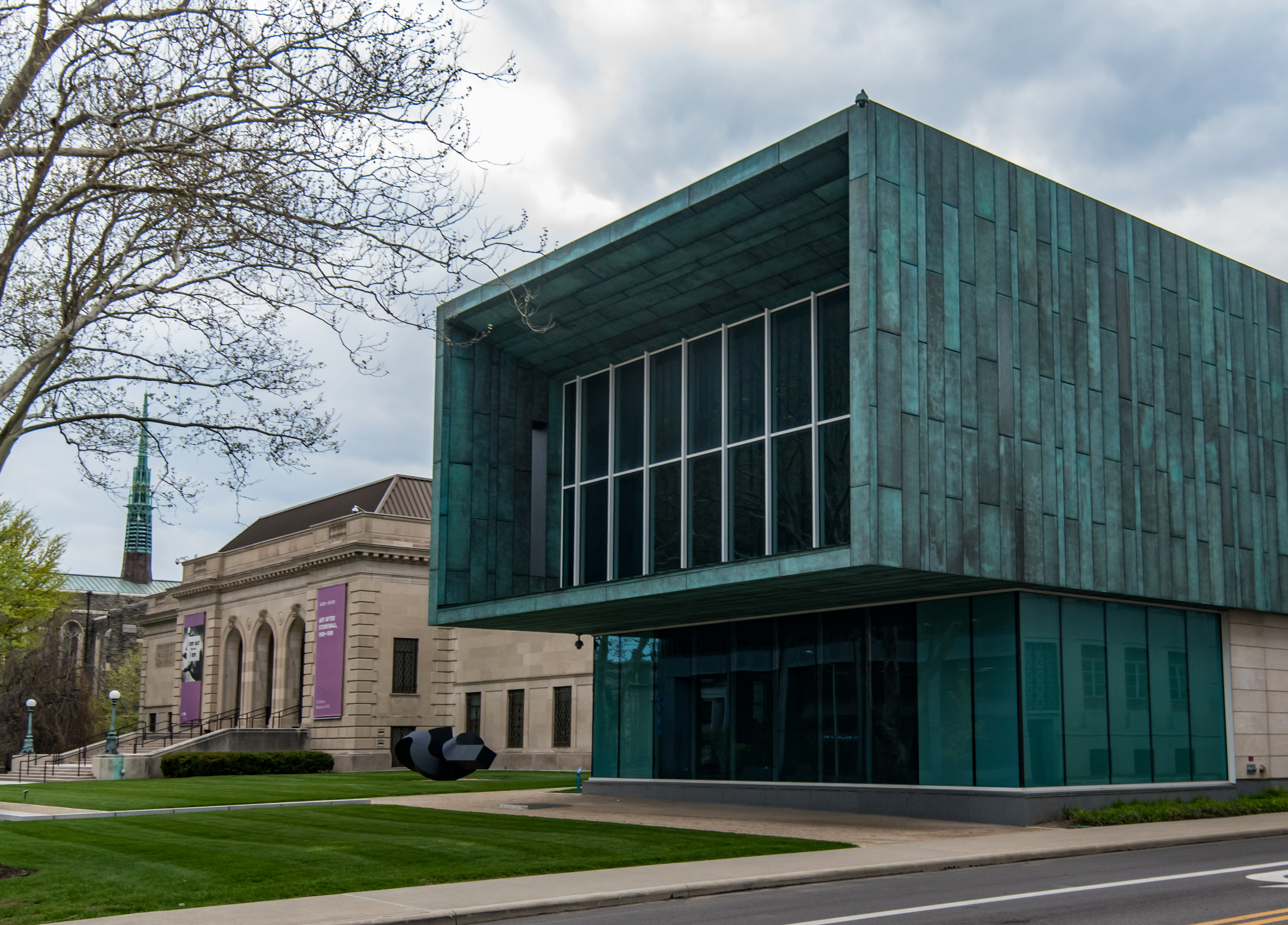
Columbus Museum of Art

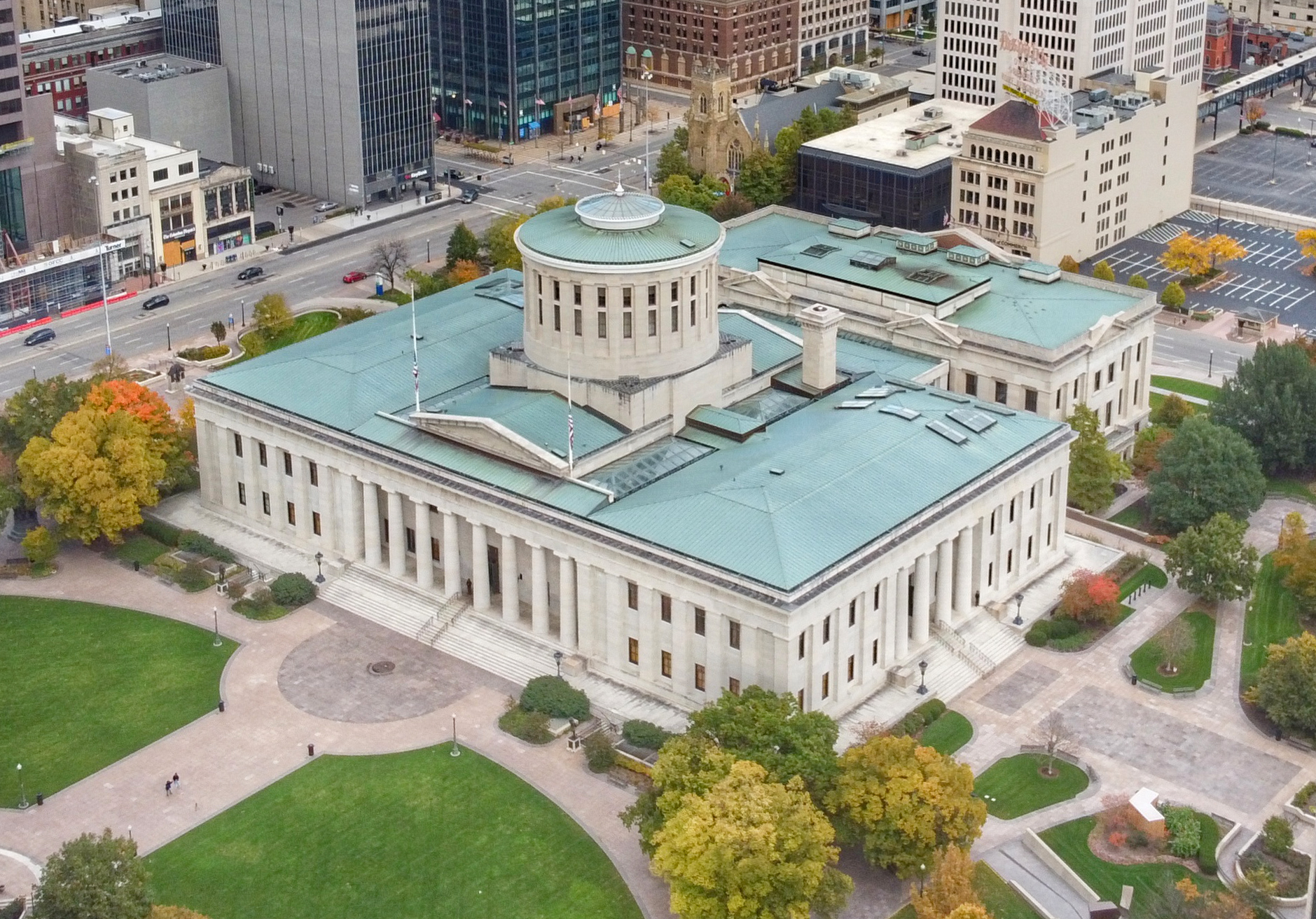
Ohio Statehouse

- Municipal Light Plant (2022)
- Lower.com Field (2021)
- Columbus Metropolitan Library Main Library (2019)
- Columbus Metropolitan Library Northside Branch (2018)
- Nationwide Children's Hospital (2017)
- Columbus Museum of Art (2016)
- Columbus Metropolitan Library Driving Park Branch (2015)
- The Jack (2014)
- Scioto Mile and Main and Rich Street bridges (2012)
- Lincoln Theatre (2011)
- Franklin Park Residence and Gardens (2010)
- Thompson Library (2009)
- Community Properties (2008)
- North Bank Park and pavilion (2007)
- New Village Homes (2006)
- The I-670 Cap (2005)
- Ohio Judicial Center (2004)
- Central Ohio Fire Museum (2003)
- Arena District (2002)
- Smith Bros. Hardware Building (2000)
- Ohio Statehouse (1999)
- Topiary Park (1995)
- Greater Columbus Convention Center (1993)
- St. Turibius Chapel, Pontifical College Josephinum (1992)
- Columbus Metropolitan Library Main Library (1991)
- United States Post Office and Courthouse (1990)
- Son of Heaven exhibit (1989)
- St. Mary's Church interior (1988)
- Martin Luther King, Jr. Center for Performing Arts (1987)
- Short North, Wood Companies (1986)
- Ohio Theatre's Galbreath Pavilion (1985)
- Trott & Associates (1984)

== See also ==
- Columbus Historical Society
