= William O'Rourke =

William O'Rourke may refer to:

- William O'Rourke (writer)
- Will O'Rourke (cricketer)
- Billy O'Rourke, English footballer
