= Beck Street School =

Historic school building in Columbus, Ohio

- U.S. Historic district – Contributing property
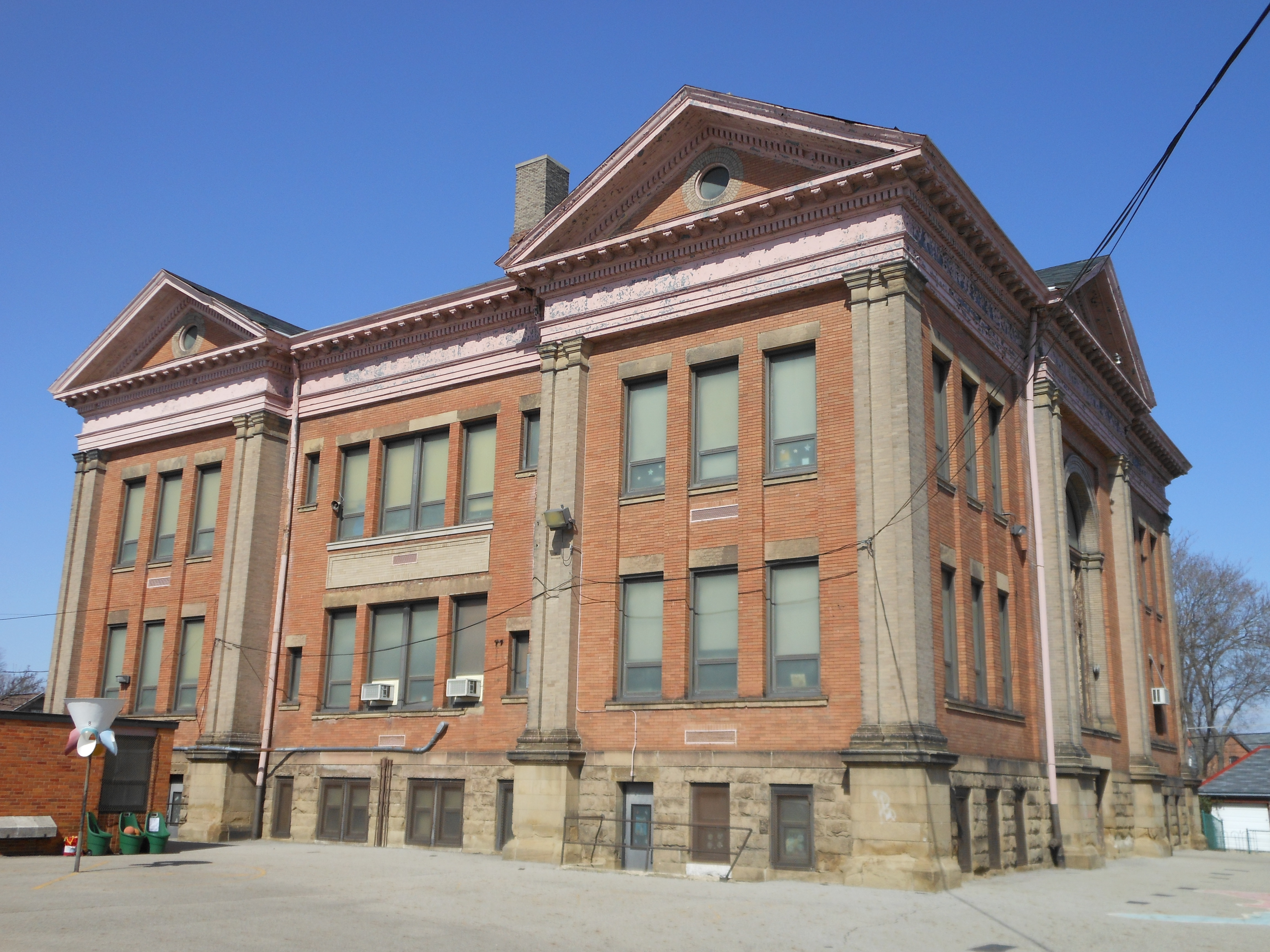
- Interactive map of Beck Street School
- Location: 387 East Beck Street, Columbus, Ohio
- Coordinates: 39.950218°N 82.987749°W
- Built: 1884
- Architect: David Riebel
- Architectural style: Renaissance Revival, Neoclassical
- Part of: German Village (ID80002998)

Beck Street School is a school building in the Schumacher Place neighborhood of Columbus, Ohio. The building was constructed in 1884 and was designed by prolific school architect David Riebel. In a 2002 report by the Columbus Landmarks Foundation, the school was recognized as one of Columbus's historically significant schools

== Attributes ==
The Beck Street school is in the Schumacher Place neighborhood of Columbus, Ohio, near German Village.

The three-story building has a symmetrical "monumental block-type design". It was built with influences from Neoclassical and Renaissance Revival architecture. The building sits on a massive stone foundation.

It was recognized as one of Columbus's historically significant schools, in a 2002 report by the Columbus Landmarks Foundation. The building retains its historic details and character, and only has a single-story addition to its side and rear.

== History ==
Before the school was built, the site was home to the main building of the Franklin County Poor House, built in 1840 and renamed the Franklin County Infirmary in 1850. The building caught fire in 1878 and was repaired, though the facility purchased a new space on Alum Creek Drive in 1882 and moved there in the following year. The building was attempted to be repurposed as a school, though within a year it needed to be replaced.

Beck Street School was built in 1884. It was designed by David Riebel, who was hired as the first Columbus Public Schools architect in 1893. The building was one of a few, including Avondale Elementary, designed by Riebel before he became the lead architect for Columbus City Schools.

The building closed in 2017. It was listed as one of the city's most endangered sites, in a 2019 list compiled by Columbus Landmarks. The building was vacant, with an unclear future and a valuable property for developers. In 2020, the Columbus Board of Education approved the sale of the building, allowing its use for charter schools, and then potentially for auction. The South Columbus Preparatory Academy opened in the building soon afterward.

== See also ==
- National Register of Historic Places listings in Columbus, Ohio
- Schools in Columbus, Ohio
