= Municipal Light Plant =

United States historic building in Columbus, Ohio

- U.S. National Register of Historic Places
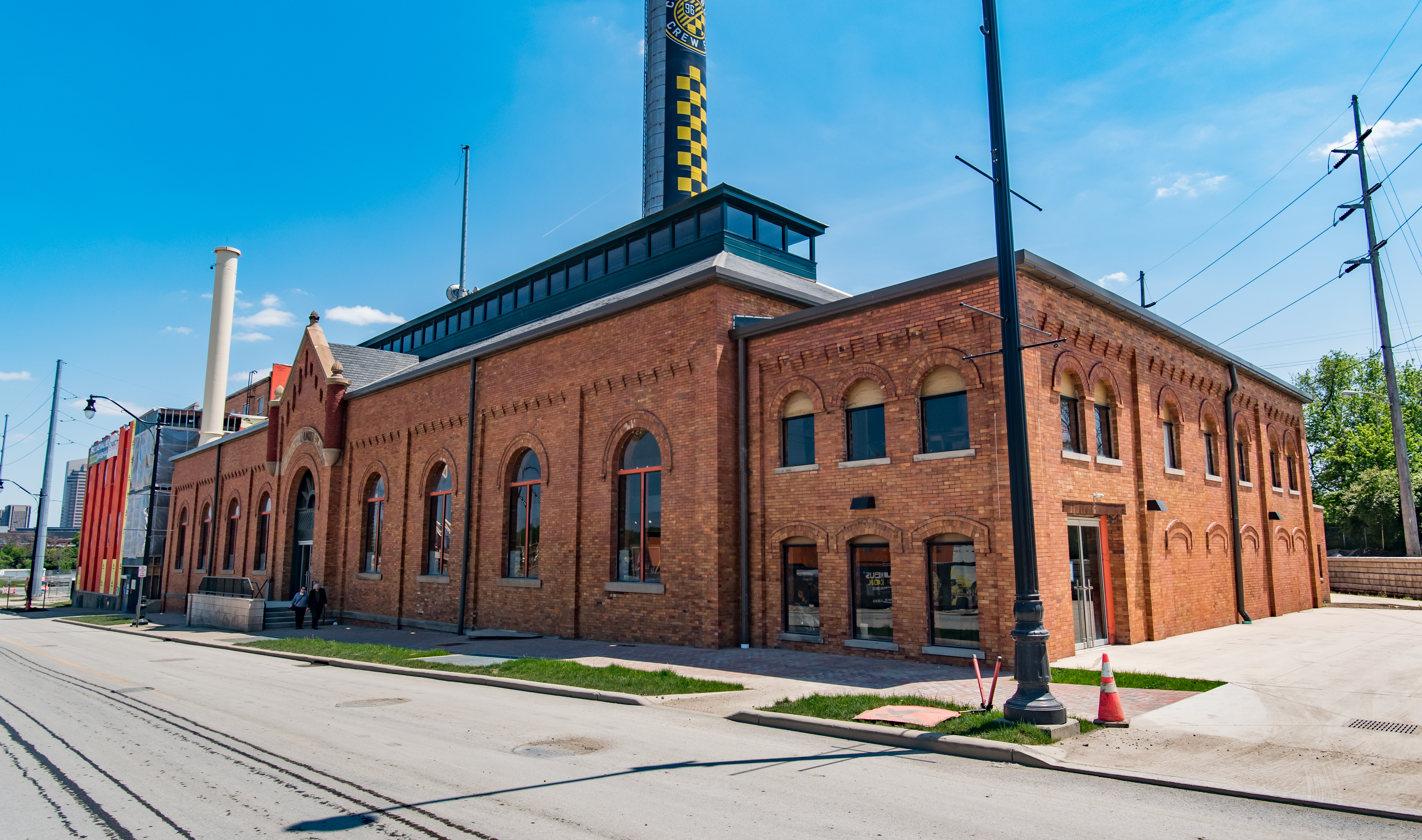
- Interactive map highlighting the building's location
- Location: 555 W. Nationwide Boulevard, Columbus, Ohio
- Coordinates: 39.96691°N 83.01832°W
- Built: 1903-1904
- Architectural style: 19th-century Victorian, mid-19th century Utilitarian/Art Deco
- NRHP reference No.: 15000902
- Added to NRHP: December 15, 2015

The Municipal Light Plant is a historic building in the Arena District of Downtown Columbus, Ohio. It was listed on the National Register of Historic Places in 2015. The structure includes an early 20th century Romanesque Revival building and a mid-20th century Art Deco addition.

In 2022, the Municipal Light Plant won the Columbus Landmarks' James B. Recchie Design Award.

== See also ==
- List of Art Deco architecture in the United States
- National Register of Historic Places listings in Columbus, Ohio
