= Thurber House =

Historic house in Ohio, United States

- James Thurber House
- U.S. National Register of Historic Places
- U.S. Historic district – Contributing property
- Columbus Register of Historic Properties
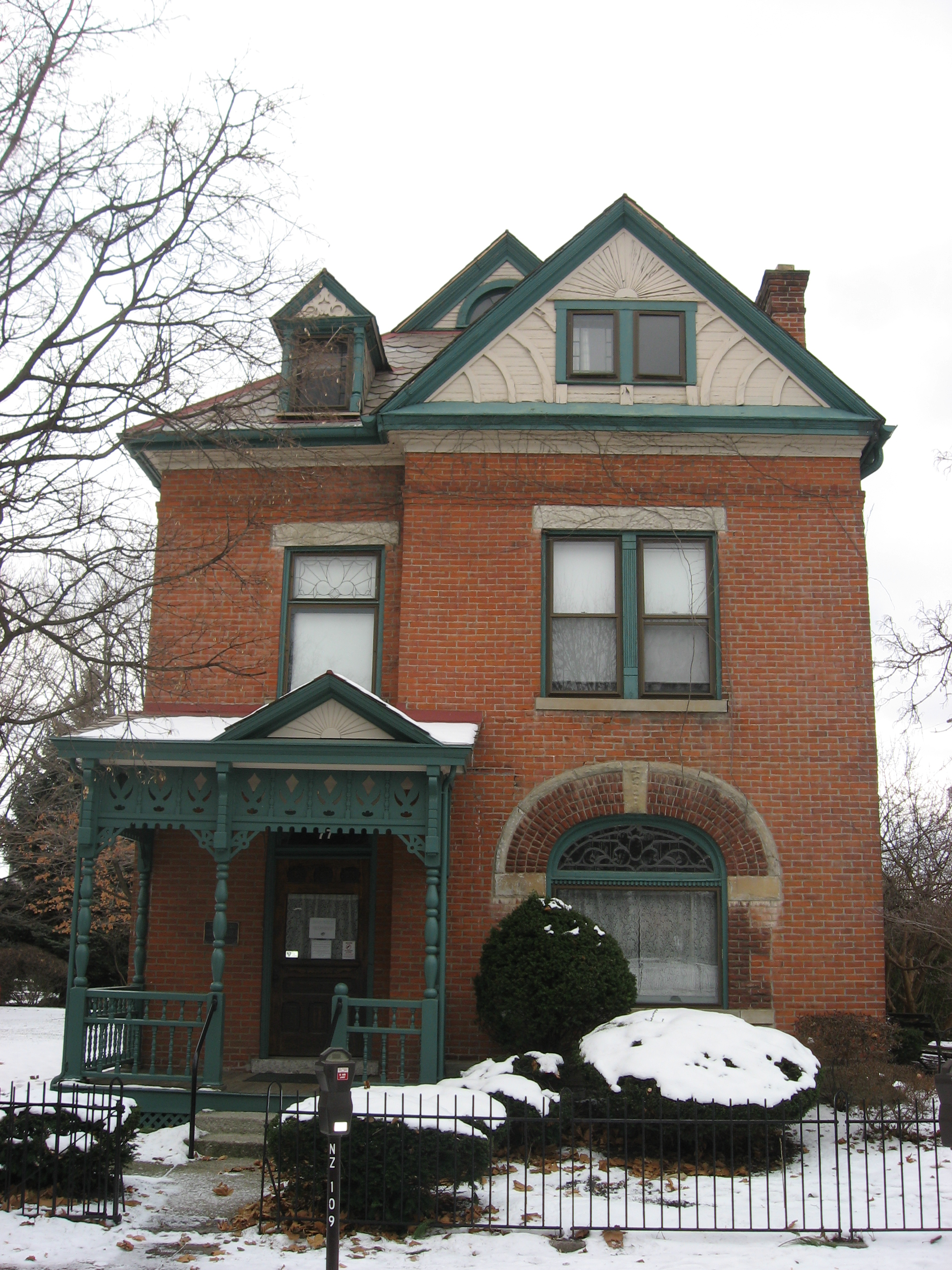
- Front of the house
- Interactive map highlighting the building's location
- Location: 77 Jefferson Ave., Columbus, Ohio
- Coordinates: 39.965781°N 82.985215°W
- Built: 1873
- Part of: Jefferson Avenue Historic District
- NRHP reference No.: 79001840
- CRHP No.: CR-14

Significant dates
- Added to NRHP: November 8, 1979
- Designated CRHP: January 10, 1983

Thurber House is a literary center for readers and writers located in Columbus, Ohio, in the historic former home of author, humorist, and New Yorker cartoonist James Thurber. Thurber House is dedicated to promoting the literary arts by presenting quality literary programming; increasing the awareness of literature as a significant art form; promoting excellence in writing; providing support for literary artists; and commemorating Thurber's literary and artistic achievements. The house is individually listed on the National Register of Historic Places, and also as part of the Jefferson Avenue Historic District.

== History ==
James Thurber was born in Columbus at a different home. Thurber's family rented this home on Jefferson Avenue while he was a student at The Ohio State University. He and his family lived there until 1917. Thurber later wrote of his experience here in My Life and Hard Times. Thurber claimed to have experienced a ghost in the house on November 17, 1915, and the incident inspired his short story "The Night the Ghost Got In". Writer William O'Rourke, who lived at the house in 1984, wrote his own version titled "The Night the Ghost Didn't Get In", published in Poets & Writers Magazine in 1988. Thurber's short story “The Night the Bed Fell” was also inspired by events in the house.

Thurber's time in the house was challenging, particularly because of his experience at the university. Due to his physical limitations, including bad eyesight, he performed poorly at required gym classes and military drills. He was not invited to join a fraternity and, as such, found few social connections. Though he registered for classes in his sophomore year, 1914–1915, he mostly stopped going to classes and failed them all. Eventually, he befriended former child star Elliott Nugent, who helped Thurber become more outgoing. He eventually became co-editor of the campus newspaper and contributed to the humor magazine before becoming its editor.

Thurber left school in 1918 amidst World War I. For a few years he worked for The Columbus Dispatch before moving to New York. In 1927, he began his association with The New Yorker and contributed to that magazine for the rest of his career. Though he ultimately spent relatively little time in Columbus, Thurber's experience there influenced his writings. As he once noted, "Many of my books prove that I am never far away from Ohio in my thoughts, and that the clocks that strike in my dreams are often the clocks of Columbus."

== Museum ==
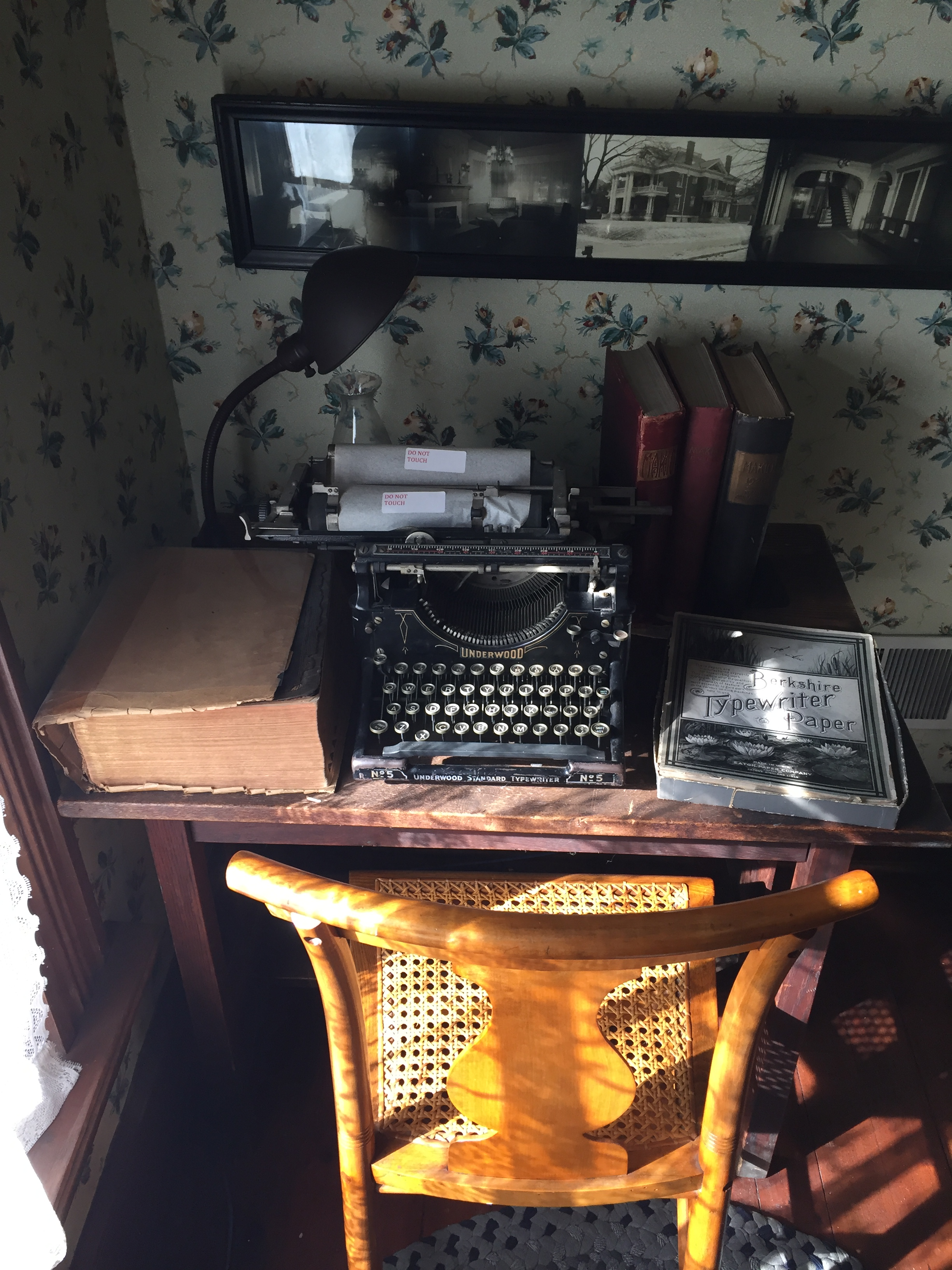
The museum displays original items owned by Thurber, including this Underwood typewriter.

Thurber House opened to the public as a historic house museum in 1984 after extensive renovation to the historic house. Furnishings have been restored to the period when the Thurber family lived there from 1913 to 1917. Visitors can view the first two floors, which contain a formal parlor, living room, dining room, five bedrooms, and a bathroom. Guests are also allowed to interact with many museum materials, such as sitting on chairs or playing the piano. The parents' bedroom features rotating displays of Thurber memorabilia, including a display of Thurber's drawings that became New Yorker covers.

Thurber House is part of The Jefferson Center for Learning and the Arts, a one-block stretch of Queen Anne Style Victorian homes that house cultural and social service nonprofit organizations.

== Events ==
Since its opening as a museum, Thurber House has become a gathering place for readers, writers, and Thurber enthusiasts of all ages. Its programs for both children and adults include author readings, writing classes, and celebrations of Thurber's life.

Through its "Evenings with Authors," a series of readings and receptions with nationally known authors, Thurber House has attracted well-known writers such as John Updike, T.C. Boyle, Tracy Chevalier, and Scott Turow. The Thurber House also hosts two writers in residence each year through the John E. Nance Writer-in-Residence Program and the Children's Writer in Residence Program. The Writer in Residence lives on the top floor of the Thurber House for four weeks. The Children's Writer-in-Residence also teaches ten hours a week for the Thurber House Summer Writing Camp.

The annual Thurber Prize for American Humor has become the nation's highest designation of the art of humor writing. Its children's programs, including the popular Thurber Summer Writing Camp, and the winter program Writing Wizards have nurtured thousands of young writers.
