= Jefferson Avenue Historic District (Columbus, Ohio) =

Historic district in Ohio, United States

- U.S. National Register of Historic Places
- U.S. Historic district
- Columbus Register of Historic Properties
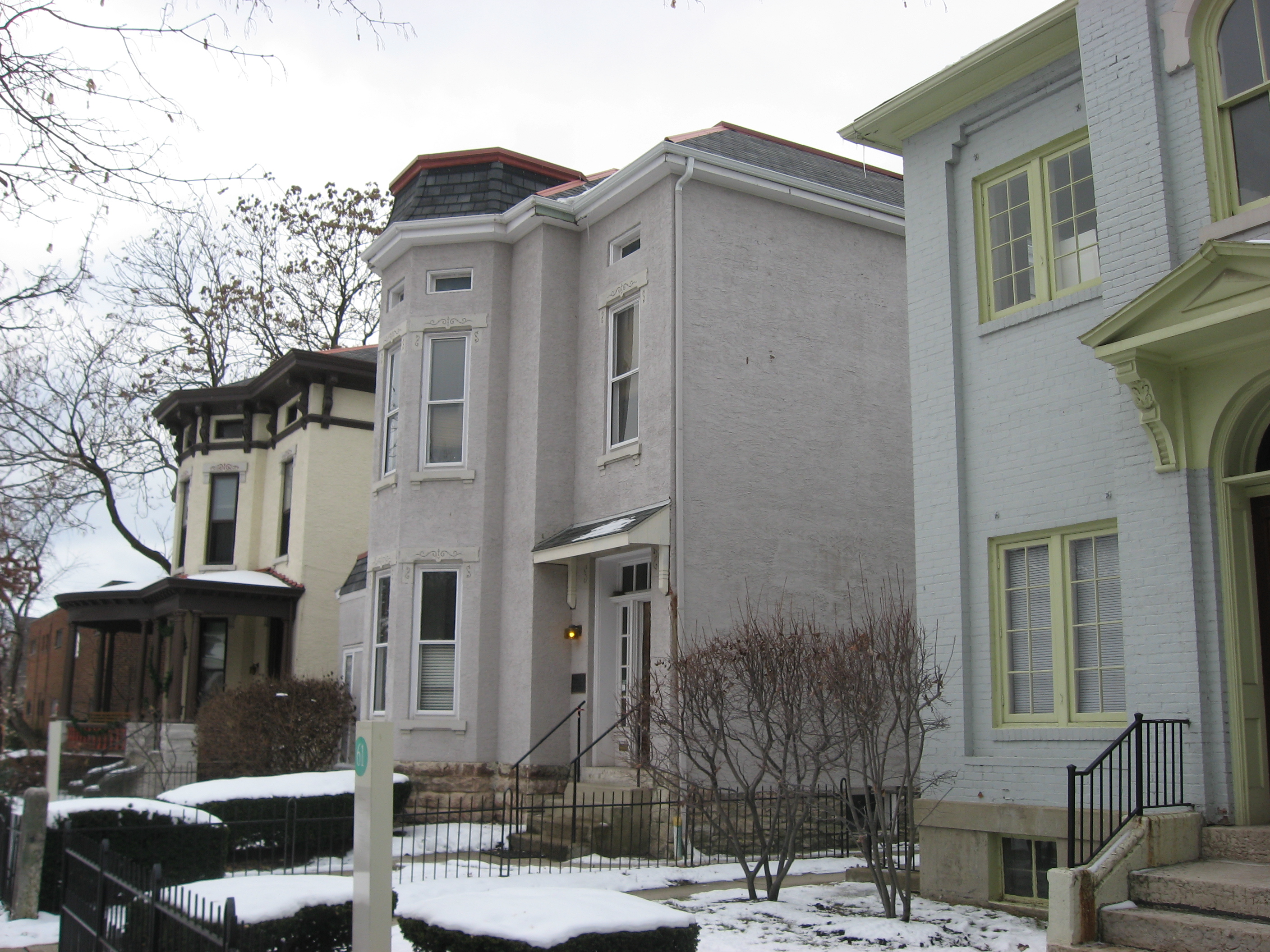
- Contributing buildings
- Interactive map highlighting the district among other historic sites and districts
- Location: Columbus, Ohio
- Coordinates: 39.96551°N 82.98468°W
- NRHP reference No.: 82001459
- CRHP No.: CR-23

Significant dates
- Added to NRHP: December 2, 1982
- Designated CRHP: December 12, 1983

The Jefferson Avenue Historic District is a historic district in Downtown Columbus, Ohio. The site was listed on the National Register of Historic Places in 1982 and the Columbus Register of Historic Properties in 1983. The site includes approximately 12 buildings regarded for their history and architecture. It is one of few remaining residential neighborhoods downtown. It includes the Thurber House, formerly home to cartoonist and author James Thurber, and the headquarters building of the Columbus Landmarks Foundation. The boundaries of the district vary slightly between the two registers the district was entered in.

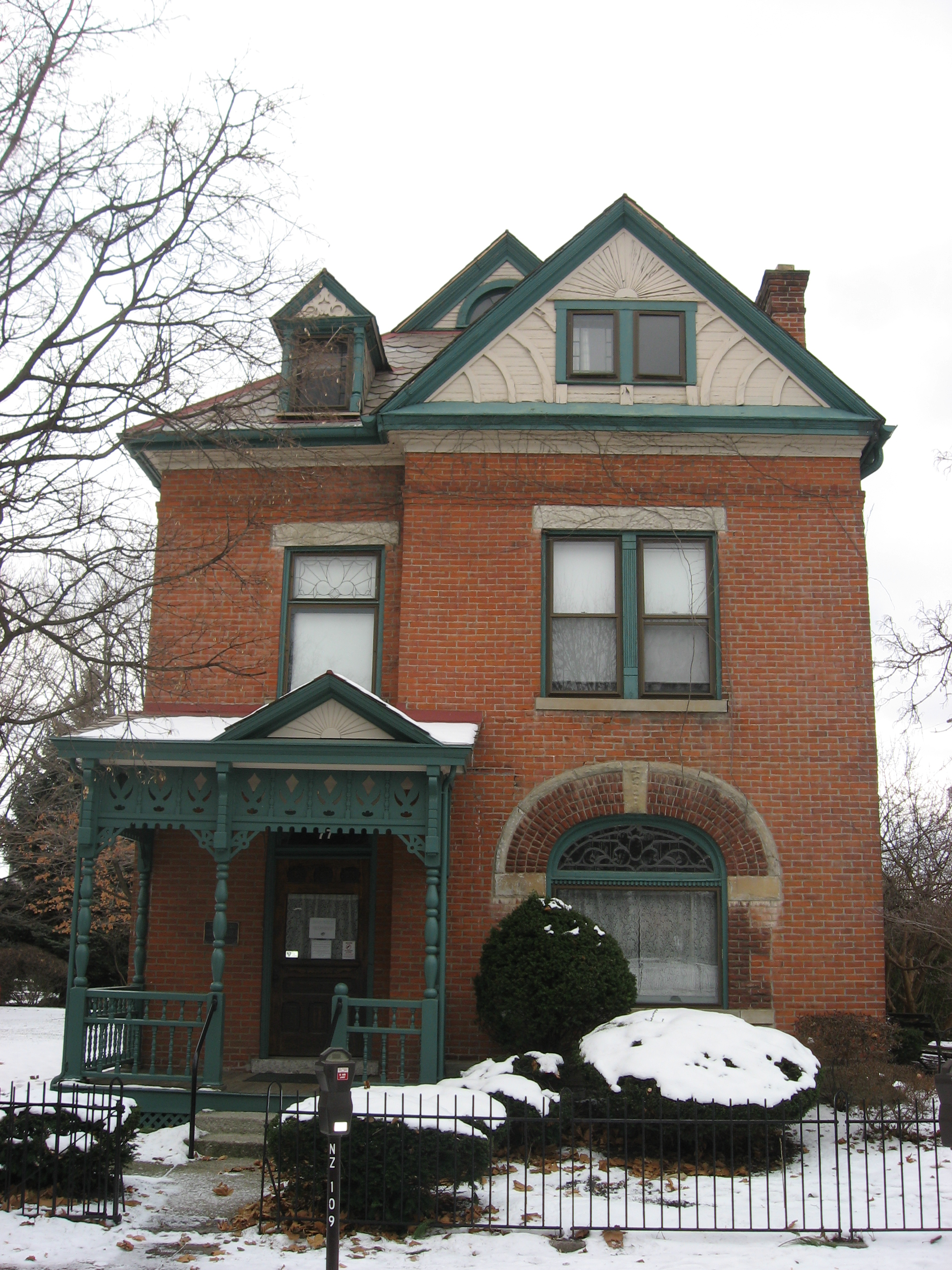
The Thurber House, also individually listed

== See also ==
- National Register of Historic Places listings in Columbus, Ohio
