= Saint Leo Oratory (Columbus, Ohio) =

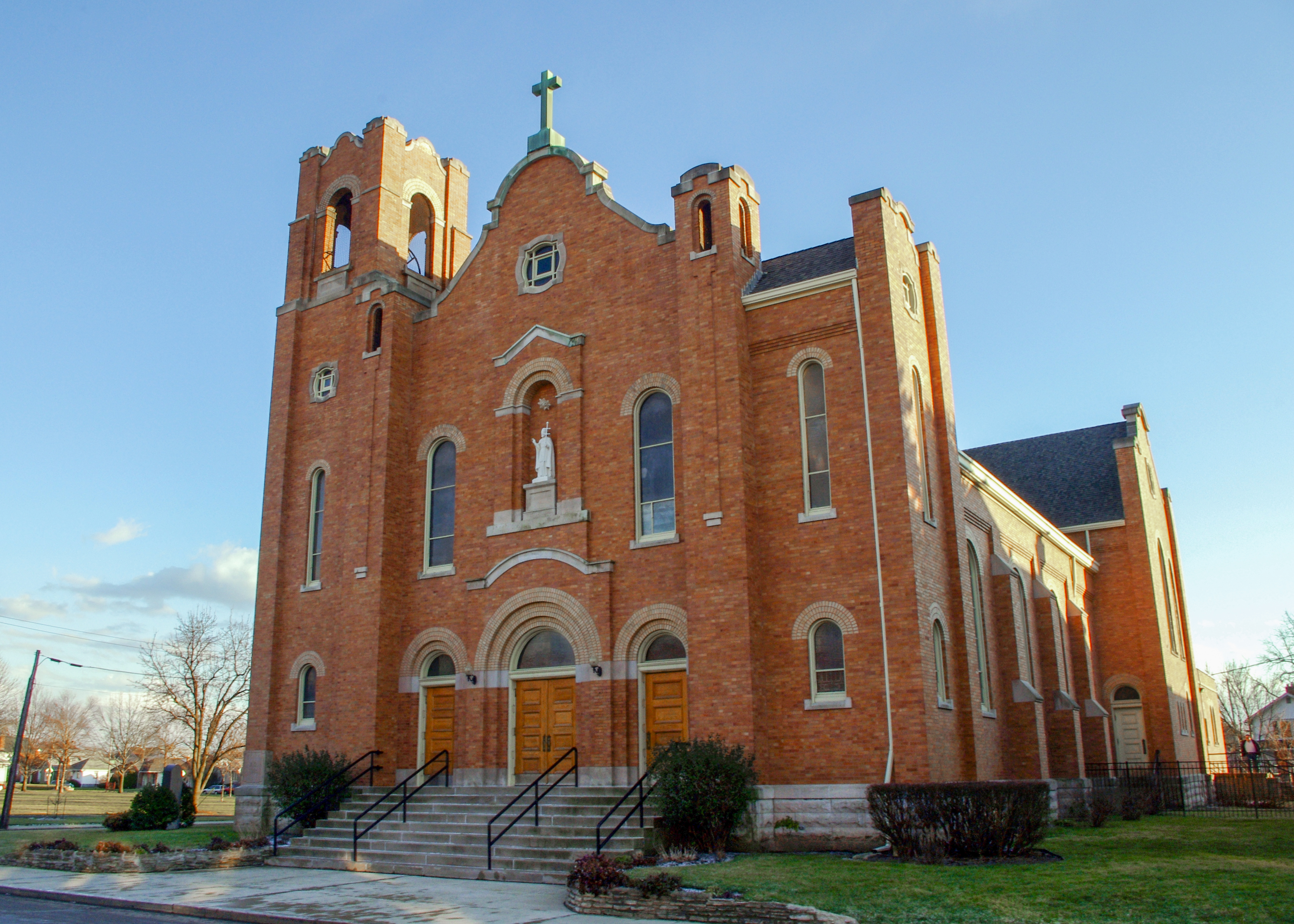
- Saint Leo Oratory
- 39.936243°N 82.989067°W
- Location: 221 Hanford Street, Columbus, Ohio
- Denomination: Catholic Church
- Tradition: Traditional Catholicism
- Religious institute: Institute of Christ the King
- Website: institute-christ-king.org/columbus-home

History
- Dedicated: May 16, 1917

Architecture
- Architect: William P. Ginther
- Architectural type: Romanesque
- Groundbreaking: May 26, 1903

Specifications
- Capacity: 812
- Length: 136 feet
- Width: 60 feet

Administration
- Diocese: Diocese of Columbus

Clergy
- Bishop: Earl Fernandes
- Rector: Canon David Silvey

Saint Leo Oratory is a historic Catholic church and active oratory operated by the Institute of Christ the King in the Diocese of Columbus, located in the Merion Village neighborhood of Columbus, Ohio. The historic parish was founded in 1903, the current Romanesque Revival church building was finished in 1917, the parish was suppressed in 1999, and the current ICKSP oratory was founded in 2020.

== History ==
=== Founding ===
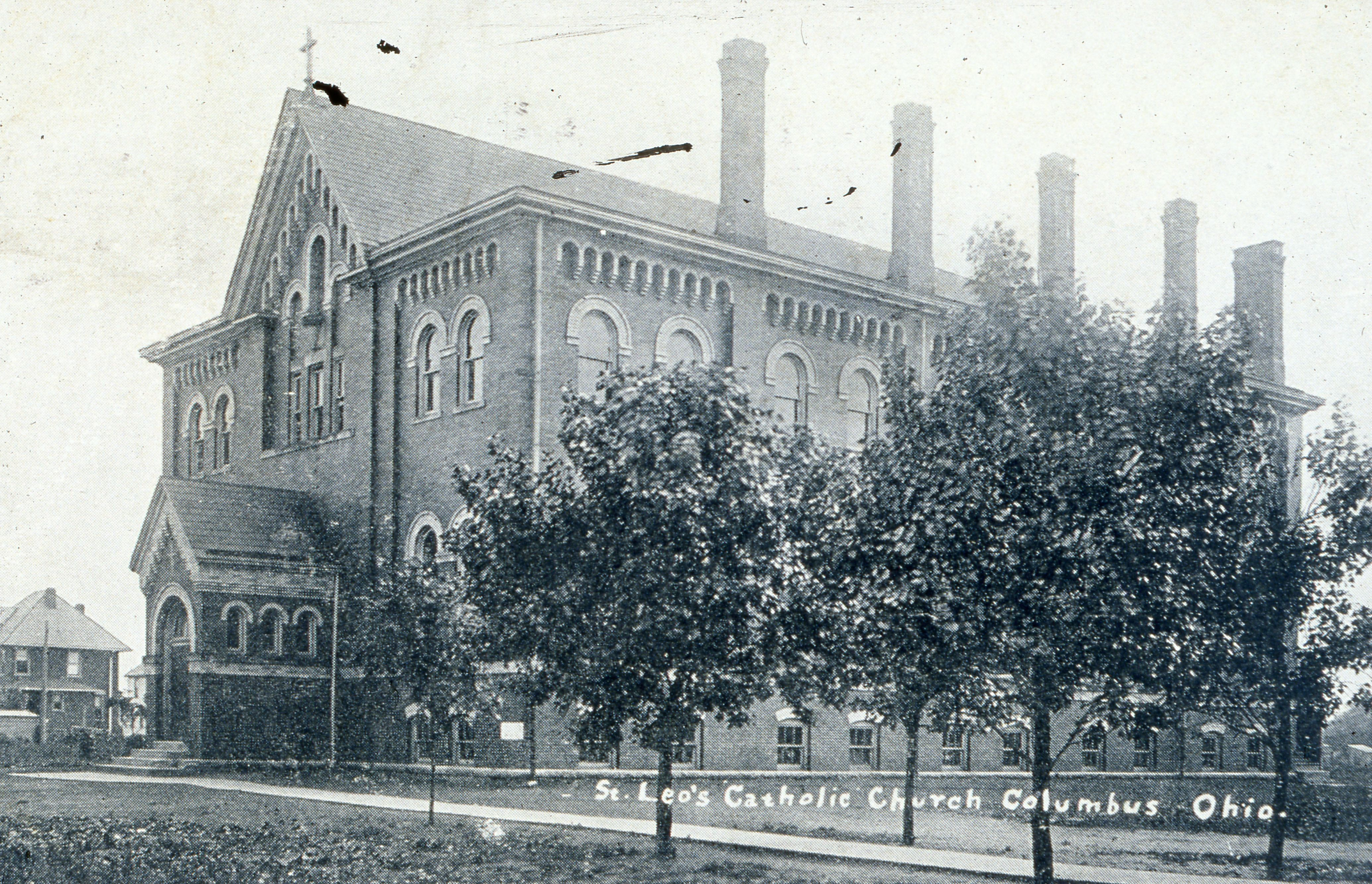
The original combined church and school building, completed in 1903, which was demolished in 2001.

Because of the rising Catholic population in the South End in the early 1900s, Bishop Henry K. Moeller called upon Father Charles Kessler, then the assistant pastor of St. Joseph Cathedral to organize a new parish from the territory of St. Mary Church under the patronage of St. Leo the Great. In November 1903, a tract of land was purchased at the corner of Hanford and Seventh Street from Henry Noltemeyer, and a combination school and chapel was built there, the former being staffed by the Sisters of St. Francis and being the first free parochial school in the state of Ohio. The sisters continued to staff the school until its closure. The parish was declared debt-free in 1910, and the current church building, designed by William P. Ginther, was dedicated by bishop James Hartley on May 16, 1917. After the completion of the new church, the chapel in the first floor of the school was converted into classrooms.

=== Decline and Preservation ===
In 1972, the parish school, which previously had been free, began charging tuition due to declining contributions and increasing costs. Because a decline in parish support, volunteer efforts, and financial resources, the school closed in 1997 and its buildings, including the original parish building dating to 1903 were demolished in October 2001.

Citing priest shortages and declining parish membership, James Anthony Griffin suppressed the parish and merged it back into neighboring Saint Mary on July 1, 1999. However, congregants and the greater community banded together to form the St. Leo Preservation Society to keep the church from being demolished. The group appealed the decision to the Apostolic Signatura, which upheld the decision of the Diocese.

The church saw occasional use for weddings and funerals, as well as for Masses for Korean Catholics in the Diocese from 2009 to 2020. It also served as a worship location for parishioners of St. Mary during its 2019 restoration. A volunteer caretaker, Mike Wolfe, restored much of the interior of the church and repaired the 2,700-pipe Tellers-Kent organ in the church, dating to 1927, and the Diocese paid for a new roof in 2004 to protect his work.

=== Institute of Christ the King ===
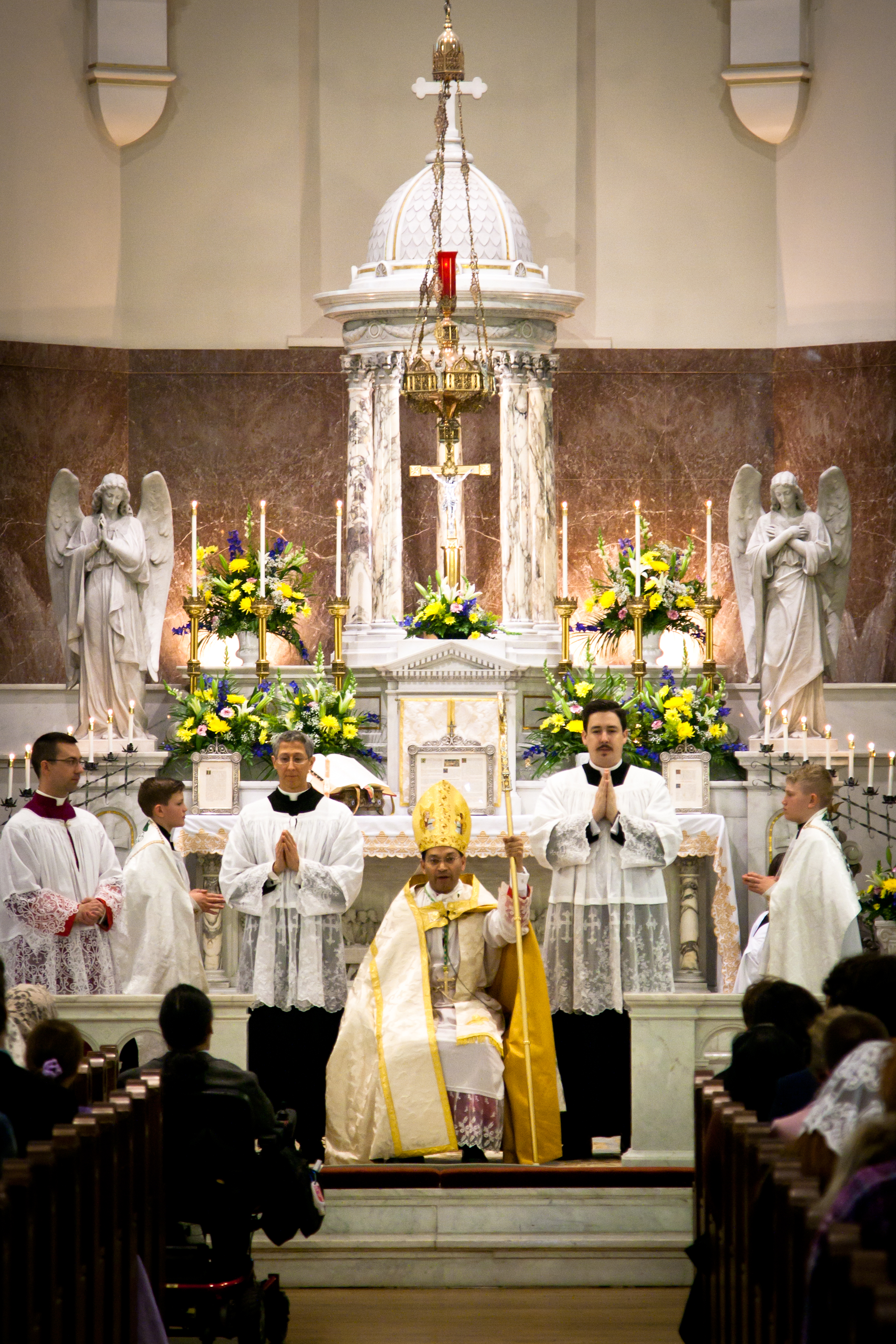
Bishop Fernandes preaches a homily during Solemn High Mass with Pontifical Assistance from the Throne at St. Leo Oratory

On the 16th of September 2020, the Institute of Christ the King Sovereign Priest, a traditional Catholic order of secular canons announced that it would establish an oratory at the church and celebrate Mass there according to the Tridentine Missal. The opening Mass was said on October 2, 2020, with Bishop Robert Brennan preaching the homily and heralding the opening of the Oratory as a 'great day' for the diocese.

Brennan's successor, Earl Fernandes, visited the Oratory for the first time in February of 2023, offering Pontifical Assistance from the Throne for the feast of Candlemas.

== Architecture and buildings ==
The church is built in the Romanesque style out of buff brick. The floor of the main sanctuary is of Italian marble, as are the high altar and baldachin. Major repairs to all portions of the church commenced following the closure of the parish. The altar rail, portions of which had been used to build a new versus populum altar in 1976, was restored and re-installed in November 2021. The rectory attached to the church is also in the process of being renovated to provide housing for the canons and oblates staffing the parish.
