= William O'Rourke (writer) =

American novelist

- Born: December 4, 1945 (age 80); Chicago
- Education: University of Missouri-Kansas City
- Writing career
- Genres: Fiction, Nonfiction, memoir, journalism
- Notable works: The Harrisburg 7 and the New Catholic Left (1972), Idle Hands (1981), Criminal Tendencies (1987), Campaign America '96: The View From the Couch (1997)

William O'Rourke (born December 4, 1945) is an American writer of both novels and volumes of nonfiction; he is the author of the novels The Meekness of Isaac (Thomas Y. Crowell, Co., 1974), Idle Hands (Delacorte Press, 1981), Criminal Tendencies (E. P. Dutton, 1987), and Notts (Marlowe & Co, 1996), as well as the nonfiction books, The Harrisburg 7 and the New Catholic Left (Thomas Y. Crowell, Co., 1972), Signs of the Literary Times: Essays, Reviews, Profiles (SUNY Press, 1993), and On Having a Heart Attack: A Medical Memoir (U of Notre Dame P, 2006). He is the editor of On the Job: Fiction About Work by Contemporary American Writers (Random House, 1977) and the co-editor of Notre Dame Review: The First Ten Years (U of Notre Dame P, 2009). His book, Campaign America '96: The View From the Couch, first published in 1997 (Marlowe & Co.), was reissued in paperback with a new, updated epilogue in 2000. A sequel, Campaign America 2000: The View From the Couch, was published in 2001 (PreviewPort Editions).

He has been awarded two National Endowment for the Arts fellowships (for the novels Idle Hands and Criminal Tendencies) and he was the first James Thurber Writer-in-Residence in 1984 at the Thurber House in Columbus, Ohio, and was awarded a New York State Council on the Arts award for his first novel, The Meekness of Isaac. On Having a Heart Attack was awarded a bronze medal in ForeWord Magazine's 2006 Book of the Year Awards, Health category.

Born in Chicago and raised in Kansas City, Mo., he attended University of Missouri–Kansas City, graduating in 1968 and completed an M.F.A. at Columbia University in 1970. His first book, The Harrisburg 7 and the New Catholic Left (1972), covered the trial of the a group of religious anti-war activists, known as the "Harrisburg Seven," and his account was heralded by Garry Wills in the New York Times Book Review as "the best volume on any of the recent political trials" and "a clinical X ray of our society's condition." He followed up his court reporting with his first novel, The Meekness of Isaac (1974), while working as a laborer at Feller's Scenery Studio in the South Bronx. He then moved to teaching at various universities.

O'Rourke taught journalism at Newark State College (now Kean University) from 1973 to 1974, before moving to Rutgers–Newark (journalism and creative writing) and then Mount Holyoke College (creative writing) in South Hadley, MA. In 1981, he joined the English department at the University of Notre Dame, where he was the founding director of its graduate creative writing program in 1990-91 and continues as professor and the editor of its national literary journal, the Notre Dame Review.

He wrote a weekly political column for the Chicago Sun-Times from 2001 till 2005, as well as, over the years, short nonfiction and criticism for The Nation, The New York Times, Commonweal, the Chicago Tribune, and other periodicals.

== Published books ==
Fiction

- The Meekness of Isaac (1974)
- Idle Hands (1981)
- Criminal Tendencies (1987)
- Notts (1996)

Nonfiction

- The Harrisburg 7 and the New Catholic Left (1972)
- Signs of the Literary Times: Essays, Reviews, Profiles 1970-1992 (1993)
- Campaign America '96: The View From the Couch (1997)
- Campaign America 2000: The View From the Couch (2001)
- On Having a Heart Attack: A Medical Memoir (2006)
- Confessions of a Guilty Freelancer (2012)

Edited works

- On the Job: Fiction About Work by Contemporary American Writers (1977)
- Notre Dame Review: The First Ten Years (2009)
