= Saint Mary, Mother of God Church (Columbus, Ohio) =

Historic church in Ohio, United States

- St. Mary Church or Grand Old St. Mary's
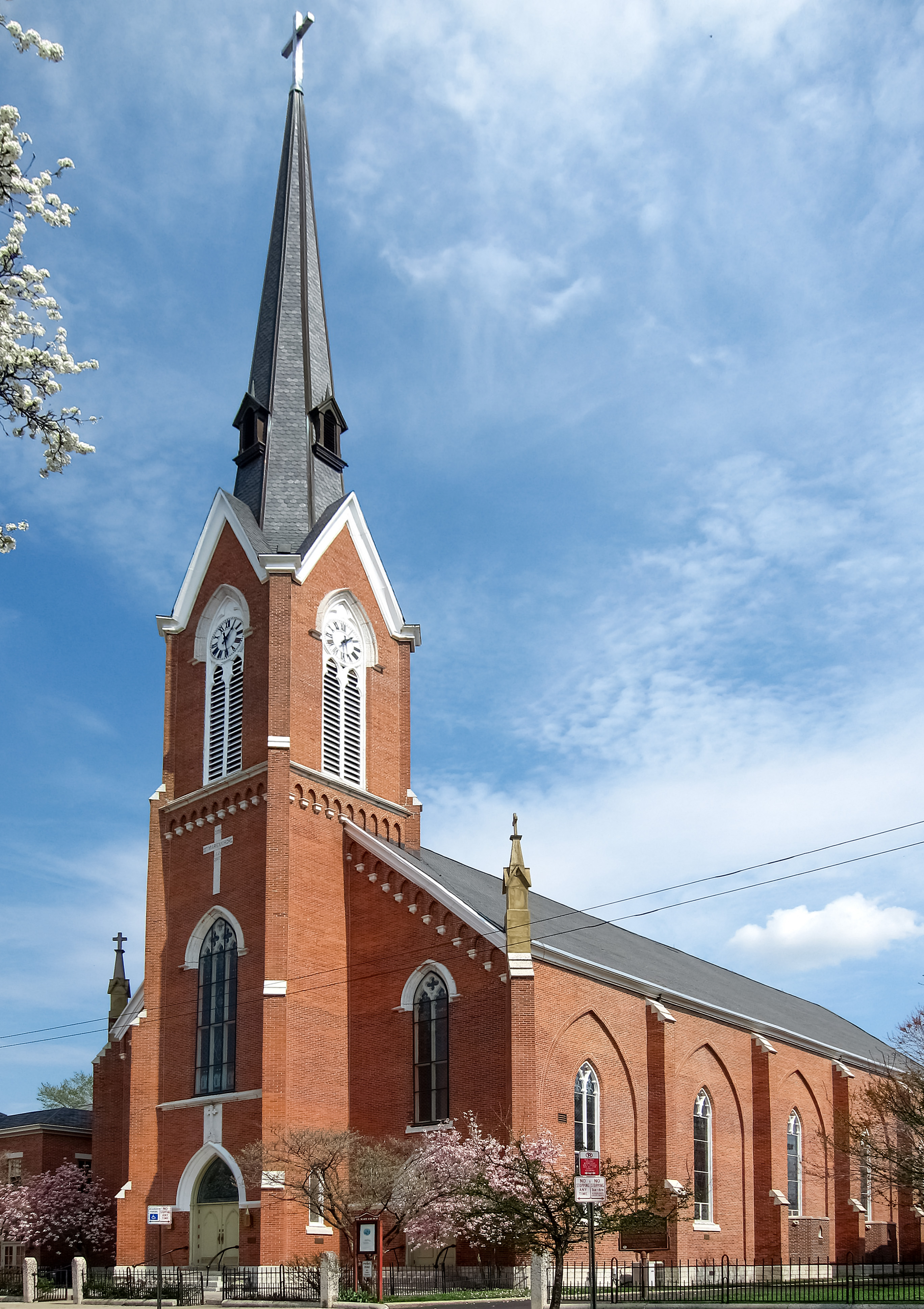
- Saint Mary Church in the springtime
- Saint Mary, Mother of God Church
- Location: 684 South 3rd Street in Columbus, Ohio
- Country: United States
- Denomination: Roman Catholic
- Website: www.stmarychurchgv.org

Architecture
- Heritage designation: U.S. National Register of Historic Places
- Designated: December 30, 1974
- Architect(s): Blackburn and Koehler
- Style: Gothic revival
- Groundbreaking: 1866
- Completed: 1893
- Construction cost: $40,000

Specifications
- Length: 140 feet (43 m)
- Width: 62.5 feet (19 m)
- Height: 75 feet (23 m)
- Materials: Brick

Administration
- Diocese: Roman Catholic Diocese of Columbus
- Saint Mary of the Assumption Catholic Church
- U.S. Historic district – Contributing property
- Location: Columbus, Ohio
- Coordinates: 39°56′55.4″N 82°59′41.2″W
- Part of: German Village (ID74001490)
- Designated CP: December 30, 1974

Saint Mary, Mother of God Church (commonly known as St. Mary Church, Grand Old St. Mary's, or St. Mary, Mother of God) is the third oldest Catholic church building in Columbus, Ohio and is home to an active parish in the Roman Catholic Diocese of Columbus. With the rest of German Village, it was added to the National Register of Historic Places on December 30, 1974.

== History ==
=== Early history and construction ===
In the year 1865, approximately one third of the Columbus population was ethnically German due to decades of immigration. Many German immigrants settled in the South End neighborhood (as German Village was then called). The Catholic population had outgrown nearby Holy Cross Church and the German-speaking South End residents wanted their own parish. It was in that same year, St. Mary's parish was formed with the newly ordained Fr. Francis X. Sprecht as its first pastor. Construction began in 1866 and the church was dedicated two years later by Bishop Sylvester Rosecrans on November 29, 1868. The spire was erected in 1893 at a price of $5,000 (equivalent to $179,167 in 2025.) The clock was installed the next year.

The church's name refers to the ancient Christian belief that as the mother of Jesus Christ, Mary was the Mother of God. The church spire towers 197 feet (60 m) above street level making it a prominent landmark and the tallest building in the historic German Village neighborhood south of downtown Columbus.

=== 150th anniversary ===
On August 14, 2015, the church undertook a motorcade featuring a mobile carillon as part of the celebration for the parish's 150th anniversary and its 90th Homecoming Festival. The motorcade reenacted the November 1868 procession which preceded the church's dedication.

=== Closure and restoration ===
On Sunday, August 28, 2016, lightning struck the church building. On Friday, October 7, 2016 structural engineers recommended St. Mary Church temporarily condemned due to significant damage to the roof trusses, exterior brick, and ceiling. While under repairs, Masses were held in the St. Mary School gymnasium, with special Masses held at Saint Leo Church in Merion Village.

The parish used the closure as an opportunity to renovate and restore nearly the entire church. The parish funded the project via a $7.5 million capital campaign with support from Columbus community leaders. and general contractor Corna Kokosing executed the project, which according to Fr. Kevin Lutz, “…encompassed the roof, the foundations, wall supports, choir supports, new front stairs, a prayer garden, a new sidewalk, rewiring the entire church, new heating, ventilating and air conditioning system, a new church and sanctuary floor, repainting the statues, and restoration of the confessionals, baptistery and Pietà shrine… For financial reasons, the original plan also did not include work on our stained-glass windows. But when they were looked at more closely, we realized they had to come out for re-leading. These are the kind of previously unknown issues that add layers to the original task.” David B. Meleca Architects, EverGreene Architectural Arts, and Martin Painting and Coating jointly restored the painted ceiling with digitally printed canvasses. Matthew Indrutz of Muralworks painted additional interior decoration.

The church reopened for worship on April 19, 2019, for the Palm Sunday Vigil Mass. Following these renovations, the church was chosen as the best religious wedding venue in the city of Columbus by the readers of Columbus Monthly in 2022. It also served as a performance venue for Central Ohio chamber orchestra ProMusica Columbus.

=== Absorption of St. Ladislas and Corpus Christi Parishes ===
Citing "demographic changes... a decline in the number of registered parishioners, a decline in Mass attendance, decline in offertory revenue, and the shortage of priests...", bishop Earl Fernandes suppressed the neighboring parishes of St. Ladislas and Corpus Christi and merged their territory with that of St. Mary's on April 5, 2023.

== Interior ==
=== Chancel ===
The white walnut reredos behind the main altar is 20 feet wide and 45 feet tall. Carved by Allard Klooter in 1866 at a cost of $2,500, it was moved to St. Mary Church from another church in Cincinnati. As the church patroness, a statue of the Blessed Virgin Mary stands in the center of the reredos. It is flanked on the left by a statue of Saint Catherine of Alexandria, and on the right by Saint Boniface. All of these statues are made of carved wood.

The crucifix hanging from the dome of the apse is 10 feet wide and 12 feet long, with a symbol representing one of the four Gospels at each extremity. Created by a parishioner, it was first hung in the church during the early 1930s.

=== Stained glass windows ===
The original stained glass windows in the church building were composed of religious symbols and geometric designs. Some of these can still be found in stairways, the choir loft, the sacristy, and in the vestibule. The original windows along the north and south walls of the nave have been replaced with windows depicting saints and the life of Jesus Christ.

Subjects of the pictorial stained glass windows as arranged from east to west
North Side	South Side
Saint Dominic receiving the Rosary from the Virgin Mary	Sacred Heart of Jesus appearing to St. Margaret Mary
The Annunciation	The Marriage of the Virgin
The Holy Family serenaded by a cherub	Christ and Saint John the Baptist as children
Saint Thérèse of Lisieux	The Immaculate Conception

=== Paintings ===
Ten painted ceiling panels depict images representing titles of Mary from the Litany of Loreto. The ceiling was originally painted in the 1890s and restored in 1987. Munich native, Gerhart Lemars, executed the sanctuary paintings between 1930 and 1935. The apse ceiling depicts a Trinitarian rendering of the Eye of Providence. Oval symbols running vertically near the face of the apse represent salvation. Angels holding instruments of the Passion of Christ stand over a Latin phrase taken from the Adoration of the Cross portion of the Roman Catholic Good Friday liturgy. Translated, it says, “Behold the wood of the cross on which hung the salvation of the world… Faithful cross, most noble tree of all.”

Oil frescos are located over the side altars flanking the sanctuary. Painted by Wenceslaus Thein and William Lamprecht in 1867, the left painting shows the Adoration of the Magi, and the right painting shows the Holy Family with Saint Anne.

Subjects of the Marian ceiling images as arranged from east to west (German language : English language)
North Side	South Side
Thurm Davids/Bitte fϋr uns : Tower of David/Pray for us	Elfenbeinerner Thurm/Bitte fϋr uns : Tower of Ivory/Pray for us
Geistliche Rose/Bitte fϋr uns : Mystical Rose/Pray for us	Goldenes Haϋs/Bitte fϋr uns : House of Gold/Pray for us
Ehrwurdiges Gefass/Bitte fϋr uns : Vessel of Honor/Pray for us	Arche des Bundes/Bitte fϋr uns : Ark of the Covenant/Pray for us
Sitz der Weisheit/Bitte fϋr uns : Seat of Wisdom/Pray for us	Himmelspforte/Bitte fϋr uns : Gate of Heaven/Pray for us
Spiegel der Gerechtigkeit/Bitte fϋr uns : Mirror of Justice/Pray for us	Morgenstern/Bitte fϋr uns : Morningstar/Pray for us

== St. Mary School ==
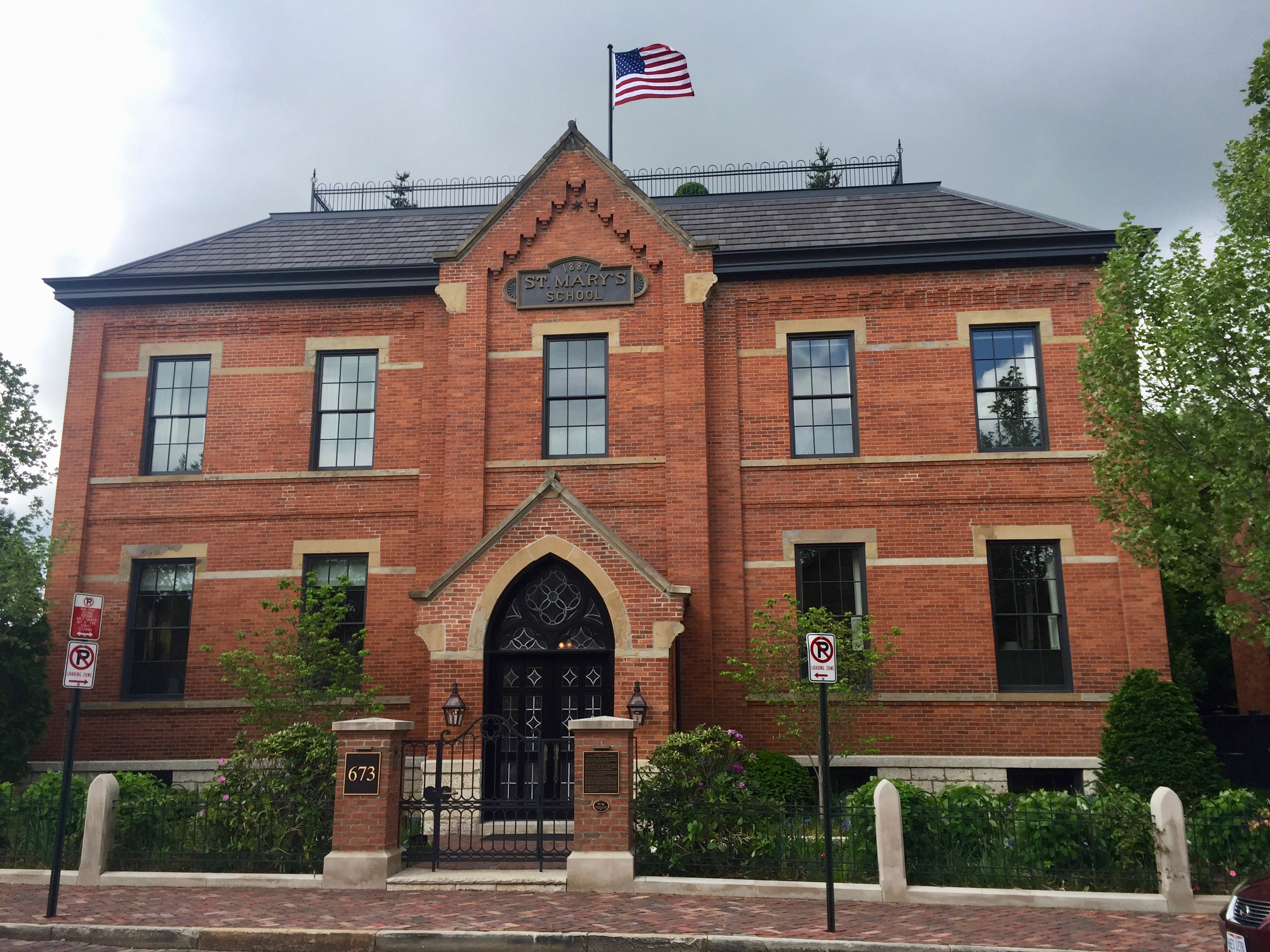
St. Mary's School of 1887, now a private house

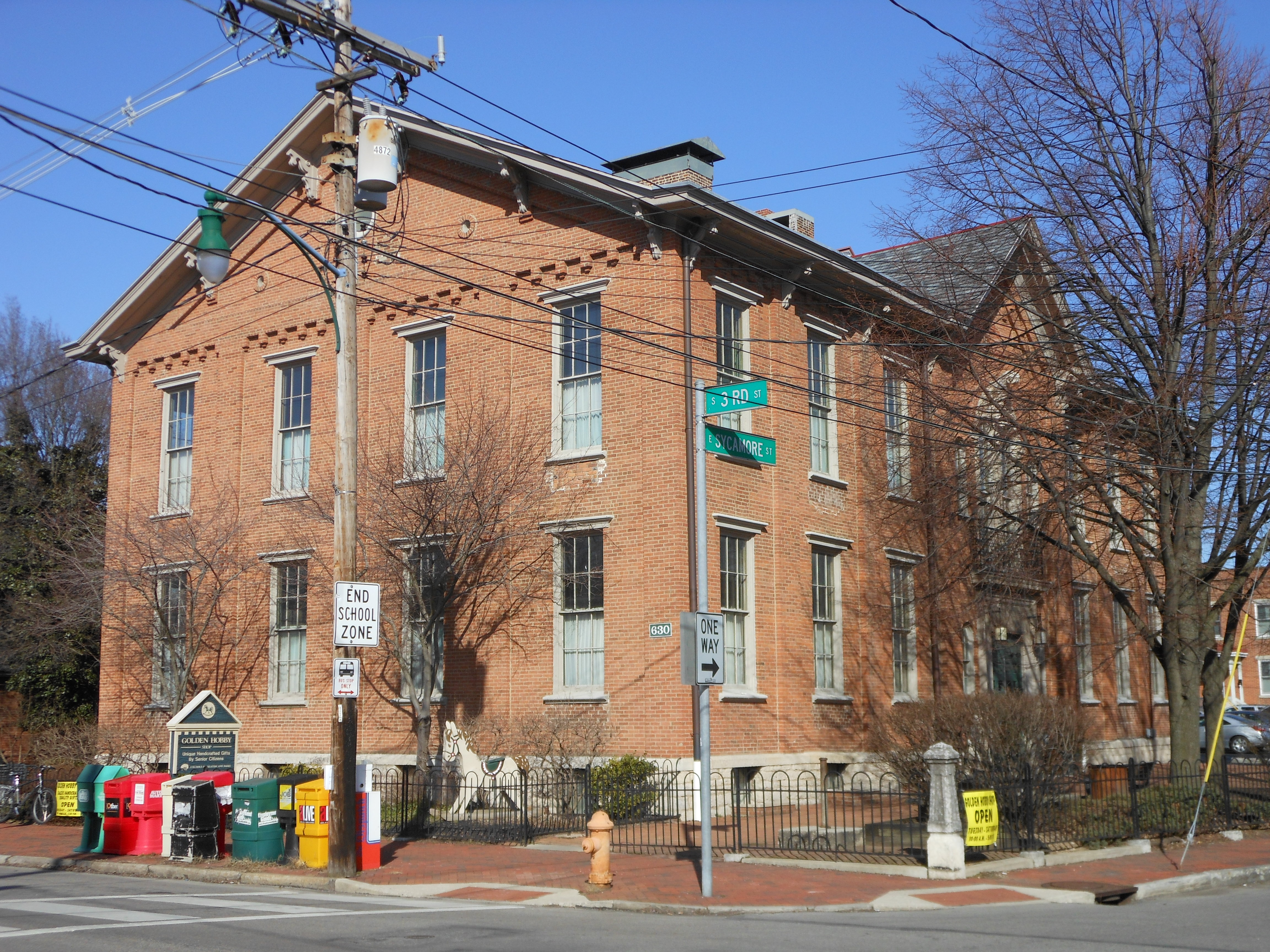
The former Third Street School (1868), now part of the St. Mary School

A school for the growing parish was founded in 1865, initially staffed by lay persons, but then taken over by Sisters of Notre Dame in 1874, who were then replaced by Sisters of St. Francis of Mary Immaculate in 1875, and a new schoolhouse was built in 1887 and expanded in 1897. A building for a high school on Third Street, to the north of the church building, was acquired in 1914, and opened later that year with 14 students. This was the first 4-year parish high school in the city of Columbus.

The present elementary school building was constructed in 1956, and the high school moved from its old site on Third Street to the old primary school building at 673 South Mohawk Street. At the recommendation of the pastor, the closure of the high school was announced in 1965, with most remaining students transferring to Father Wehrle High School, which in turn closed in 1991. The last class of 78 seniors graduated in 1968; St. Mary's High School graduated around 3,300 students over its 50-year existence.

Due to growing enrollment at the parish school, the parish proposed moving the historic rectory of the church 75 feet to the west and closer to an adjacent street, to allow for an expansion of the elementary and middle school. Due to the protected status of the church, the plan is under scrutiny by community groups and preservationists. In 2020, the parish also acquired a nearby historic Civil War-era schoolhouse from the City of Columbus for $250,000 below its appraised value, sparking critiques.

In October 2022, ground was broken for a 10,000 square foot addition to the school, in addition to major renovations, allowing it to expand from 430 to 500 pupils. The new space will also house the Dominican Learning Center, which focuses primarily on adult education such as English as a Second Language and General Educational Development programs, and a primary and behavioral healthcare center operated in partnership with Nationwide Children's Hospital.

The former high school building on Mohawk Street housed office space and a U.S. Bank location until the founder of Cardinal Health, Robert D. Walter, purchased the building in 2013 and remodeled it as his residence, making it the second-largest residential home in Columbus.

== Gallery ==
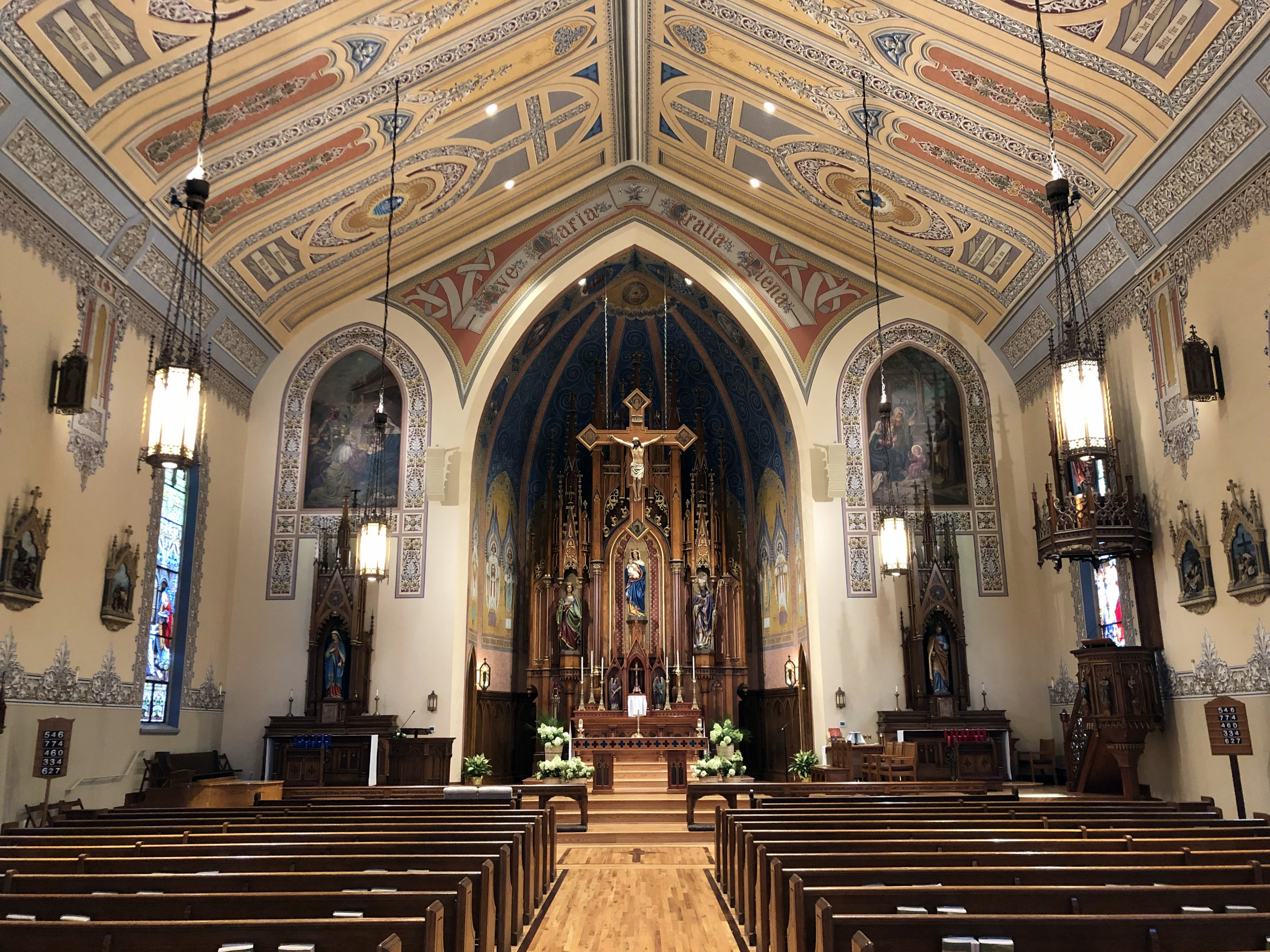

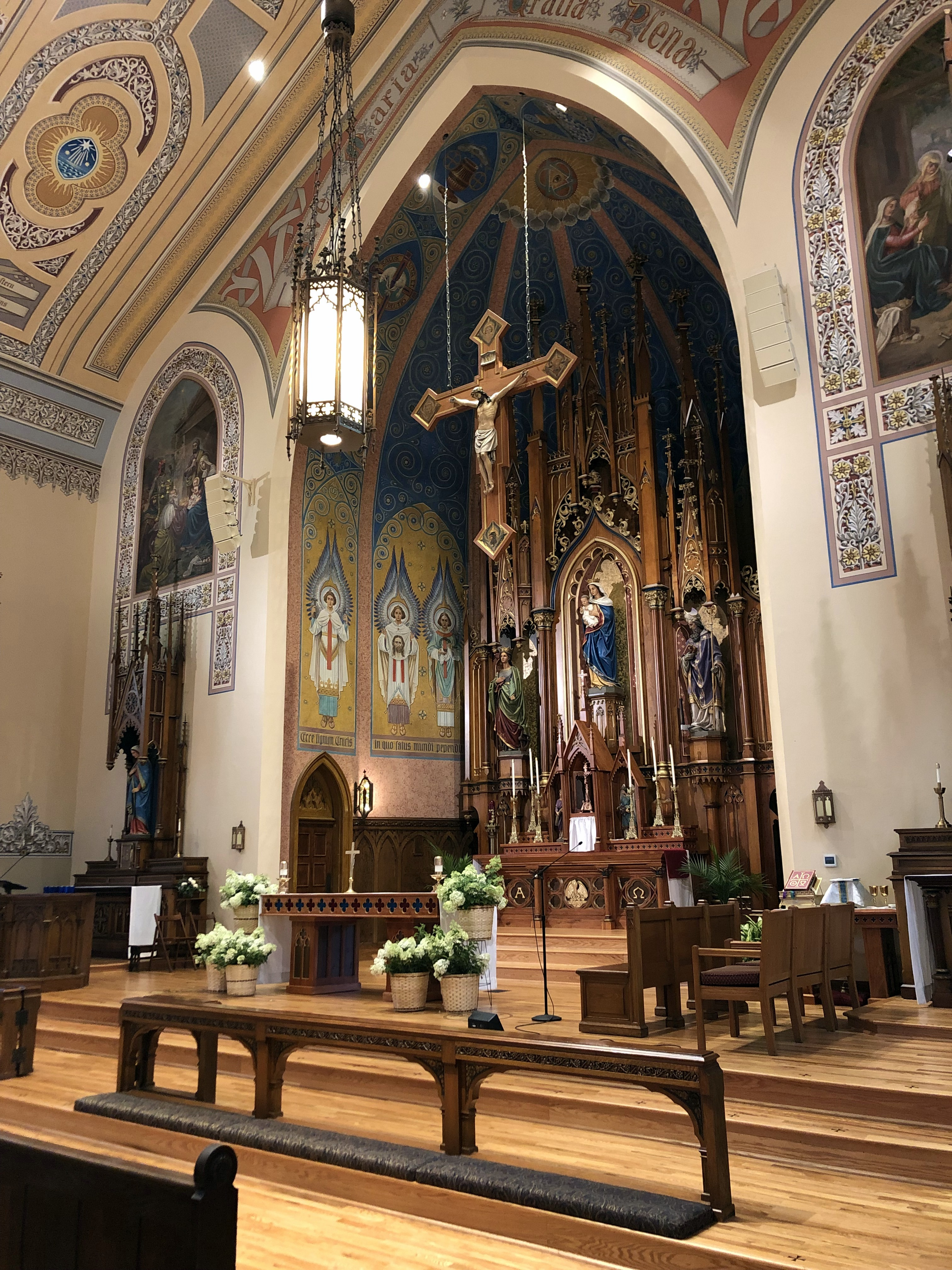

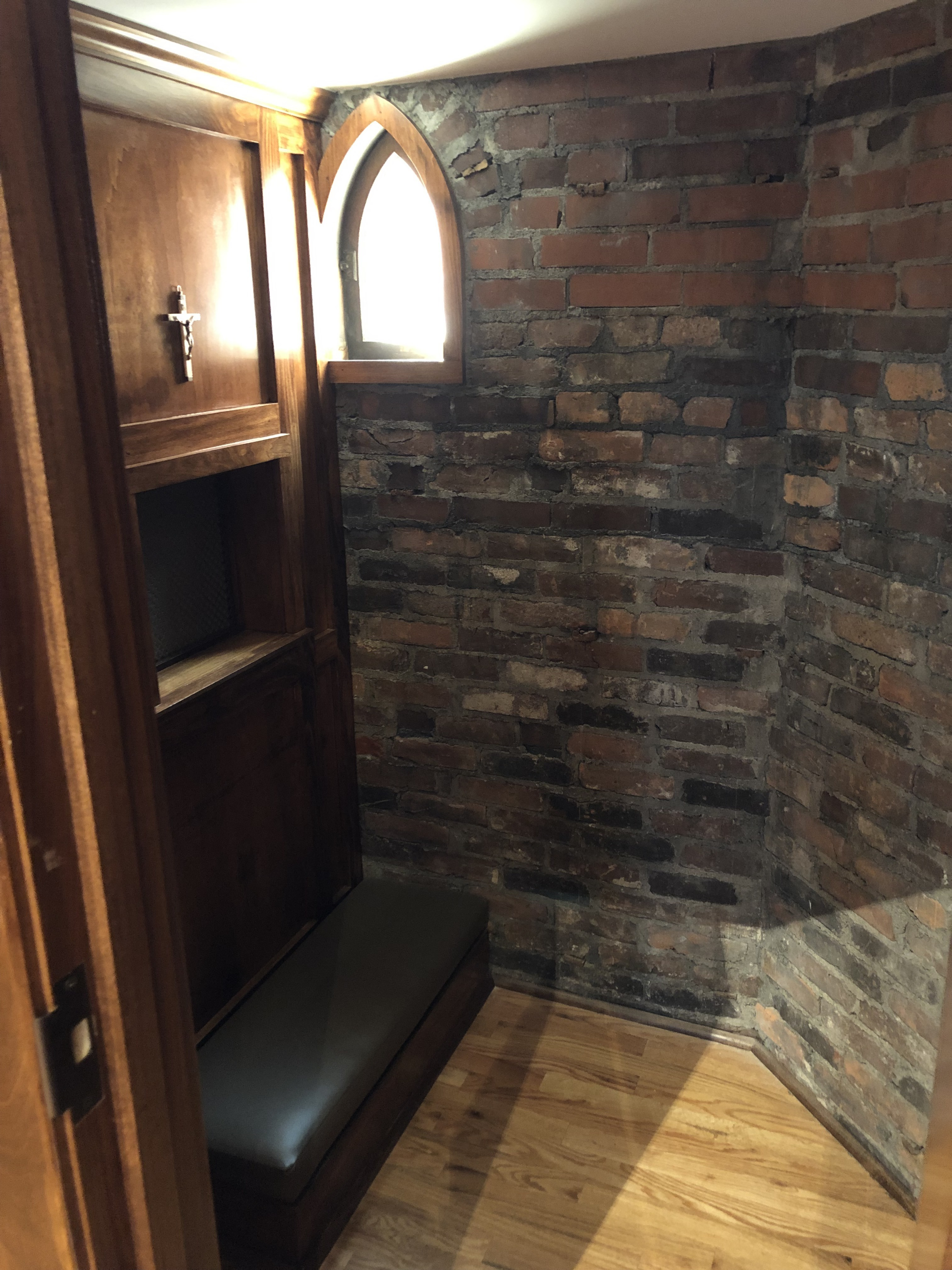

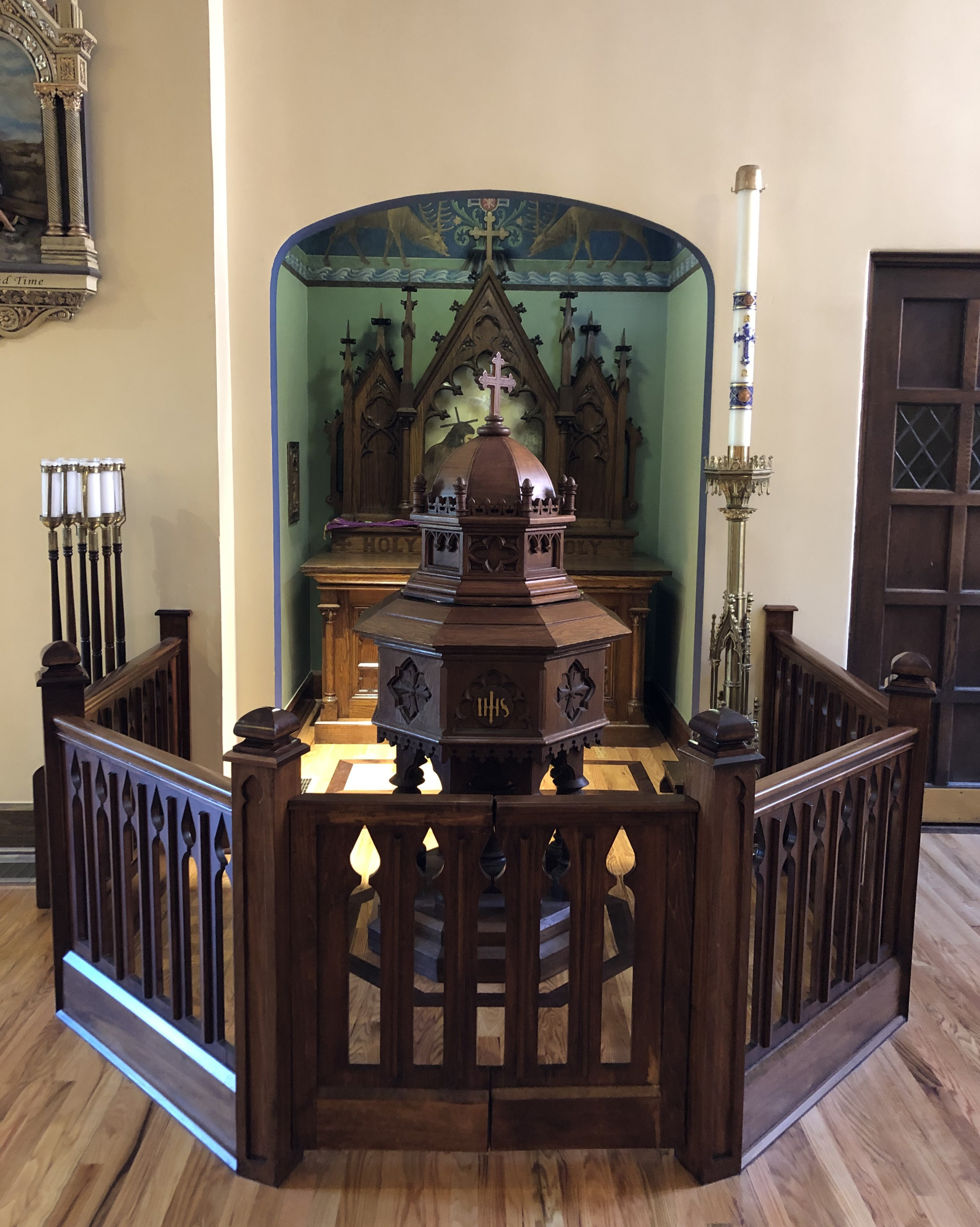

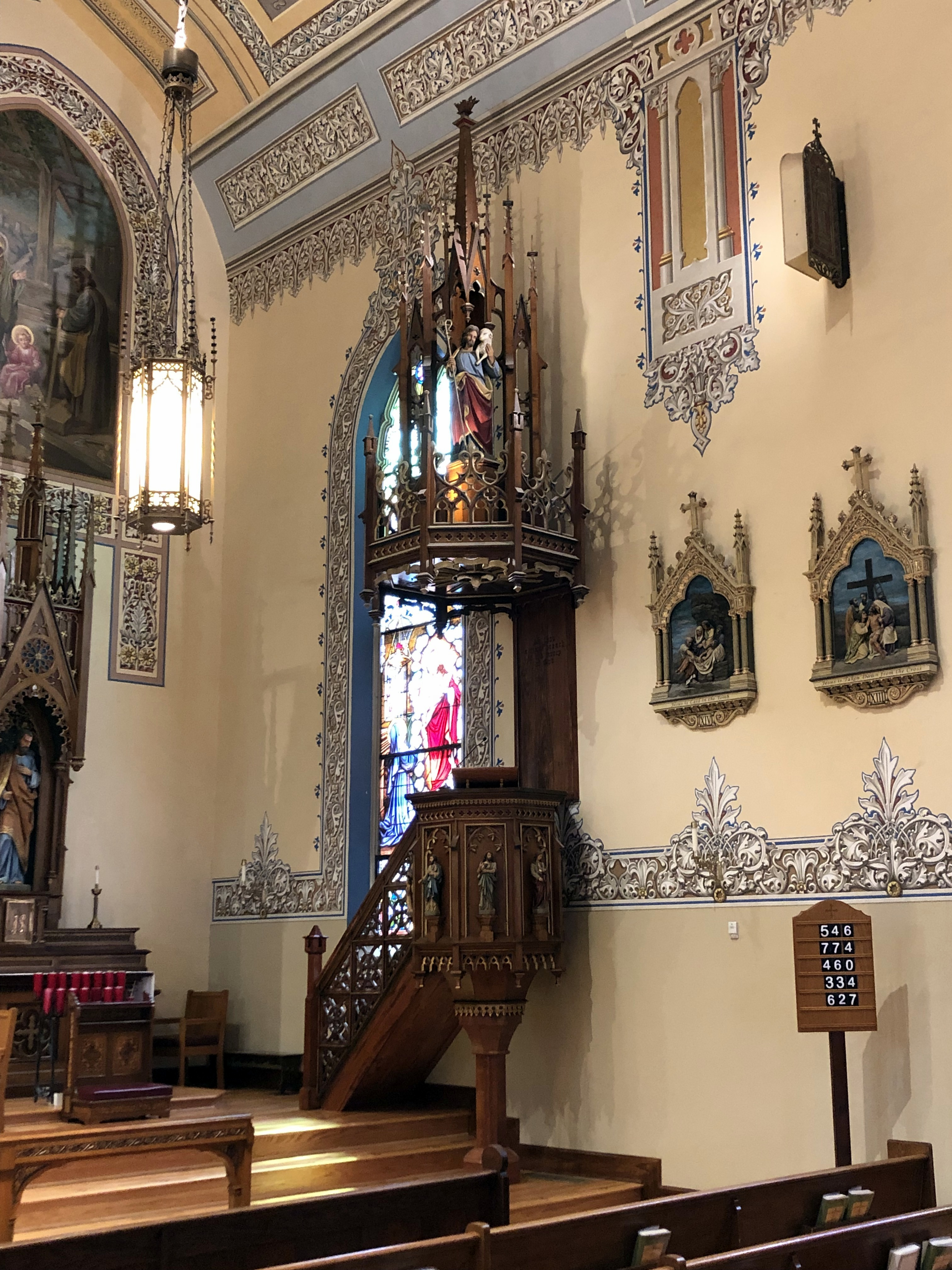

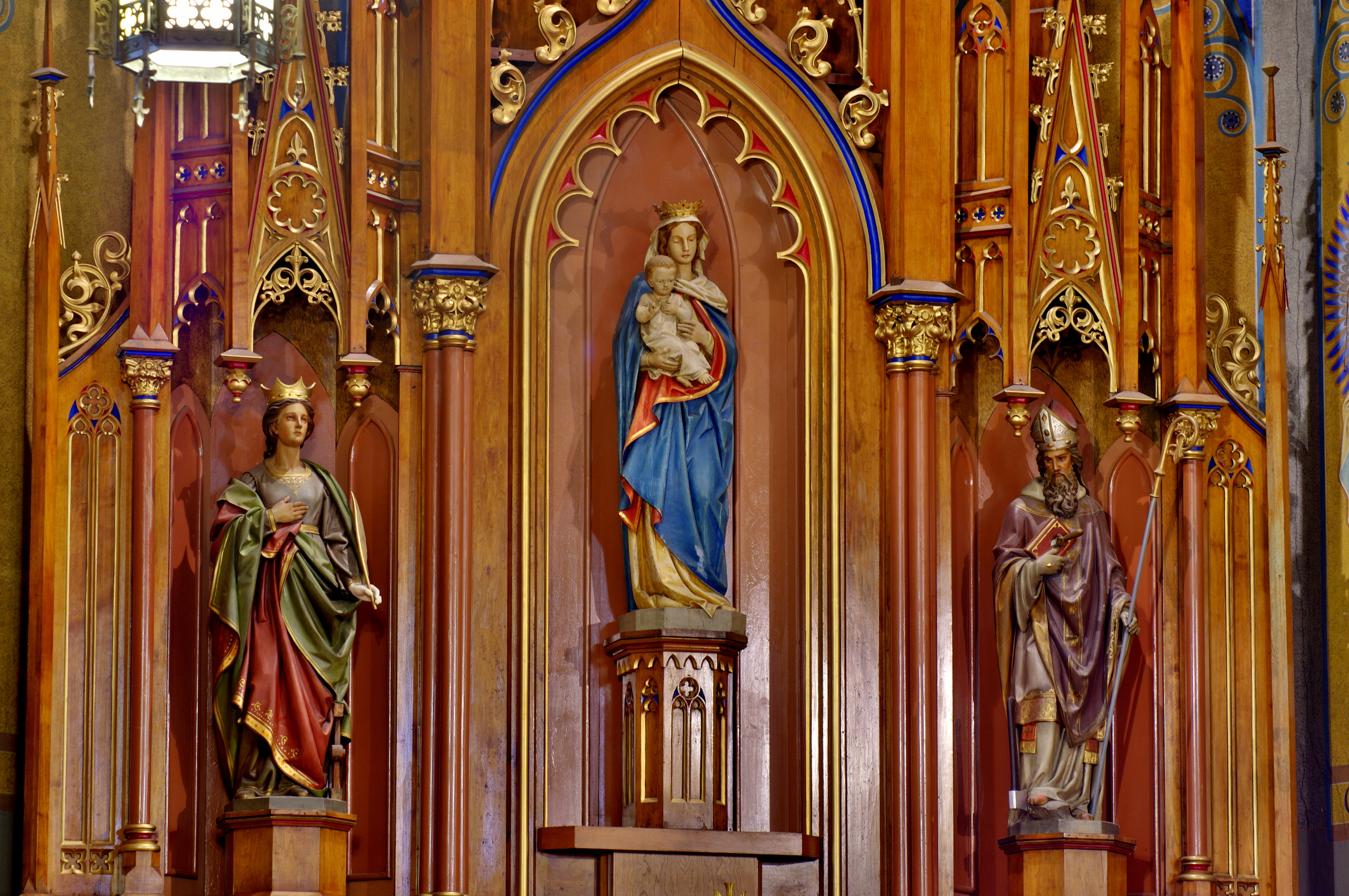

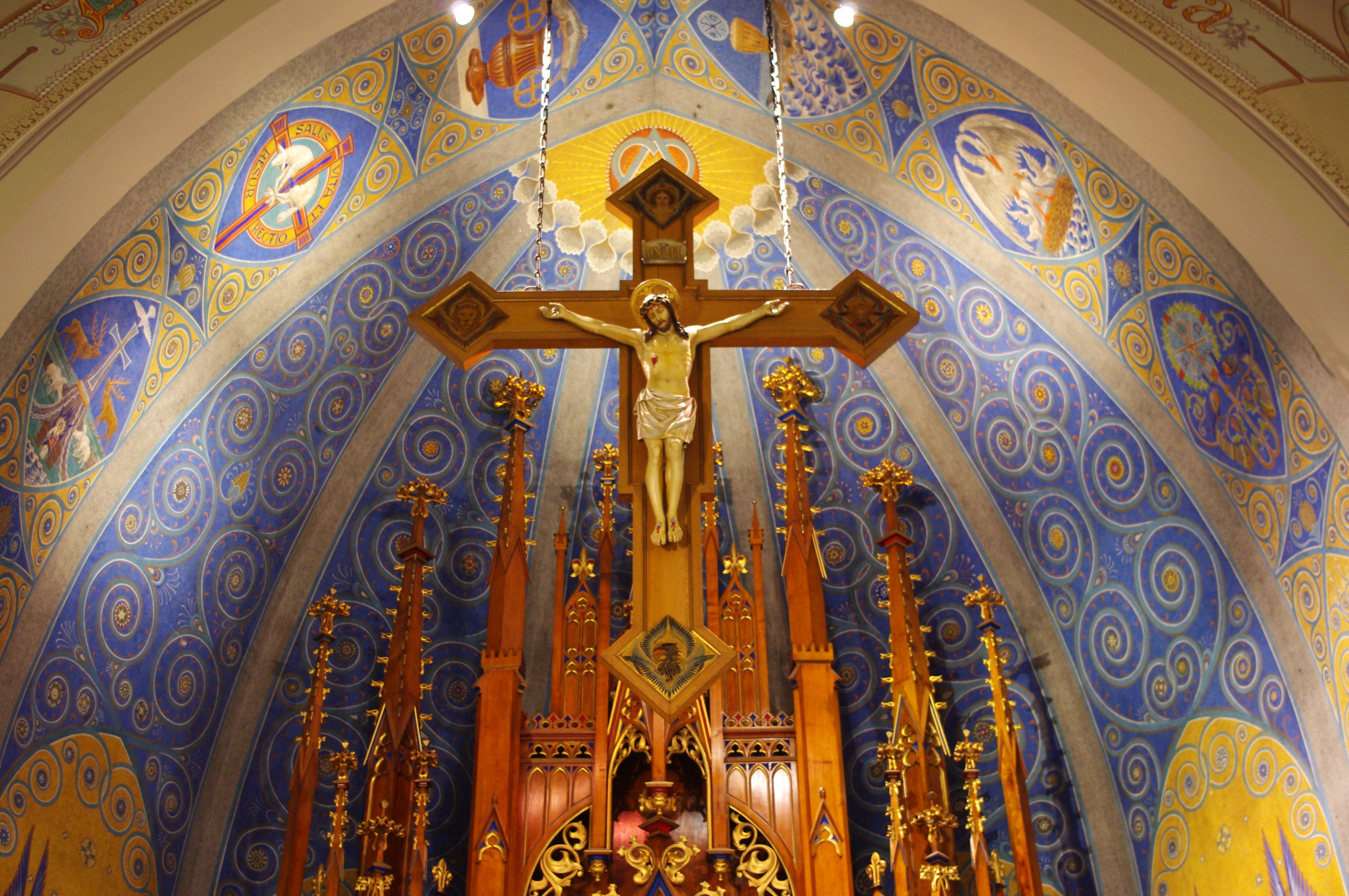

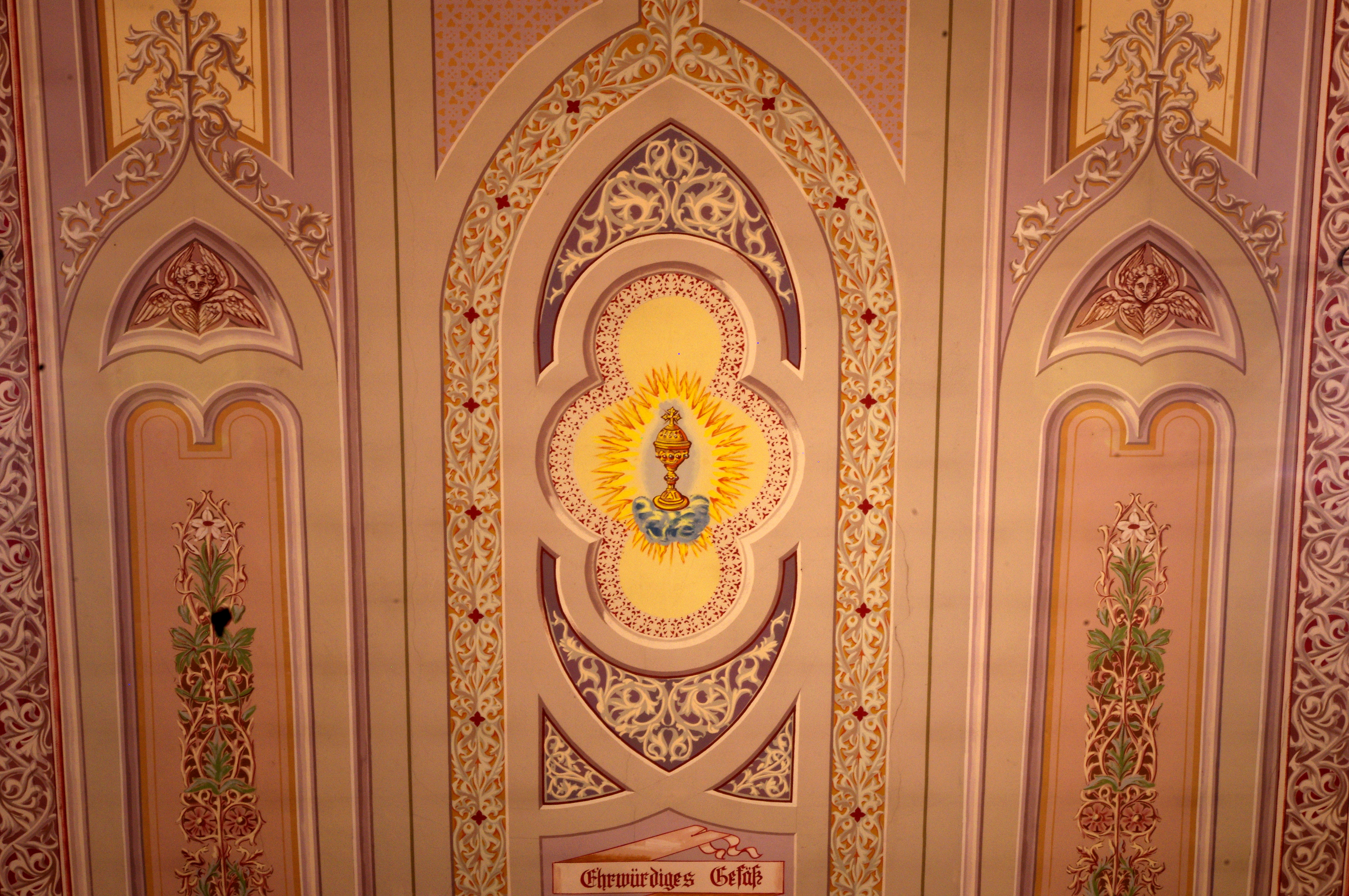
