= Schumacher Place =

Neighborhood in Columbus, Ohio

- Neighborhood of Columbus
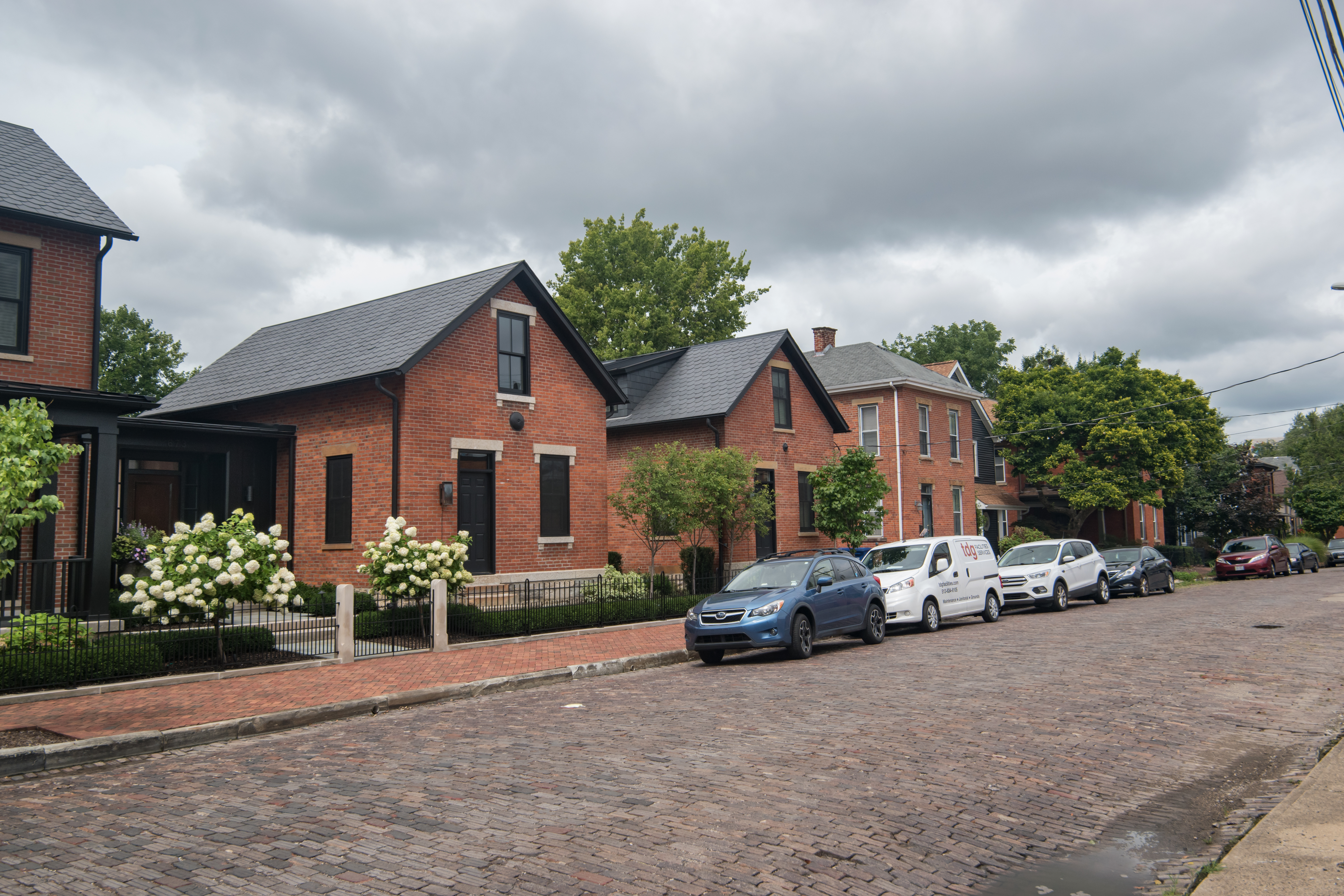
- Houses in Schumacher Place
- Interactive map of the neighborhood
- Coordinates: 39°56′54″N 82°59′09″W
- Country: United States
- State: Ohio
- County: Franklin
- City: Columbus
- ZIP Code: 43206
- Area code: 614

Schumacher Place is a neighborhood in Columbus, Ohio. It is bordered on the north by East Livingston Avenue, the east by Parsons Avenue, the south by East Whittier Street, and the west by Lathrop Street, Brust Street, South Grant Avenue, and Jaeger Street.

The neighborhood borders German Village, an upscale neighborhood to the west. Schumacher Place is similar, with century-old brick houses and brick streets. The neighborhood is however more affordable and has fewer construction and renovation restrictions. The neighborhood is also known for its car museum, the Wagner-Hagans Auto Museum. The museum, a small privately owned organization, offers free admission by appointment. It holds the collections of Steve Wagner (primarily unusual cars) and Mark Hagans (primarily cars of the 1930s).

Schumacher Place is named for a family that operated a dairy company there in the 1800s, in the southeast corner of the neighborhood.

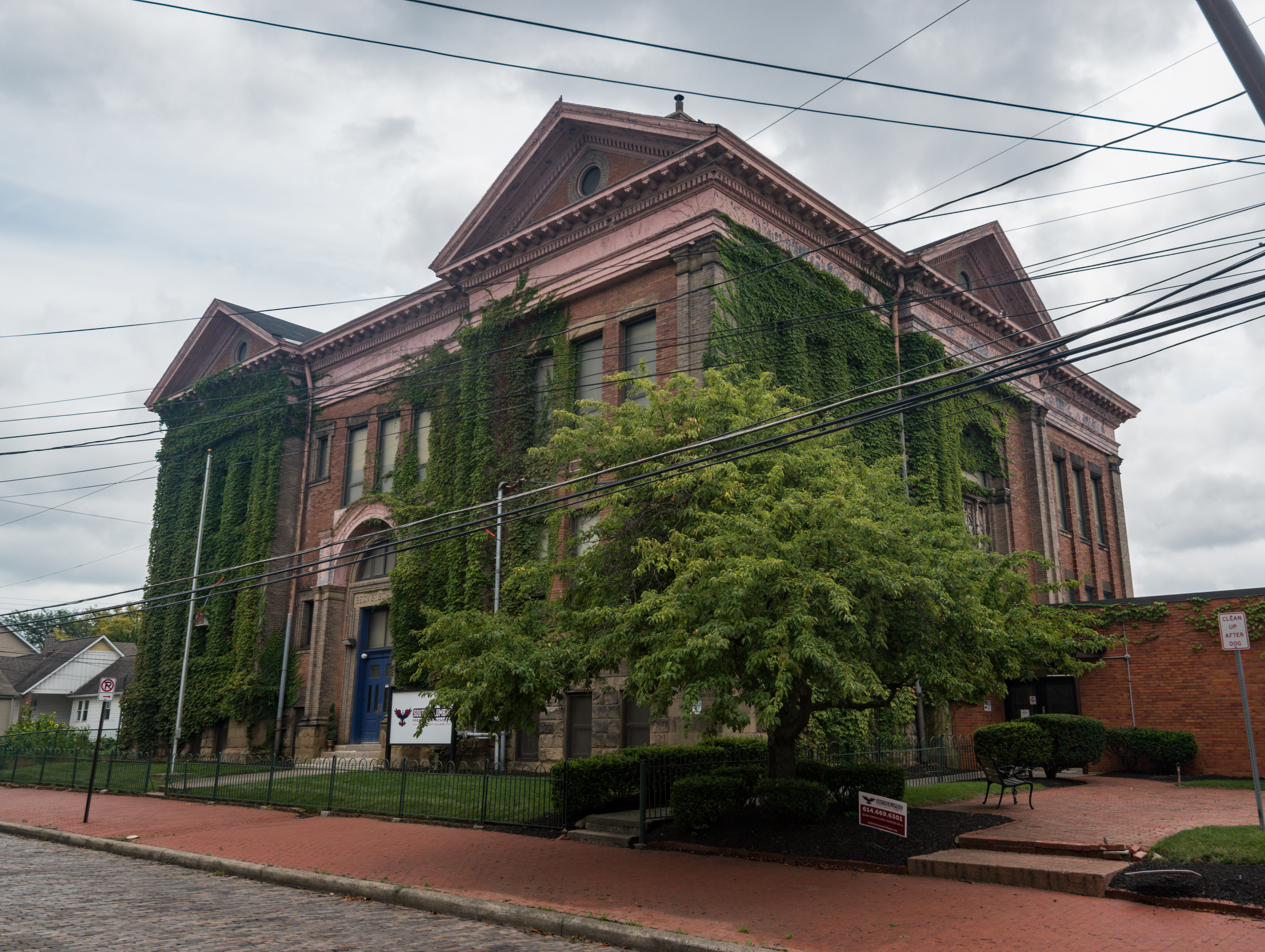
Beck Street School

== See also ==
- Neighborhoods in Columbus, Ohio
- Recreation Park (Columbus)
