= South Columbus (Ohio) =

Settlement in Columbus, Ohio, USA

Coordinates: 39°53′23″N 82°56′56″W

Interactive map of the neighborhood

South Columbus also referred to as the "South Side" or the "South End", consists of numerous urban and suburban areas south of Downtown Columbus, Ohio, United States. It is part of the native Columbus geographical terminology of the large residential urban communities outside Downtown, including German Village, Schumacher Place, and the Brewery District. South Columbus is defined as the entire southeastern portion of Columbus, bordered by the Scioto River to the west, bounded by Interstate 70 to the north, and includes the southern city limit municipalities beyond the I-270 outerbelt, such as Groveport, Lockbourne, Obetz, and the Rickenbacker International Airport.

The City of Columbus has designated portions of the South Side as a Community Reinvestment Area that is "ready for revitalization", with available 15-year, 100 percent tax abatements for all projects that include 10 percent affordable housing, with options to buy out of the requirement.
