= Columbus City Schools =

School district for Columbus, Ohio

- Location of the district in Franklin County

Location
- Columbus, Ohio, United States
- Coordinates: 39°59′N 82°59′W

District information
- Grades: K-12
- Established: 1845; 181 years ago
- President: Christina Vera
- Vice-president: Dr. Tina D. Pierce
- Superintendent: Angela Chapman

Students and staff
- Students: 46,686 (2020-2021 average)
- Teachers: 4,166 (Oct 2007)
- Staff: 7,181 FTE (Oct 2007)
- Athletic conference: OHSAA

Other information
- Website: ccsoh.us

Columbus City Schools, formerly known as Columbus Public Schools, is the official school district for the city of Columbus, Ohio, and serves most of the city (portions of the city are served by suburban school districts). The district has 46,686 students enrolled, making it the largest school district in the state of Ohio as of June 2021. At its peak during the 1971 school year the district served 110,725 students.

The first school built in the area which is now part of Columbus was a log cabin school-house built in Franklinton, in 1805. It was not until 1845 that the state of Ohio Legislature entrusted the management of Columbus schools to a Board of Education. Two years later the school board elected Dr. Asa Lord as the district's first superintendent. Dr. Gene T. Harris served as the 19th superintendent of Columbus City Schools and was succeeded by Dr. Dan Good. For most of its history, the district has been referred to as "Columbus Public Schools". In August 2007, the district decided to begin using its official name of "Columbus City Schools."

== 1977 desegregation ==
Although technically the landmark Brown v. Board of Education case made segregation in schools illegal, some schools were still segregated by the neighborhoods they served. In March 1977 Federal District Court Judge Robert M. Duncan ruled in Penick v. Columbus Board of Education that the school boundary methods used by Columbus Public Schools promoted segregation by sending black students to predominantly black schools and white students to predominantly white schools. The result was desegregation busing to desegregate all schools in the Columbus Public School district.

Before the 1978-1979 school year the Columbus Public School district petitioned Supreme Court Justice William Rehnquist for a stay on the forced busing, and the petition was granted. However, in April 1979 the Supreme Court made their decision and upheld the original Duncan decision.

Before this landmark decision was handed down, the district had a peak of 110,725 students enrolled in 1971 and operated 20 high schools. Many parents moved their children out of the Columbus district to the suburbs to avoid the desegregation. As a result, district enrollment significantly declined, forcing two high schools, Central High School (In 1982) and North High School (In 1979) to be closed, as well as several elementary and middle schools.

== School enrollment ==
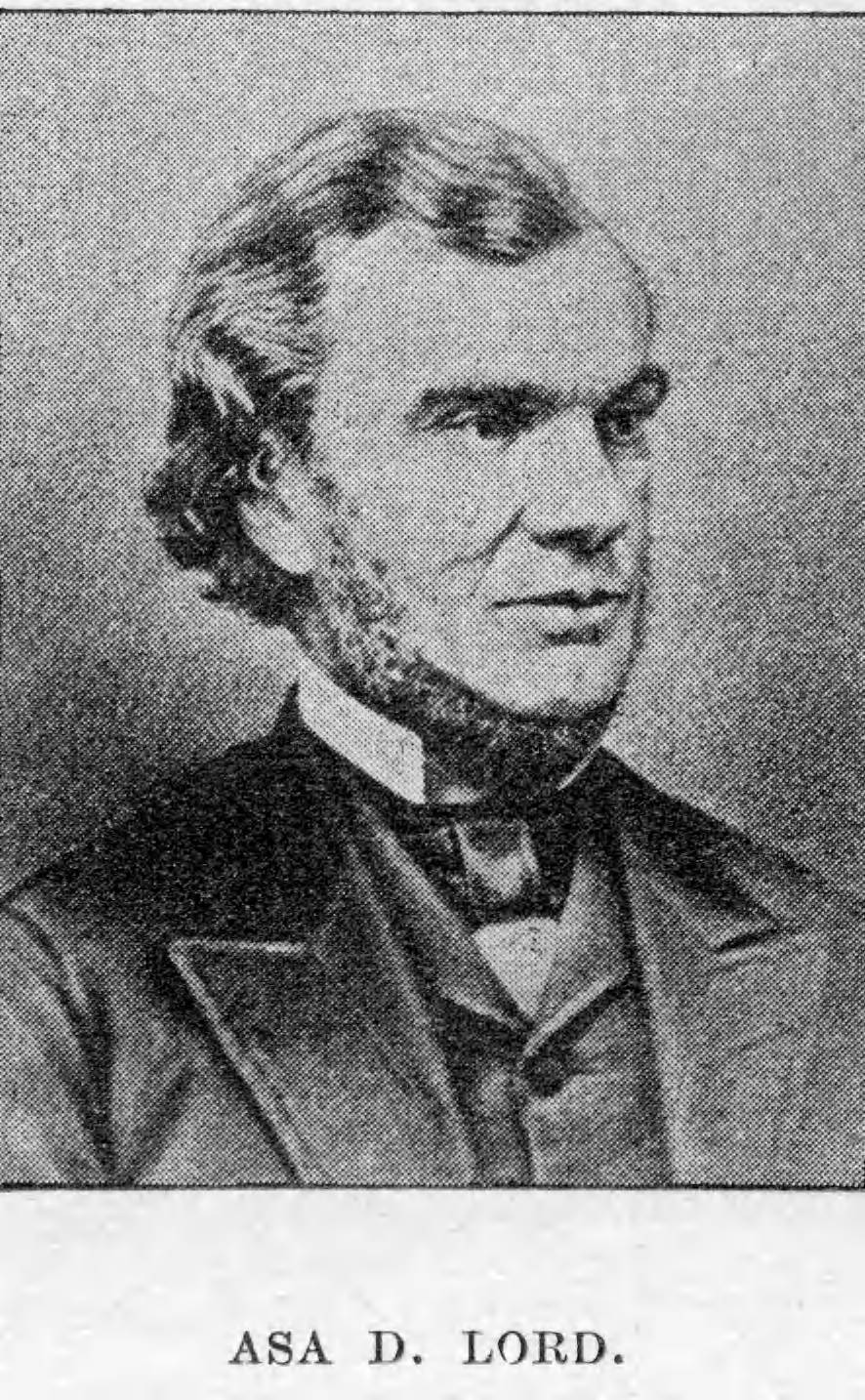
Asa Dearborn Lord, first superintendent

Enrollment figures in the school district have significantly increased in the past and recently decreased. Following is a list of school enrollments over the years.

District Enrollment
| Year | Enrollment |
|---|---|
| 1920 | 32,442 |
| 1947 | 40,000 (estimate) |
| 1962 | 93,000 (estimate) |
| 1971 | 110,725 (all-time peak) |
| 1976 | 95,571 |
| 1980 | 72,698 |
| 1995 | 62,812 |
| 1996 | 63,610 |
| 2007 | 55,235 |
| 2012 | 50,784 |
| 2019 | 48,982 |
| 2023 | 46,345 |

== Board of education ==
There are seven members on the Board of Education. Current members are listed below:

- Christina Vera, President
- Dr. Tina D. Pierce, Vice-President
- Jennifer A. Adair
- Sarah Ingles
- Michael Cole
- Ramona R. Reyes
- Brandon Simmons

== Schools ==
There are approximately 118 active schools in the district. Schools include:

=== Elementary schools ===
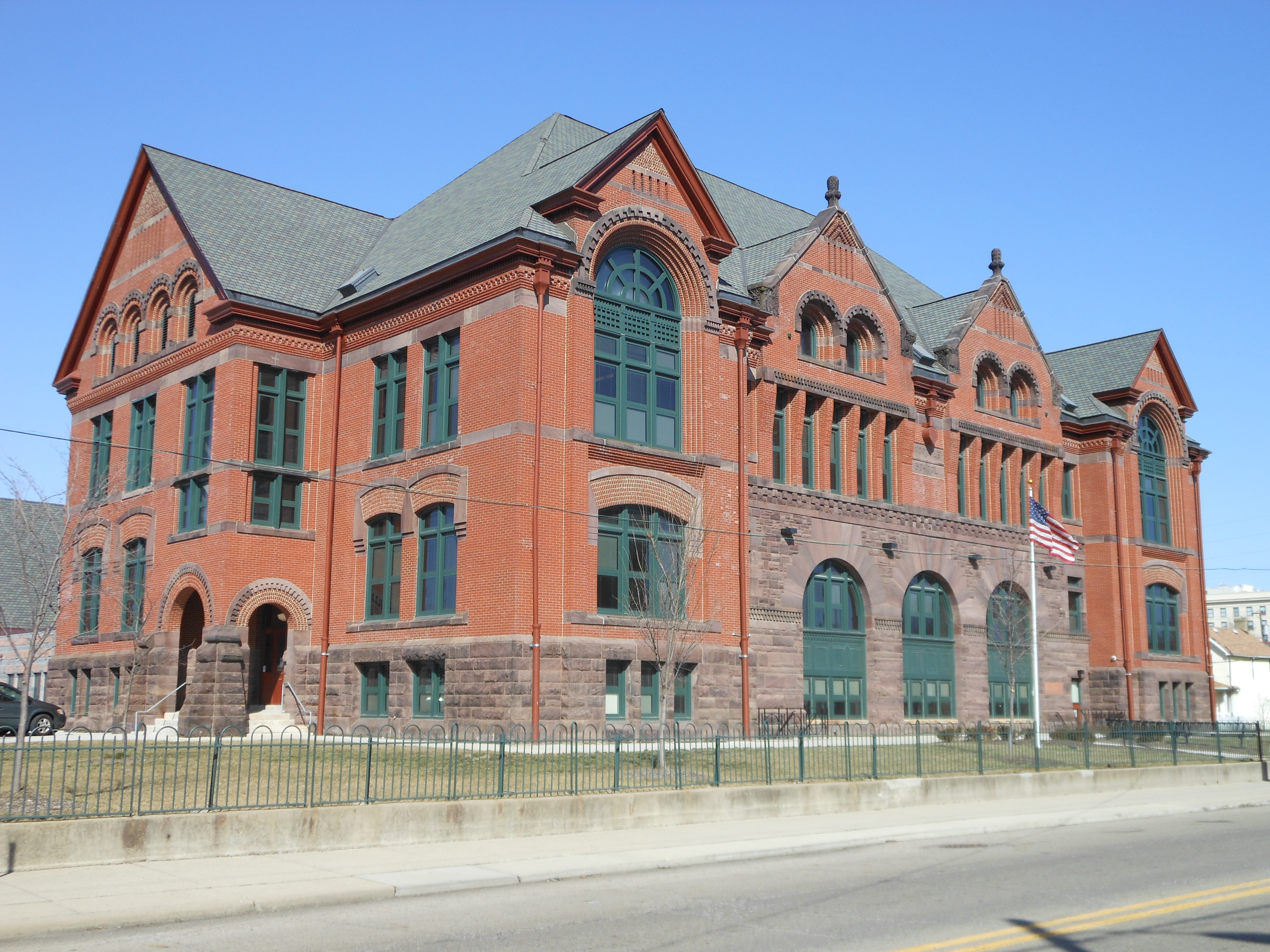
Avondale Elementary School

- Alpine Elementary School
- Avalon Elementary School
- Avondale Elementary School
- Beatty Park Elementary School
- Berwick Alternative Elementary School
- Binns Elementary School
- Burroughs Elementary School
- Cassady Alternative Elementary School
- Cedarwood Alternative Elementary School

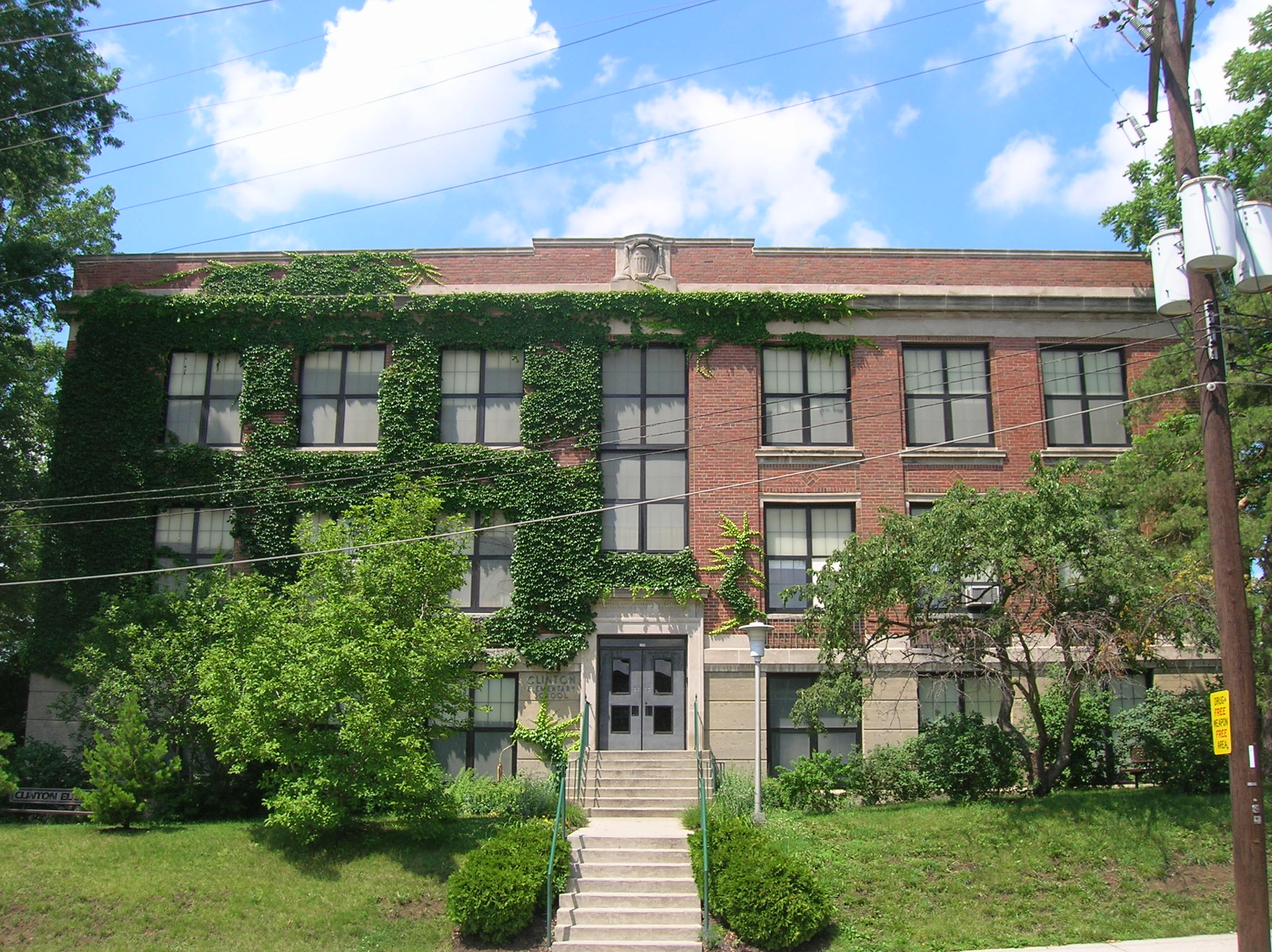
Clinton Elementary School

- Clinton Elementary School
- Colerain Elementary School
- Columbus Spanish Immersion Academy
- Como Elementary School
- Cranbrook Elementary School
- Devonshire Alternative Elementary School
- Duxberry Park Alternative Elementary School
- Eakin Elementary School
- East Columbus Elementary School
- East Linden Elementary School
- Eastgate Elementary School
- Easthaven Elementary School
- Ecole Kenwood French Immersion Elementary School
- Fairmoor Elementary School
- Forest Park Elementary School
- Gables Elementary School
- Georgian Heights Alternative Elementary School
- Hamilton Alternative Elementary School

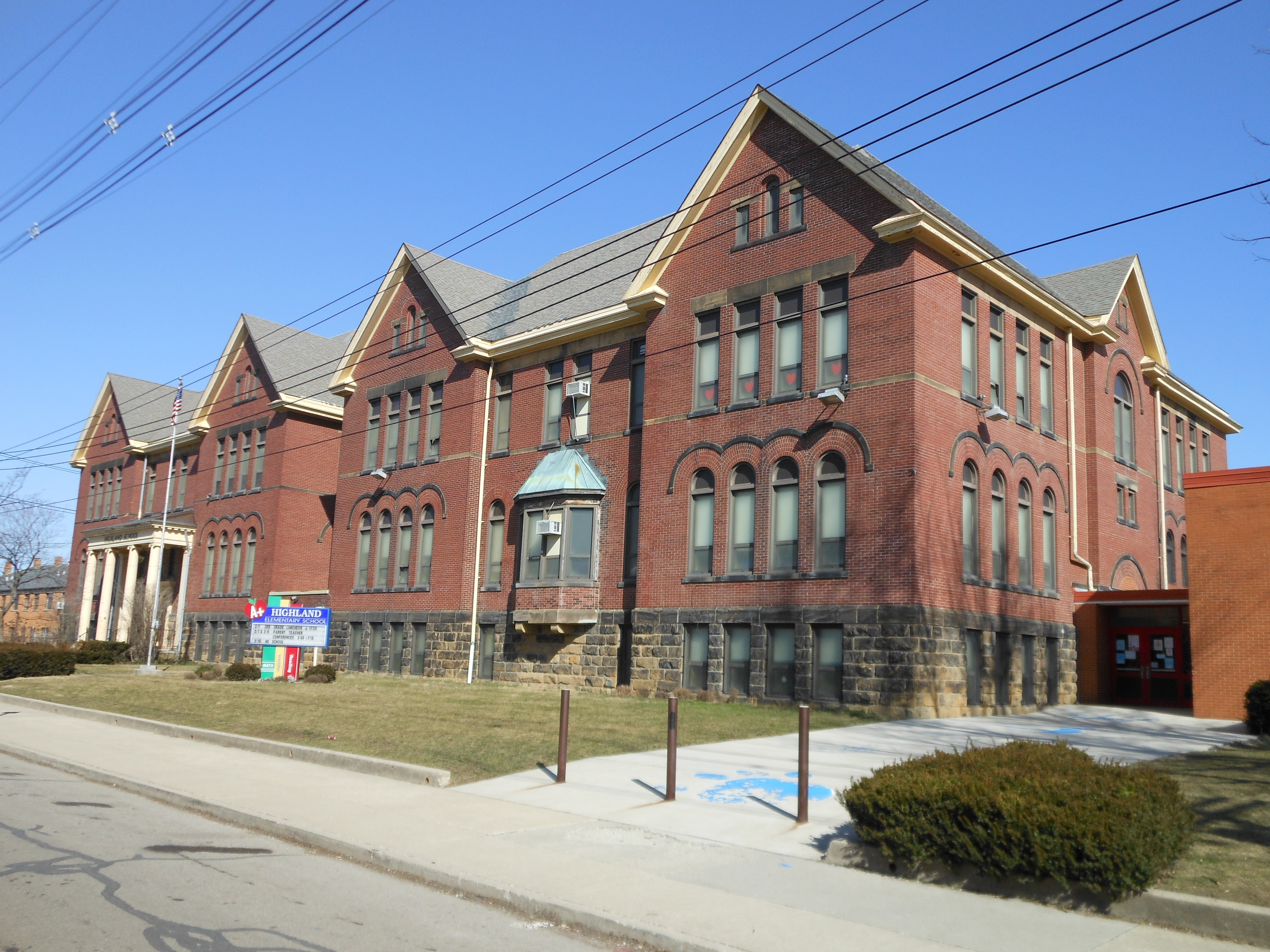
Highland Elementary School

- Highland Elementary School
- Hubbard Elementary School
- Huy / AG Bell Elementary School
- Indian Springs Elementary School
- Innis Elementary School
- Leawood Elementary School
- Liberty Elementary School
- Lincoln Park Elementary School
- Lindbergh Elementary School
- Linden STEM Academy
- Livingston Avenue Elementary School
- Maize Elementary School
- Northgate Intermediate School (grades 4-5)
- North Linden Elementary School
- Northtowne Elementary School
- Oakland Park Alternative Elementary School
- Oakmont Elementary School
- Ohio Avenue Elementary School
- Olde Orchard Alternative Elementary School
- Parkmoor Urban Academy Elementary School
- Parsons Elementary School
- Salem Elementary School
- Scottwood Elementary School
- Shady Lane Elementary School
- Siebert Elementary School
- South Mifflin STEM Academy

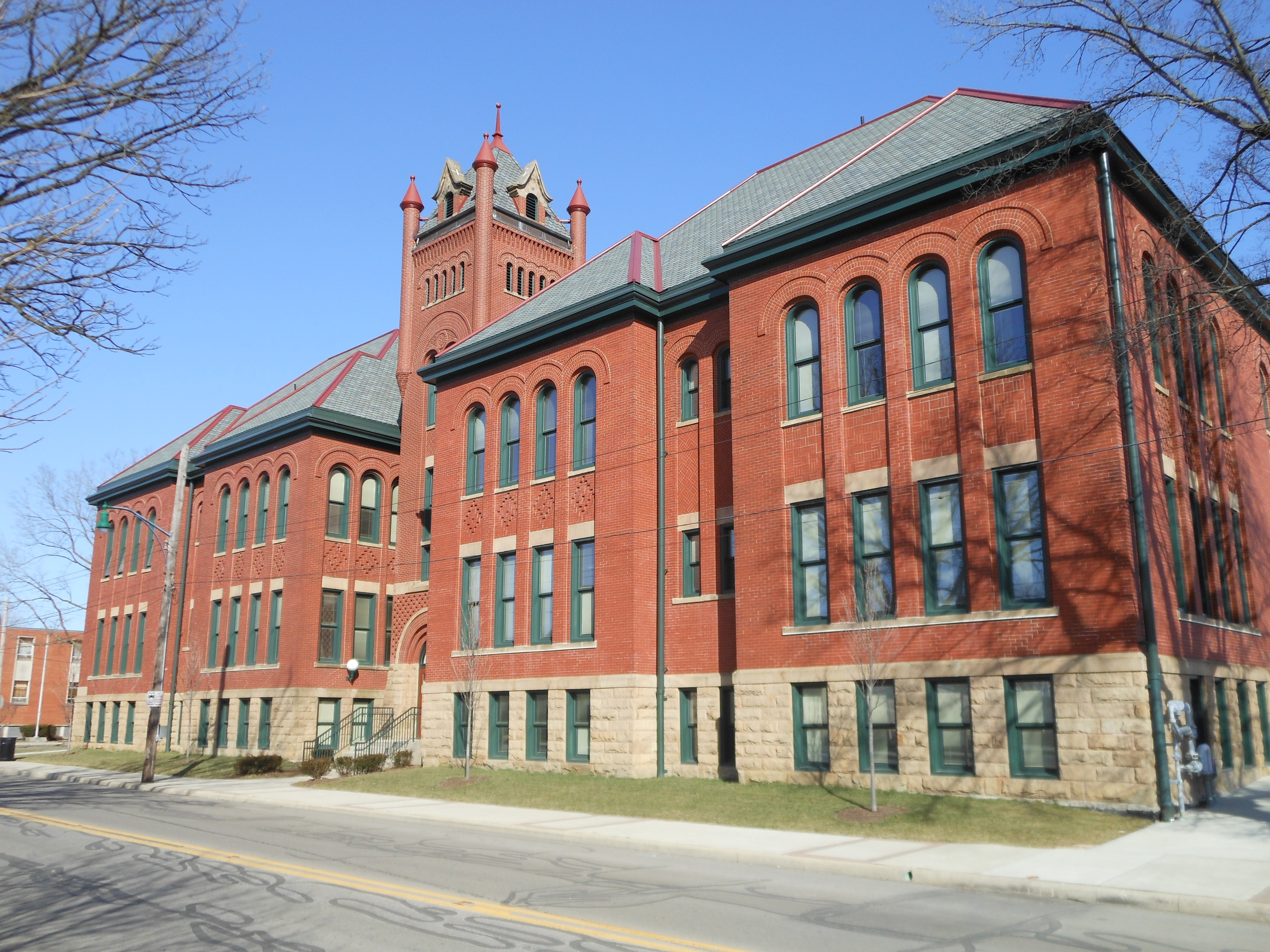
Southwood Elementary School

- Southwood Elementary School
- Special Education Center

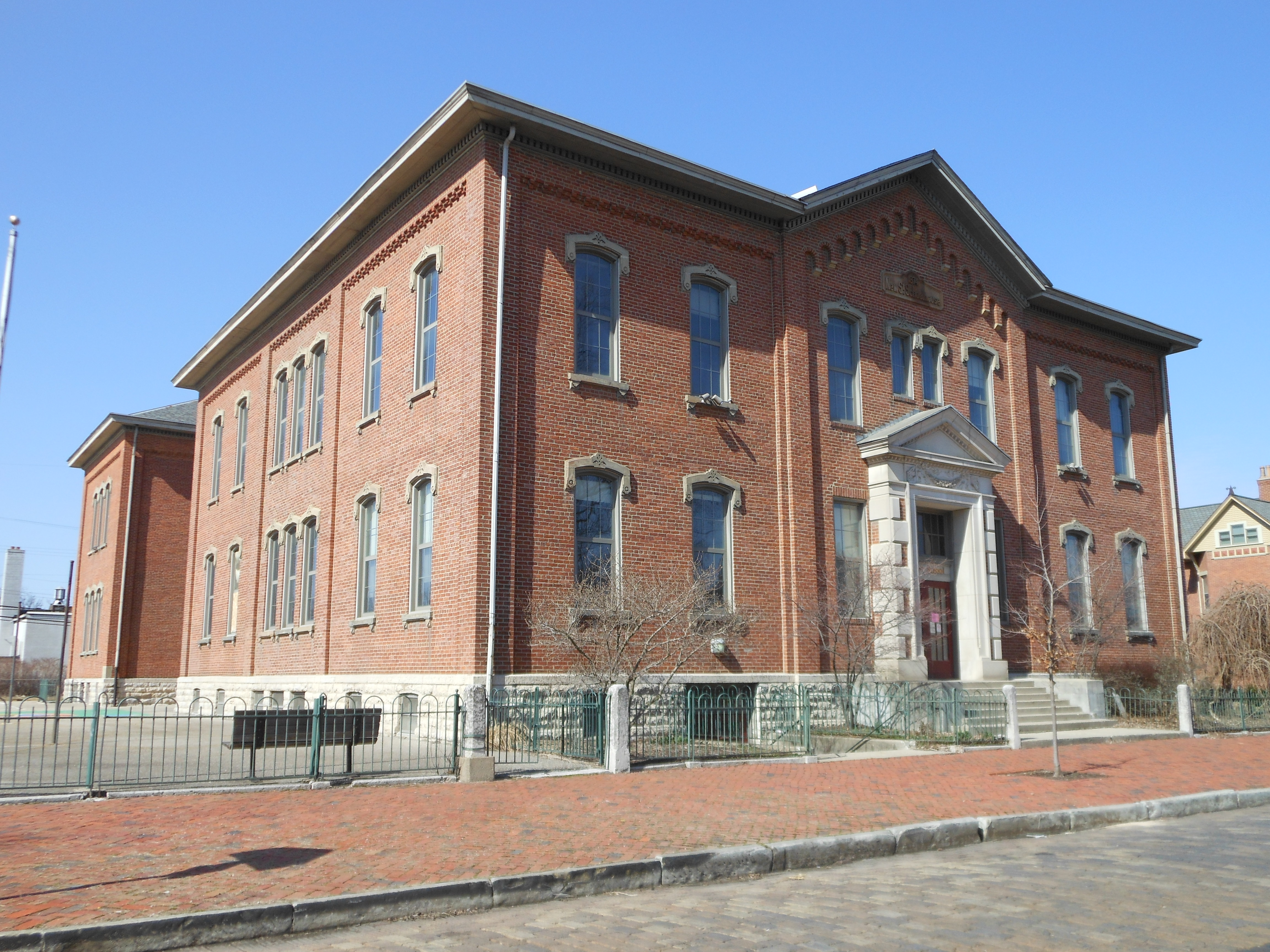
Stewart Alternative Elementary School

- Stewart Alternative Elementary School
- Sullivant Elementary School (formerly in Downtown Columbus)
- Trevitt Elementary School
- Valley Forge Elementary School
- Valleyview Elementary School
- Watkins Elementary School

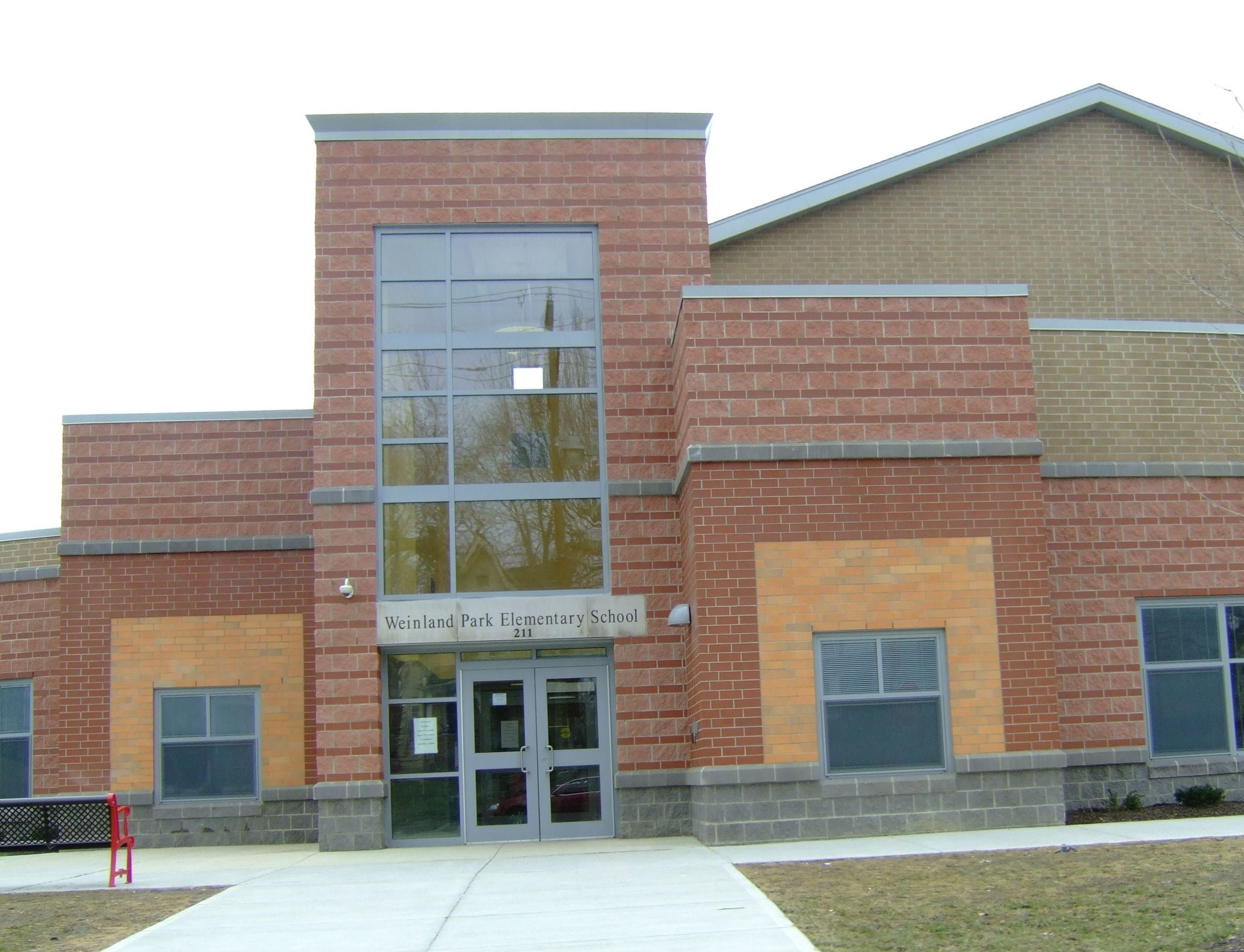
Weinland Park Elementary School

- Weinland Park Elementary School

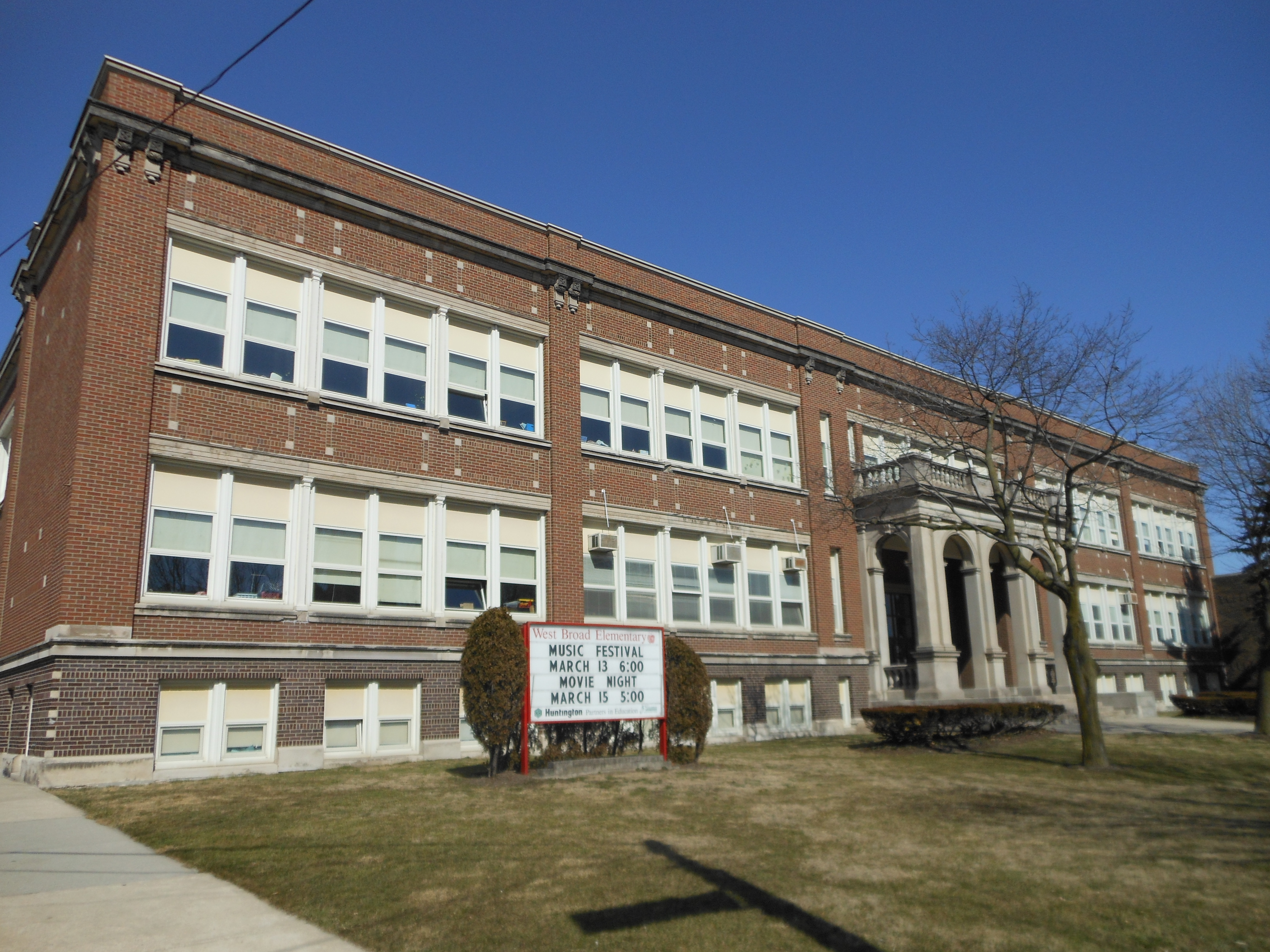
West Broad Street Elementary School

- West Broad Elementary School
- West Mound Elementary School
- Westgate Alternative Elementary School
- Windsor Alternative Elementary School
- Winterset Elementary School
- Woodcrest Elementary School

=== Middle schools ===
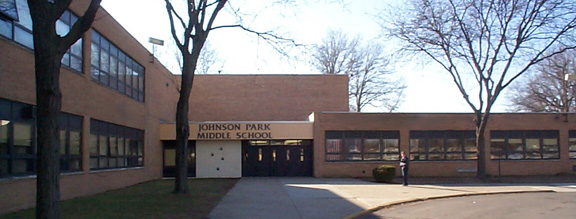
Johnson Park Middle School

- Arts Impact Middle School (AIMS)
- Buckeye Middle School
- Champion Middle School
- Columbus City Preparatory School for Boys
- Columbus City Preparatory School for Girls
- Columbus Gifted Academy (3-8)
- Dominion Middle School, formerly site of the Columbus International High School
- Hilltonia Middle School
- Johnson Park Middle School
- Medina Middle School
- Mifflin Alternative Middle School
- Ridgeview Middle School
- Sherwood Middle School
- Starling Middle School K-8
- Wedgewood Middle School
- Westmoor Middle School
- Woodward Park Middle School
- World Languages Middle School
- Yorktown Middle School

=== K-8 Alternative schools ===
- Africentric K-8
- Columbus Spanish Immersion Academy at Beaumont Elementary School
- Ecole Kenwood French Immersion School at Kenwood Elementary School
- Indianola Informal K-8
- Starling PreK-8 School (merger of Dana Elementary and Starling Middle in 2013). Starling Middle School once occupied the original West High School building, at 120 S. Central Avenue.

=== High schools ===
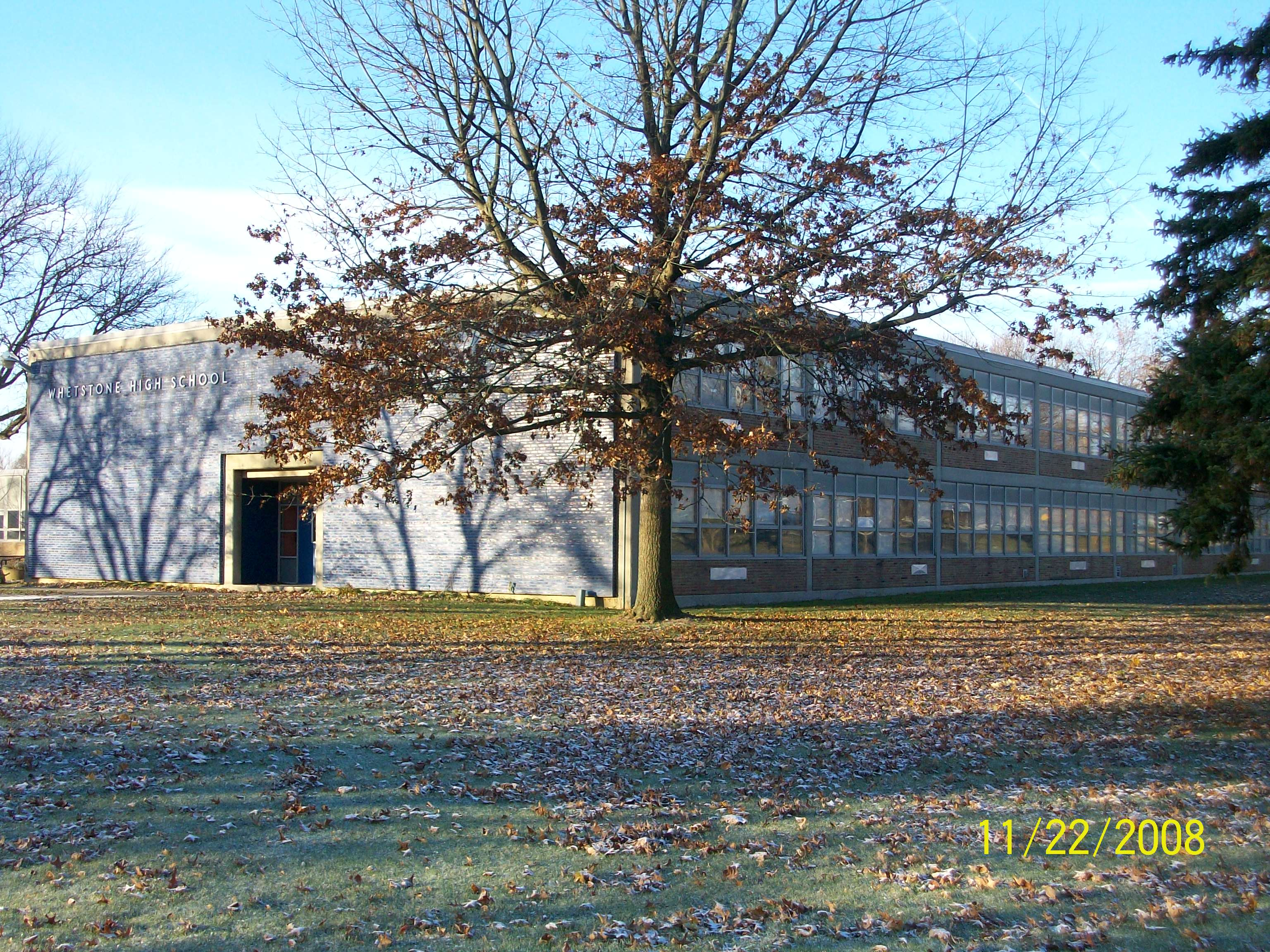
Whetstone High School

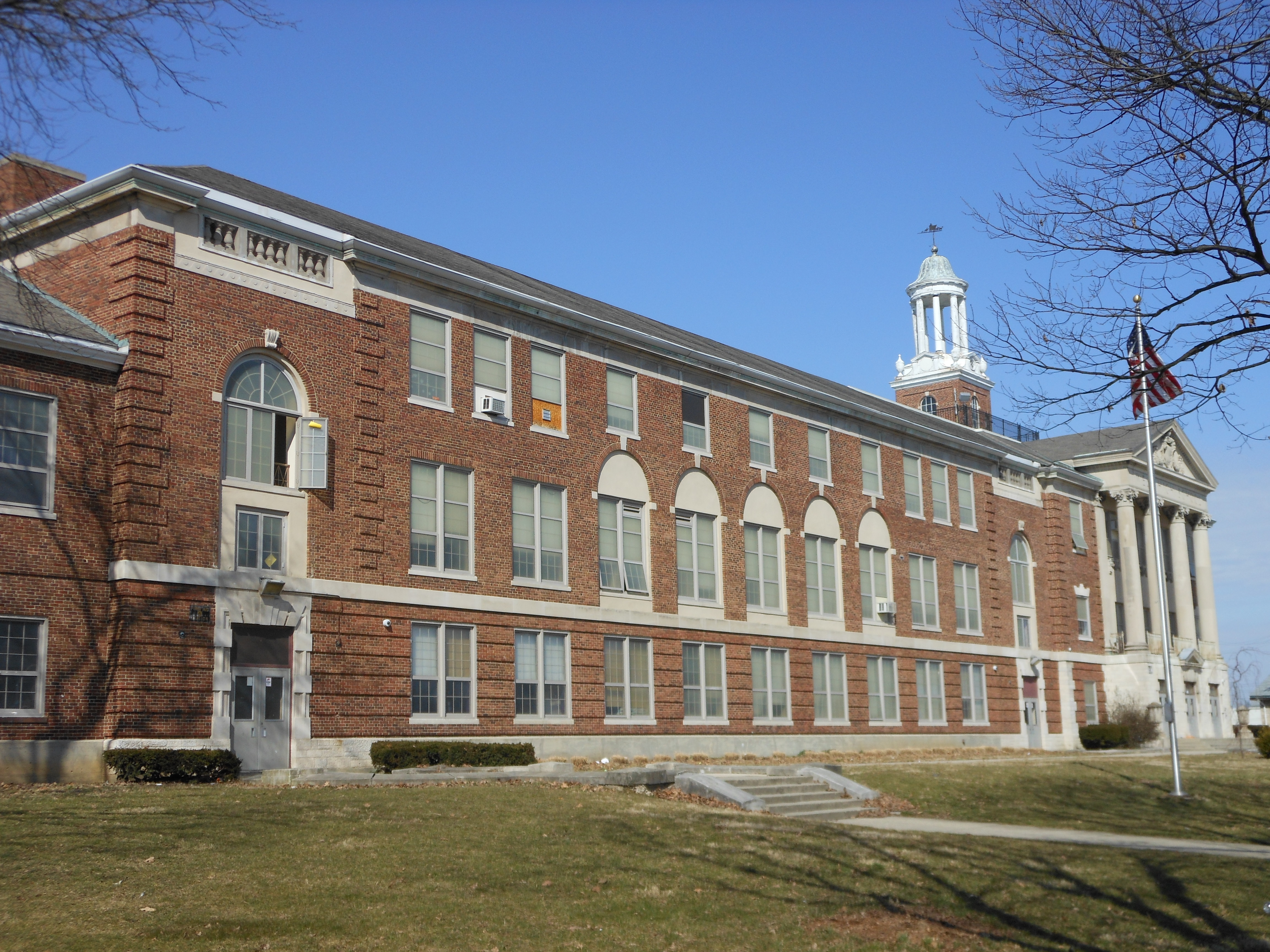
West High School

- Beechcroft High School
- Briggs High School
- Centennial High School
- Columbus Africentric Early College
- Columbus Alternative High School (CAHS)
- Columbus International High School
- Columbus Scioto 6-12
- Downtown High School
- East High School
- Eastmoor Academy
- Fort Hayes Metropolitan Education Center
- Independence High School
- Linden-McKinley High School
- Marion-Franklin High School
- Mifflin High School
- Northland High School
- South High School 7-12
- Walnut Ridge High School
- West High School
- Whetstone High School

=== Former schools ===
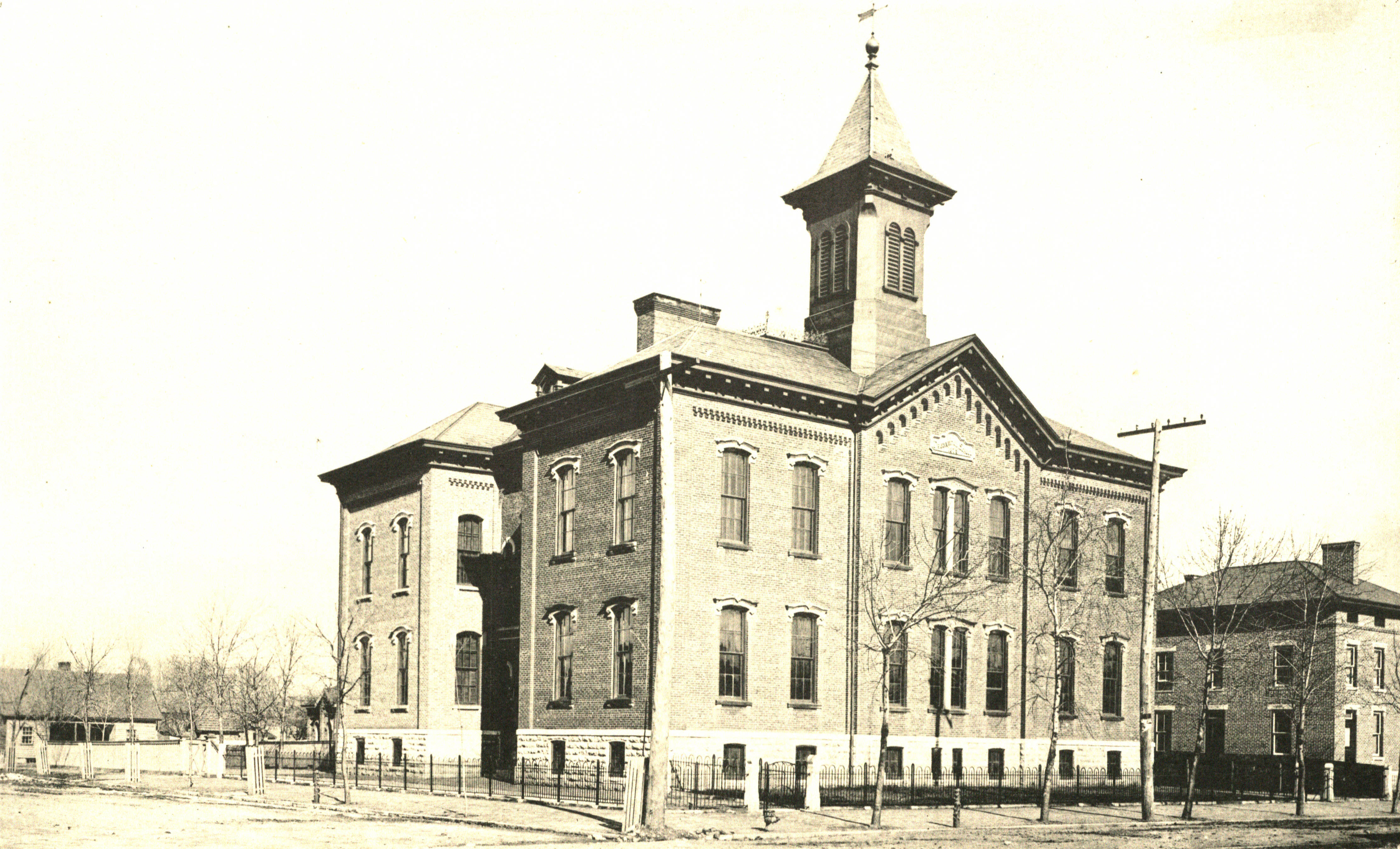
Franklinton Elementary School

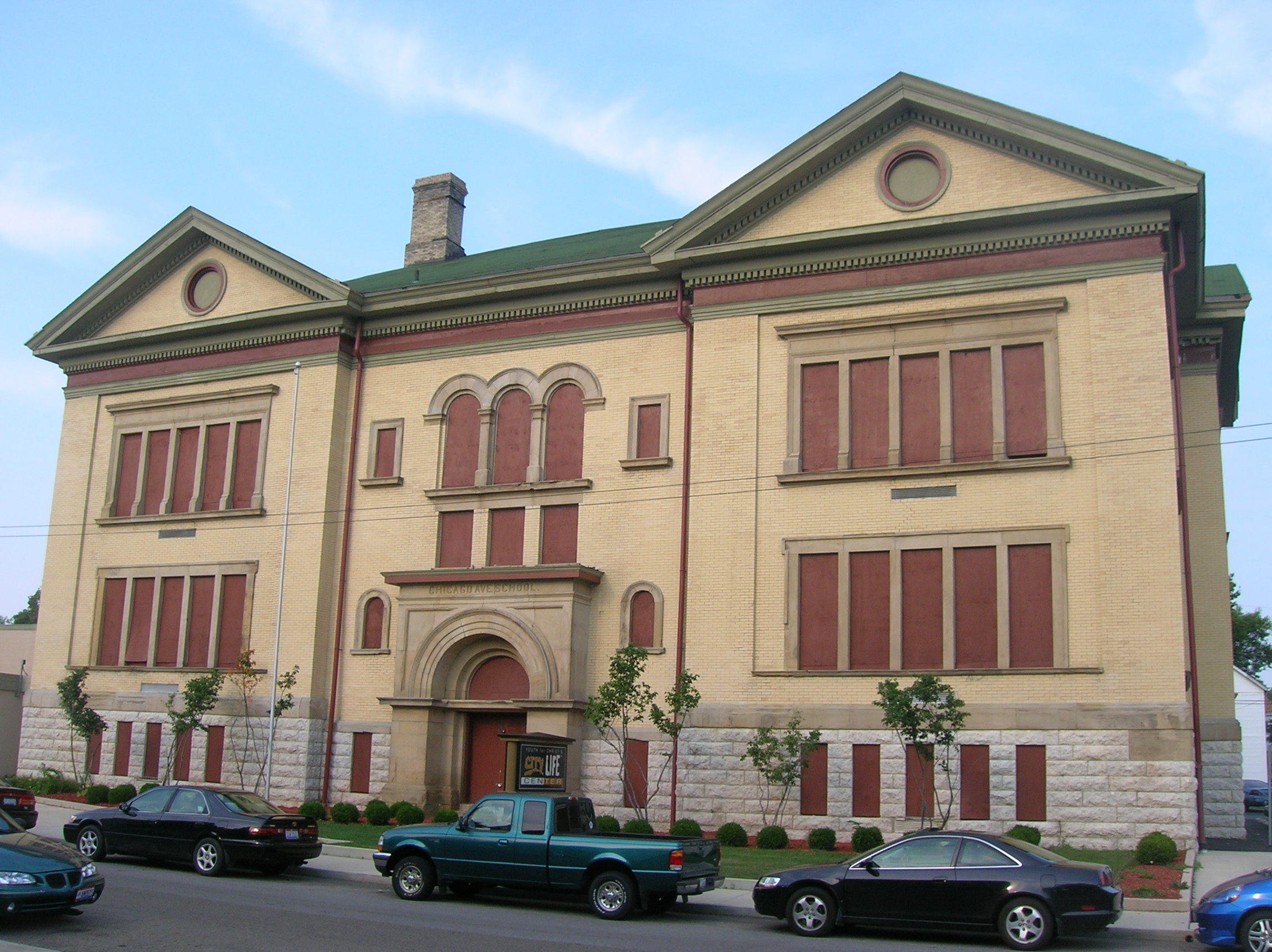
The Chicago Avenue School

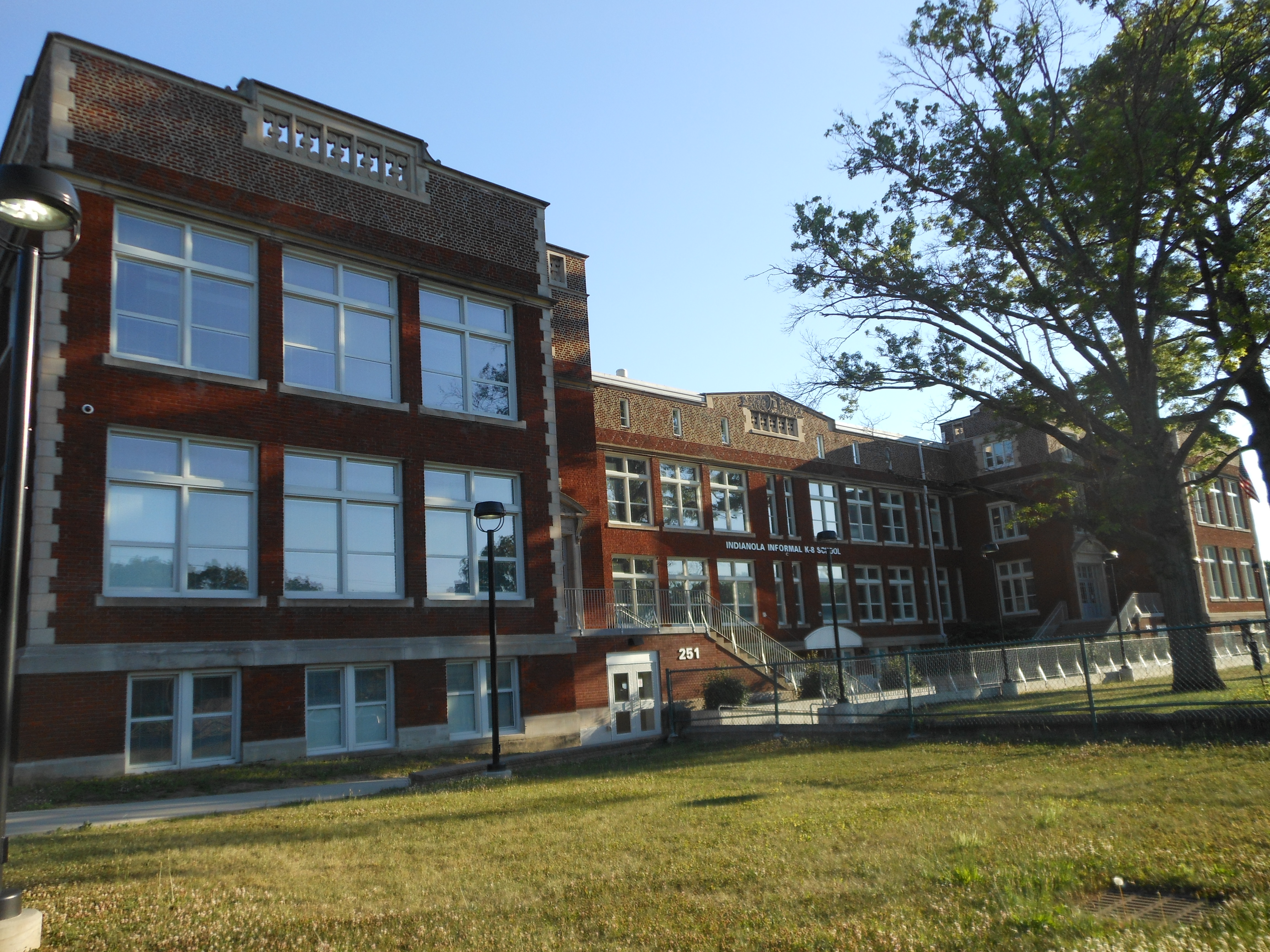
Crestview Middle School

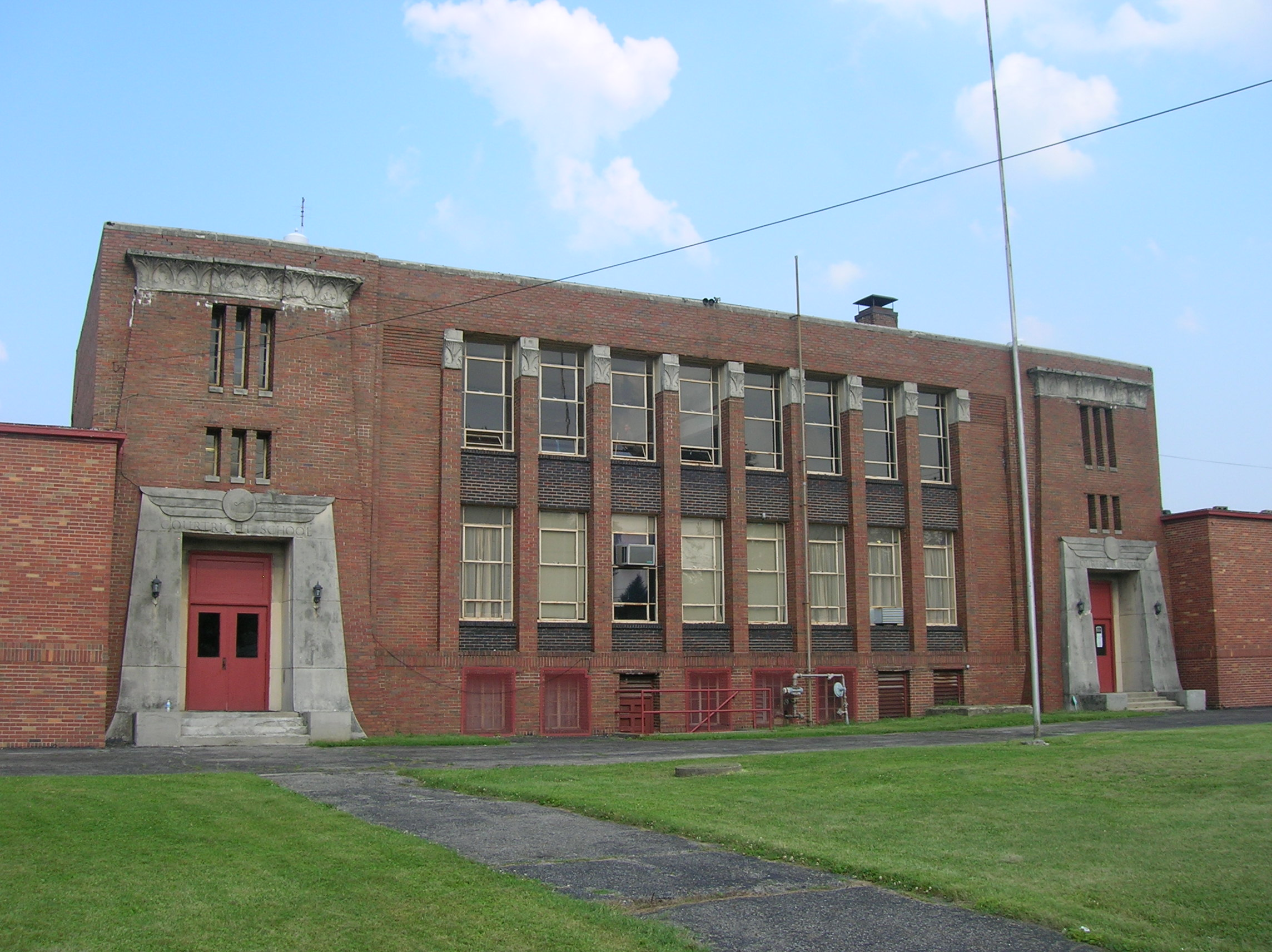
Courtright Elementary School

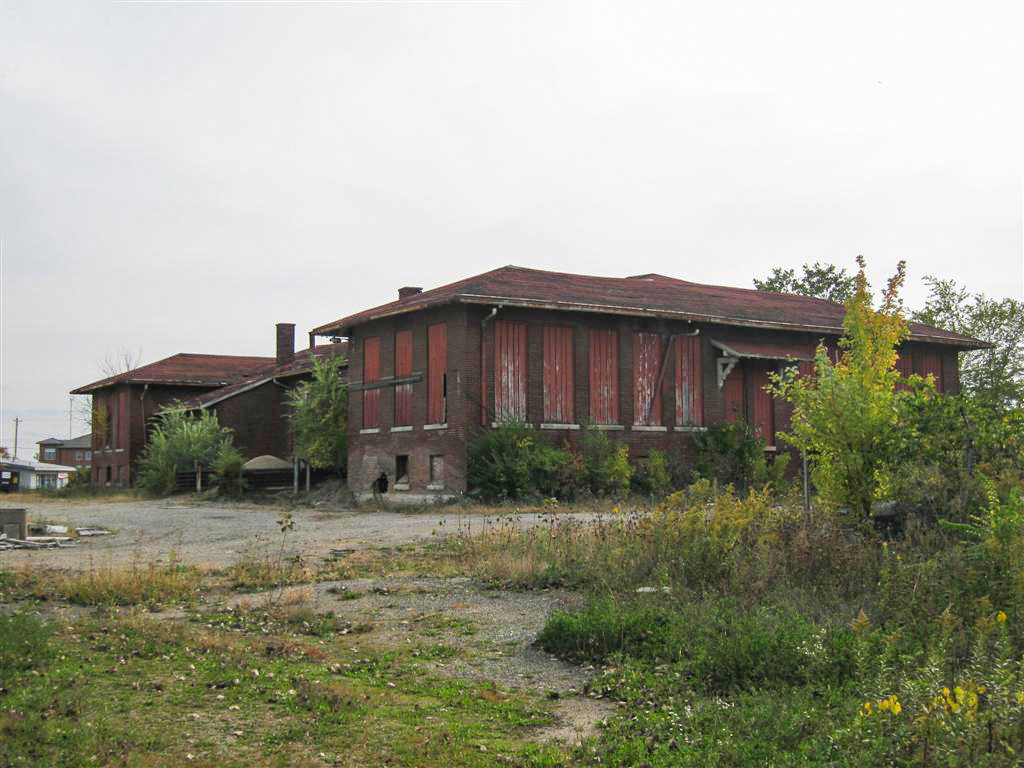
Lane Avenue School

- Barrett Middle School (1900-2006) - Original South High School building (Named for South's first principal Charles S. Barrett)
- Barnett School - closed 1977
- Beaumont Elementary School, now Columbus Spanish Immersion Academy
- Beck Urban Academy Elementary School, now the South Columbus Preparatory Academy
- Bellows Avenue School - closed 1982
- Brentnell Alternative Elementary - now the Ohio Dominican University's Charles School
- Broadview School
- Brookhaven High School - closed May 2014
- Calumet School - closed as a Columbus City School, however is now a private Christian school
- Central High School (1924-1982) - Current site of COSI. The original Central High School was built in 1862 and located at 303 East Broad Street. It was the first school in Columbus built specifically only as a high school. Its name was changed in 1911 to the High School of Commerce. It closed as a school in 1924, but was used for office space until 1928 when it was demolished.
- Chicago Avenue School
- Clarfield Elementary School
- Clinton Middle School
- Courtright Elementary School
- Crestview Middle School - now Indianola Informal K-8 School

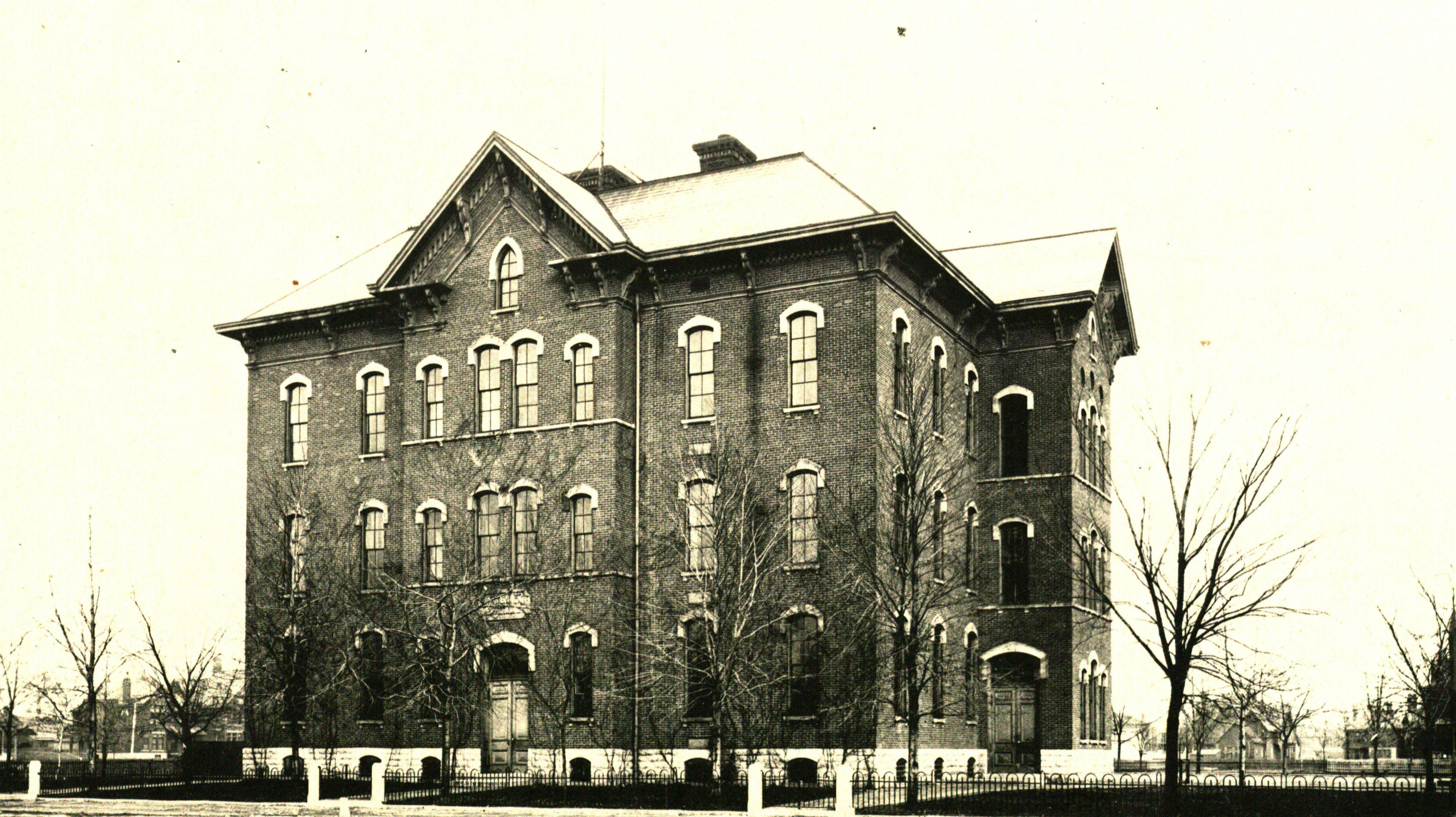
Douglas School

- Douglas School
- Eastwood Elementary School

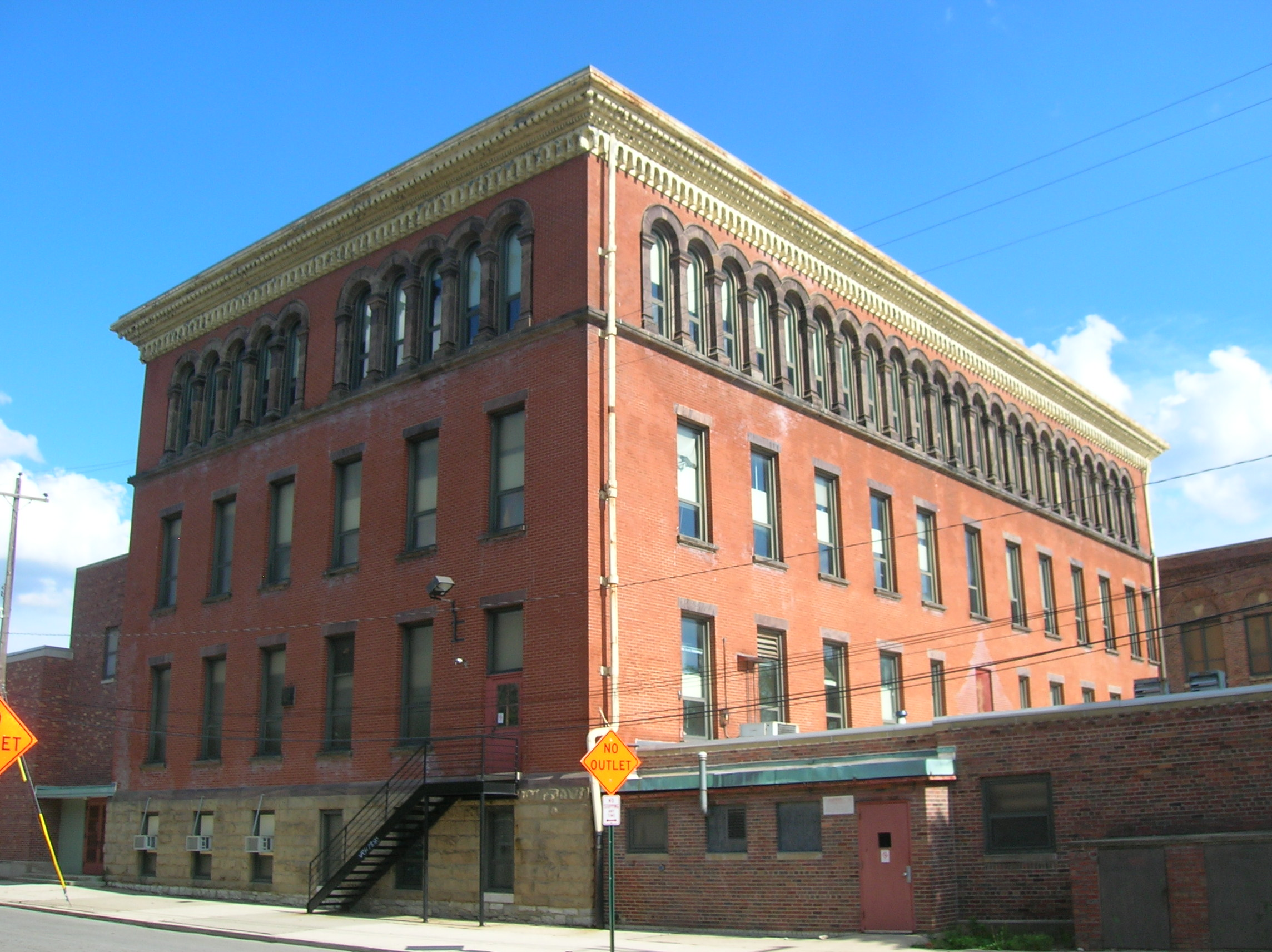
Columbus Gifted Academy

- Everett Middle School - Dennison and Fourth, starting in 1924. It was the original North High School before that. Thereafter, it was home to Arts Impact Middle School for 17 years before Columbus Gifted Academy took over.
- Fair Avenue Elementary School
- Felton School
- Fifth Avenue Public School
- First Avenue School
- Franklin Alternative Middle School. 1390 Franklin (now Bryden) Road. Formerly Franklin Junior High School, starting in 1923. It was the original East High School before that.
- Franklinton Elementary School - Built in 1888 at 666 West Broad Street. It was built on the site of the old Franklin County Courthouse, which had been built in 1809. It was demolished in 1959 to make way for the freeway.
- Gladstone School
- Glenmont School
- Hamilton School
- Hudson Elementary School
- Indianola Junior High School, later known as Indianola Alternative Elementary School, and the first junior high school in the US.
  - First building, now Graham Expeditionary Middle School
  - Second building, now part of Metro Schools
- James Road Elementary School
- Kent Elementary School
- Kingswood School
- Koebel Elementary School
- Lane Avenue School
- Leonard Avenue School
- Linden Park Alternative Elementary - closed 2007
- Linmoor Middle School - closed 2007
- Main Street Elementary School
- Marburn Elementary School
- McGuffey Elementary School

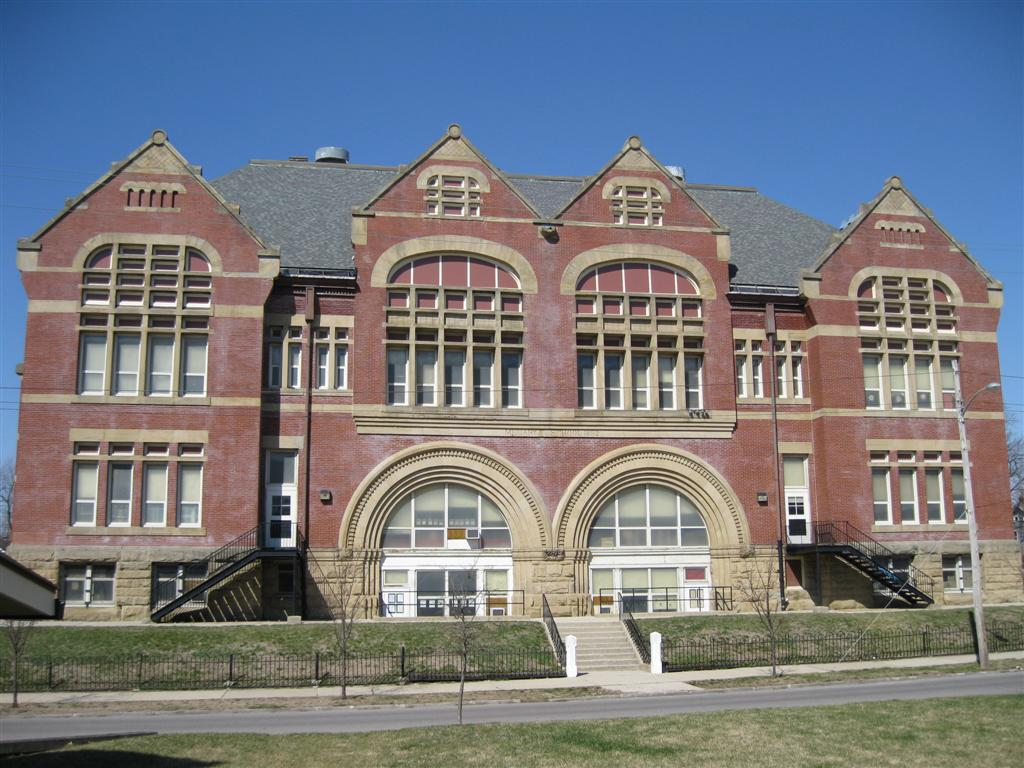
Medary Avenue Elementary School

- Medary Avenue Elementary School - closed 2007
- Michigan Avenue School
- Milo Public School (1894-1977)
- Mohawk Junior Senior High School
- Monroe Traditional Alternative Middle School
- Neil Avenue School (Open Air School)
- Ninth Avenue School
- North High School (1924-1979) - now houses Dominion Middle School
- Northridge School
- Northwood Avenue School
- Pilgrim Elementary School
- Pinecrest Elementary School
- Reeb Avenue Elementary School
- Scioto Trail Elementary School
- Sharon School
- Stockbridge Elementary School
- Third Street School

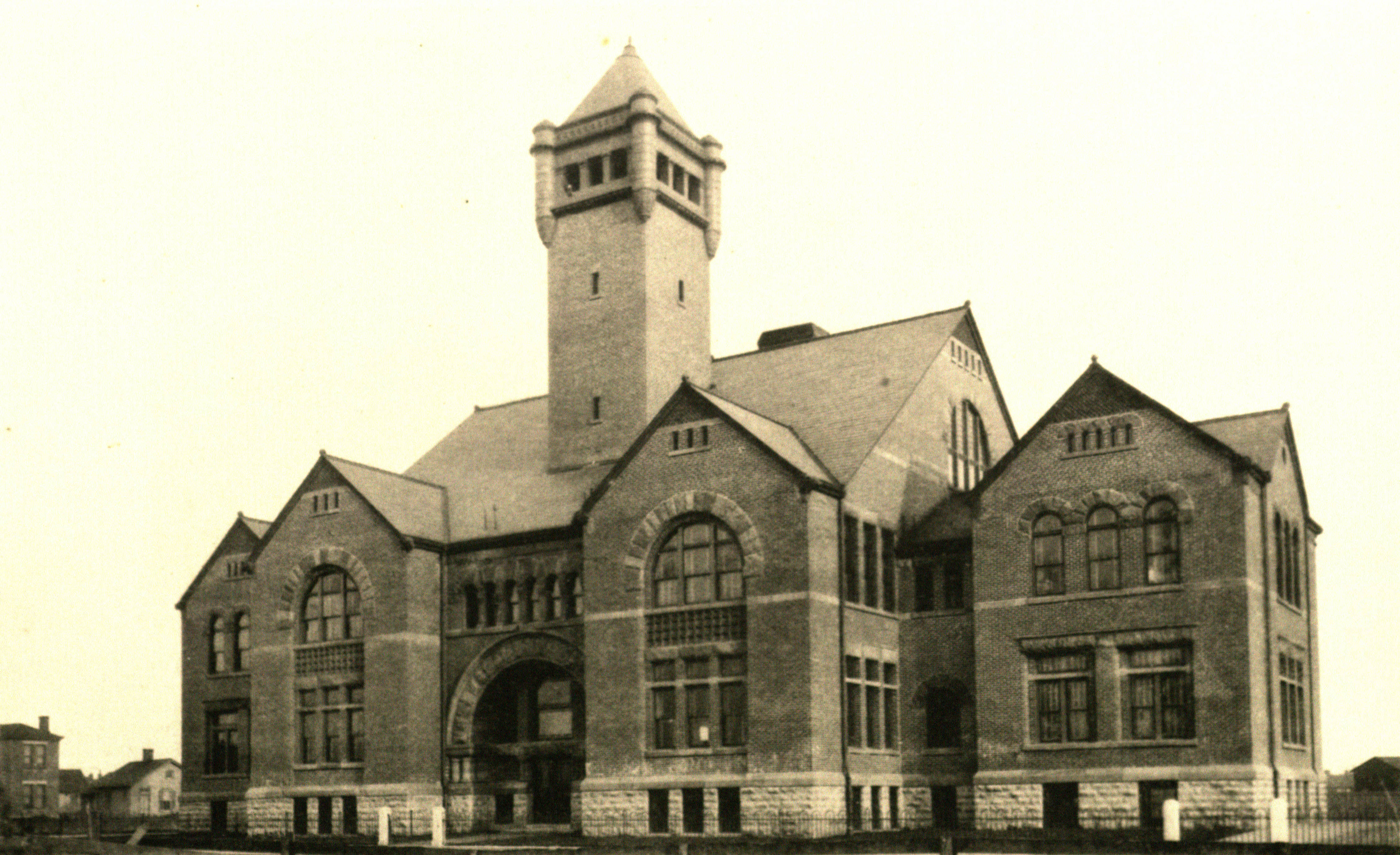
Twenty-Third Street School

- Twenty-Third Street School
- Walford Elementary

== 2021-2022 Report Card ==
The Ohio Department of Education adopted a new 5-star rating system for the 21-22 Ohio School Report Card system. After a hiatus during the COVID-19 pandemic, school districts received scores for the first time since the 2018-2019 school year. Although Columbus City Schools' "Graduation" ("the four-year adjusted cohort graduation rate and the five-year adjusted cohort graduation rate") and "Early Literacy" ("measure of reading improvement and proficiency for students in kindergarten through third grade") were rated at 1/5 stars, the district's "Progress" ("growth all students are making based on their past performances") and "Gap Closing" ("the reduction in educational gaps for student subgroups") were rated at 3/5 stars. The district also scored 2/5 stars in "Achievement" ("whether student performance on state tests met established thresholds and how well students performed on tests overall"), with all selectable grade level data falling short of those similar districts and the state of Ohio. Looking at "Gap Closing" data, the most growth occurred in English Language Arts.

== See also ==
- Columbus Public School Library
