= Centennial High School (Ohio) =

Public, coeducational high school in Columbus, Ohio, United States

Location
- 1441 Bethel Road; Columbus, (Franklin County), Ohio 43220; United States; 40°3′42″N 83°3′28″W

Information
- Type: Public, Coeducational high school
- Established: 1976
- School district: Columbus City Schools
- Superintendent: Angela Chapman
- Principal: Stephanie Porta
- Grades: 9-12
- Campus: Suburban
- Colors: Red, White
- Athletics conference: Columbus City League
- Mascot: Stars
- Team name: Stars
- Rival: Whetstone High School
- Accreditation: North Central Association of Colleges and Schools

Centennial High School is a public high school located on the northwest side of Columbus, Ohio, in the United States. It is a part of Columbus City Schools. The school opened in 1976, initially only housing new students in 10th grade. The smaller start allowed the school to get set up properly, and was designed as such so it wouldn't cause inconvenience to upperclassmen who were attending other high schools but lived in Centennial's newly formed attendance area.

== History ==
At the time the school was built, the surrounding area of Northwest Columbus was experiencing tremendous growth. The need for a new school became apparent as nearby Whetstone High School had become very crowded. A considerable portion of the land around the school was undeveloped at the time of opening, but was rapidly built up in the ensuing years. A rivalry has developed between Centennial and Whetstone due to the splitting of Whetstone's district and the fact that many students in both buildings attended lower grades together. As the building opened in the year of the United States Bicentennial, the building was so named as a patriotic gesture, as was Independence High School, which opened at the same time.

At the time of the school's construction, trends in K-12 schooling were moving towards more non-traditional classroom setups. This manifested itself in the architecture and design of the building. When the school opened, there were no walls between almost all of the classrooms (save for the art, music, and science rooms). Rather, movable dividers were employed in a setup similar to what might be found in an office with cubicles. Additionally, both floors of the building were laid out with wings centered around a common area, rather than long and straight corridors. All of these elements were designed to increase interaction between classrooms and promote learning. Additionally, the lockers were formerly painted a bright orange color, which was thought to have a positive psychological effect for learning.

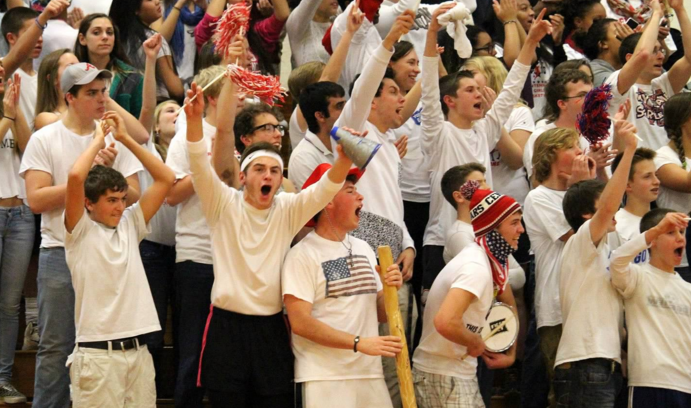
"The Galaxy" student section cheering on their basketball team at home.

In 1997, the school was threatened with closure, as it was stated by the Columbus school board that the building was operating far below capacity with approximately 550 students. This provoked a large public outcry, and it was later discovered that the capacity of 900 students as originally assumed was overstated. It was revised downward to approximately 750 pupils, but in recent years the school has had approximately 850 students attending due to its good reputation.

== Design ==
With the 1973 oil crisis weighing on the minds of the designers, energy efficiency was a top priority in the design of the building. Because of this, the school has very few windows, and the few windows that do exist are found in only a handful of classrooms. However, one benefit of this is that most classrooms need not evacuate to another location in the event of a tornado. For a school that was designed to hold approximately 800-900 students, the auditorium is especially small, seating only 250 people. In the original design, an indoor swimming pool was to be added in a wing on the north side of the building. Although the area was excavated for a pool, it became the vocal music room instead when costs needed to be scaled back. It is especially unusual in that one must walk downstairs to get to it in a building which otherwise has no publicly accessible basement. With the exception of the aforementioned vocal music room, the entire building is fully wheelchair accessible, despite having been built 15 years before the Americans with Disabilities Act came into force. An outdoor amphitheater was integrated into the facade of the building, but it was remodeled into an outdoor classroom after needs for more space in recent years.

After a few years, it was decided that the hassle of dealing with noise transmission between classrooms wasn't worth the positive effects of collaboration. Walls were built to divide the classrooms in 1980, and remain today. Because the school was designed to be open, adding walls where needed has the unintentional effect of making the building especially difficult to navigate. It is easy to spot the walls that were subsequently added, as all the permanent walls in the building as originally built are concrete block, while those added later are made of drywall. Additionally, to cut costs, the ceiling tiles and grid were not rebuilt to accommodate the new walls, which makes for a small gap at the top and reduces noise insulation. Some of the lockers were painted a neutral beige color, while others were painted dark blue (one of the school colors). With the Columbus City Schools switch to Middle schools from the Junior High setup, 9th graders began to be admitted in the fall of 1980.

== Academics ==
U.S. News & World Report ranked Centennial among the top high schools in the country, giving it a silver award. Additionally, the school has consistently received a score of "Excellent" from the Ohio Department of Education, the highest mark given. The high performance is made more remarkable by the fact that approximately 60% of students fall into the "economically disadvantaged" category, and 15% have limited English proficiency. Racially, the school is quite balanced, with no group being in the majority. Approximately 39% of students are African-American, 50% are Caucasian, and 11% from other groups such as Asian and Hispanic. These categories do not readily display the diversity present at the school, as there are many students from Eastern Europe, the Middle East, and the Horn of Africa who attend Centennial. Although situated in a prosperous area of Columbus, the boundaries for attending stretch along a narrow corridor towards the south which encompasses a variety of neighborhoods and socioeconomic statuses. The attendance area is bordered by Upper Arlington to the west, Grandview and Victorian Village to the south, Whetstone High School's attendance area to the east, and Worthington to the north.

== Sports ==
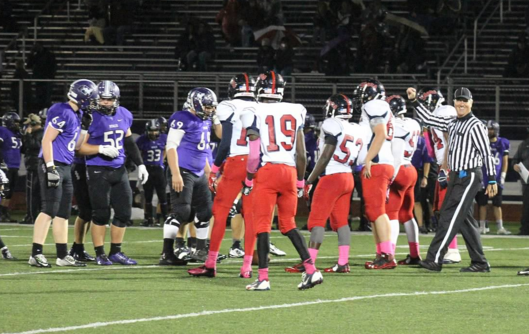
The Centennial football team playing at Desales High School.

Centennial's sports teams include Football, Basketball, Volleyball, Soccer, Baseball, Golf, Wrestling, Softball, Swimming, Track, Cross Country, Cheerleading, Bowling, Lacrosse, and Tennis. The football stadium includes a 400 meter track in addition to a natural grass field. Other facilities include three baseball/softball fields, however only two are used on a regular basis due to the third field's proximity to busy Bethel road and the risks foul balls would cause. Like most other Columbus High Schools (except for Walnut Ridge), Centennial has three tennis courts, although room was provided for a full five (which makes matches go much more quickly). The adjacent area remains an open field with trees at the edge. The school colors are red, white and blue. The school mascot is a Star.

== Battle For The Olentangy ==
Due to the proximity of the two schools (2.5 miles), Centennial and Whetsone have a very intense sports rivalry. Every football season, in the last week, the two teams take part in the battle for the Olentangy, named after the Olentangy River that separates the two schools.

Ohio High School Athletic Association State Championships

- Boys Golf – 1978

City Championships

- Boys Swimming - 2010, 2019
- Girls Soccer unofficial city champions - 2009 official city champions - 2011, 2017, 2018
- Boys Golf - 2007, 2024
- Cross Country - 2007, 2008, 2018
- Girls Volleyball - 2004-2007, 2026
- Softball- 2008
- Boys Tennis - 2009
- Boys Baseball - 1981, 1987, 2002, 2007, 2010, 2011
- Girls Basketball 2024, 2025
