= Downtown High School (Columbus, Ohio) =

Columbus Downtown High School
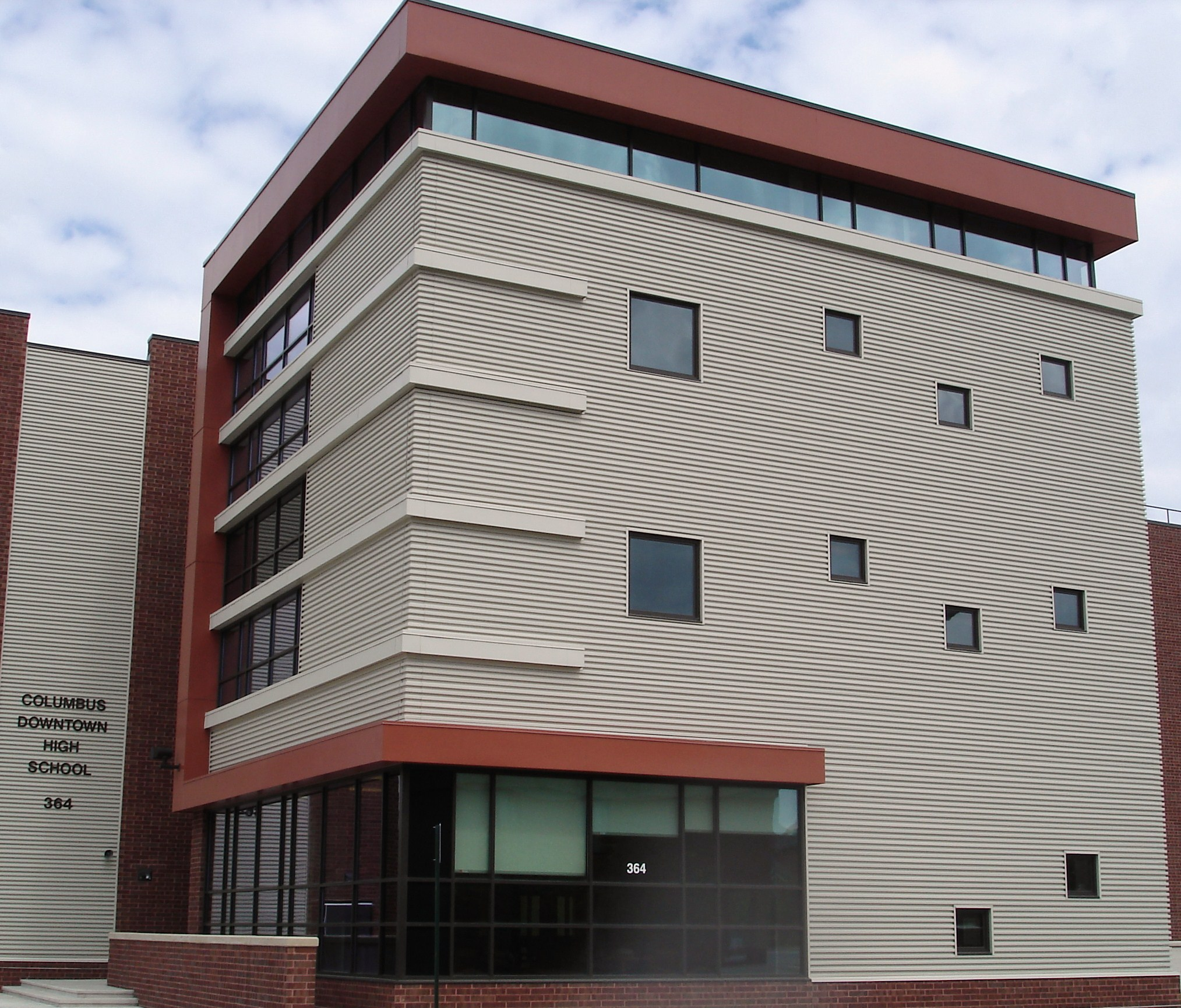

Location
- 364 South 4th Street; Columbus, Ohio 43215; United States
- 39°57′18″N 82°59′40″W

Information
- Type: Public, Coeducational, Vocational high school
- Established: 2009
- School district: Columbus City Schools
- Superintendent: Angela Chapman
- Director: Cheryl Willis
- Teaching staff: 33.00 (FTE)
- Grades: 11–12
- Student to teacher ratio: 1.58
- Colors: Green, Black and White

Columbus Downtown High School is a public high school and vocational school located in Downtown Columbus, Ohio. It is a part of Columbus City Schools. It was built to consolidate, along with the existing Fort Hayes Career Center, three closing career centers (Northeast Career Center, Northwest Career Center, & Southeast Career Center) in the Columbus City Schools district. While a career center, it also functions as a high school with a capacity of 800 students.

Construction on the school was completed in December 2008. The first classes were held on January 5, 2009 with 200 students.

== Programs ==
Columbus Downtown High School provides the following career paths for students:

- Business and Entrepreneurship
- Financial Services
- Information Technology
- Interactive Multimedia
- Computer Programming
- Law Enforcement
- Criminal Justice
- Cosmetology
- Culinary Arts
- Teaching Academy
- Early Childhood Education
- Engineering Design
- Industrial Technology
- Manufacturing Operations
