= Whetstone High School =

Public, coeducational high school in Columbus, Ohio, United States

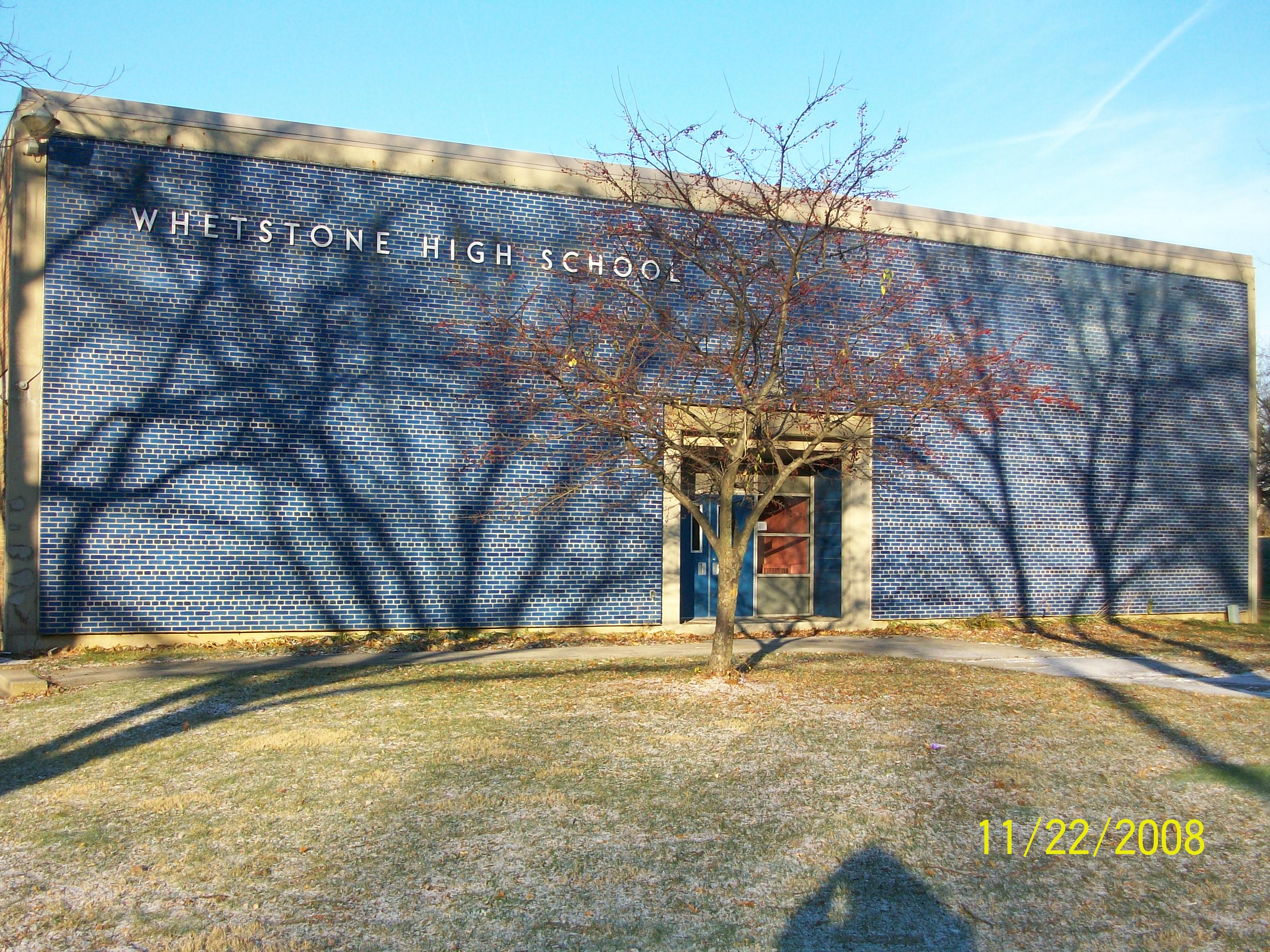

Location
- 4405 Scenic Drive; Columbus, (Franklin County), Ohio 43214; United States; 40°3′3″N 83°1′47″W

Information
- Type: Public, Coeducational high school
- Opened: 1961
- School district: Columbus City Schools
- Superintendent: Dr. Angela Chapman
- Principal: Kimberly Rodriguez
- Teaching staff: 51.00 (FTE)
- Grades: 9-12
- Student to teacher ratio: 19.29
- Colors: Navy and White
- Fight song: Navy Blue and White
- Athletics conference: Columbus City League
- Mascot: Brave
- Team name: Braves
- Rival: Centennial Stars
- Accreditation: North Central Association of Colleges and Schools
- Newspaper: The Braves Messenger
- Yearbook: Legend
- Feeder schools: Dominion Middle School
- Website: School website

Whetstone High School is a public high school located at 4405 Scenic Drive in Columbus, Ohio. It is a part of Columbus City Schools and the neighborhood of Clintonville. Whetstone's mascot is the Brave. The school opened in 1961 to accommodate the overflow from North High School. The expanding student base brought on by growth in north Columbus created the need for an additional school.

== Curriculum ==
Grades for all subjects taken at Whetstone HS are included in the computation of a student's Grade Point Average (GPA). Middle School courses which were taken for high school credit are also included. Only Advanced Placement and Post-Secondary courses are weighted. If a subject is repeated, only the higher grade is used. For G.P.A. purposes, A=4: B=3: C=2: D=1: F=0 points. For weighted courses, A=5: B=4: C=3: D=1: F=0.

On average, approximately 65% of Whetstone HS graduates enter either a four-year college/university, a two-year institution, or a technical program. Approximately 50% of graduates acquire the CCS Certificate of College Preparation and 30% receive the Certificate of Specialization.

In 2010, Whetstone received a bronze medal from U.S. News & World Report magazine as one of the nation's top high schools.

== Extracurricular Activities ==
Arts and Music: Art Club, Chorus - Mixed, Concert Band - Beginning & Advanced, Drama Club, Handbells, Jazz Band, Keyboarding, Marching band, String Ensemble, Theater - Fall Play, Theater - Spring Play or Musical, Vocal Ensemble, Yearbook.

Athletics: Baseball - boys, Basketball - girls & boys, Bowling - girls & boys, Cross country running- girls & boys, Football - boys, Golf - coed, Soccer - girls & boys, Softball - girls, Swim & Dive - girls & boys, Tennis - girls & boys, Track & Field - girls & boys, Volleyball - girls & boys, Wrestling - girls & boys.

Other Clubs & Activities: Cheerleading, Chess Team, Creative Writing, Drill Team, Environmental Club, Gay Straight Alliance, National History Day, International Club, In-The-Know (Quiz Bowl) (Academic Challenge), Love is Louder, Mock Trial, National Honor Society, Newspaper - "The Braves Messenger" (formerly "Mocassin Tracks"), Poetry Slam, FIRST Robotics Competition, Senior Council, Student Council, Young Volunteers.

== Marching Band ==
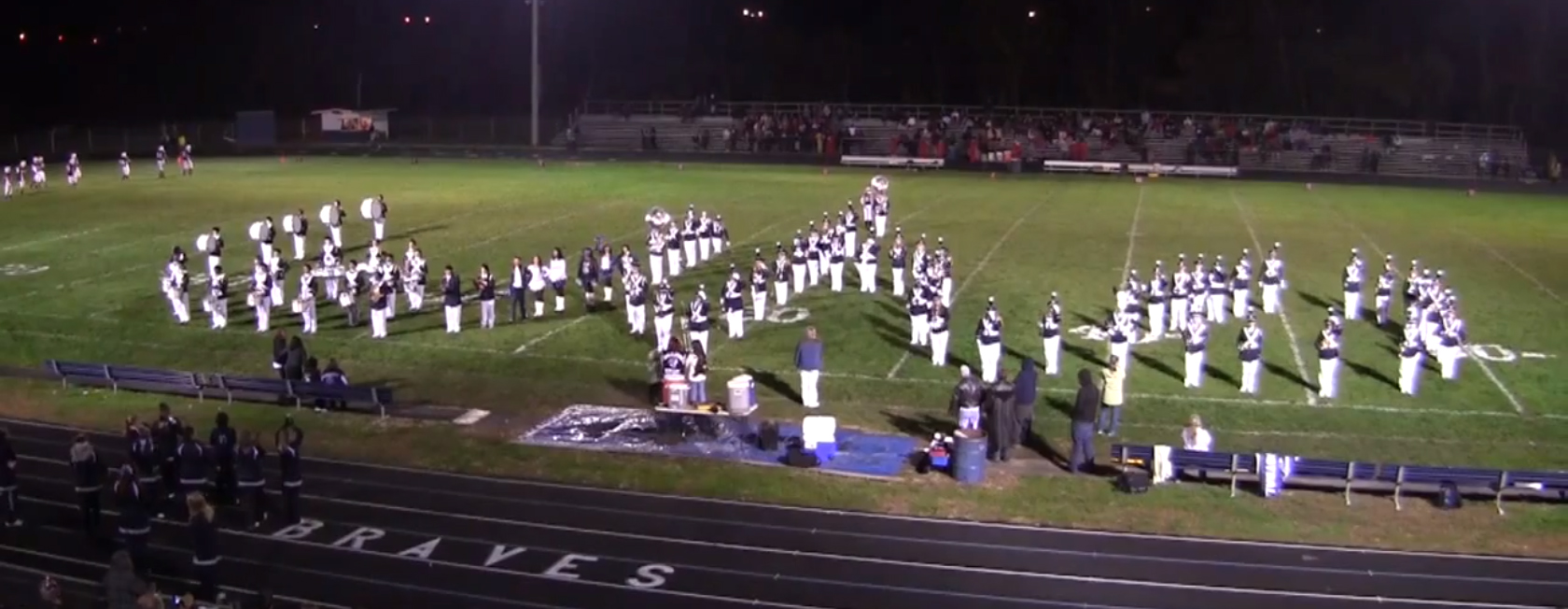
The Whetstone High School Marching Band performing "Script Whs"

The stylings of the Whetstone High School Marching Band can be traced back to The Ohio State University Marching Band through uniform and showmanship. The WHSMB uniform is based on the OSUMB's uniform, which is heavily influenced by the 1920s U.S Army ROTC uniform. Whetstone's ramp entrance is based on the OSUMB's traditional entrance into Ohio Stadium. The WHSMB drum major also styles themselves off of the drum majors of OSU with the signature, "Back Bend" and jabs down the field. At each homecoming game, the WHSMB performs its signature "Script WHS", which is derived from "Script Ohio" and is performed to the final section of Edwin Eugene Bagley's National Emblem march.

The school has two fight songs: "Navy Blue and White" and "Polar Pep", the latter of which was originally the fight song for the now closed North High School.

== Notable alumni ==
- Andrew Ginther, Mayor of Columbus, Ohio
- Jennifer Brunner, former Ohio Secretary of State
- Tom Carper (class of 1964), a United States senator from Delaware
- Beverly D'Angelo (class of 1969), actor
- Alex Grey (Velzy) (class of 1971), artist
- John V. Richardson, Jr. (class of 1967), UCLA professor, dean in the UCLA Graduate Division (2002–2007), and editor of The Library Quarterly from 1995 to 2003
- Akwasi Owusu-Ansah (class of 2006), football player on the Oakland Raiders
- Asia Taylor, WNBA player with the Washington Mystics

== See also ==
- Schools in Columbus, Ohio
