= Metro Early College High School =

The Metro School

Location
- Columbus, Ohio, (Franklin County) 43201; United States; 40.0038°N 82.9971°W

Information
- Type: Public, Coeducational High school
- Motto: Four houses, one Metro.
- Opened: 2006 (high school); 2014 (middle school)
- Founder: Battelle, Ohio State University
- Status: Open
- School district: Metro Schools
- Superintendent: Meka Pace
- Dean: Cory Neugebauer
- Principal: Marcy Raymond - Executive Director/Founder - Highschool (2006-2012) Aimee Kennedy - Highschool (2012-2013) Meka Pace (2013-2016) (Past) Anthony Alston - Highschool (past) Claire Anthony - Middle School (Past) Krista Miller - Highschool (Current) Benjamin McKibben - Highschool (Current) Marc Sterner - Middle School
- Head of school: Marc Sterner
- Executive Director: Meka Pace
- Grades: K-12
- Enrollment: 884 (2023-2024)
- Average class size: 27-30 students
- Education system: Mastery System
- Campus type: Urban
- Houses: Altruismo, Amistad, Isibindi, Reveur
- Colors: Red, Blue, Green and Black
- Athletics: Drone Soccer, (middle and high school) Metro Bots (High School)
- Mascot: The Bald man (as decided by the drone soccer team)
- National ranking: Bronze
- School fees: $100 (iPad Fee)
- Affiliation: Ohio State University
- Website: www.themetroschool.org

The Metro Early College High School is a public, non-charter high school located in Columbus, Ohio; on the campus of Ohio State University. It is also a part of the Metro Schools, along with the Metro Middle School. The Metro Institute of Technology (M.I.T.) was another branch of the school, but was closed in 2017.

== Educational Standards ==
Because of the nature of Metro, all credits are awarded using a mastery-based grading scale. Mastery is achieved by holding a 90% or higher on (depending on the course) specific mastery assignments and tests, the entire course as an average, or every single assignment given in the course. Anything below mastery is called a WIP, or work-in-progress.

Students not meeting the 90% benchmark in a mastery assignment are able to remediate and retake the assignment. Difficulties to do so depend on the teacher. In the case that the grade average does not meet the 90% benchmark and the student can no longer remediate mastery assignments, they are required to either remediate the course during J-Term or Summer School or retake the entire course the next semester. Grades of classes retaken replace the former grade, so when colleges look at student transcripts, they only see the most recent grade and do not know about the former WIP (Work-in-Progress) grade.

== Basics ==
The Metro High School is operated by the Educational Council, a confederation of the 16 public school districts in Franklin County under Metro founder, Marcy Raymond. Their mascot is monarchs. Students attending Metro are concurrently enrolled in their home district and remain a part of the public school system in Franklin County. This means that the students of Metro are able to participate in events at their home high school while still completing coursework at the Metro school.

The Metro Institute of Technology (MIT) was the sister school of MECHS. MIT was formed in 2015 as a technology focused STEM school, and as a way to host Metro's 5-year program. It shared campus with Franklin University on the upper and lower floor of Phillips Hall. It closed in 2017.

MIT shared many of the same educational goals and procedures as MECHS, but was focused in the five year College Credit Plus program. As of 2016, this distinction was lost when MECHS implemented this same program into the main school. Both MECHS and MIT were also technology centric, making both schools extremely similar. After MIT closed its doors in 2017, all students had the option to switch to MECHS.

Starting with the 2011–2012 school year, Metro received an Early College High School exemption from College Credit Plus, allowing for more flexibility and class options. Both the Middle and High School have J-Term, a chance for students who have passed the mastery system to participate in their choice of elective classes for two weeks, while students who don't have their work at 90% or higher work on fixing their grades.

== Capacity ==
Metro currently enrolls 100 students as freshmen per year of operation, with a maximum total attendance of 400 students at any one time. Due to students from Metro Middle School transferring into the high school, Metro only enrolls about 30-60 new students a year.

== Governance ==
The Educational Services Center of Central Ohio operates Metro High School and manages the school's finances. The Metro Partnership Group advises and assists the school staff on the program, school evaluation and research, professional development, funding and community relations. Seven members serve in the Metro Partnership Group, including three from Ohio State University, three from the Educational Council and one from Battelle. Metro's principal and staff oversee the day-to-day operation of the school.

== Funding ==
Metro High School has received significant support from Battelle, Ohio State University and Coalition of Essential Schools National to design and open the school. Recurrent funding comes from districts whose students attend the school and from the state of Ohio.
