= Akwasi Owusu-Ansah =

American football player (born 1988)

No. 27, 11, 41, 47
- Position: Cornerback

Personal information
- Born: April 10, 1988 (age 38); Gainesville, Florida, U.S.
- Listed height: 6 ft 0 in (1.83 m)
- Listed weight: 210 lb (95 kg)

Career information
- High school: Whetstone (Columbus, Ohio)
- College: IUP
- NFL draft: 2010: 4th round, 126th overall pick

Career history
- Dallas Cowboys (2010−2011); Jacksonville Jaguars (2011); Dallas Cowboys (2012)*; Oakland Raiders (2012–2013)*; New Orleans Saints (2013)*; Detroit Lions (2013); Toronto Argonauts (2015–2017)
- * Offseason or practice squad member only

Awards and highlights
- Grey Cup champion (2017); Division II All-American (2009); Second-team Division II All-American (2008); 2× All-PSAC (2008, 2009)

Career NFL statistics
- Games played: 15
- Total tackles: 22
- Stats at Pro Football Reference
- Stats at CFL.ca

Akwasi Owusu-Ansah (/əˈkwɑːsi oʊˈwuːsuː ˈɑːnsɑː/ ə-KWAH-see oh-WOO-soo AHN-sah; born April 10, 1988) is an American former professional football player who was a cornerback in the National Football League (NFL) for the Dallas Cowboys, Jacksonville Jaguars, and Detroit Lions. He also played for the Toronto Argonauts in the Canadian Football League (CFL). He was selected in the fourth round of the 2010 NFL draft by the Cowboys. He played college football for the IUP Crimson Hawks.

== Early life ==
Owusu-Ansah's family comes from Ghana. He attended Whetstone High School in Columbus, Ohio and graduated in 2006.

He left as the school's career leading rusher for yards and touchdowns. He also helped Whetstone to their first back-to-back winning seasons in over 10 years, while receiving All-Ohio Honorable Mention honors as a senior. He also played basketball and ran track.

== College career ==
Owusu-Ansah played college football for the IUP Crimson Hawks of NCAA Division II. He became a starter as a junior, when he registered eight interceptions, including seven in the last four games, and three against Gannon University. Prior to his senior season in 2009 he was ranked as the ninth-best cornerback in the nation, and the only non-Division I player in the top 18. During his senior season, he returned three punts and two kickoffs for touchdowns and ranked in the top 15 nationally for kick and punt return average yards. He set school records for punt return yards and average and kickoff return yards.

He was selected for the 2010 East-West Shrine Game, but could not participate due to a shoulder injury suffered during his senior season. He later underwent surgery performed by James Bradley, team doctor of the Pittsburgh Steelers, in March 2010. Just before the surgery, Owusu-Ansah participated in the Pro Day workout at Ohio State University, where he recorded the fastest 40-yard dash time. Following his senior season, he was selected first-team All-American by the American Football Coaches Association, second-team by the Associated Press and first-team All-PSAC for defense and special teams.

Upon being drafted, he was the seventh player selected from IUP, and the third-highest selection for the school after Jim Haslett in 1979 and Leander Jordan in 2000. He is a member of Omega Psi Phi fraternity, Gamma Mu chapter. He is frequently referred to as "Kwasi".

== Professional career ==
=== Dallas Cowboys (first stint) ===
Although he was considered to be inexperienced coming from a small school background and was also recovering from a shoulder injury he suffered as a senior, Owusu-Ansah was selected by the Dallas Cowboys in the fourth round (126th overall) of the 2010 NFL draft, because of his athletic measurables. In the process, the team passed on other defensive backs like Kam Chancellor, Kendrick Lewis, Nolan Carroll, Sherrick McManis and Reshad Jones. On July 19, he agreed to a four-year contract worth $2.24 million with the Cowboys.

As a rookie, he was moved between the safety and cornerback position, earning the job as the team's primary kickoff returner. He was placed on the injured reserve list on November 10, with an ankle injury, after playing in 7 games.

On September 3, 2011, Owusu-Ansah was released. He cleared waivers and signed to the practice squad on September 4. During the 2011 NFL season, the Cowboys started playing him at wide receiver in addition to safety. He was waived from the team on November 29.

=== Jacksonville Jaguars ===
On December 4, 2011, the Jacksonville Jaguars signed Owusu-Ansah to their practice squad. He was promoted to the active roster on December 6, after the Jaguars released tight end Fendi Onobun. He played in 4 games with 2 starts. He was released on May 7, 2012.

=== Dallas Cowboys (second stint) ===
The Cowboys claimed Owusu-Ansah off waivers on May 8, 2012. He was released during the final roster cuts on August 31.

=== Oakland Raiders ===
On September 19, 2012, he was signed to the Oakland Raiders practice squad. He was re-signed and released from the practice two additional times, until being waived on May 13, 2013.

=== New Orleans Saints ===
On July 23, 2013, Owusu-Ansah signed with the New Orleans Saints. He was cut on August 27.

=== Detroit Lions ===
On December 2, 2013, he was signed to the Detroit Lions practice squad. He was promoted to the active roster on December 27. He was released on May 12, 2014.

=== Los Angeles KISS ===
On December 23, 2014, he was assigned to the Los Angeles KISS of the Arena Football League but refused to report.

=== Toronto Argonauts ===
On May 21, 2015, Owusu-Ansah signed with the Toronto Argonauts of the Canadian Football League (CFL). He was named the starter at cornerback and finished the 2015 season having played in all 18 regular season games. He registered 40 tackles, 4 interceptions (one returned for a touchdown) and 2 special teams tackles in his first year in the CFL.

In 2016, he played in just four games and had 10 tackles, after a pectoral injury ended his season early.

On February 27, 2017, he was re-signed by the Argos. He posted 30 tackles and was a part of the Grey Cup championship team, that had a 27–24 win against the Calgary Stampeders on November 26. He wasn't re-signed after the season.
