= The Metro Schools =

Schools in Columbus, Ohio, United States

The Metro Schools are a semi-public network of three schools located in Columbus, Ohio, United States, on Ohio State University's campus: Metro Early College High School (MECHS), and Metro Middle School (MECMS). The Metro Institute of Technology, the third branch of the school, closed in 2017.

In 2021, it was reported that the school would expand into the former Indianola Junior High School building.
