= Indianola Junior High School =

- U.S. National Register of Historic Places
- Columbus Register of Historic Properties
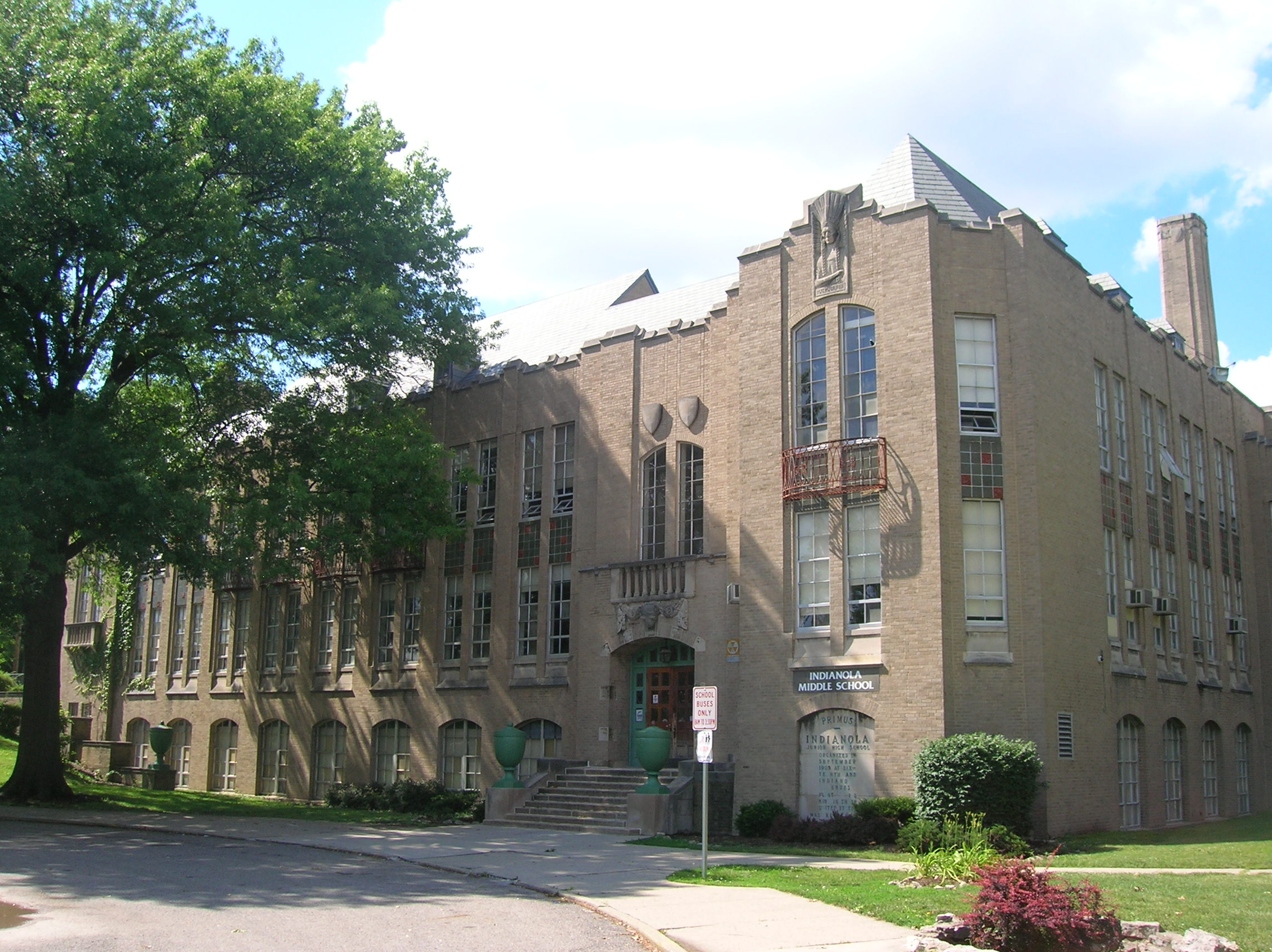
- Entrance to Indianola Junior High School
- Interactive map highlighting the building's location
- Location: 420 E. 19th Ave., Columbus, Ohio
- Coordinates: 40.0038°N 82.9971°W
- Built: 1929
- Architect: Howard Dwight Smith
- NRHP reference No.: 80003000
- CRHP No.: CR-27

Significant dates
- Added to NRHP: June 30, 1980
- Designated CRHP: May 14, 1984

Indianola Junior High School is a historic school building located on 19th Avenue in Columbus, Ohio. The building opened in 1929 after the school moved out of its previous location on 16th Avenue. It was added to the National Register of Historic Places in 1980.

The school, founded at its previous location in 1909, was the first junior high school in the United States.

== Organization and history ==
=== Early history ===
In the early 1900s, there was support for marking more of a transition from elementary to secondary education. The Indianola school was the first school to be designed as a separate junior high school, incorporating what was then the last two years of elementary school with the first years of high school.

The school was organized in 1909 by the Board of Education of Columbus, Ohio, and Superintendent J.A. Shawan. The first principal of Indianola Junior High School was C. H. Fullerton, and the school included students from the Medary, Northwood, and Eight Avenue Schools. Curriculum was designed by Shawan and Ohio State University President William Oxley Thompson and intended to fight the 8th grade dropout rate which was the time that many children left school to begin working and resulting in a 7% graduation rate in the city from high school.

=== New location, 1929 ===
In 1929, the school moved to its present location at 420 E. 19th Ave. The building was designed by Ohio State University architect Howard Dwight Smith who also designed Ohio Stadium. Dr. Erwin Frey, who also sculpted the statue of Dr. William Oxley Thompson which stands outside Ohio State University's Thompson Library, was responsible for the sculpture on the building.

In recognition of Columbus, Ohio,'s role in the early junior high school movement (and the Indianola school's in particular), a tablet was incorporated into the structure of the Indianola Junior High School building which reads:

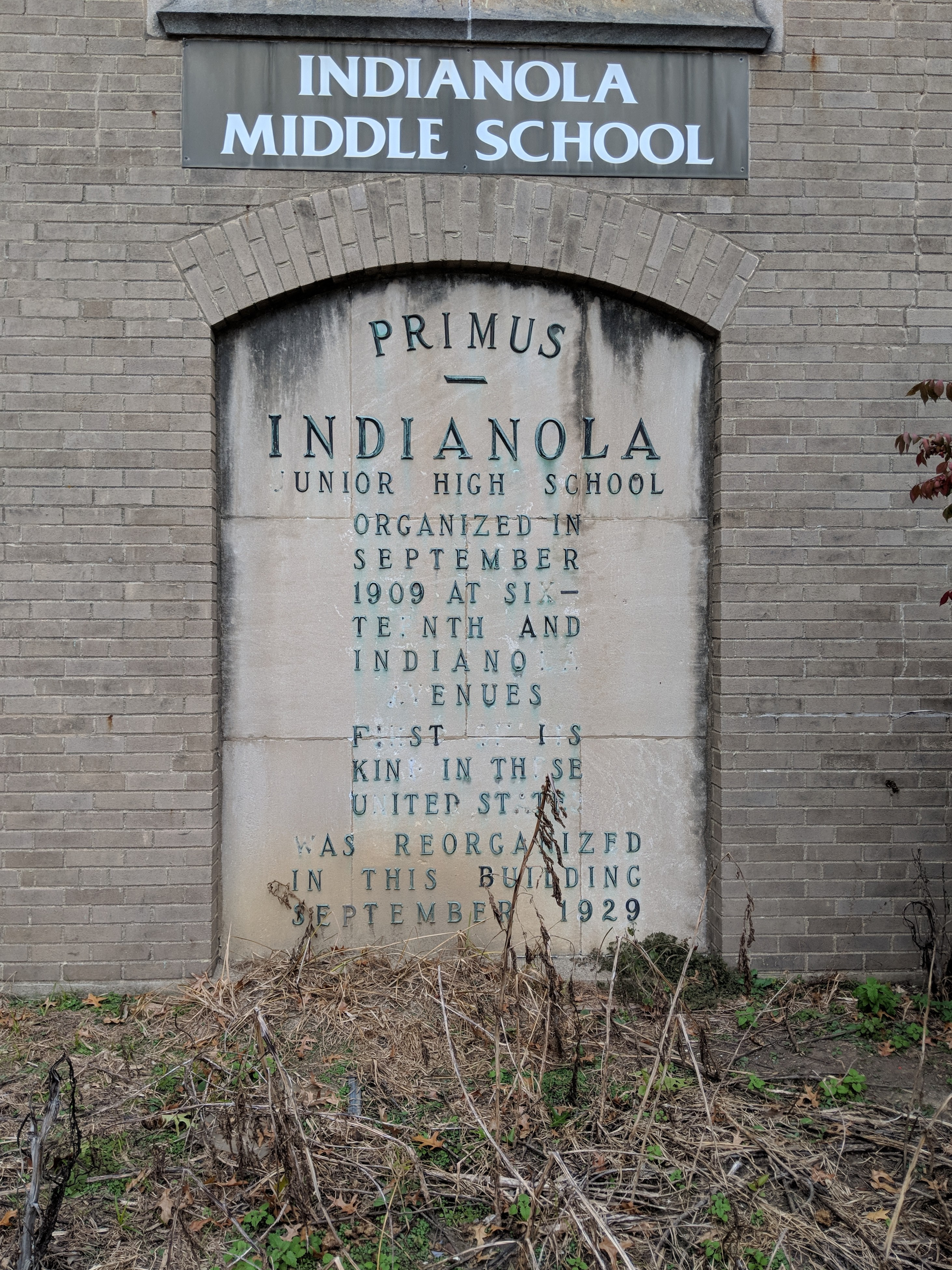
Plaque near the entrance to the school commemorating its founding as "First of its kind in these United States"

Primus

Indianola
Junior High School
organized in September 1909 at Six-
teenth and Indianola Avenues
First of its
kind in these United States
was reorganized in this building
September 1929.

=== Graham Elementary and Middle School ===
Until spring 2007 the building housed the Indianola Alternative Elementary School when students moved to the old Everett Junior High. The building remained vacant until the Graham Expeditionary Middle School opened in 2010.

=== Metro Schools ===
In 2018, Ohio State University purchased the property for $2.35 million in order to save and preserve. In 2021, a local STEM-focused semi-public 6-12 school, The Metro Schools, began planning a move to the building as part of a larger expansion through a partnership with OSU and Battelle. Metro Schools plans to occupy the building in 2025 to expand its school population. The renovations of the building will cost $34 million.

== Architecture ==
Constructed of buff-colored stretcher bond brick, the Art Deco-inspired three-story junior high school features 18 bay walls with light recessed windows and balconies. The building has decorative ornamentation on its facade including a carving of a buffalo head along with carved tiles of animals above the entrance, a Native American chief bas sculpture above the third floor, and terracotta urns, among others.

As of 1980, the interiors incorporated various elements of the original building on 16th Avenue, including oak woodwork and wainscoting. A wood-burning fireplace, ornamental plaster, and arched leaded glass on bookcases were also in place.

== See also ==
- National Register of Historic Places listings in Columbus, Ohio
- Schools in Columbus, Ohio
