= North High School (Columbus, Ohio) =

Columbus North High School
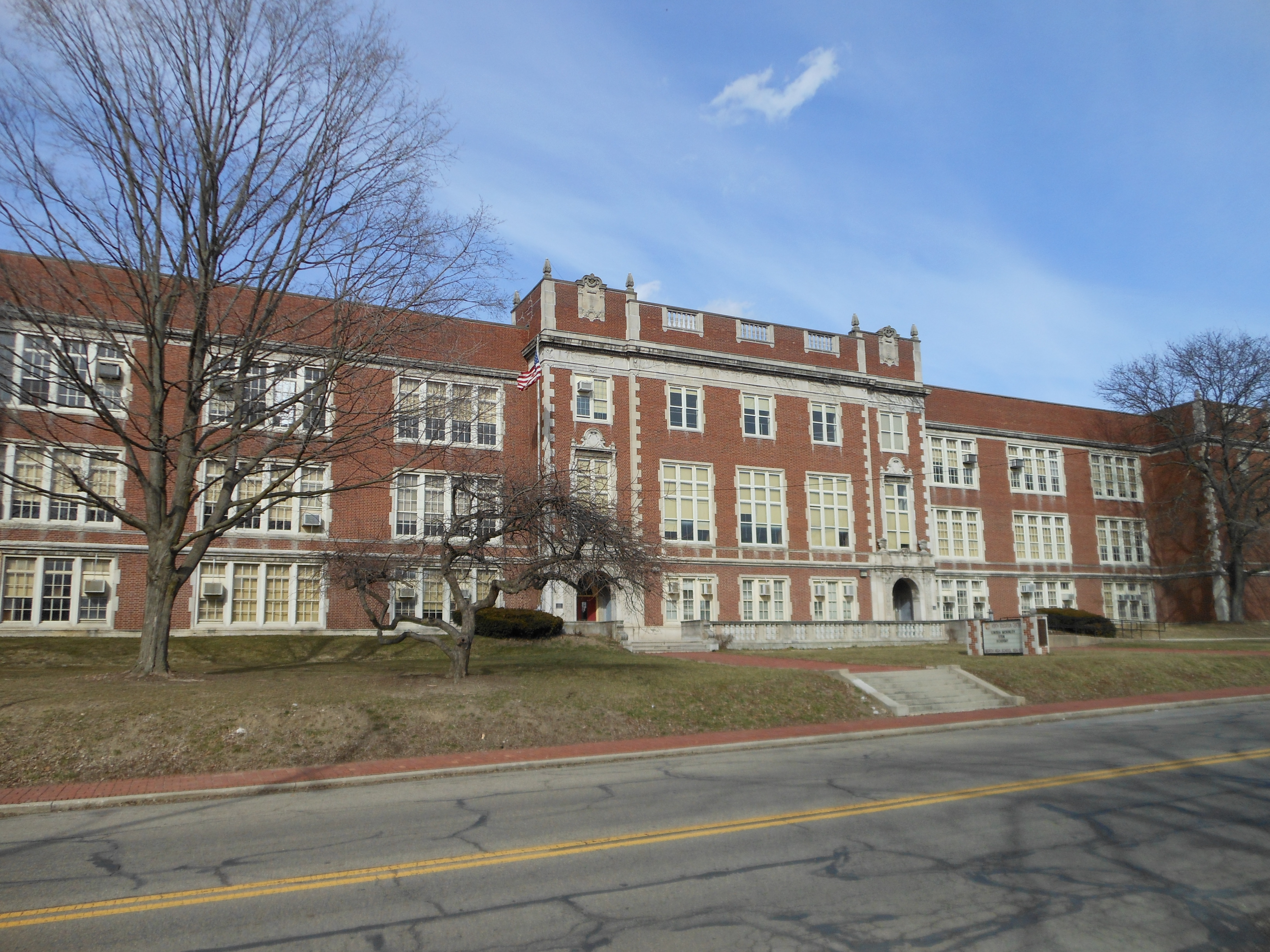

Location
- 100 E. Arcadia Ave. Columbus, Ohio; United States; 40.0183°N 83.0086°W

Information
- Type: Public high school
- Opened: 1924
- Closed: 1979
- School district: Columbus
- Grades: 9-12
- North High School
- U.S. National Register of Historic Places
- Columbus Register of Historic Properties
- Interactive map highlighting the building's location
- Area: 14 acres (5.7 ha)
- Built: 1922
- Architect: Frank Packard
- Architectural style: Tudor Revival, Jacobethan Revival
- NRHP reference No.: 87000984
- CRHP No.: CR-54

Significant dates
- Added to NRHP: July 2, 1987
- Designated CRHP: October 23, 2000

Columbus North High School is a public high school building located on the north side of Columbus, Ohio at 100 E. Arcadia Avenue. It is part of the Columbus City School District. The school was closed in 1979 due to declining enrollment.

In December 1921, the Columbus Board of Education purchased a thirteen-acre tract of land on Arcadia Ave., which included the old Columbus Sewer Pipe Factory, for $39,000. Famed architect, Frank Packard designed the building, of Tudor Revival architecture, costing approximately $1,000,000. Construction began in 1923 and the building opened on September 2, 1924. It graduated its first class in January 1925.

The North High School building served as an adult education center for many years. From 2006-2008 the North building was used as swing space by East High School during the renovation of the East High School building. Linden-McKinley High School used the building as swing space from 2009-2011 during the renovation of the Linden-McKinley building.

From 2012–2019, the North High School building was the home of Columbus North International High School. Columbus North International moved to the former Brookhaven High School building in 2019. The North High School building was renovated, and is now home to Dominion Middle School.

North High School won the first state Ohio High School Athletic Association track and field championship shortly after the formation of the association. The school also had an undefeated football season in 1918 under Coach Errett Selby.

== Athletic state championships ==
- Boys Track and Field – 1908, 1911
- Boys Golf – 1932, 1944, 1945, 1946
- Boys Baseball – 1940
- Boys Gymnastics - 1926, 1927, 1932

== See also ==
- Schools in Columbus, Ohio
