= Howard Dwight Smith =

American architect

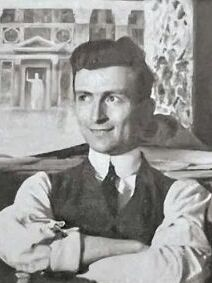
Howard Dwight Smith ca. 1911.

Howard Dwight Smith (February 21, 1886 – April 27, 1958) was an architect most known for his designs of Ohio Stadium (completed in 1922) for which he was awarded the American Institute of Architects Gold Medal for Public Building Design.

== Early life and education ==
Howard Dwight Smith was born in Dayton, Ohio on February 21, 1886, as the third child of Andrew Jackson Smith and Nancy Evaline Moore, and was named after the evangelist Dwight Moody. His father, a Civil War Hundred Days Man, had been a farmer (in Logan County, Ohio and Kansas), a teamster and salesman for a flour milling company (in Dayton), and minor political figure (elected to the Dayton Board of Education).

Smith graduated from Steele High School in Dayton and graduated in 1907 from Ohio State University with a degree in Civil Engineering in Architecture. He studied architecture at Columbia University. In 1909, he worked for one year as an architectural draftsman in the Office of the Supervising Architect in Washington, DC before returning to Columbia to receive his Bachelor of Architecture degree in 1910.

== Career ==
At Columbia, he won the $1,100 Perkins Traveling Fellowship and traveled and studied in Europe for 10 months in 1911, mainly in Italy. He had associated with the firm of John Russell Pope after graduation, and returned from Europe to rejoin Pope's firm in November 1911 where he became the chief designer, working on the Vanderbilt mansion on Long Island and the New York Fifth Avenue mansion of Henry Clay Frick of Carnegie Steel Company.

He continued his association with Pope until he was persuaded to come to Columbus, Ohio to design the new football stadium about 1917. While he was designing and overseeing the construction of Ohio Stadium, he was also a Professor of Architecture at Ohio State for three years from 1918 to 1921. Ohio Stadium was then the largest two level, open ended stadium in the world. He then took a position as chief architect for the Columbus Public Schools. Later he returned to Ohio State where he served as University Architect from October 1929 to June 1956.

As his mentor Pope had done at Yale University, Smith revised a long term campus master plan for The Ohio State University. He proposed to extend the campus beyond the Olentangy River. Over his career as University Architect at Ohio State, especially in the post-World War II years, he designed or oversaw design and planning of some thirty University buildings, including the expansion of the landmark William Oxley Thompson Memorial Library, which dominates the main University landscape on the Oval. Among these were Hughes Hall (music), the Alpheus W. Smith Laboratory (physics), the Agricultural Laboratories, the optometry building, and especially the St. John Arena and French Field House. The task of designing and overseeing the construction of so many new buildings in those years became such that some outside architects were engaged for the purpose as, for example, with the Ohio Union, Mershon Auditorium, and most of those in the Medical Center complex. Smith-Steeb Hall is named after Dwight Smith and Carl E. Steeb.

Smith was in continual demand as a consultant for various agencies or on specific projects including Wittenberg College, the Upper Arlington Board of Education, the Columbus and Springfield YMCAs, the Deshler Hotel (Columbus), the million-dollar First Congregational Church, Columbus (where he represented the John Russell Pope office), the Springfield Masonic Temple, the Marietta and Columbus City Halls and Columbus West High School.

His work was also part of the architecture event in the art competition at the 1932 Summer Olympics.

== Notable works ==
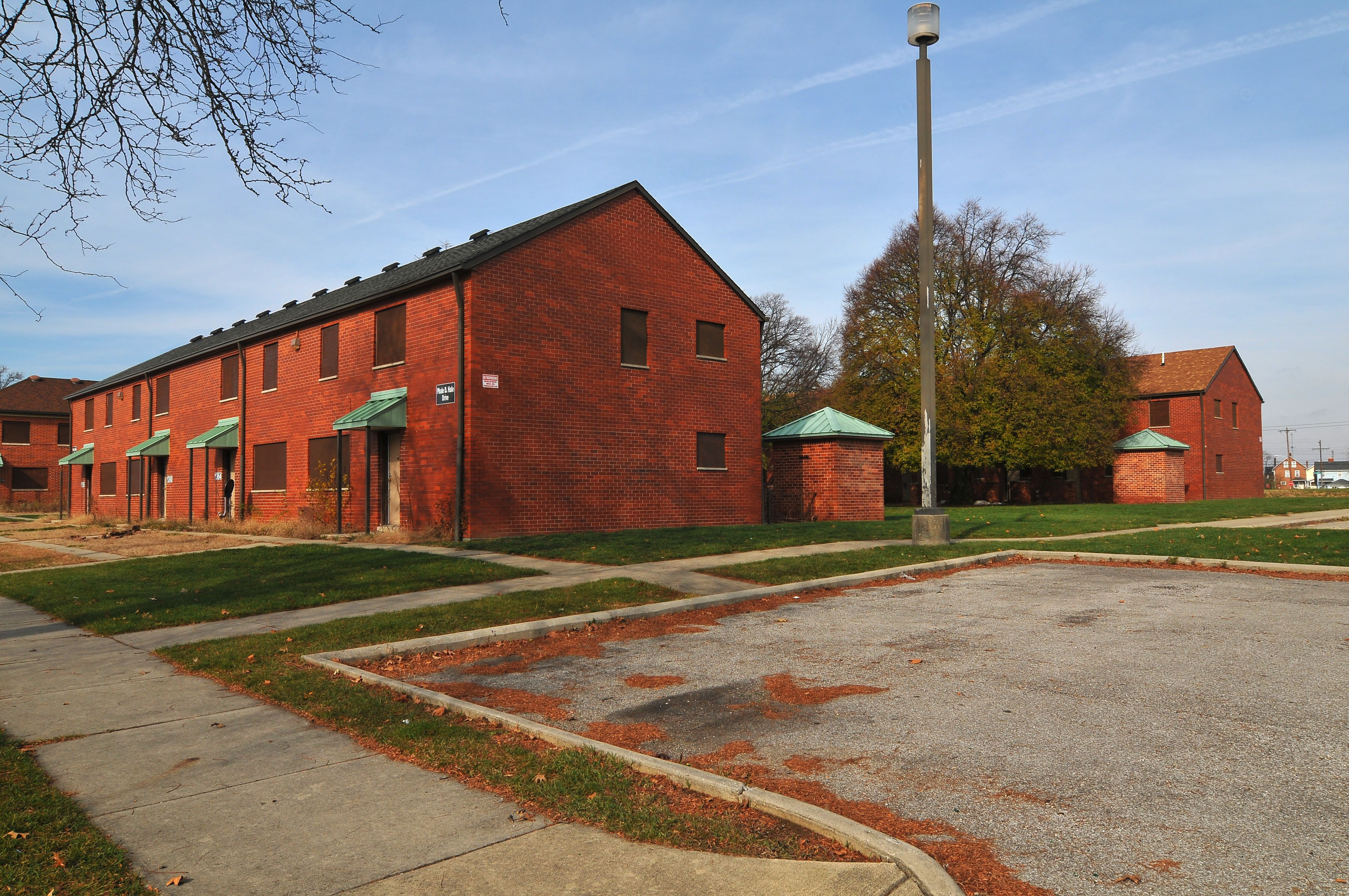
Poindexter Village (Columbus, Ohio), the first public housing development in the United States.

Works by Dwight Smith in Columbus include:

- Barrington Elementary School
- Bexley Junior-Elementary School (consulting architect)
- Clinton Elementary School
- Columbus Alternative High School
- Cooper Stadium
- Courtright Elementary School
- Everett Junior High School
- Fairwood Elementary School
- Former West High School addition
- Indianola Junior High School
- Jones High School (later Jones Middle School)
- Lincoln Park Elementary School
- Linden-McKinley High School
- McGuffey Elementary School
- North Side High School addition
- Open Air School
- Orton Memorial Laboratory
- Poindexter Village (consulting architect)
- Royal York Apartments
- West High School
- William McKinley Junior High School

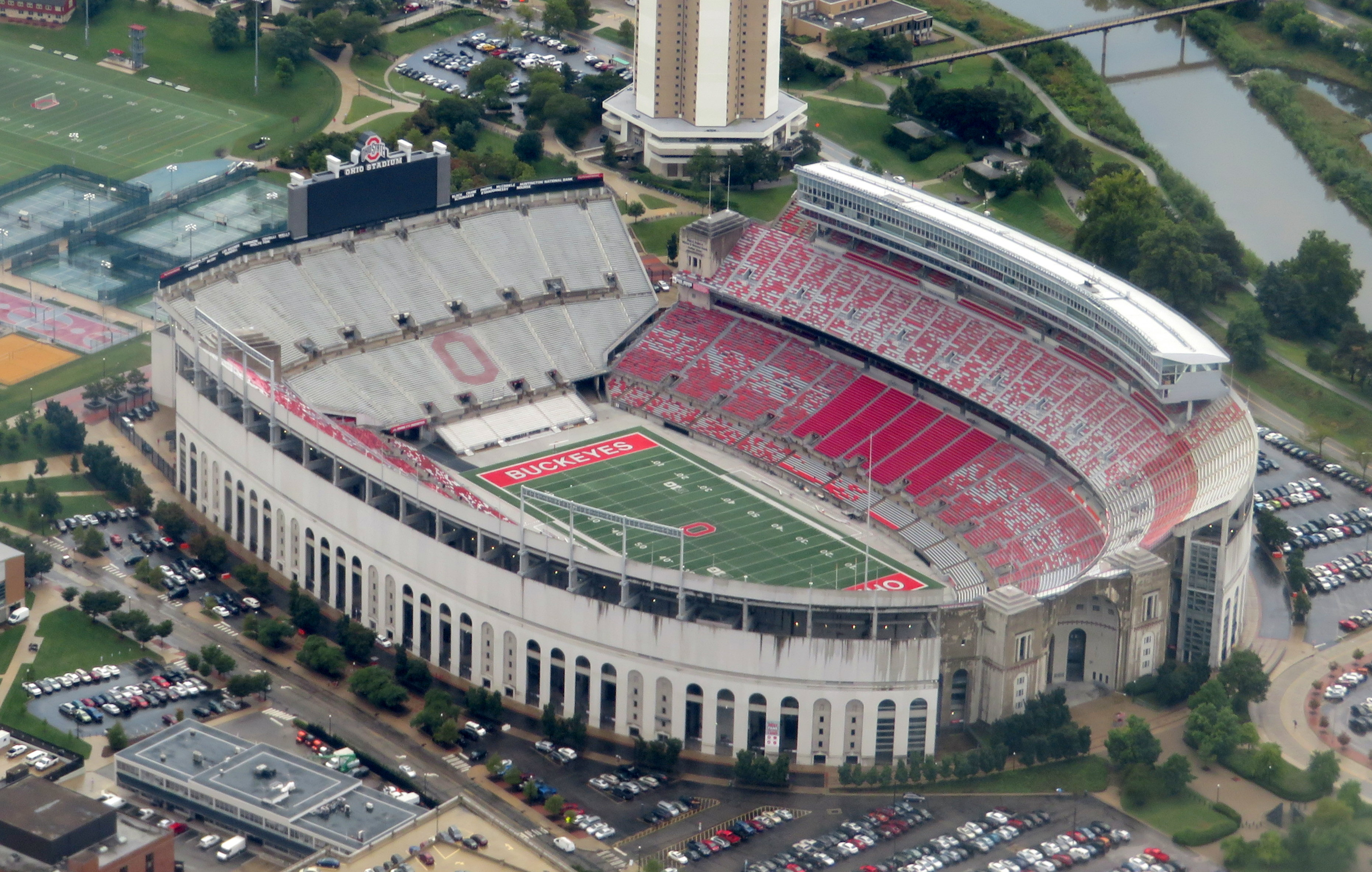
Aerial view of Ohio Stadium at Ohio State University

=== At the Ohio State University ===
Buildings at Ohio State include:

- Ohio Stadium
- St. John Arena
- William Oxley Thompson Memorial Library tower
- Pomerene Hall
- The Faculty Club
- Baker Hall
- Smith Laboratory
- Hughes Hall
- French Field House

=== Outside Columbus ===
- Jones Middle School, Upper Arlington, Ohio
- Masonic Temple, Springfield, Ohio
- Camp Wyandot Dining Hall, Rockbridge, Ohio

== Personal life ==
Dwight Smith married Myrna Cott of Columbus, Ohio, January 29, 1912. They had five children - Marjorie, Jackson, Howard, Myrna and Priscilla. After the death of his first wife, he married Mary Edith Thompson Gramlich, a widow with two daughters, Sybil and Jane, January 17, 1936. He resided in New York City from 1908 to 1917 and in Upper Arlington, Ohio until his death. An enthusiastic Buckeyes football fan, for years he had seats in Ohio Stadium in the row behind fellow Daytonian Orville Wright, another enthusiastic fan. Smith's grandchildren include the motion picture actress Beverly D'Angelo and the jazz musician Jeff D'Angelo. He is the father-in-law of Gene D'Angelo, former president of WBNS stations in Columbus, Ohio.

== See also ==
- Architecture of Columbus, Ohio

== Sources ==
- Ohio State University - Construction of Ohio Stadium
- Virginia Evans McCormick. Educational Architecture in Ohio: From One-room Schools and Carnegie Libraries to Community Education Villages Kent State University Press, 2001
