= Weinland Park =

- Neighborhood of Columbus
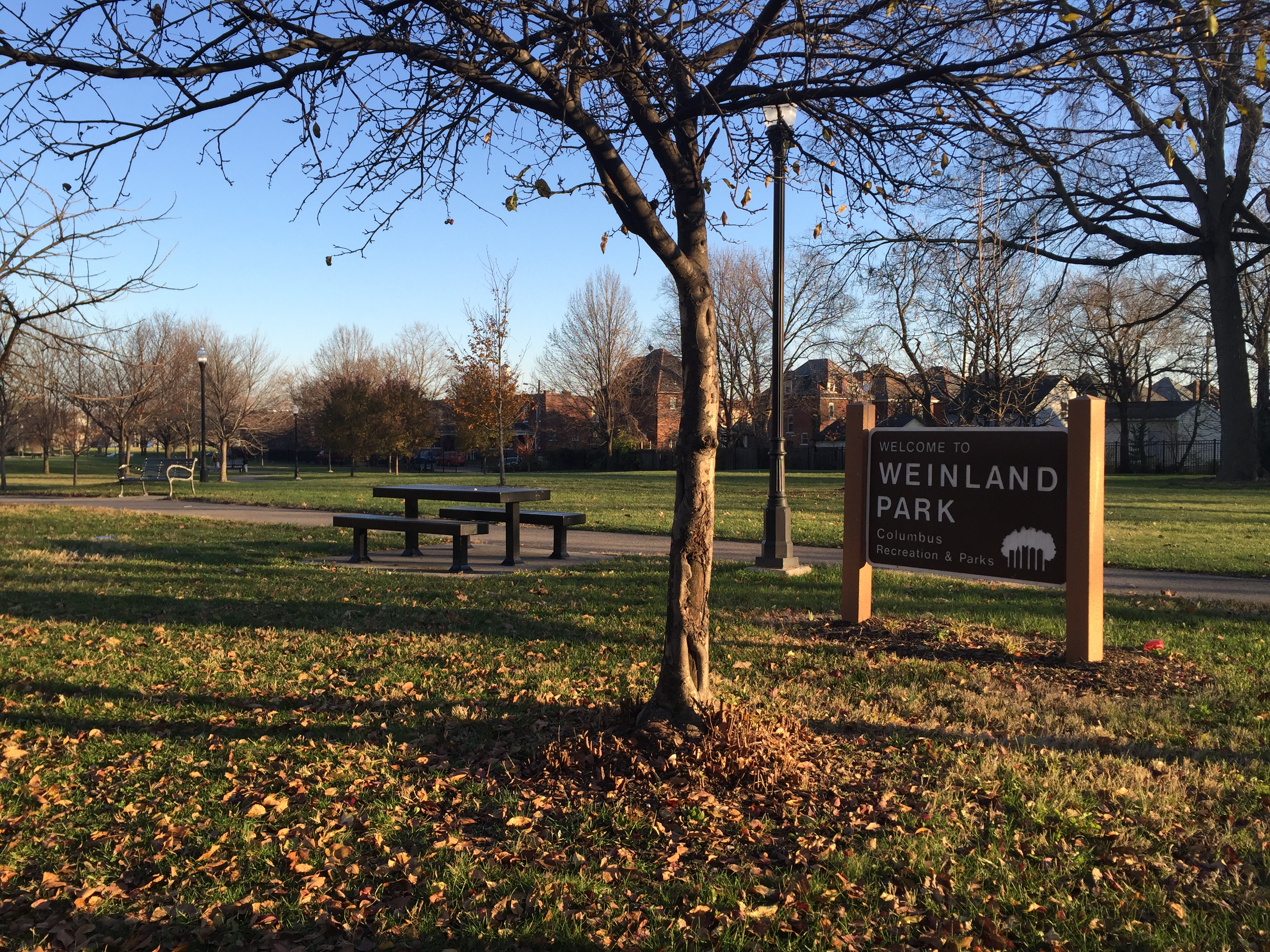
- Interactive map of the neighborhood
- Coordinates: 39°59′29.946″N 82°59′59.559″W
- Country: United States
- State: Ohio
- County: Franklin
- City: Columbus
- Zip Code: 43201
- Area code: 614

Weinland Park is a neighborhood north of downtown Columbus, Ohio and encompassed by the boundaries of the University District. A development boom in the 1930s and 1940s resulting from new streetcar lines and the blossoming of factories brought working and middle-class families to the neighborhood. Current housing stock consists primarily of single family residential buildings that have been converted to rentals or multifamily housing. Row-homes and apartment buildings are also ubiquitous in the neighborhood. Renters currently outnumber owners. Commercial and entertainment facilities are concentrated on the North High Street corridor, but also pocket the inner part of the neighborhood as well. Weinland Park saw the sapping of its population and wealth with the rise of newer suburbs ringing the outer reaches of the city and the collapse of local industry and streetcar lines. The neighborhood has been plagued with crime and drug problems for decades but has recently seen a flood of new investment that has brought growth and revitalization to this long struggling neighborhood. Investment into the community includes the South Campus Gateway providing retail and residential finished in 2005, and a new food district and employment center.

== History ==
Weinland Park bears the name of Edgar L. Weinland, member of the first law class of Ohio State University. Weinland was born in Middletown, Ohio, Ohio but was raised in Westerville, Ohio. He started his career as assistant city solicitor before moving on to become the city solicitor of George Marshall. Acting under the Columbus Housing Authority as city councilman, Weinland was crucial in the annexation of a parcel of land for park space which in turn was called Weinland Park. The current geographical boundary of the neighborhood was given the name of this park as well, though it is unknown when the name became generally used.

In the late 1800s, the City of Columbus annexed the area along North High Street, including what would later become Weinland Park. From 1900 to 1920, the area developed into a streetcar suburb centered around industry; several factories, such as Columbus Coated Fabrics and the Jeffrey Manufacturing Company, were located in the vicinity which provided work for the residents. At around the same time, the Great Migration brought many African Americans from the rural South to Midwestern cities like Columbus and increased the diversity of the neighborhood. Post World War II, Weinland Park experienced the effects of suburbanization, white flight, and disinvestment which occurred across the nation at the time. Cocaine was introduced to the neighborhood in the 1980s, only exacerbating those issues. Gangs were formed within the community, the most notorious of them being the Short North Posse. The location of the gang's headquarters, North Fourth Street and East Eight Avenue, was once the most dangerous street corner in the entirety of Columbus. Joblessness, crime, disinvestment, and further flight of residents continued to wear down the community. Public housing projects implemented in Weinland Park during the 1980s and 1990s such as Windsor Terrace and HOPE VI housing failed in many aspects and only further contributed to the downturn of the neighborhood.

Recently, the community has moved forward from these historical events. Many different organizations and community members have been implementing revitalization efforts since as early as 1986. However, the most ambitious and comprehensive effort started in 2010 with the establishment of the Weinland Park Collaborative, a partnership composed of Ohio State University, the City of Columbus, Habitat for Humanity, the Weinland Park Community Civic Association, and many other stakeholders that pooled funding and resources with which to improve the neighborhood. The collaboration had seven main focuses: education, employment, health, housing, public safety, resident engagement, and youth development. The collaborative phased out its work in 2019.

== Geography ==
Weinland Park is located North of Downtown Columbus and East of Ohio State University. It is bounded on the north by Chittenden Avenue, the south by Fifth Avenue, the east by the existing railroad tracks, and the west by North High Street and it covers approximately 217 acres of land. It is one of thirteen neighborhoods within the University District.

Areas around Weinland Park include Indianola Terrace to the north, Italian Village to the south, Milo-Grogan to the east, Ohio State University campus to the northwest, and Peach District, Dennison Place, and The Circles to the west.

Perceptions of Weinland Park's geography align fairly closely with its official geography. The eastern and western borders of the neighborhood are clearly delineated by High Street and the railroad tracks, however the neighborhood's northern and southern boundaries are more fluid. As a result, perceptions of the Weinland Park geography may overlap with the Indianola Terrace and Italian Village.

== Transportation ==
Weinland Park is a gridded, transit-oriented neighborhood with easily accessible one way roads, and COTA bus stops at several locations. The number 4 bus line goes down the length of Summit Street and North 4th Street located within the Weinland Park neighborhood. Additionally, the number 8 and 52 lines go through the northern portion of the neighborhood by the South Campus Gateway and meet up with several lines that go down the span of North High Street.

== Land use ==
The City of Columbus has designated Weinland Park, in addition to portions of the larger University District as a Community Reinvestment Area that is "ready for revitalization", with available 15-year, 100 percent tax abatements for all projects that include 10 percent affordable housing, with options to buy out of the requirement.

=== Residential ===
Weinland Park has roughly 5000 residents who live in about 2000 households. The homeowner occupancy rate is less than ten percent, and the housing vacancy rate is 4 percent, down from 20 percent in 2010. The median cost to rent a residence in Weinland Park was $637 per month in 2015. As the area loses the association with the Short North Posse, rental prices and property taxes rise. In terms of housing variety, Weinland Park has a rather wide spectrum from single-family homes to row houses. Many of the homes in the neighborhood fall under the American foursquare architectural style. While architectural style varies widely, Weinland Park is technically under the jurisdiction of the University Area Review Board and the New Indianola Historic District. The affordable housing efforts put into motion by the Weinland Park Collaborative are worth noting. A few of these efforts include the Neighborhood Stabilization Program, lease-to-purchase single-family home development, Habitat for Humanity housing, and Low Income Housing.

=== Commercial and entertainment ===
The northern border of Weinland Park looking towards N. High Street. The most prevalent area of the Weinland Park neighborhood that contains commercial businesses is on the East side of North High Street spanning from East 11th Ave. to East 9th Ave. Located here is the South Campus Gateway which includes several restaurants and the Gateway Film Center. The Gateway Film Center offers a selection of different movies each week, showing a variety old and new films. The Gateway is a popular place for students and other residents to gather and socialize. It also includes major book chain Barnes & Noble that serves as campus book store to Ohio State University as well. Another significant commercial facility is the supermarket chain Kroger, located at North high Street and East Seventh Avenue.

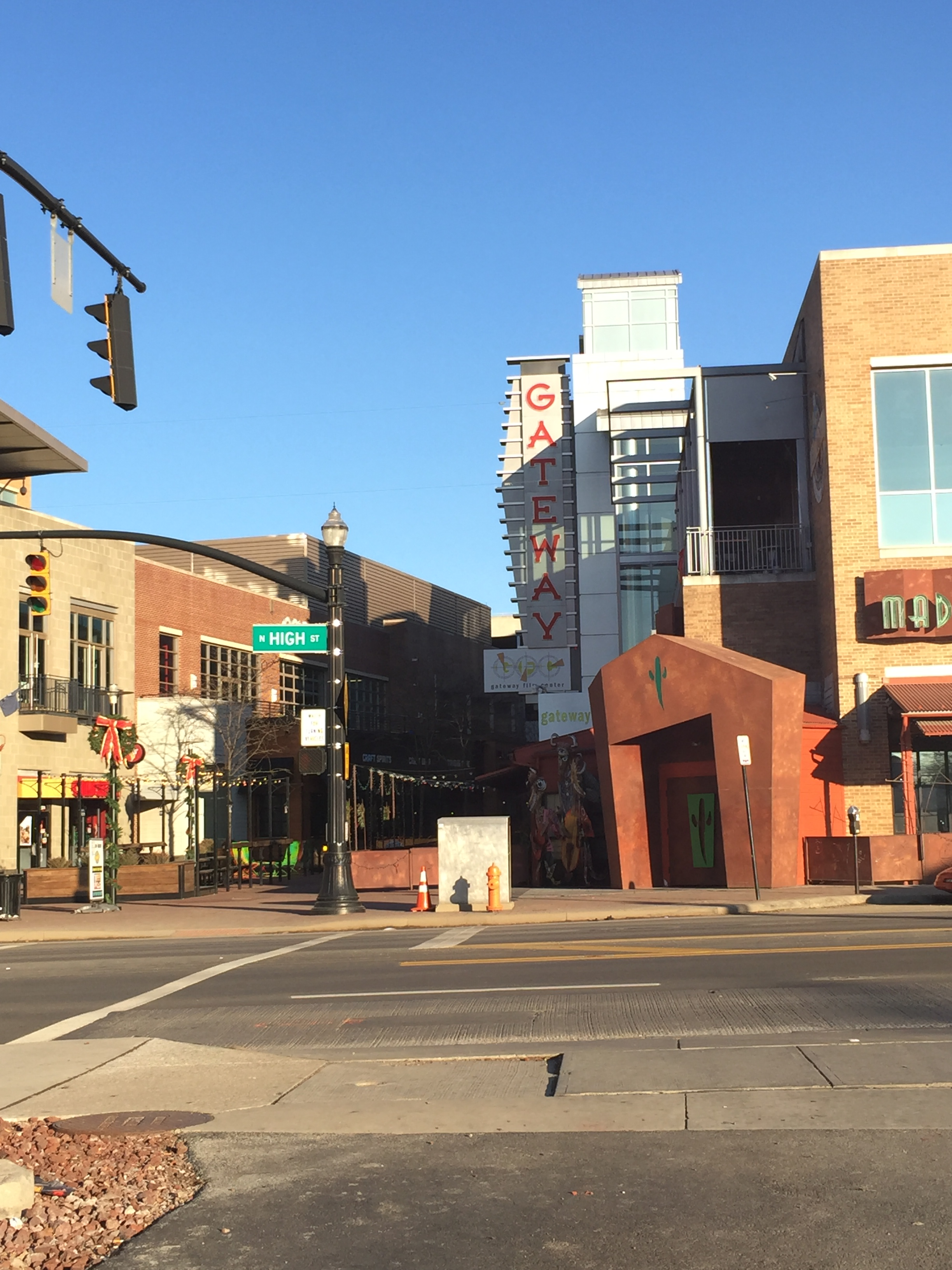
South Campus Gateway

=== Parks and landmarks ===
Weinland Park has several notable landmarks and memorable architectural structures.

==== The Mound ====
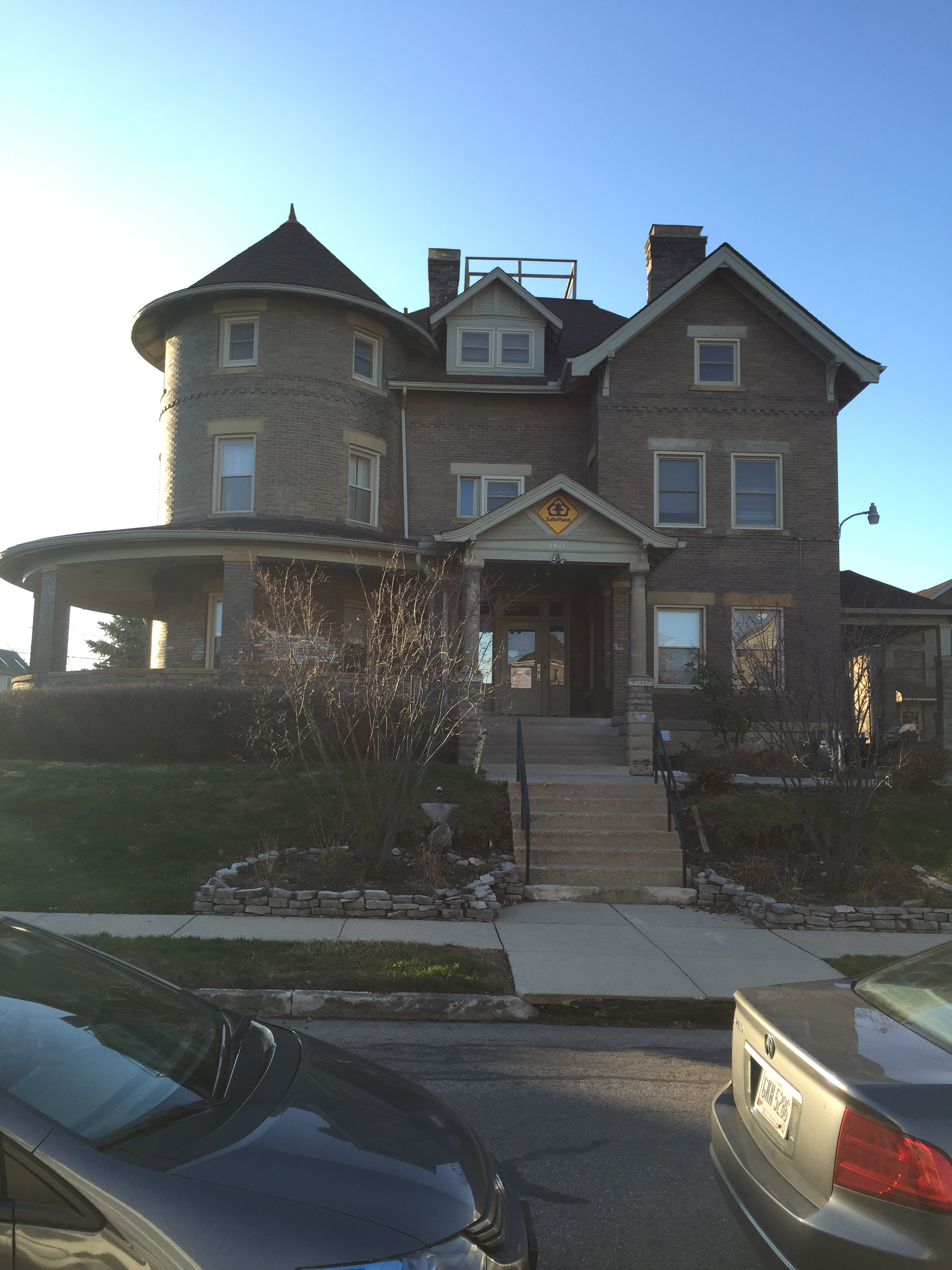
Huckleberry House

A notable geographical feature of Weinland Park is a 20-acre brownfield site called "The Mound" . Once home to Columbus Coated Fabrics, the soil on this site was thoroughly contaminated by pollutants created in the manufacturing processes that occurred there. The site was remediated through a $3 million Clean Ohio Grant and now sits empty with sparsely growing native vegetation - an irresistible scene for one citizen's Weinland Park take on the iconic Hollywood sign. Moving forward, the Mound is slated for conversion into a development including single-family homes, multi-family units, and open space.

==== Huckleberry House ====
Located at 1421 Hamlet Street, its primary function is a shelter for youths. Within the house are multiple programs for supporting youths with mental, emotional, and physical problems. It is a safe space for troubled youths to come and stay (overnight if they want) and receive assistance.

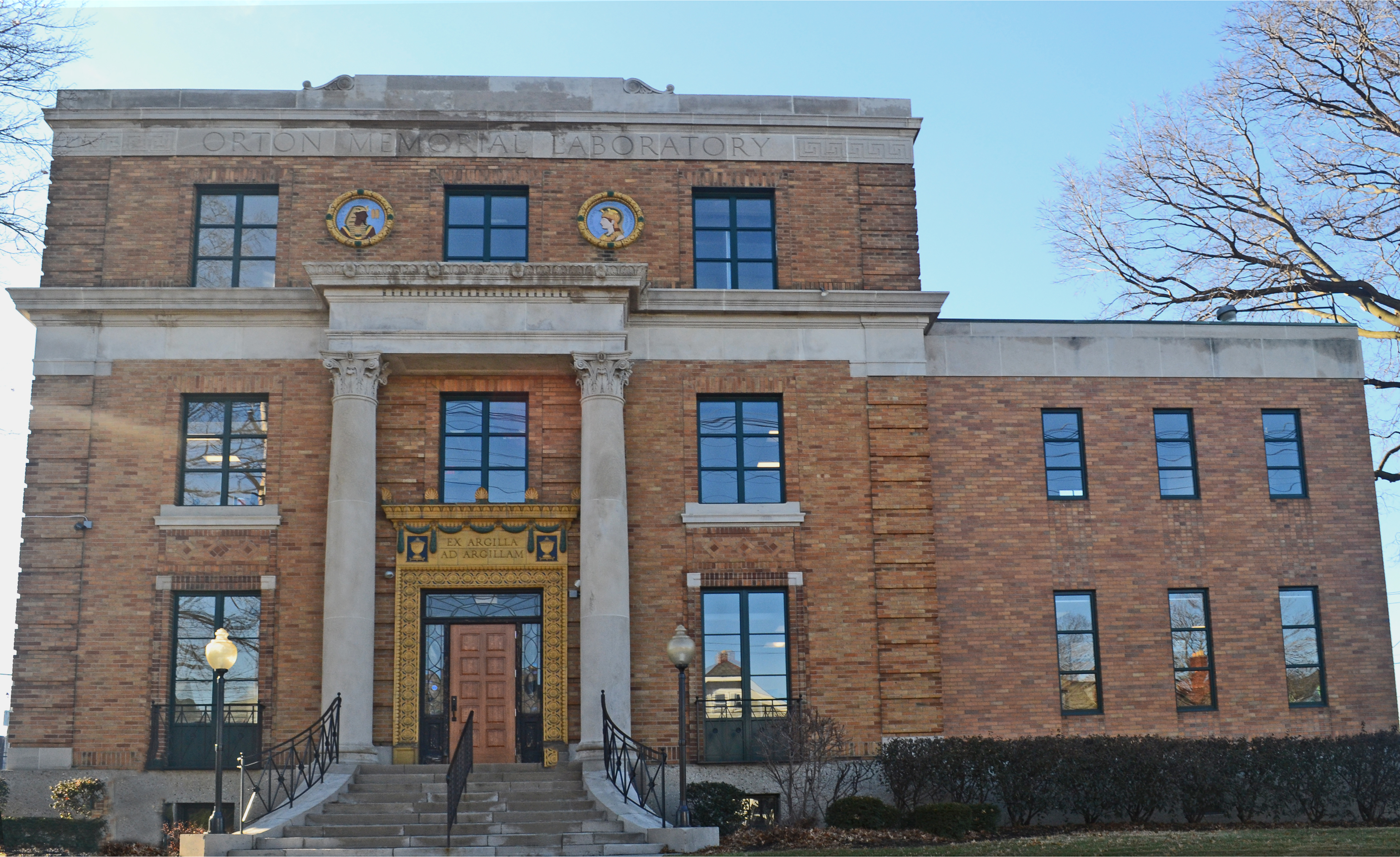
Orton Memorial Laboratory

==== Orton Memorial Laboratory ====
Built in 1929 and positioned at 1445 Summit Street, Orton Memorial Laboratory was originally used as the headquarters for the Standard Pyrometric Cone Company. The company was established by the son of the founding President of Ohio State University. The laboratory was designed by Howard Dwight Smith, the same architect who designed the Thompson Library and Ohio Stadium. A recent rehabilitation project turned the laboratory into a modern, industrial office space.

==== Weinland Park ====
Located at 1280 Summit St., the park is 3.92 acres and features picnic space, a playground and a basketball court.

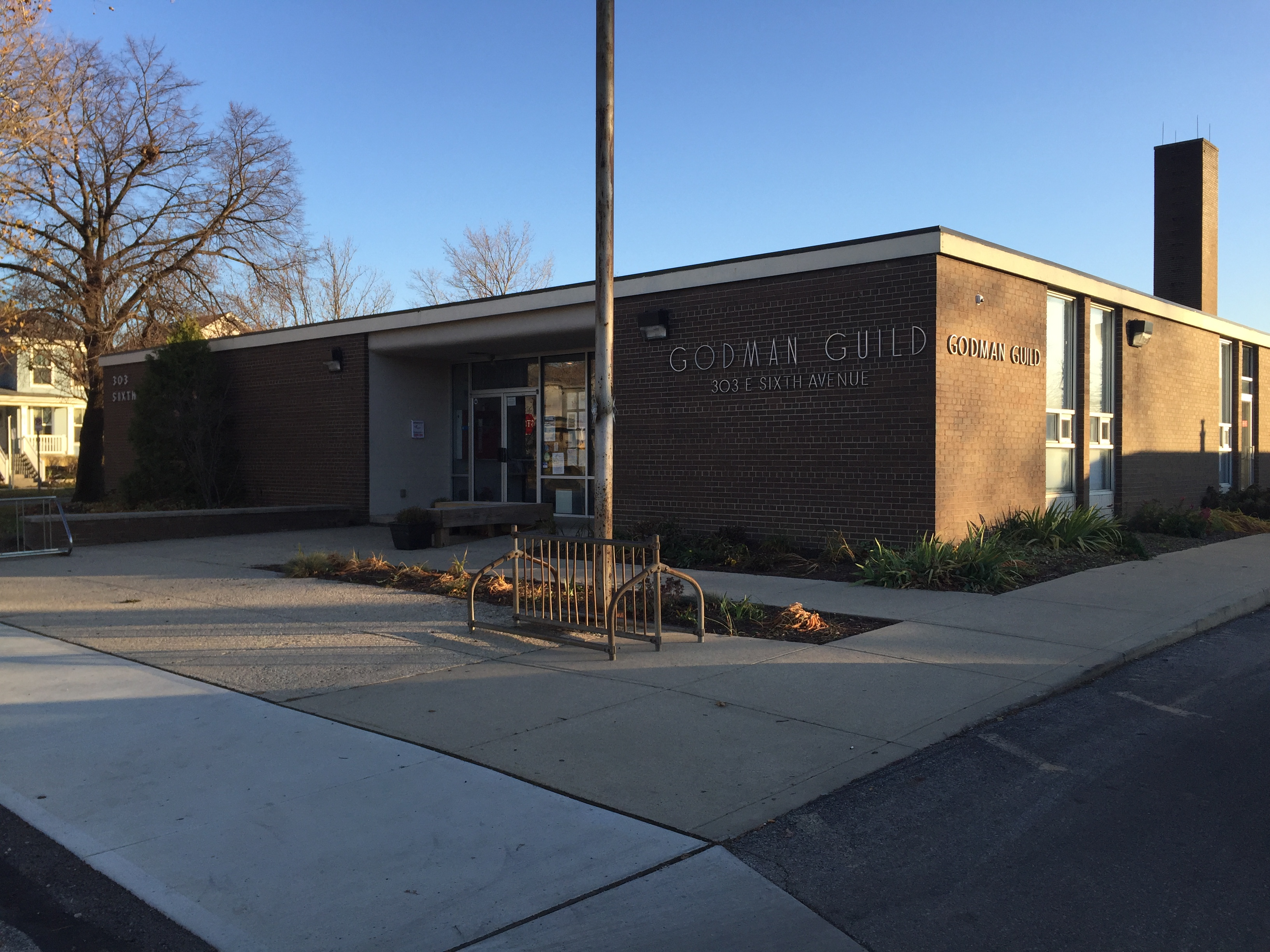
Godman Guild

==== Godman Guild ====
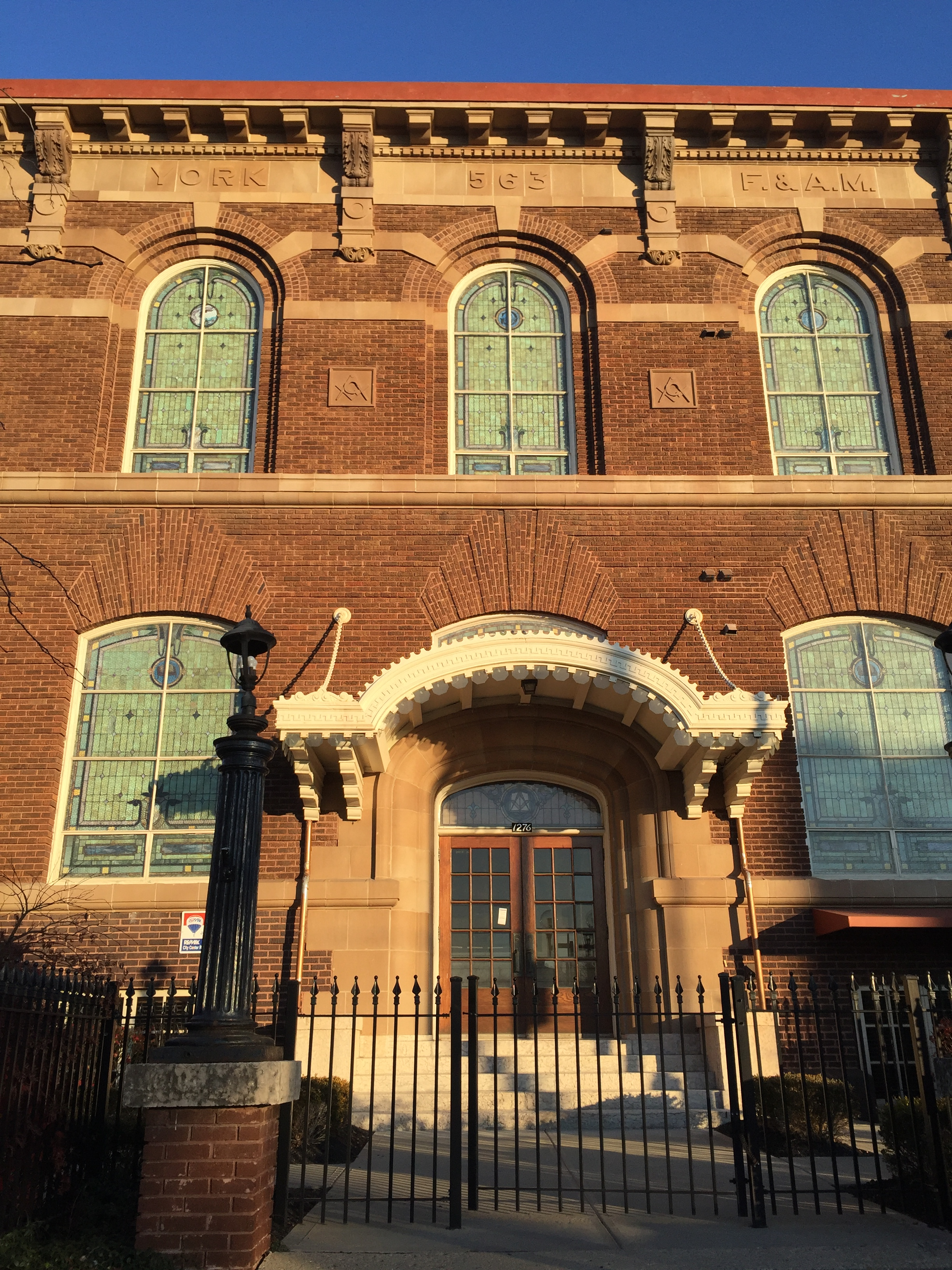
York Temple

This building was originally the Sixth Avenue Elementary school building. It was neglected after closing in 1974 until it was converted to Godman Guild's East Office in 1990. The Godman Guild Association itself was founded in 1898 as a settlement house. At its site in Weinland Park, it facilitates programs that support community members and catalyze their success. Such programs include youth programming, adult education, health and wellness programs, and a community garden.

==== York Temple ====
Once a Masonic Lodge, York Lodge No. 563 was recently converted to condominiums on North High Street. The designer kept as much of the bones of the building as possible when constructing the new plans. The marble floors, brass doorknobs, woodwork and stained glass are still present in the condos.

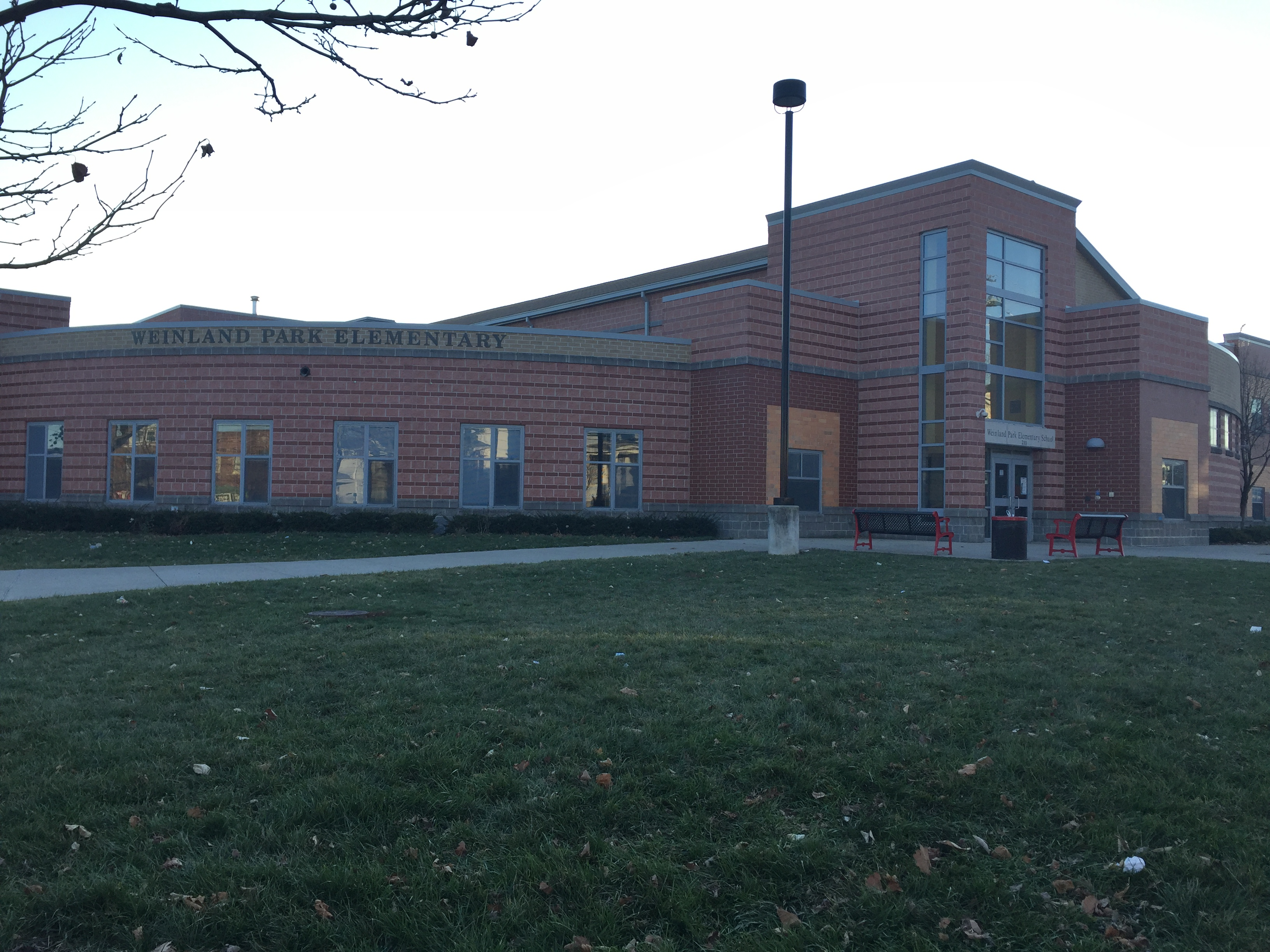
Weinland Park Elementary School

==== Weinland Park Elementary School ====
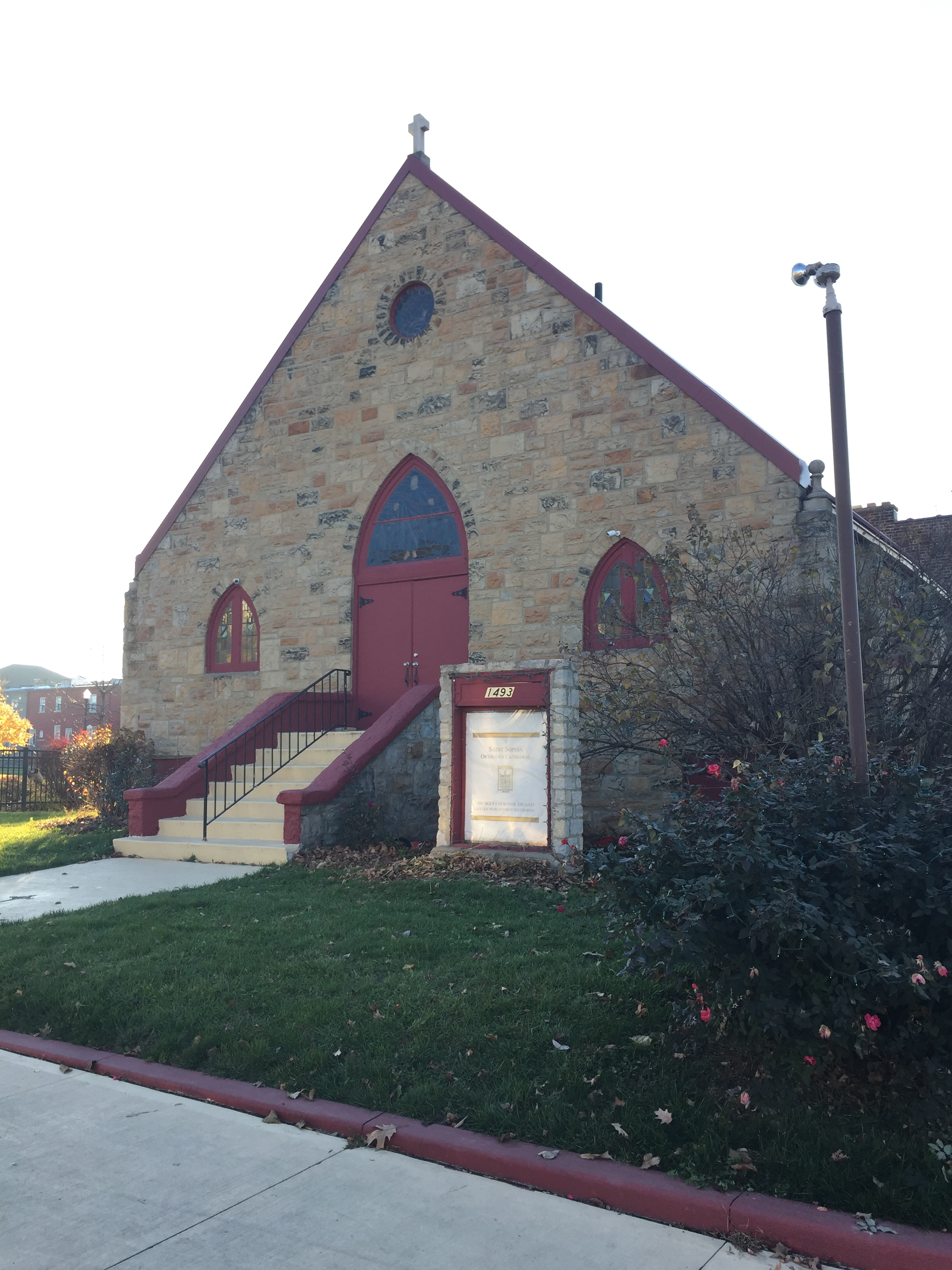
St. Sophia Orthodox Cathedral

There is only one public school located within the Weinland Park neighborhood: Weinland Park Elementary School. Located at 211 East Seventh Avenue, it opened in 1952. It offers full-day pre-kindergarten all the way up through 5th grade and uses the Schmoker Instructional Model. The school is part of the Weinland Park Birth-Grade 5 Complex, and as such, offers a child care program and an array of after-school activities. It is an Annie Cassy Grant recipient and has a partnership with Ohio State University which focuses on the engagement of students in STEM. Weinland Park Elementary School is ranked 1483rd of elementary schools in Ohio.

==== St. Sophia Orthodox Cathedral ====
This small stone cathedral was founded by Archbishop John-Cassian Lewis in 1990. Its outreach center serves bagels and coffee every morning, as well as a meal at 5pm. The church is also a youth football team sponsor. The address is 1493 Indianola Ave.

==== Kroger ====
Ten million dollars was invested in redeveloping the old Kroger located at this site as part of the Weinland Park Collaborative in order to double its size and increase its capacity for services.
