= Orton Memorial Laboratory =

- U.S. National Register of Historic Places
- Columbus Register of Historic Properties
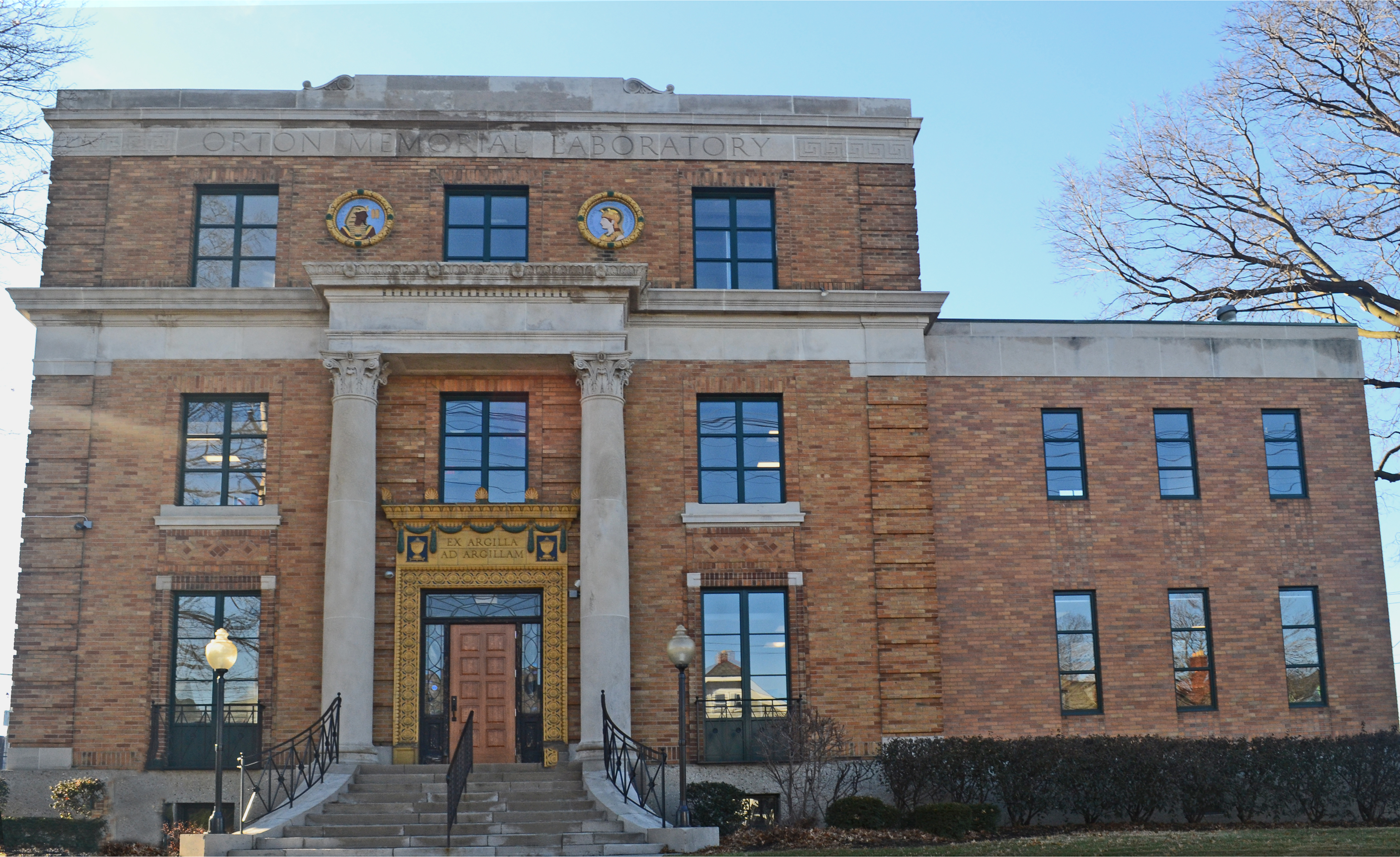
- Interactive map highlighting the building's location
- Location: 1445 Summit Street, Columbus, Ohio
- Coordinates: 39.992442°N 83.002099°W
- Built: 1929
- Architect: Howard Dwight Smith
- Architectural style: Neoclassical
- NRHP reference No.: 83004292
- CRHP No.: CR-17

Significant dates
- Added to NRHP: November 25, 1983
- Designated CRHP: April 4, 1983

The Orton Memorial Laboratory is a historic building in the Weinland Park neighborhood of Columbus, Ohio. It was listed on the National Register of Historic Places in 1983.

Built in 1929, Orton Memorial Laboratory was originally used as the headquarters for the Standard Pyrometric Cone Company. The company was established by the son of the founding president of the Ohio State University. The laboratory was designed by Howard Dwight Smith, the same architect who designed the Thompson Library and the Ohio Stadium. A recent rehabilitation project turned the laboratory into a modern industrial office space.

Additions to the building include the west wing, added in 1956, and the east wing, added in 1962.

== See also ==
- National Register of Historic Places listings in Columbus, Ohio
