= CAHS (disambiguation) =

CAHS may refer to:

- Canadian Aviation Historical Society
- Canadian Academy of Health Sciences, a national academy in Canada
- Carman-Ainsworth High School, a public school in Flint, Michigan
- The College of Allied Health Sciences at the University of Cincinnati
- Colorado Aviation Historical Society
- Columbus Alternative High School, a central Ohio public high school in the Columbus City School district
- Council of Australian Humanist Societies
