= Masonic Temple (Springfield, Ohio) =

- U.S. National Register of Historic Places
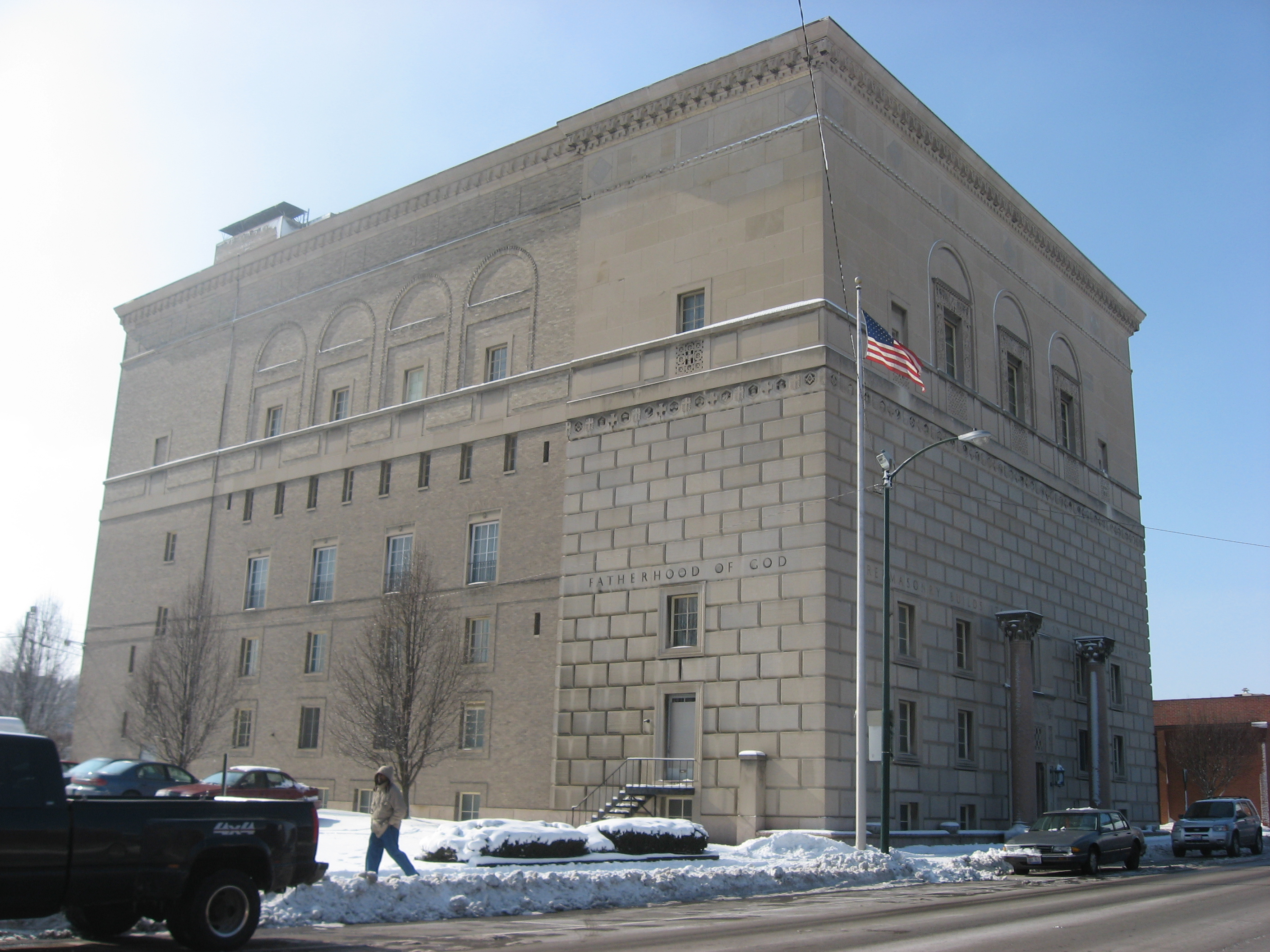
- Front and side of the temple

- Location within Ohio Location within the United States
- Location: 125 W. High St., Springfield, Ohio
- Coordinates: 39°55′24″N 83°48′48″W
- Built: 1927
- Architect: Howard Dwight Smith
- Website: https://www.springfieldmasonic.org/
- NRHP reference No.: 08001195
- Added to NRHP: December 17, 2008

The Masonic Temple is a historic structure in Springfield, Ohio, United States. Located along High Street in downtown Springfield, the temple was designed by Howard Dwight Smith and the firm of Miller & Reeves. Local Freemasons have met at the temple since construction was finished in January 1927.

The temple was added to the National Register of Historic Places in December 2008. In nominating the temple for inclusion on the Register, the Ohio Historical Society highlighted its significance as the home of the oldest fraternal organization in Springfield.
