= Linden (Columbus, Ohio) =

Neighborhood in Columbus, Ohio

- Neighborhood of Columbus, Ohio
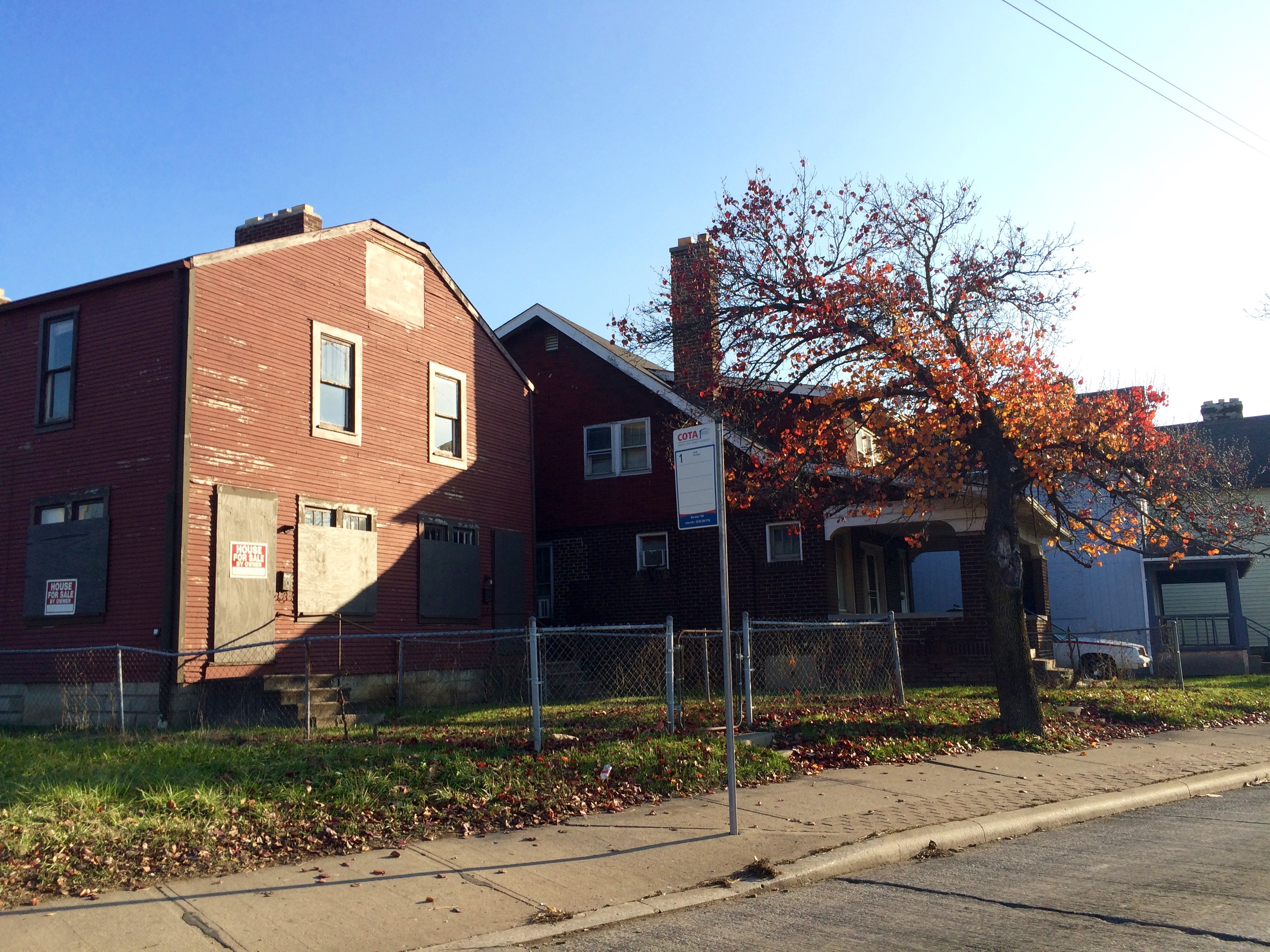
- Houses in South Linden
- Interactive map of Linden
- Coordinates: 40°01′17″N 82°58′23″W
- Country: United States
- State: Ohio
- County: Franklin
- City: Columbus
- Founded: 1908
- ZIP Code: 43211, 43224
- Area code: 614/380

Linden is a neighborhood in northeastern Columbus, Ohio. It was established in 1908 as Linden Heights Village, and was annexed into Columbus in 1921. The neighborhood saw high levels of development in the 1920s. By the 1960s, suburban development, city income taxation and racial factors caused families, especially white residents, to leave the neighborhood. Since this time, Linden has struggled with poverty, crime, vacancies, and health and societal problems.

== History ==
The Linden neighborhood was part of a land grant by John Adams to George Stevenson of Delaware for his service in the American War of Independence. Early settlers such as Frederick Weber, Gustavus Innis and Henry Huy are commemorated in the names of local roads. It was established in 1908 as Linden Heights Village, and grew into a bedroom community with a prominent commercial district centered on Cleveland Avenue.

The community had desired annexation into the city of Columbus early in its history. Their boundaries did not meet, making annexation impossible. The community was centered around Cleveland Avenue and Weber Road, and expanded territory south toward Columbus, in hopes Columbus would expand north. Linden community leaders voted to allow the annexation in 1921, making Linden into a neighborhood of Columbus. The annexation allowed for adequate utilities, which allowed for housing developments. The northeast corridor, including Linden, saw the greatest number of housing subdivisions constructed in the 1920s, 29 percent of the citywide total. This rapid development was often controlled by deed restrictions, including setback, price, and race restrictions (barring African Americans and other minorities from purchasing property). In 1935, a federal redlining map of the city was released. The map racially targeted minority neighborhoods, and classified much of Linden as high-risk to investors.

In the 1960s, suburbanization affected Linden, drawing many residents away into other neighborhoods. Major factors included urban unrest, suburban subsidies including low-interest loans, and governmental financing for road and highway construction outside of cities. Civil rights activism also led reactionary white residents to leave, seeking more segregated suburbs. Interstate 71 was built through the west side of the neighborhood in 1960-61. Some houses and commercial buildings were demolished to make room for the interstate, though not to the extent of other areas like Milo-Grogan and King-Lincoln Bronzeville.

Since the 1960s, the neighborhood's lower population led to a stagnant economy, with lower housing costs, unemployment, poverty, poor educational attainment, and high crime. The neighborhood is now known to have high vacancies, low investment in housing and businesses, and poor streets and sidewalks.

== Geography ==
Linden's boundaries extend south to north from Eighth Avenue to East Cooke and Ferris roads and west to east from Conrail tracks to Joyce Avenue/Westerville Road. The neighborhood is officially bounded on the south, west and east by CSX-operated railroads. Hudson Street divides the neighborhood into North and South Linden. The neighborhood has a total land area of almost 5.79 square miles (15.0 km^{2}).

The neighborhood's primary commercial corridors are centered around its major streets – Cleveland Avenue, running north to south, and Hudson Street, running east to west.

== Demographics ==
Racial composition	1940	1950	1960	1970	1980	1990	2000	2010	2016 (est.)
White	96.2%	96.3%	83.6%	49.9%	34.4%	31.5%	25.7%	24.5%	23.0%
African American	3.7%	3.7%	16.4%	49.7%	64.6%	66.9%	69.7%	69.7%	63.4%
Other or multiracial	0.1%	0.1%	0.01%	0.4%	1.0%	1.6%	4.6%	5.8%	13.6%

Historical population
Census	Pop.	Note	%±
1940	17,266		—
1950	27,070		56.8%
1960	32,543		20.2%
1970	31,799		−2.3%
1980	26,233		−17.5%
1990	24,002		−8.5%
2000	20,711		−13.7%
2010	17,628		−14.9%
2016 (est.)	18,079		2.6%
One Linden community plan

In the 2010 U.S. Census, the neighborhood had a population of 17,628. It had 8,639 housing units.

== Development ==
The City of Columbus has designated Linden as a Community Reinvestment Area that is "ready for opportunity", with available 15-year, 100 percent tax abatements for all projects, with no affordable housing requirements. The neighborhood designation was created in 2002.

== Schools ==
Linden has numerous elementary schools, including Linden STEM Academy, North Linden Elementary, Hamilton STEM Academy, East Linden Elementary, Como Elementary, and Windsor STEM Academy. Linden-McKinley STEM Academy is the public middle/high school. Another high school is the Columbus Alternative High School.

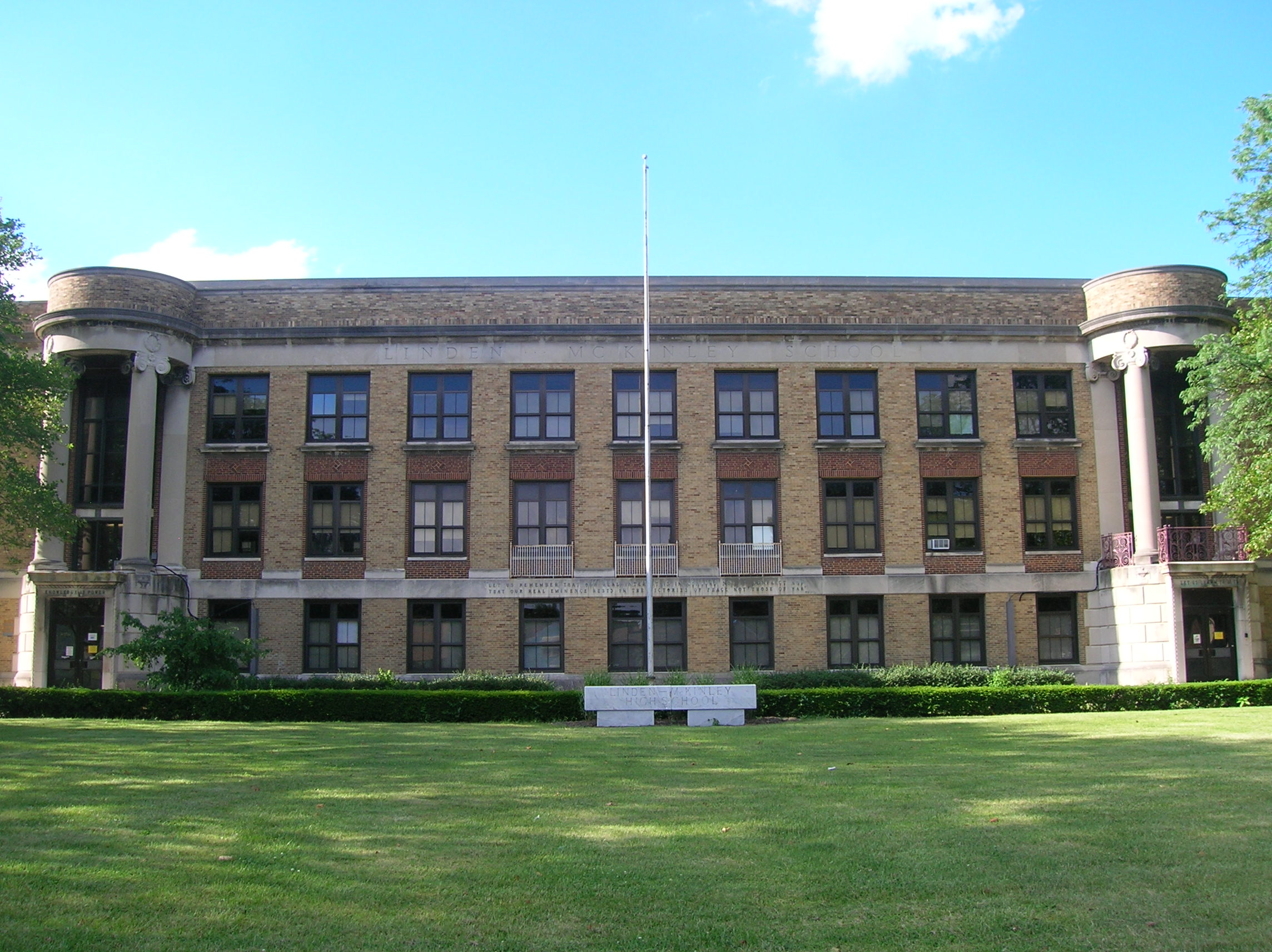
Linden-McKinley High School

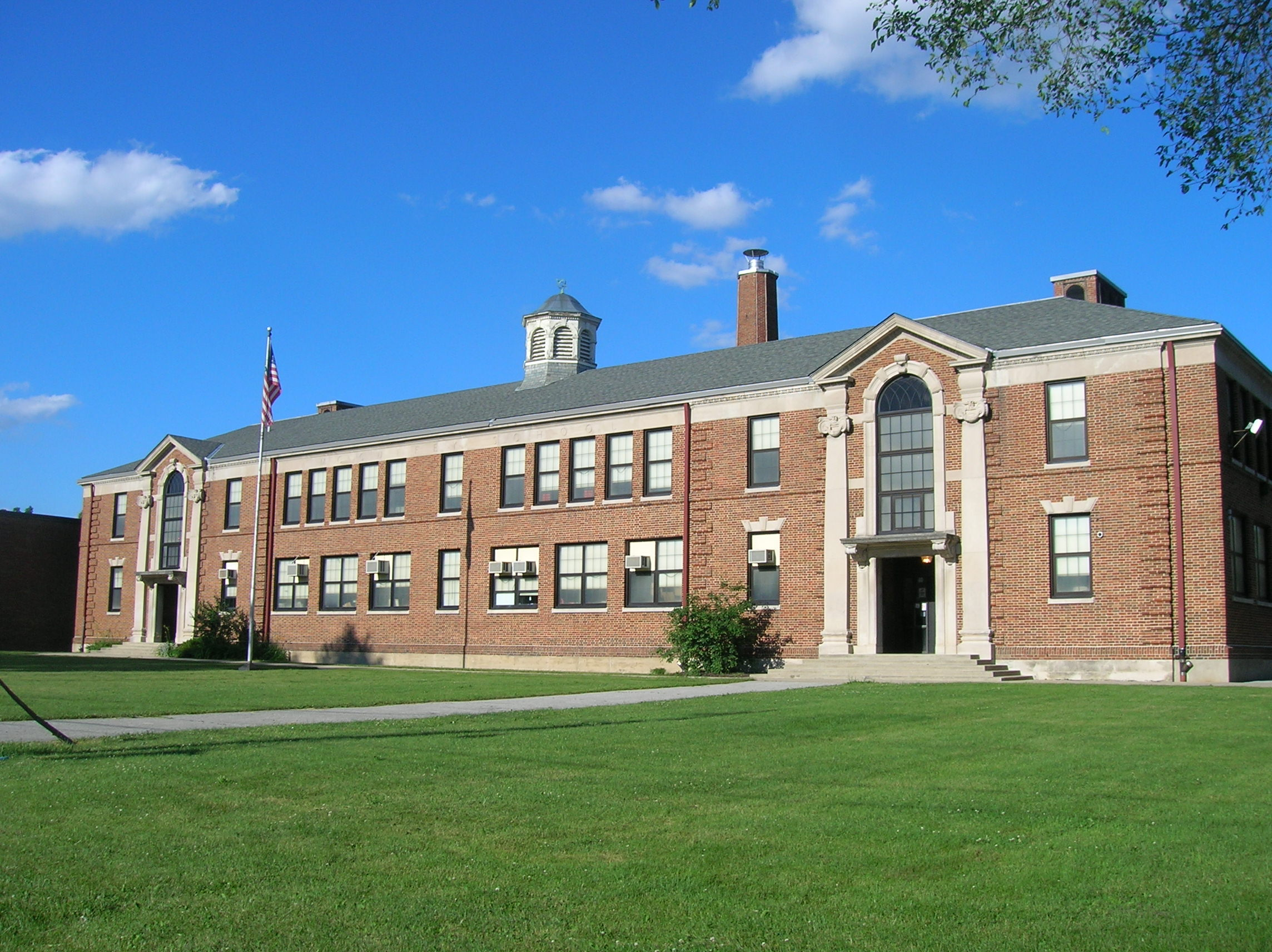
Columbus Alternative High School

== Food access ==
Linden lacks a major commercial grocery store. Food insecurity is high for South and East Linden, rated as one of five zip codes with very low food security in Columbus. A Kroger store in North Linden closed in 2018, replaced by Saraga International Grocery in 2019.

== See also ==
- Columbus All Nations SDA Church
