= Columbus All Nations SDA Church =

Church in Ohio, United States

Columbus All Nations Seventh-Day Adventist Church
- Columbus All Nations Seventh-Day Adventist Church
- 40.0327°N 82.9874°W
- Address: 994 Oakland Park Avenue, Columbus, Ohio
- Country: United States
- Denomination: Seventh-day Adventist
- Website: columbusallnationsoh.adventistchurch.org

History
- Former name(s): Oakland Park Evangelical United Brethren Church, Oakland Park United Methodist Church
- Status: In use
- Founded: 2009
- Founder: Kwesi Gyimah

Architecture
- Architect: Howard W. Tuttle
- Style: Modernist
- Groundbreaking: August 15, 1965
- Completed: July 24, 1966
- Construction cost: $150,000

Specifications
- Capacity: 350 seats

The Columbus All Nations Seventh-day Adventist Church is a church in the North Linden neighborhood of Columbus, Ohio. The church was founded in 2009, and congregates in the former Oakland Park United Methodist Church, first built in 1952 as the Oakland Park Evangelical United Bretheren Church. The building was expanded around 1955, and another larger wing was built from 1965 to 1966. The new wing included a prominent sanctuary designed in the midcentury modern style by Columbus architect Howard W. Tuttle.

== Attributes ==
The building has 22,000 square feet (2,000 m^{2}). It was designed by Howard W. Tuttle, and was described as a "striking" "church-in-the-round" by The Columbus Dispatch at its opening. The building's entranceway leads to a narthex, an area for church members to socialize. Past the narthex is a 350-seat sanctuary was designed so the congregation could have a part in the worship. Its altar was placed in the center of the room, with open-ended pews surrounding it. The altar included a walnut altar table and an oak cross, built with a motor to allow the entire congregation to face it within an hour's time. Stained-glass clerestory windows surrounding the sanctuary diffuse light on its brick walls. The sanctuary was originally decorated with a rich green carpet and pew cushions made with red and green tweed.

The building was relatively unique with its dodecagon (twelve-sided) shape, its diminishing folded plate roof with flying gables, and twelve large stained glass clerestory windows.

== History ==
The Oakland Park Evangelical United Brethren (EUB) Church first built a church on the site in 1952, opening on August 3. The church was the first by the Ohio-Southeast Conference of the EUB Church since it formed in 1951. The church was a brick building seating 110 people. In 1955, the church planned a new wing to the building, holding a sanctuary and classrooms. The Oakland Park Evangelical United Brethren Church built a prominent addition on the site from 1965 to 1966. Its groundbreaking took place on August 15, 1965, and its cornerstone was laid on January 16, 1966. It was estimated to cost $150,000. The construction also involved renovating the church's old sanctuary to hold classrooms, and construction of new classrooms. The first service was held on July 24, 1966, by Reverend Howard Bower. His sermon was titled "Come Ye to the House of the Lord".

In 1968, the EUB merged with the Methodist Church to form the United Methodist Church. The church became known as the Oakland Park United Methodist Church, operating until 2015. The building now houses the Columbus All Nations Seventh-day Adventist Church. The church was founded with fourteen members in 2009 by Rev. Kwesi Gyimah, a native of Ghana who was raised in Nigeria. The church moved into 994 Oakland Park in 2016.

The 1966-built house of worship is significant for its Modernist architecture, one of few remaining religious buildings in the style in Columbus. The city has yet to consider the history and architecture of many of its Midcentury Modern buildings, and so these structures often find themselves at risk of alterations and demolition. The loss of the landmark 1960s Kahiki Supper Club accentuated the risk of overlooking these iconic structures.
