= Ken Byers =

American football player (born 1940)

No. 60, 66
- Position: Offensive lineman

Personal information
- Born: April 6, 1940 (age 86); Logan, Ohio, U.S.
- Listed height: 6 ft 1 in (1.85 m)
- Listed weight: 240 lb (109 kg)

Career information
- High school: Linden-McKinley (OH)
- College: Cincinnati
- NFL draft: 1962: 7th round, 97th overall pick
- AFL draft: 1962: 16th round, 126th overall pick

Career history
- New York Giants (1962–1964); Minnesota Vikings (1964–1965)

Career NFL statistics
- Games played: 56
- Games started: 9
- Fumble recoveries: 1
- Stats at Pro Football Reference

Kenneth Vernon Byers Jr. (born April 6, 1940) is an American former professional football player who was an offensive lineman for three seasons with the New York Giants and Minnesota Vikings of the National Football League (NFL). He played college football for the Cincinnati Bearcats.
