= Linden-McKinley High School =

Linden-McKinley STEM Academy
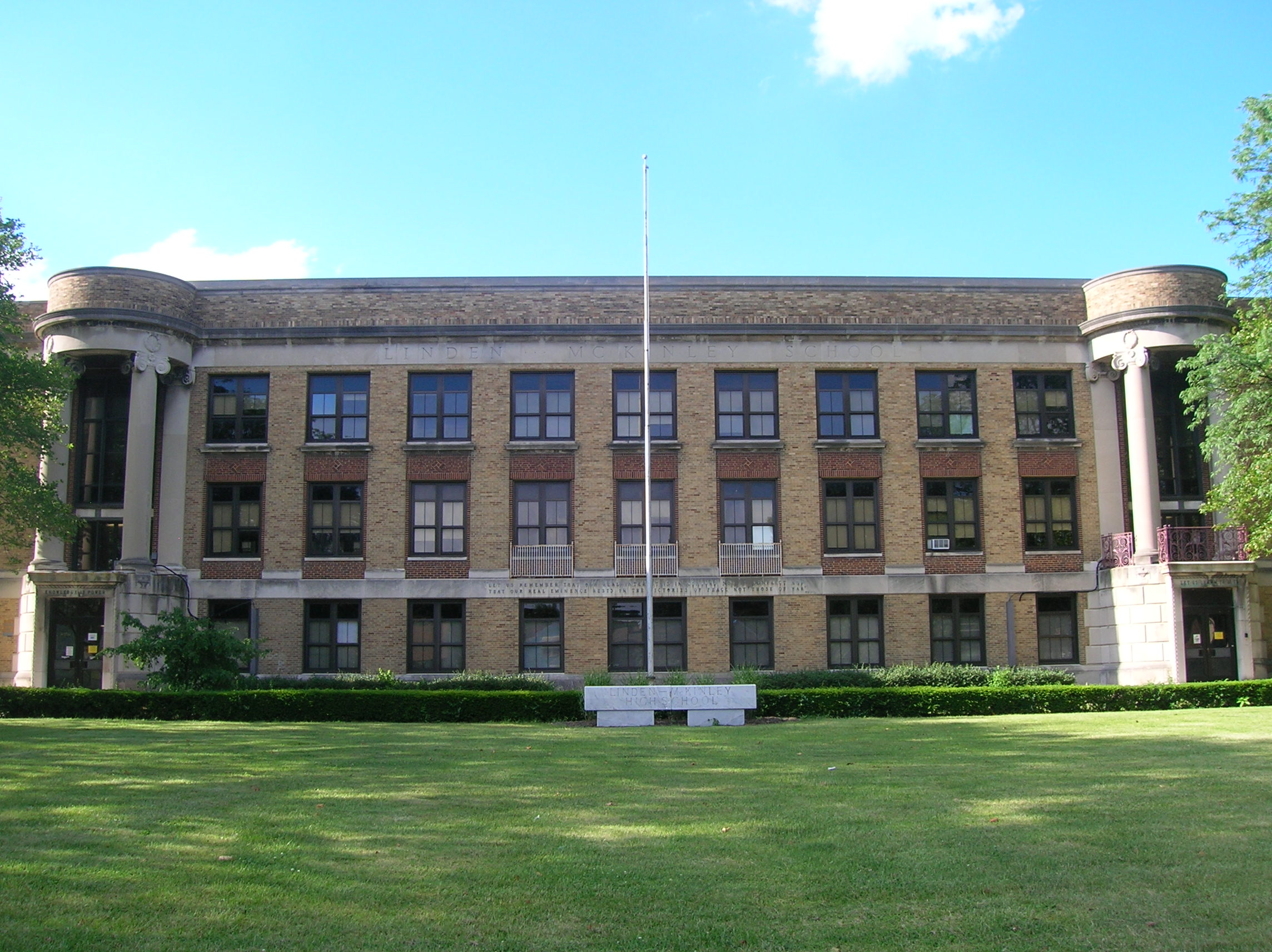

Location
- 1320 Duxberry Avenue; Columbus, Ohio, (Franklin County) 43211; United States
- Coordinates: 40°0′35″N 82°58′26″W

Information
- Type: Public, Coeducational high school
- School district: Columbus City Schools
- Superintendent: Angela Chapman
- Principal: Michael McCrory
- Teaching staff: 38.00 (FTE)
- Grades: 7-12
- Enrollment: 757 (2023–2024)
- Student to teacher ratio: 19.92
- Colors: Maroon and white
- Athletics conference: Columbus City League
- Mascot: Panther
- Team name: Panthers
- Accreditation: North Central Association of Colleges and Schools
- Website: lmsa.ccsoh.us

Linden McKinley High School is located in the South Linden neighborhood of Columbus, Ohio and is part of the Columbus City Schools District. The school has an enrollment of approximately 500 students in grades 9 to 12.

Currently Linden McKinley maintains advanced placement courses in: English literature, English language, calculus, government and US history. In addition Kenyon College classes in English and Biology are held on site for dual credit. In 2018, it was recommended for conversion to a middle school, as most students in its catchment area attend other high schools.

== Athletic State Championships ==
- Boys Basketball - 1967,1975,1982
- Boys Track and Field – 1977

== Notable alumni ==
- Cedric Brown
- Ken Byers
- Jim Cleamons
- Buster Douglas
- Mike Holloway
- Hilmer Kenty
- Jerry Page
- William Thomas, Jr.

== See also ==
- Schools in Columbus, Ohio
