= Columbus Alternative High School =

Public high school in Columbus, Ohio, United States

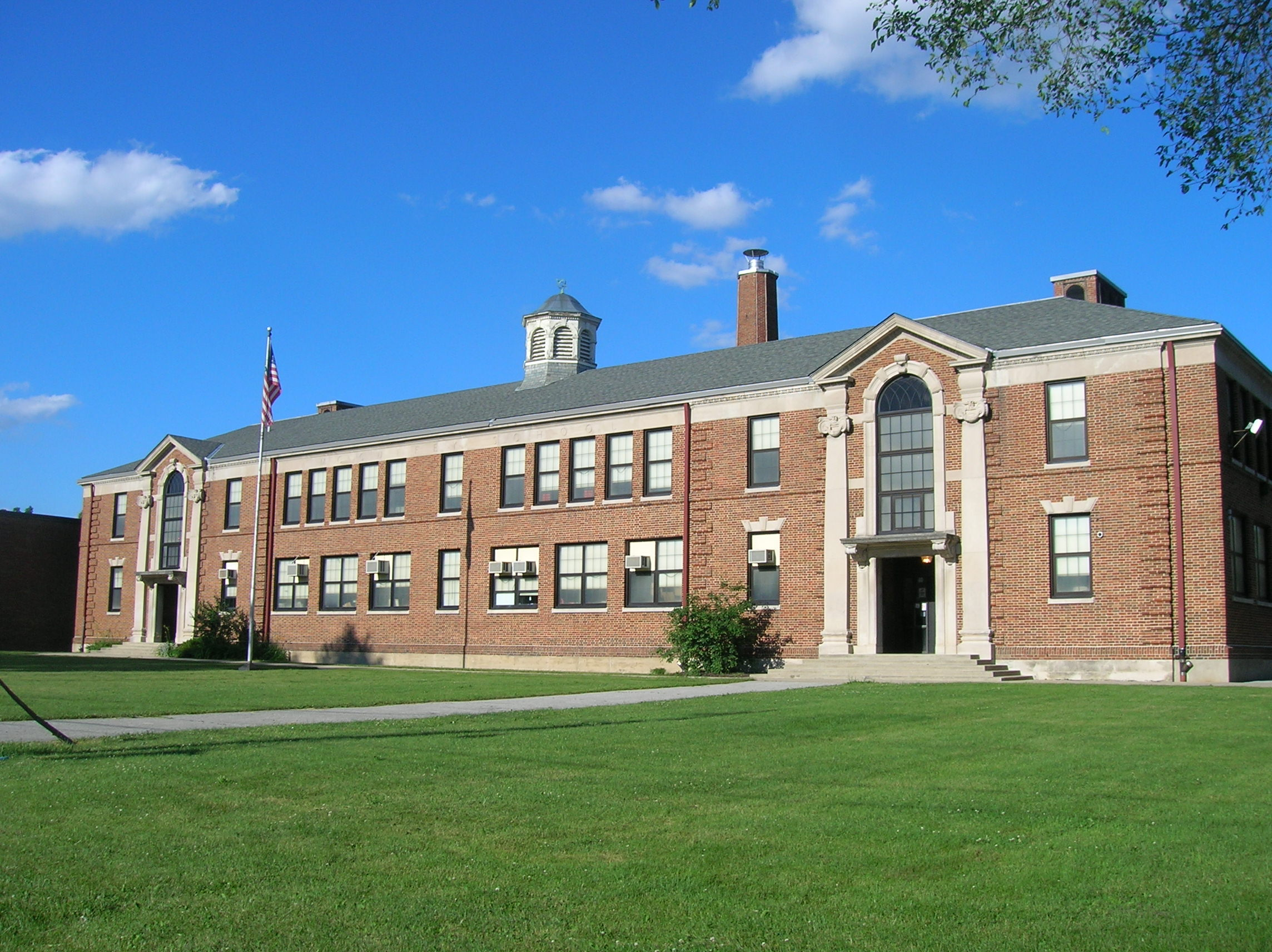

Location
- 2632 McGuffey Road; Columbus, (Franklin County), Ohio 43211; United States
- Coordinates: 40°1′10″N 82°58′50″W

Information
- Type: Public, coeducational high school
- Established: 1978
- School district: Columbus City Schools
- CEEB code: 361-526
- Principal: Interim: Ms. Michelle Lewis
- Grades: 9-12
- Slogan: Transcend the Mundane; Excellence is the Standard, Not the Exception
- Song: Anthem to CAHS
- Mascot: Pegasus
- Nickname: CAHS
- Accreditation: North Central Association of Colleges and Schools
- Publication: Shades
- Newspaper: The CAHS Gorgon
- Website: cahs.ccsoh.us

Columbus Alternative High School is a public high school in the Columbus City Schools district located in the area known as North Linden, in Columbus, Ohio. The school is a magnet school for college-bound students in Columbus, with both AP and IB programs.

While most Columbus City schools are assigned a neighborhood to whose residents they guarantee admission, places at CAHS are available exclusively through the district's school lottery, which admits 250 freshmen to the school each year. There are also waiting list for each grade that allows students to enter as spots open up throughout the program/school year.

The school is often referred to by its abbreviation, CAHS (pronounced "cause") and the students are CAHS-mic scholars. The school's mascot is Pegasus of Greek mythology.

== Academics ==
CAHS students participate in an internship program beginning their junior year. The program, which fulfills the community-service requirements of the district, is designed to provide real-world experience. Students choose their own sponsors, who range from local artisans to politicians to teachers. Students report to their site on Wednesdays in place of attending classes.

As of the 2005–2006 school year, CAHS has offered an International Baccalaureate diploma program for 11th and 12th graders.

All high school students are required to take at least one AP, IB, or post secondary course before their graduation regardless of which track they are pursuing for graduation.

== History ==
The Columbus Alternative High School was conceived in 1977, initially as part of a plan to save the original Columbus North High School, now Columbus International High School from closure.

As part of its plan to comply with a 1977 court order to desegregate Columbus high schools, the Columbus Board of Education had announced that many students would be bussed to other neighborhoods beginning in the fall of 1978, and that certain schools, including North High School, would be closed.

A group of teachers, led by would-be principal Timothy Ilg, proposed a new magnet school to occupy the North High School building, featuring independent study and a rigorous curriculum. Nearly 700 students (mostly freshmen and sophomores) from around metropolitan Columbus applied for entry. Then, in the summer of 1978, a temporary stay was placed on the court order. The desegregation plan was postponed, North High School was saved, and the CAHS plan was shelved.

That summer, a call went out to all applicants interested in saving the alternative school idea. Since the majority of applicants and teachers had been from the North High School neighborhood, fewer than 75 applicants and families expressed interest. However, then Ilg sought and obtained assurances from the Columbus Board of Education that if he could recruit 100 students and funding via outside grants, space would be provided for the school.

In the fall of 1978, with enough money to operate for only one semester, and a reported enrollment of exactly 100 students, the Columbus Alternative High School opened as a half-day program on the third floor of Mohawk Elementary School in downtown Columbus. CAHS students spent their mornings at Mohawk Elementary and were bussed to their neighborhood schools in the afternoons for science and physical education programs. As a half-day program, CAHS was not able to grant diplomas to its eight seniors.

The following year, enrollment surpassed 100 students, and CAHS was moved to the top floor of McGuffey Elementary School (now closed), where the half-day program again shared space with a grade school. In 1980, bolstered by a number of high-profile academic awards and a growing reputation for excellence, requests for enrollment surged, and the school received a $300,000 federal grant, permitting it to expand and become a full-time program. The first CAHS diplomas were granted to the class of 1981.

== Sports ==
- Historically, CAHS has not fielded sports teams per se but students have the option to participate in the sport teams at their "home-school" (where they would have attended based on their neighborhood).
- Beginning in 2009, CAHS had an Ultimate Frisbee team (DIESEL) started by K. Libertino, G. Anderson, J. Nguyen, and J. Elick, that played in the Central Ohio Ultimate League, although this team has since disbanded.
- CAHS also fields a nationally rated chess team, as well as "In The Know" and Robotics teams.

== Accomplishments ==
- Columbus Alternative High School is ranked #630 in the National Rankings.
- Columbus Alternative High School is ranked 23rd in the State of Ohio.
- Columbus Alternative High School is ranked 6th in the Columbus, OH Metro Area High Schools.
- Columbus Alternative High School is ranked #1 in Columbus City School District High Schools.
- Columbus Alternative High School has received a silver medal from U.S. News & World Report magazine as one of the nation's top high schools.
- Columbus Alternative High School has earned the Central Region Triple Crown Award from the Ohio School Boards Association.
- The only high school of 300 in the 14-county central region to be honored by Newsweek and U.S. News & World Report
- Designated by the Ohio Department of Education as a School of Promise for three consecutive years.
- The College Board recognized Columbus Alternative High School as one of seven schools in the country for the advancement of higher level math and science for minority students.
- Over ninety percent of CAHS graduates attend college, and each graduating class has earned millions of dollars in scholarships.

== National chess champions ==
- CAHS chess teams have won eleven consecutive city and state championships from 1998 to 2010.
- In December 2008, CAHS's four-member senior chess team won the 12th Grade National Chess Championship title at the National Grade Level Chess Championship in Orlando, Florida.
- These same players had won the 10th Grade National Chess Championship two years earlier, making this the second National Chess Championship for the same team.

== See also ==
- Schools in Columbus, Ohio
