= William Oxley Thompson Memorial Library =

Main library at Ohio State University in Columbus, Ohio, US

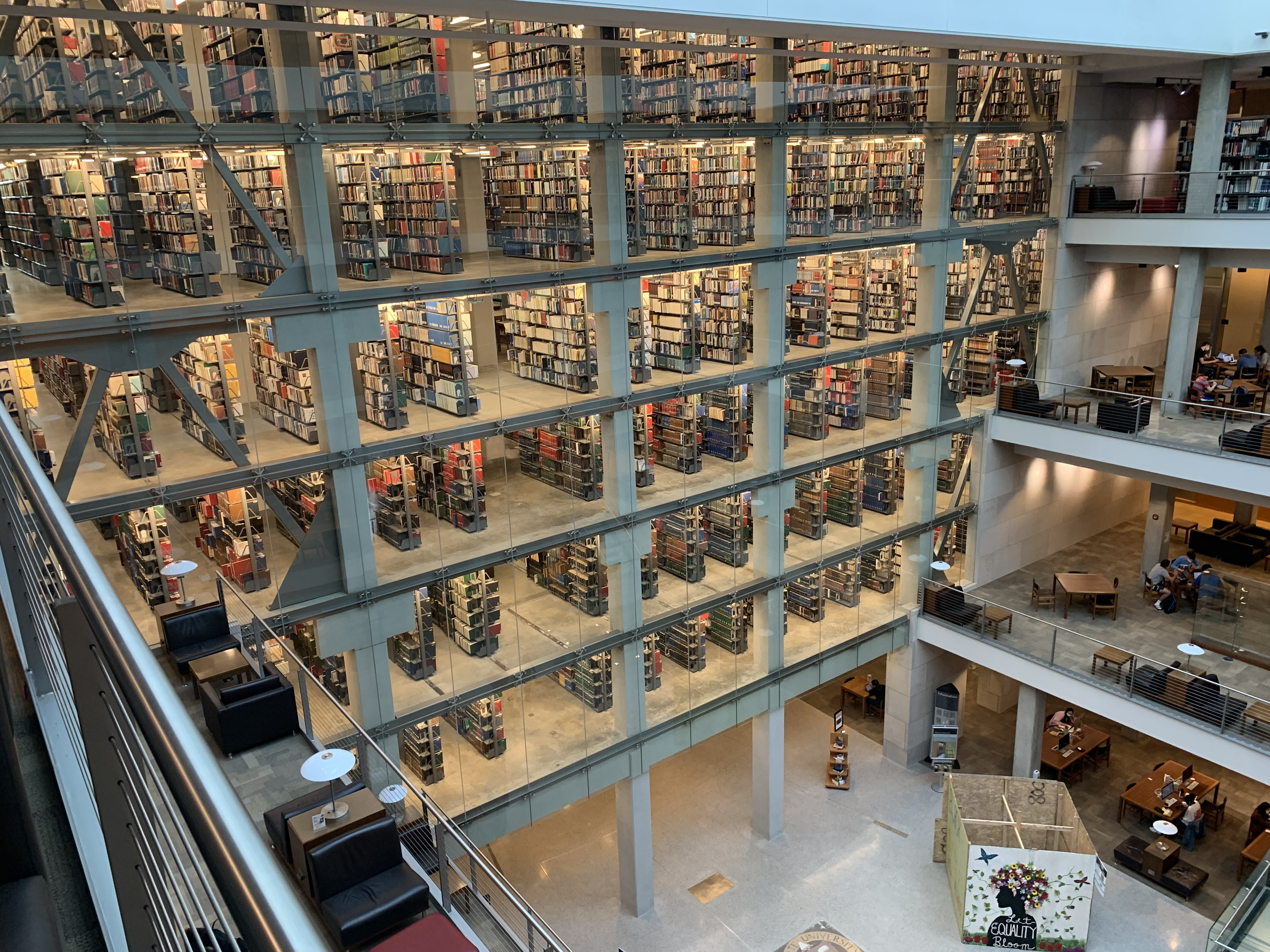
- Thompson Library East Atrium
- 39.99925°N 83.01485°W
- Location: Columbus, Ohio, United States
- Type: Academic
- Established: 1913
- Branch of: Ohio State University Libraries

Collection
- Size: 1.25 million (on-site)

Other information
- Public transit access: 1, 2, 8, 22, 31, Night Owl
- Website: Thompson Library

The William Oxley Thompson Memorial Library (commonly referred to as the Thompson Library) is the main library at Ohio State University's Columbus campus. It is the university's largest library and houses its main stacks, special collections, rare books and manuscripts, and many departmental subject libraries. The library was originally built in 1912, and was renovated in 1951, 1977, and 2009. It is named in honor of the university's fifth president, William Oxley Thompson.

== Library information ==
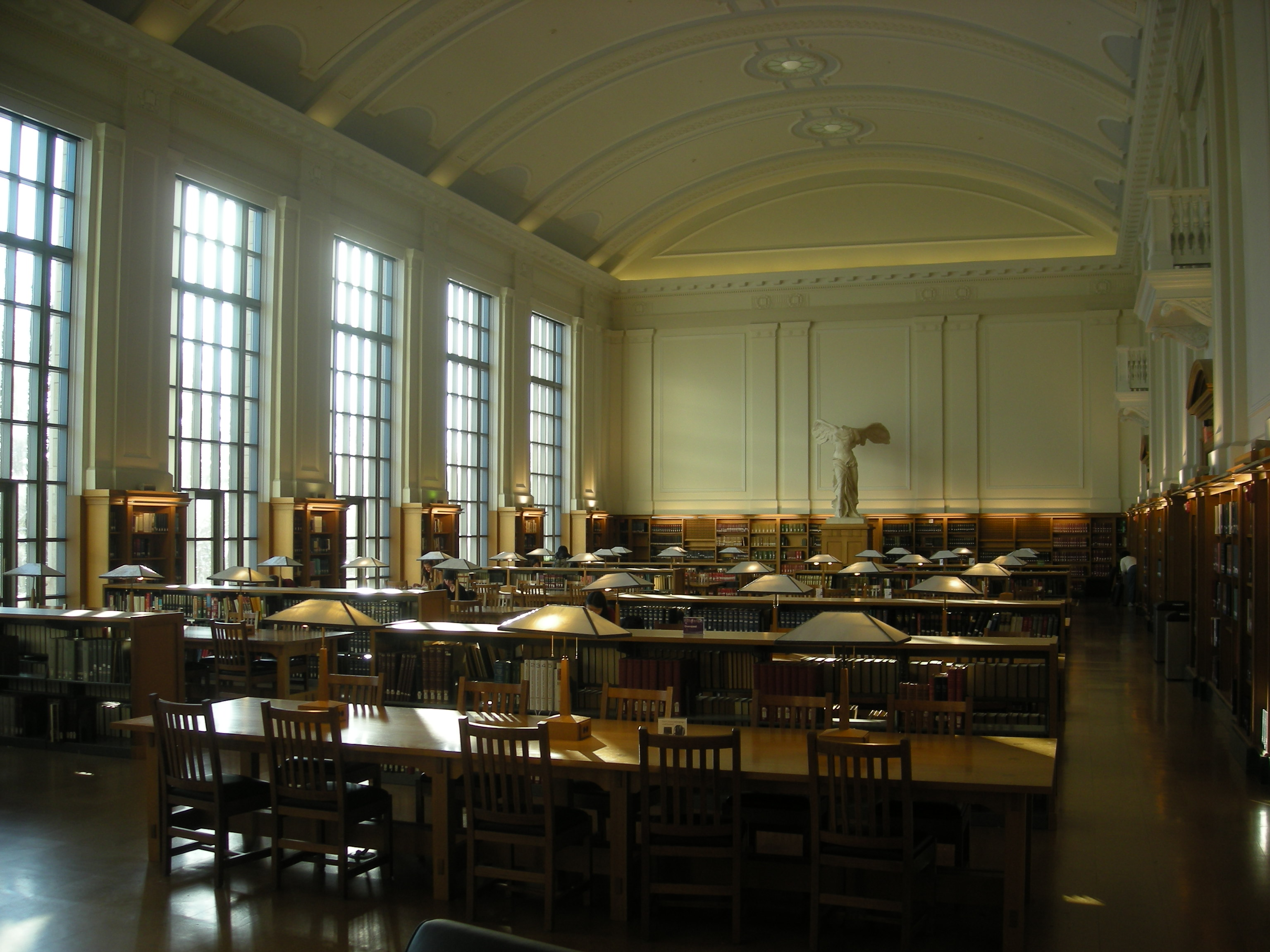
Grand Reading Room with replica of Winged Victory of Samothrace statue

The Ohio State University's University Libraries manages 15 locations on the Columbus campus, of which the Thompson Library is the largest. In addition to housing the main stacks and serving as the central research library for the entire campus, the Thompson Library is home to many of the subject libraries in the humanities and social sciences, as well as reference, special collections, rare books and manuscripts, journals, and general interest periodicals. Departmental subject libraries include literature, foreign language by region, linguistics, philosophy, religion, theater, anthropology, history, sociology, and political science. Some subject libraries, such as science and engineering, architecture, agriculture, fine arts, law, health sciences, veterinary sciences, and geology, are housed in the university's other libraries.

Of the system's 5.8 million volumes, the Thompson Library holds about 1.25 million volumes, including 250,000 special collections volumes. Additional book storage is provided by the university's off-site Book Depository, which also houses the University Archives.

== History ==
=== Background ===
When The Ohio State University opened in 1873, the library was located on the first floor of University Hall. In 1884, it was moved to the building's third floor, and in 1893 it was moved to the newly constructed Orton Hall. As early as 1897, university librarians voiced their need for a dedicated library building, and this eventually resulted in the construction of the Main Library (as the Thompson Library was originally known) in 1910.

=== Original building ===
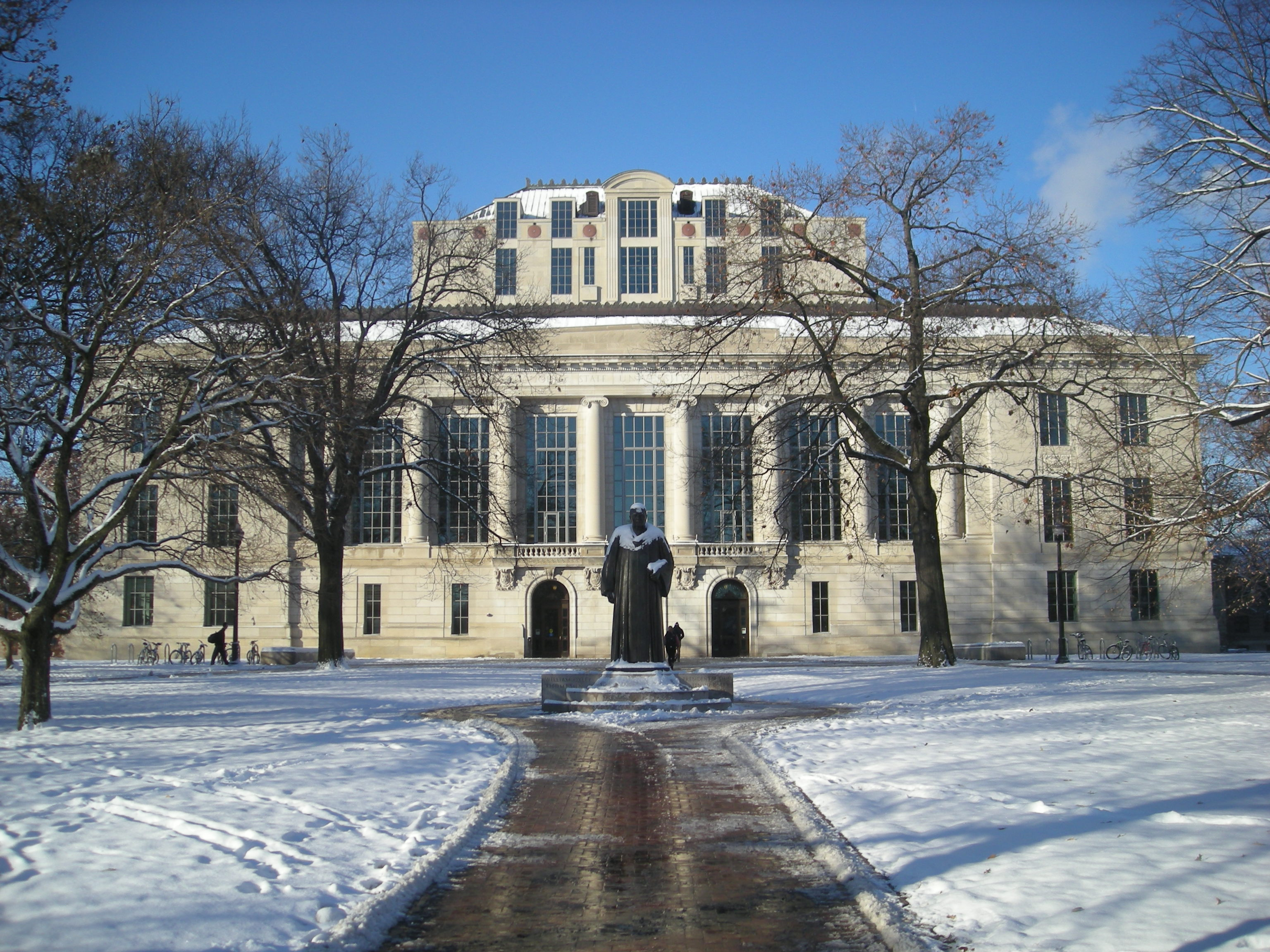
Original east facade with 1951 tower above

The original Beaux-Arts library building was built between 1910 and 1912. In 1910, the architectural firm Allen & Collens of Boston was selected through a design competition. Later that year, the architects submitted a formal proposal, which was accepted by OSU's Board of Trustees, and then a call for bids was put out for construction. Ground was broken on December 23, 1910, and construction was completed two years later on December 18, 1912. Following completion, books were moved, and the library was officially open to the university community on January 6, 1913. Since the initial construction, the library has been renovated three times, in 1951, 1977, and 2009.

=== 1951 and 1977 expansions ===
The library's first expansion was built in 1947–1951. A 10-story tower was constructed for the library stacks, and single-story extensions were built north and south of the east facade. It was completed on June 2, 1951. In the same year, the Main Library was renamed the William Oxley Thompson Memorial Library in honor of the university's fifth president, William Oxley Thompson, who was in office when the original building was built.

The library was again expanded in the 1970s, when a modern addition was built to extend the west wing. It was completed on January 5, 1977.

=== 2009 renovation and expansion ===
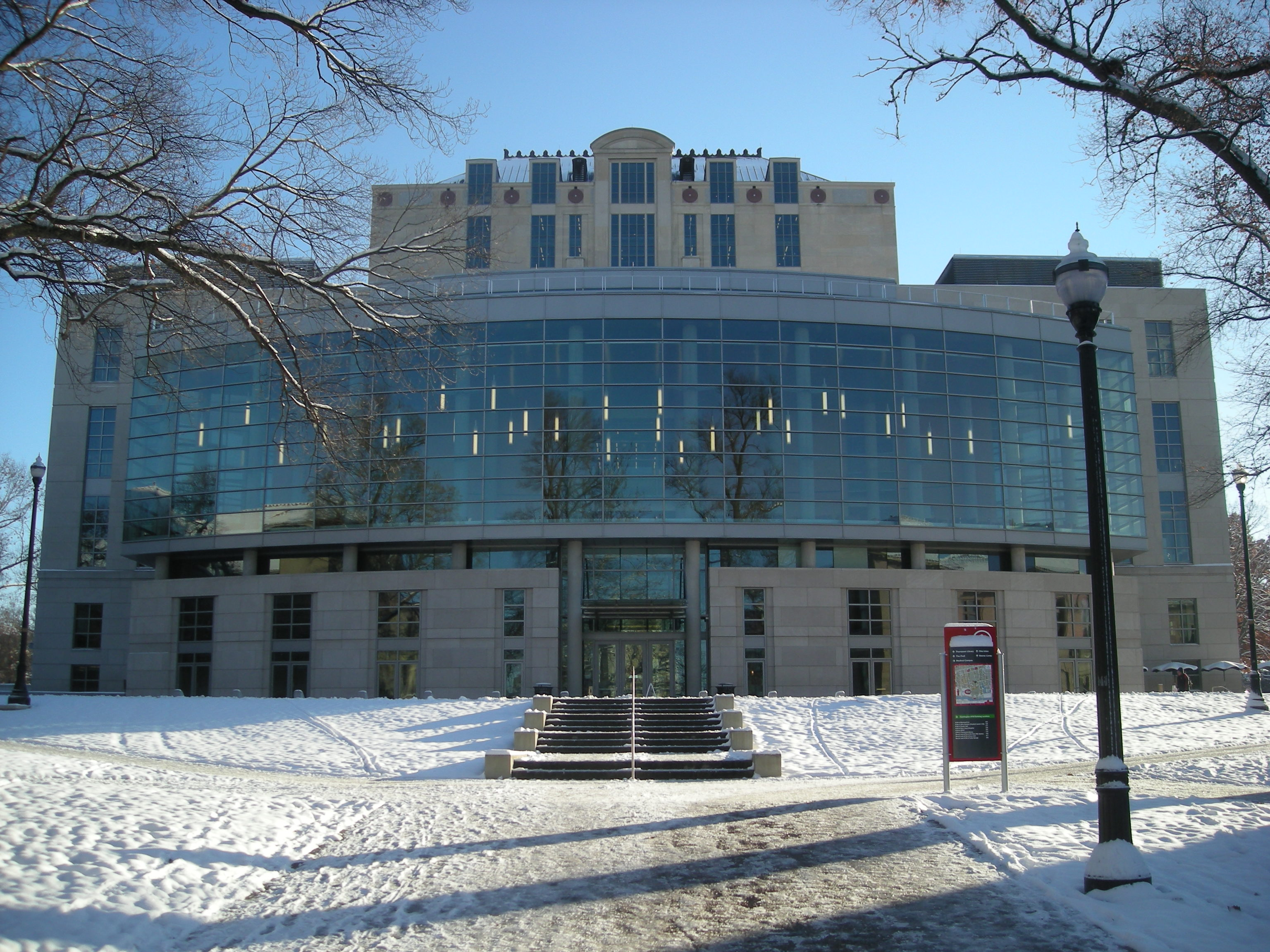
West facade, built during the 2009 renovation

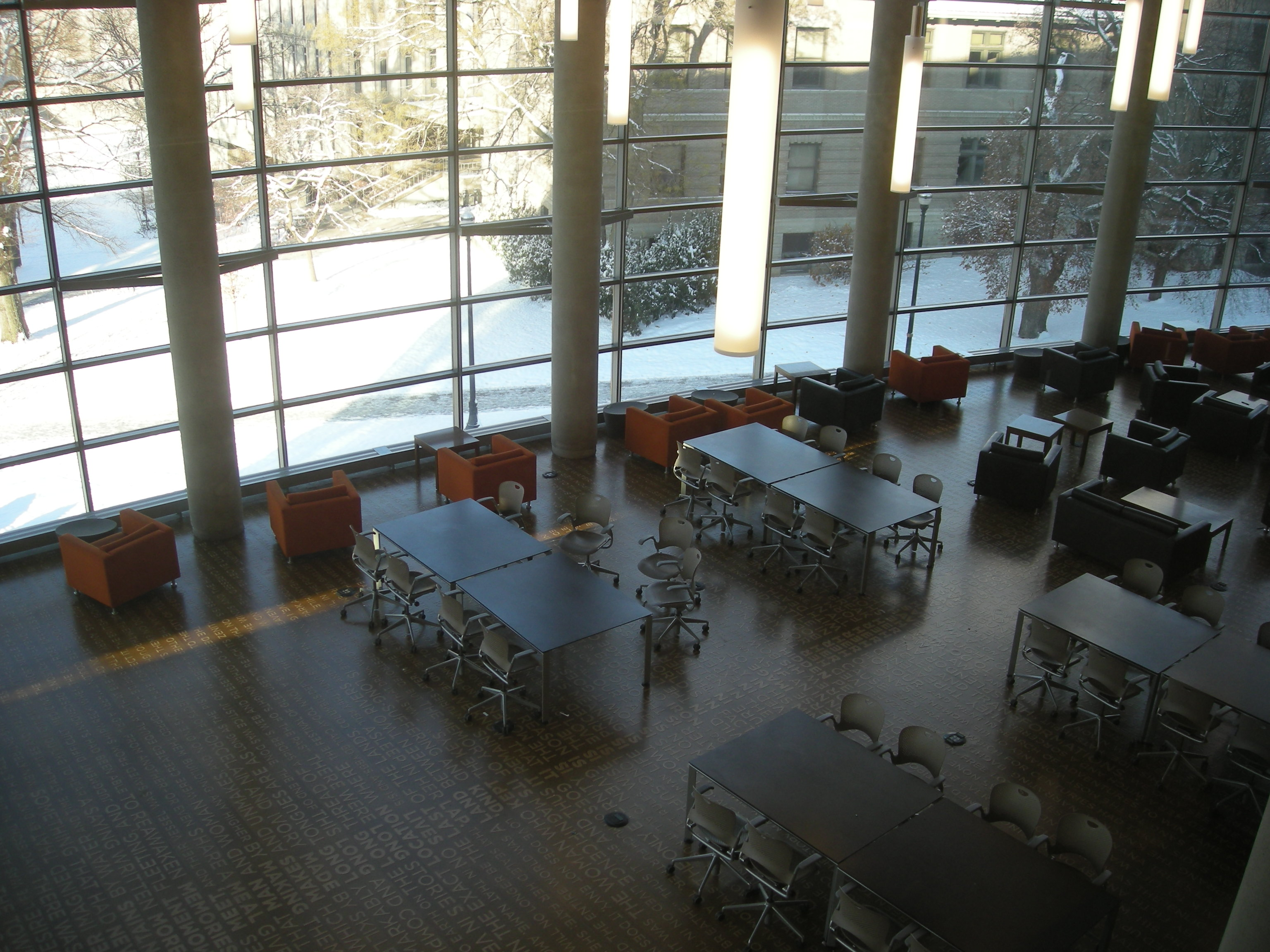
Buckeye Reading Room, part of the 2009 renovation

The most recent renovation to the Thompson Library was a $108.7 million project that began on January 10, 2007, and was completed in the summer of 2009. It was designed by the Gund Partnership with Acock Associates Architects as the architect of record. The library's original east facade and Grand Reading Room were restored, while the 1977 west wing addition and 1951 north and south extensions were demolished. A new 91,000 sq ft (8,500 m^{2}) west wing was built, bringing the library floor space to 306,000 sq ft (28,400 m^{2}). Nearly 1000 seats were added to the library, but shelf space was decreased, so many volumes were moved to other locations. The renovation focused on opening up the library space to natural light and creating a more coherent space. Features added in the renovation include a new West Atrium and Buckeye Reading Room, glass walls for the lower floors of the 1951 book tower, exhibition space for the library's special collections, a café, and a ground-floor east–west passageway that extends the Oval's "Long Walk" through the building. The renovation was opened to the public on September 24, 2009.

Various art pieces were included in the restoration. The written-word piece VERSE was installed on the floor of the Buckeye Reading Room, and 49 metal plates called "Foundation Stones" were set throughout the library, featuring engravings in a wide range of writing and graphic notation systems. Additionally, a new replica of the Winged Victory of Samothrace statue was commissioned and installed in the Grand Reading Room to replace an earlier replica from 1913 which had fallen into disrepair and was removed in 1959.

The 2009 renovation received several awards, including a 2009 AIA Columbus Merit Award, a 2009 ABC Excellence in Construction Eagle Award, a 2009 Columbus Landmarks Foundation James B. Recchie Design Award, a 2010 SCUP/AIA-CAE Excellence in Architecture Renovation/Adaptive Reuse Special Citation, and a 2011 AIA/ALA Library Building Award.
