= List of public art in Columbus, Ohio =

List of public artworks in Columbus, Ohio, U.S.

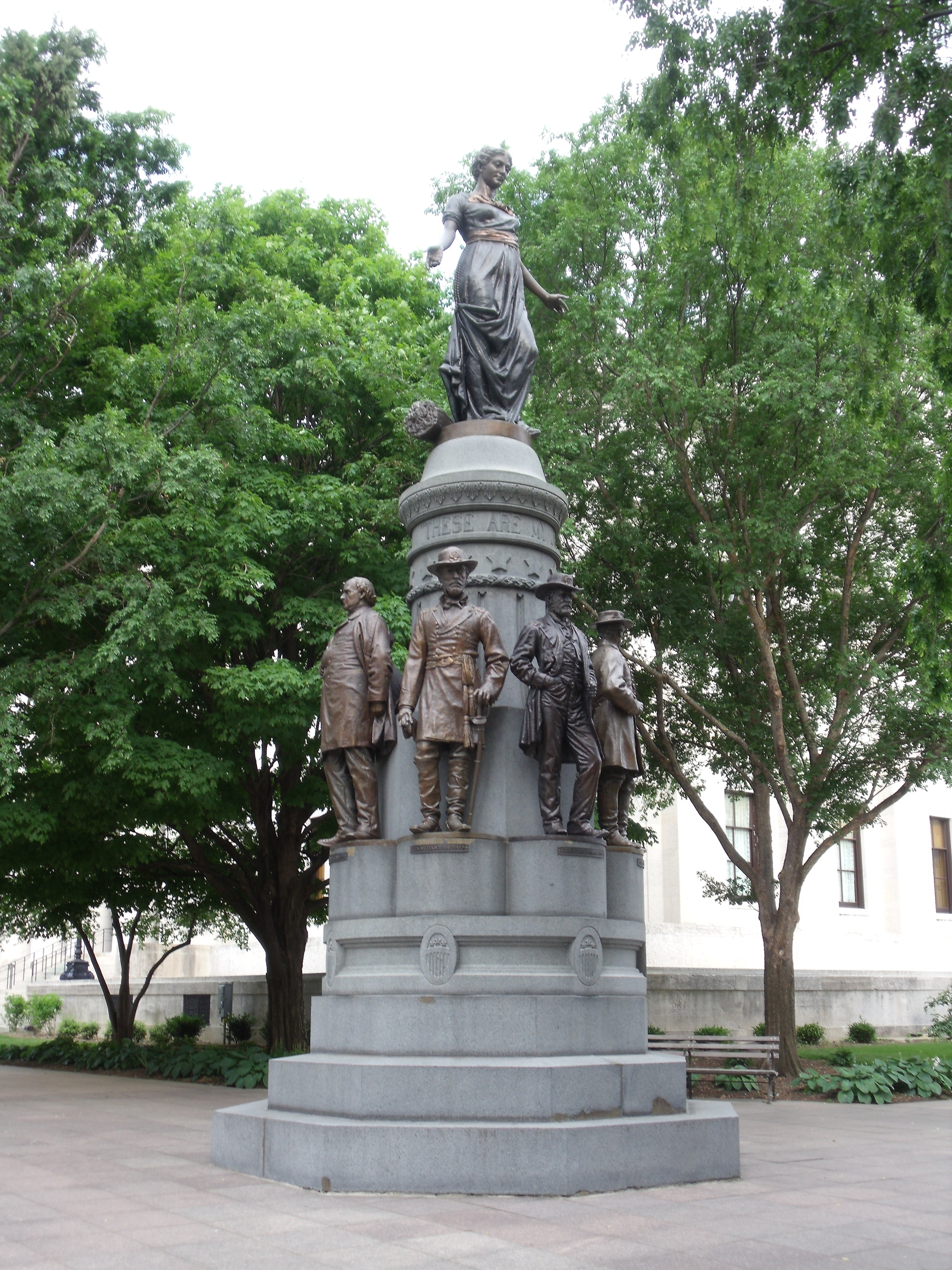
These Are My Jewels

Columbus, Ohio has an extensive public art collection.

== Works ==
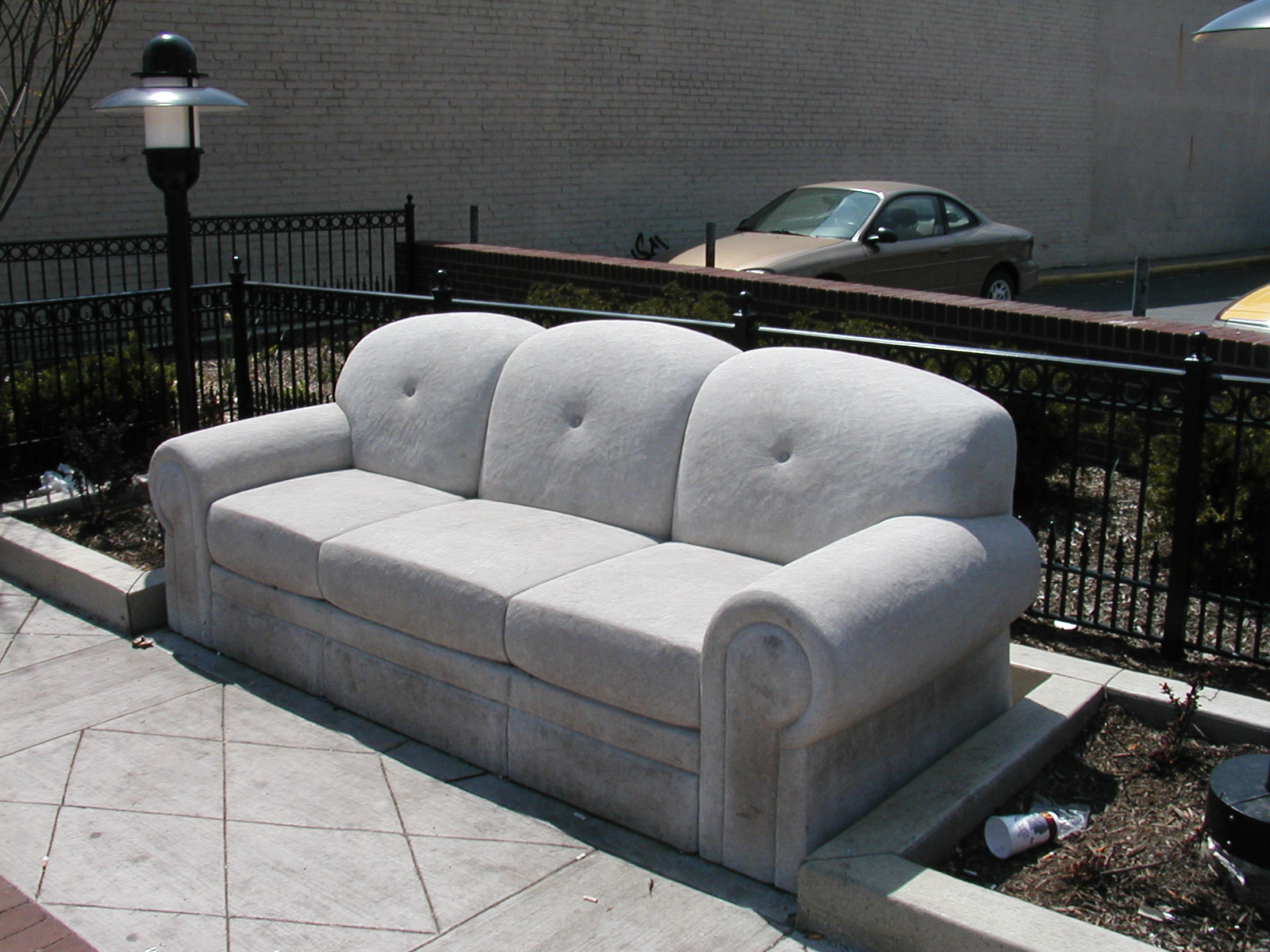
Greenwood Park Sofa in 2005

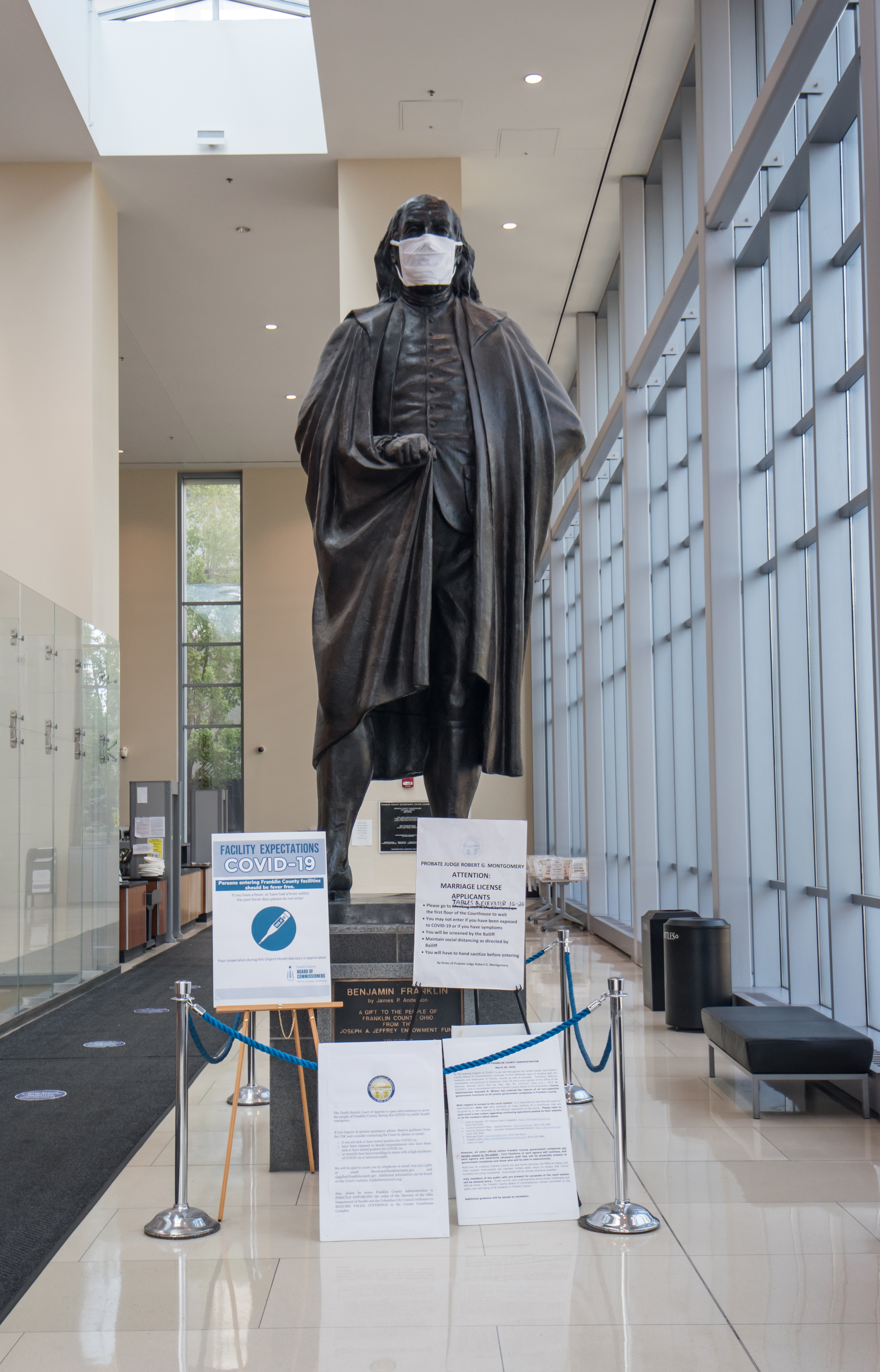
Statue of Benjamin Franklin

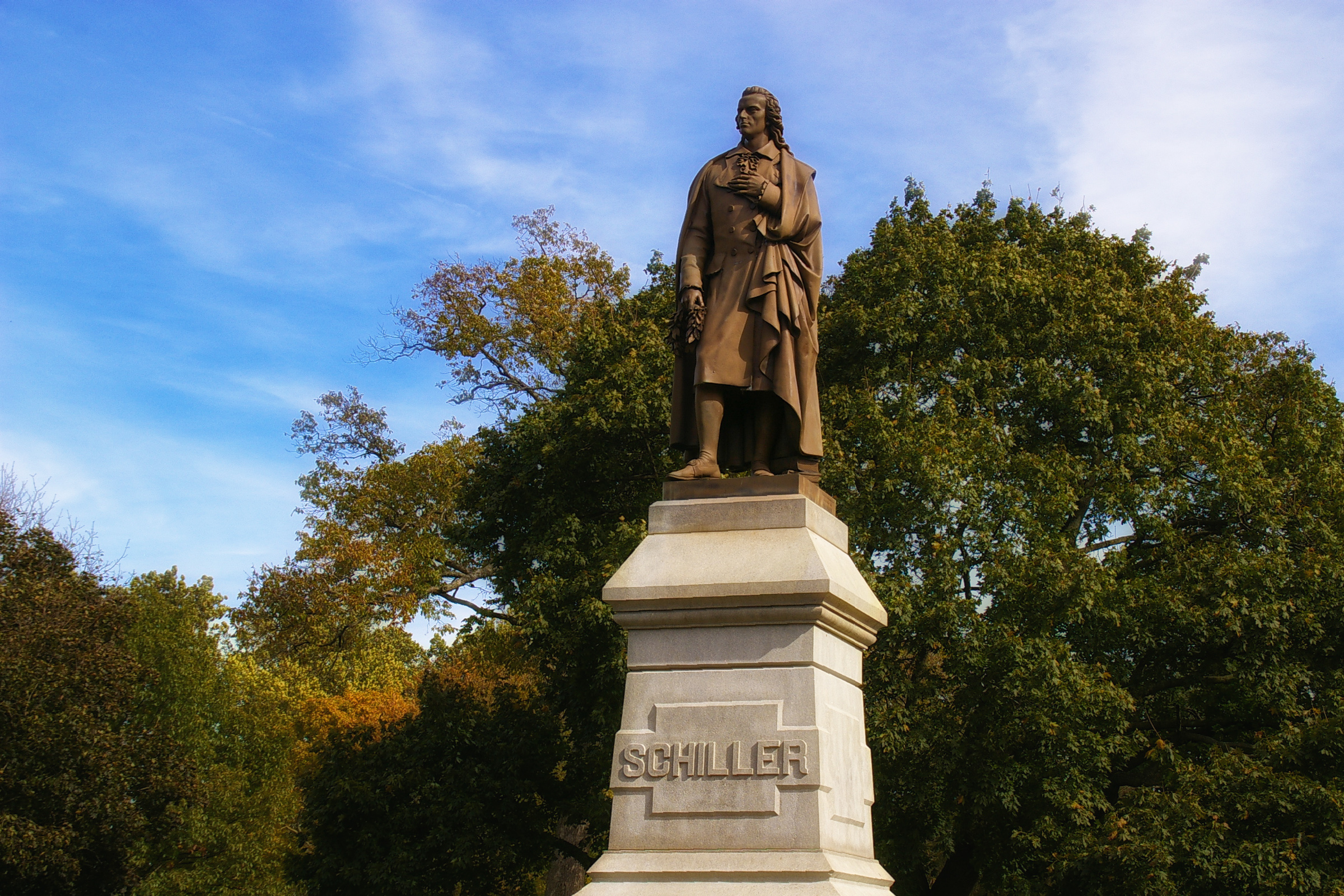
Statue of Friedrich Schiller

- ART (1999), Columbus College of Art and Design
- Arvin J. Alexander Memorial (1991), Alexander AEP Park
- Breaker (1982), Ohio State University
- Celebration for a Champion (1984), Ohio State University
- Celebration of Life (2004), Genoa Park
- Charles Benton Flagg Memorial (c. 1901), Goodale Park
- Columbus Firefighters Memorial (1958), Battelle Riverfront Park
- Columbus Police Memorial (2000), Genoa Park
- Correlation: Two White Line Diagonals and Two Arcs with a Sixteen-Foot Radius (1978), Bricker Federal Building
- Current
- Dr. Samuel Mitchel Smith and Sons Memorial Fountain (1880), Wexner Medical Center
- The Family of Man: Figure 2, Ancestor II (1970), Columbus Museum of Art
- The Father of Columbus Baseball (2009), Huntington Park
- Flowing Kiss (2013), North Bank Park
- Freedom (1985), Battelle Riverfront Park
- Gavel (2008), Ohio Judicial Center
- Goodale Park Fountain, Goodale Park
- Governor James A. Rhodes (1982), Rhodes State Office Tower
- Greenwood Park Sofa (2004), Cultural Arts Center
- James W. Barney Pickaweekee Story Grove (1992), Battelle Riverfront Park
- Hare on Ball and Claw (1990), Columbus Museum of Art
- Intermediate Model for the Arch (1975), Columbus Museum of Art
- Intersect (1992), Broad and High streets
- Lincoln Goodale Monument (1888), Goodale Park
- Naiads (1984), Capitol Square skyscraper
- Nationwide Fountain, One Nationwide Plaza
- NavStar '92 (1991), Franklin Park Conservatory
- The Newsboy (2018), 8 East Broad Street
- Out of There (1974), Columbus Museum of Art
- Oval with Points, Dorrian Commons Park
- Peter Pan (1927), Main Library
- Philo Unit 6 and Twin Branch Unit 4 (1983), AEP Building
- Scioto Lounge (2014), Genoa Park
- Spanish–American War Memorial (1937), Battelle Riverfront Park
- Statue of Arnold Schwarzenegger (2012), Greater Columbus Convention Center
- Statue of Benjamin Franklin (1974), Franklin County Hall of Justice
- Statue of Friedrich Schiller (1891), Schiller Park
- Statue of Lucas Sullivant (2000), Genoa Park
- Statue of William Oxley Thompson (1930), Ohio State University
- Their Spirits Circle the Earth (1987), Battelle Riverfront Park
- Three-Piece Reclining Figure: Draped 1975 (1975), Columbus Museum of Art
- To Honor the Immigrants (1992), Battelle Riverfront Park
- Two Lines Up Excentric Variation VI (1977), Columbus Museum of Art
- Umbrella Girl (1996), Schiller Park
- Union Station Arch (1899), McFerson Commons
- Untitled (Falsetti) (1960), Columbus City Schools Administration Office
- Wasahaban (1978), Columbus Museum of Art

=== Works at the Ohio Statehouse ===
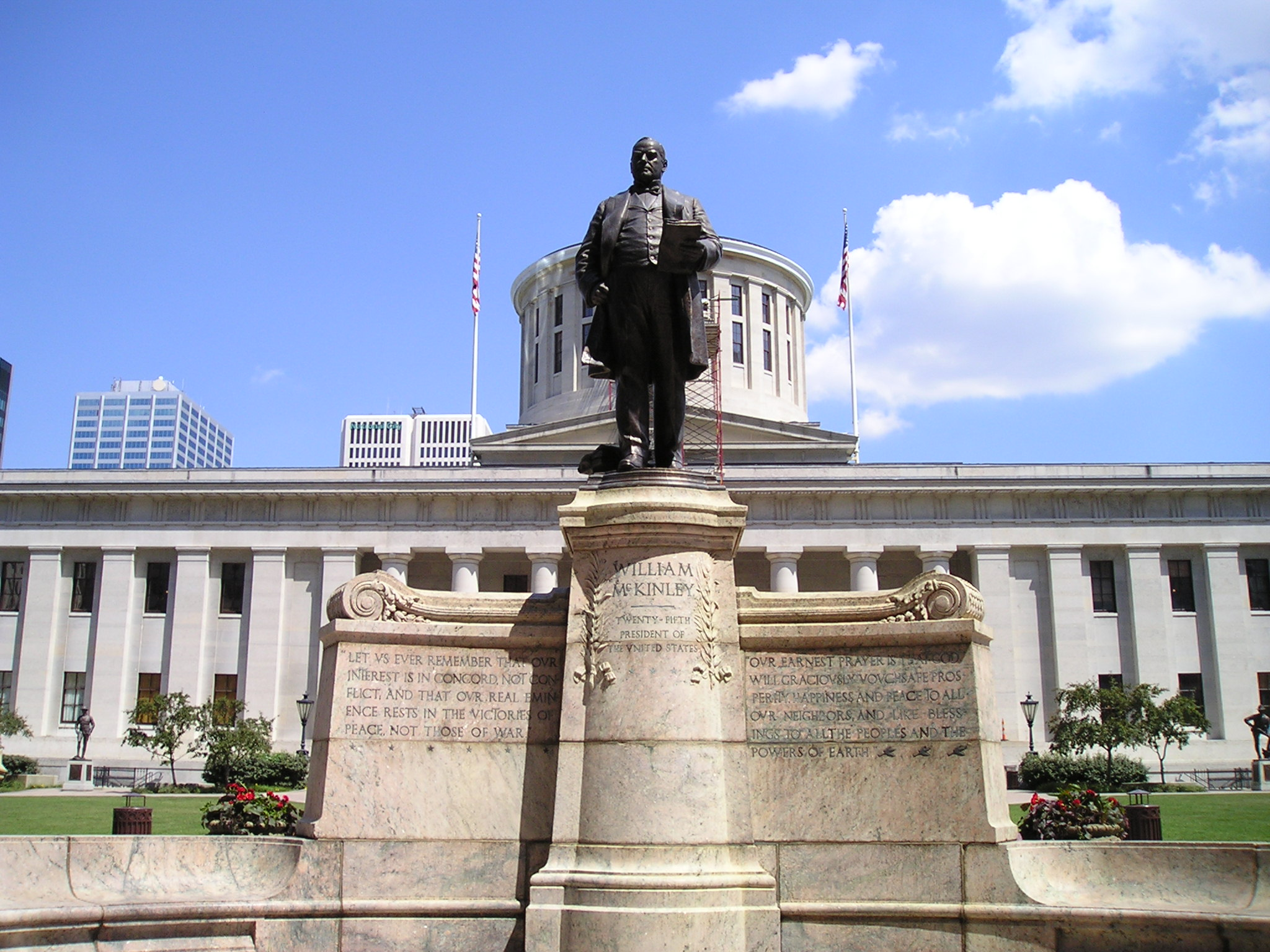
The William McKinley Monument

- The Doughboy (1930)
- Lincoln Vicksburg Monument (1865–71)
- Ohio Holocaust and Liberators Memorial (2014)
- Ohio Veterans Plaza (1996)
- Peace (1922)
- The Spirit of '98 (1928)
- Statue of Christopher Columbus (1892)
- These Are My Jewels (1893)
- William McKinley Monument (1906)

== Former works ==
- Statue of Christopher Columbus (1955), Columbus City Hall (no longer public)
- Statue of Christopher Columbus (1959), Columbus State Community College (no longer public)
- Union Station (1987)
- Trains (1989)
