= Stephen Canneto =

American artist

- Born: 1943 (age 82–83); Fort Monmouth, New Jersey

Stephen Frank Canneto (born 1943) is an American artist. He predominantly creates large-scale sculptures, many in Columbus, Ohio. Canneto was born in Fort Monmouth, New Jersey.

== Works ==
=== In Columbus, Ohio ===
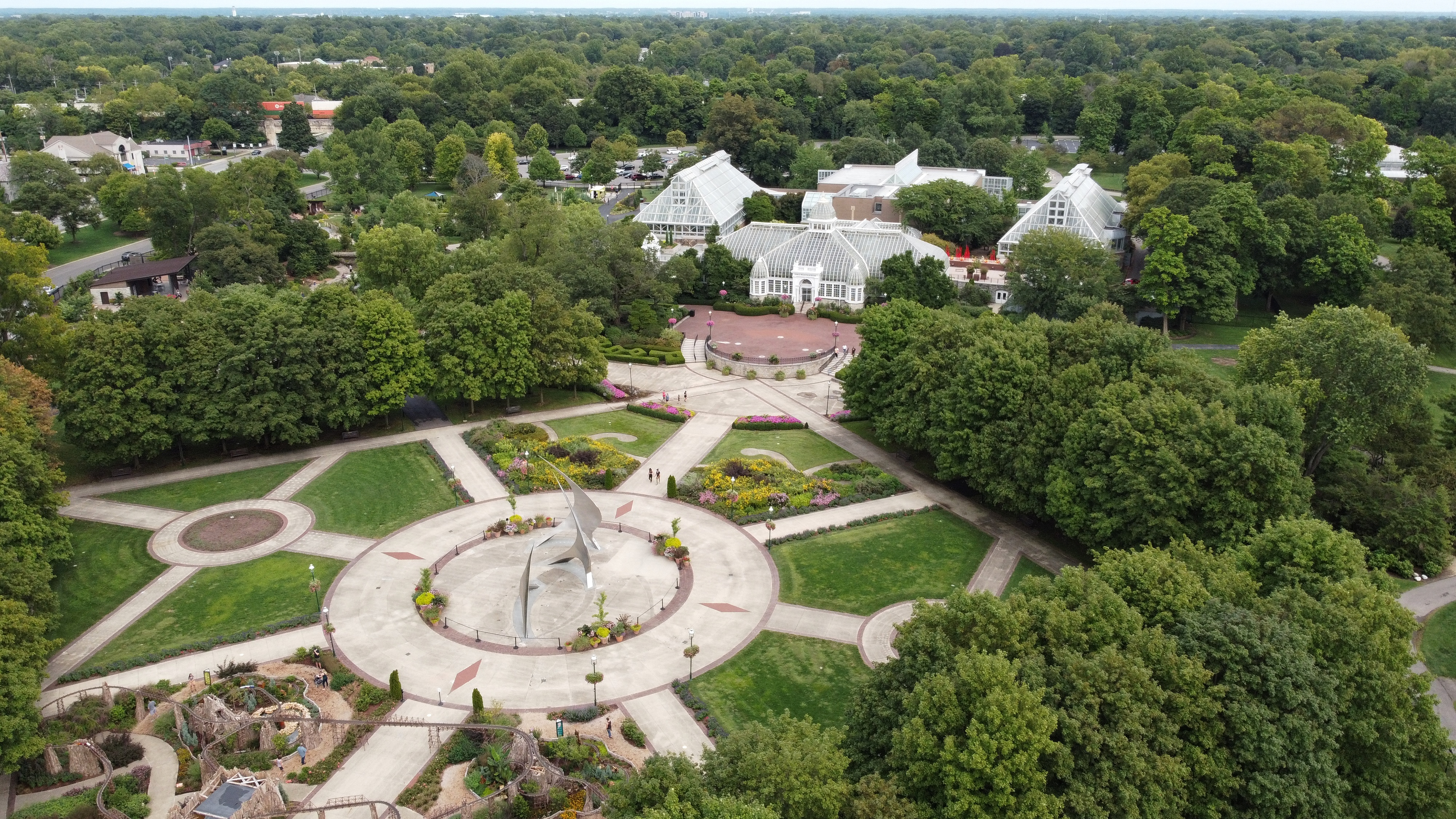
NavStar '92 is the centerpiece of the Franklin Park Conservatory's botanical garden

- Crossroads of Commerce at 250 E. Town Street
- Intersect, on Capitol Square
- NavStar '92, at the Franklin Park Conservatory
- Pray for Peace and Pieces to Pieces, at First Community Church
- Quest, at the Ohio Department of Education
- Shamash-Light Tower I, formerly outside Waterford Tower

=== Outside Columbus ===
- Spirit of Caring, in Coral Springs, Florida

== See also ==
- List of public art in Columbus, Ohio
