= Ohio Police and Fire Memorial Park =

Memorial and park in Columbus, Ohio, U.S.

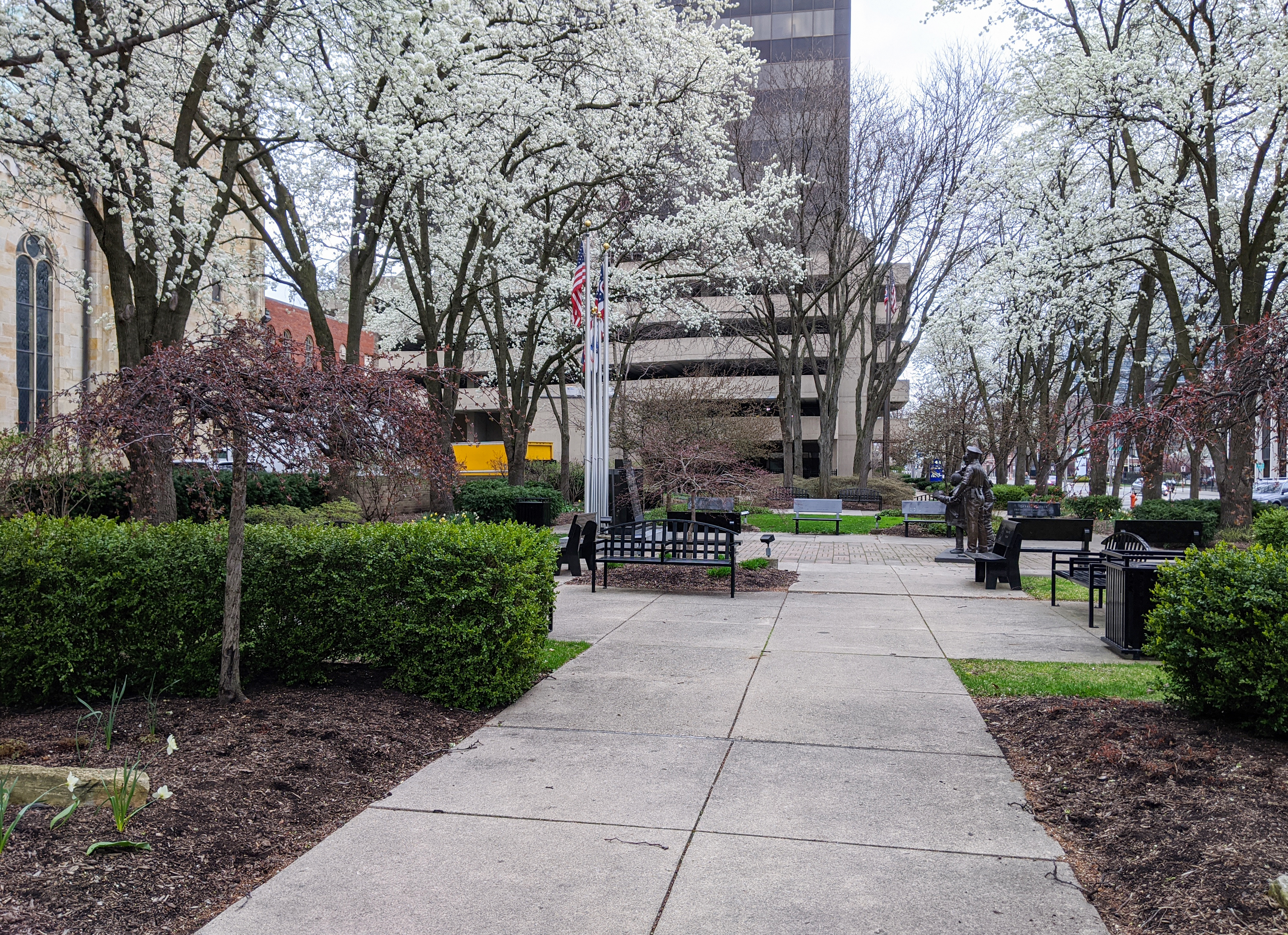
- The park in early spring
- Interactive map of Ohio Police and Fire Memorial Park
- Coordinates: 39°57′34″N 82°59′49″W
- Public transit: 3, 6, 8, 9, 11, 13, 51, 52, 61, 71, 72, 73, 74

Ohio Police and Fire Memorial Park is a memorial and park commemorating Ohio's police officers and firefighters, in Downtown Columbus, Ohio, United States. The park is north of Town St. just east of Third St. It features a sculpture by Ronald Dewey, engraved bricks, pavers, and benches.

== Sculpture ==
The Ohio Police and Firefighter Memorial features bronze sculptures of a fireman and firefighter with their hands on a child's back.

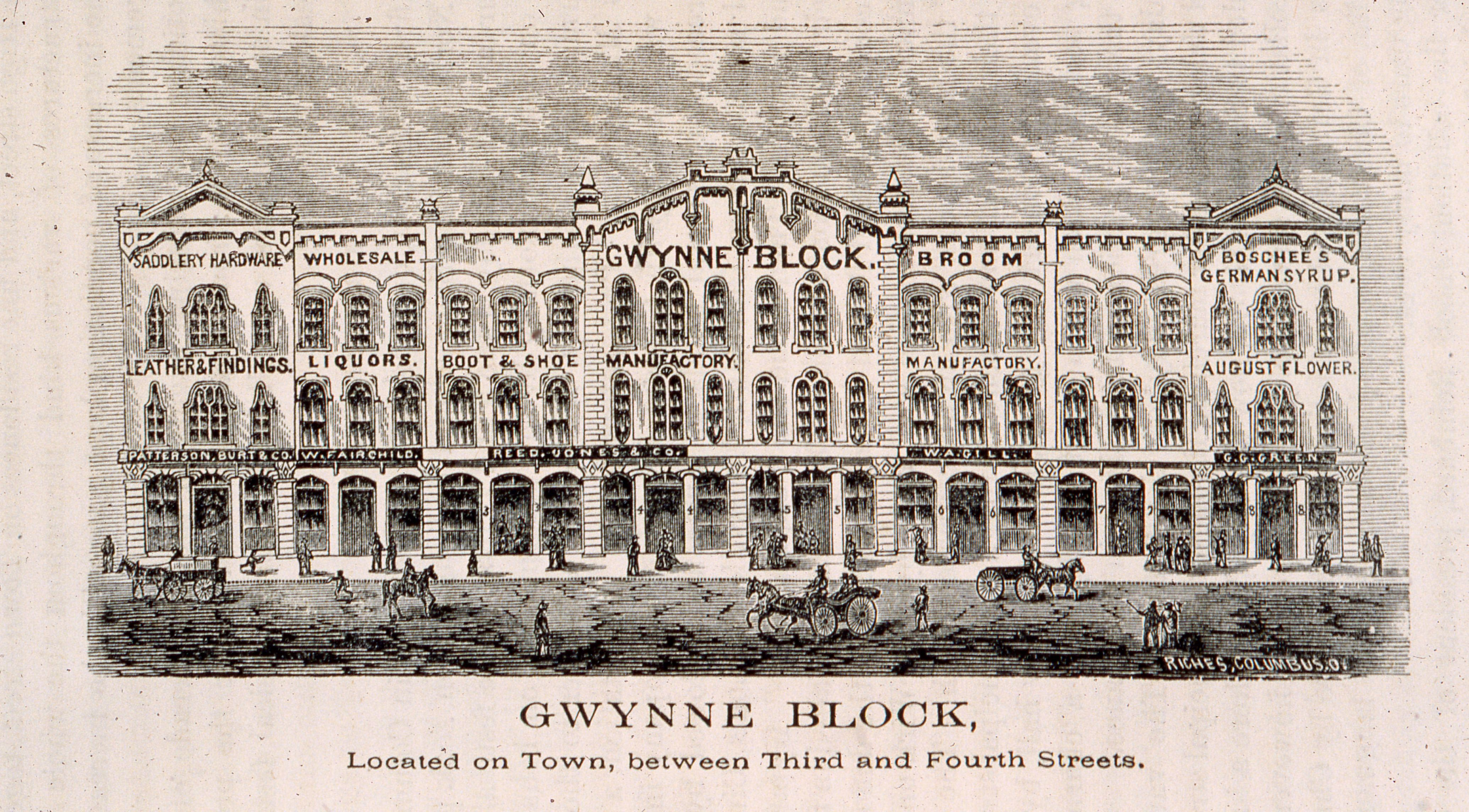
The Gwynne Block once stood on the park site

== See also ==
- Columbus Firefighters Memorial
- Columbus Police Memorial
