= Three-Piece Reclining Figure: Draped 1975 =

Sculpture series by Henry Moore

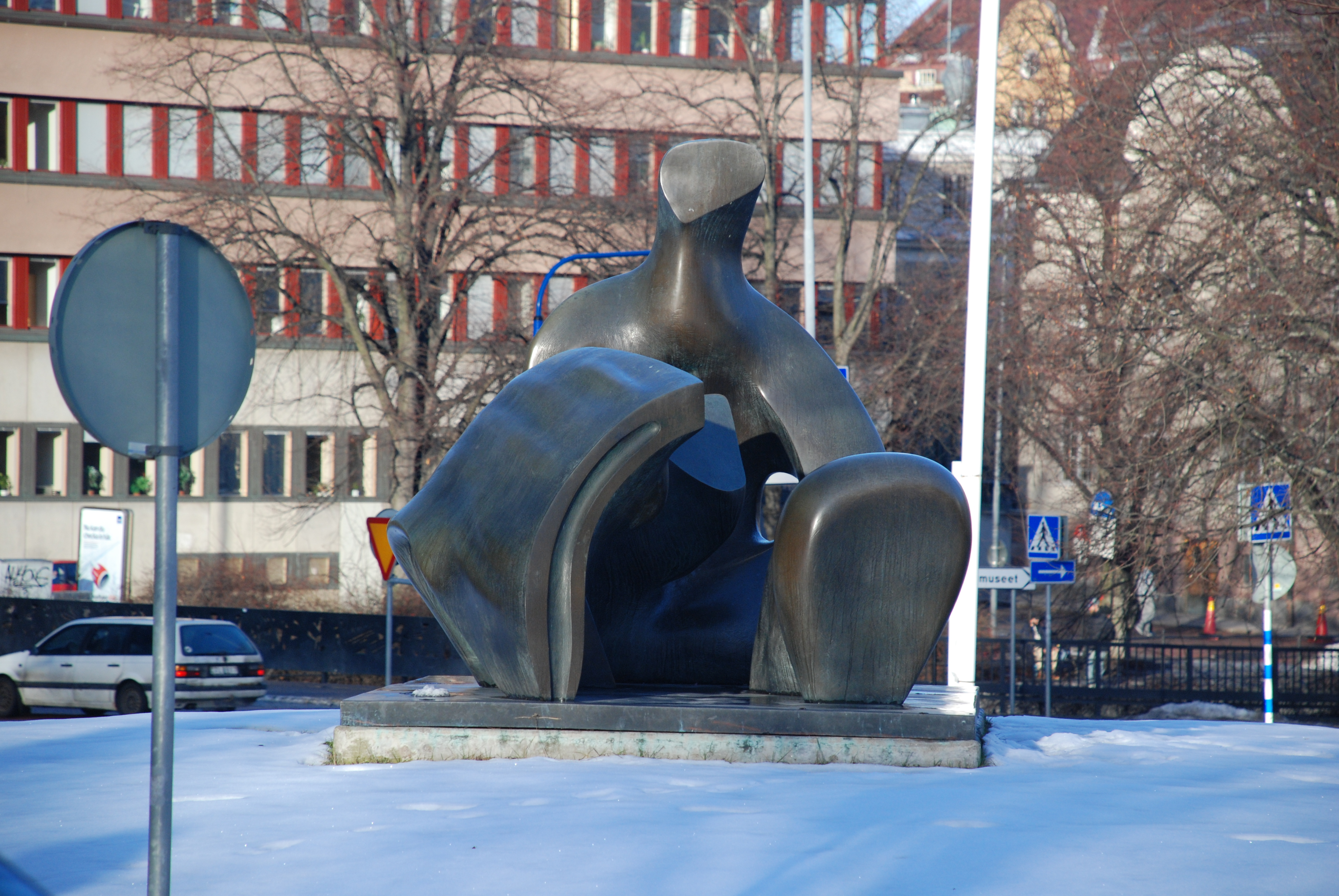
- The sculpture in Gävle/Sweden, February 2008
- Artist: Henry Moore
- Year: 1975
- Catalogue: LH 655
- Medium: bronze
- Dimensions: 447 cm (176 in)

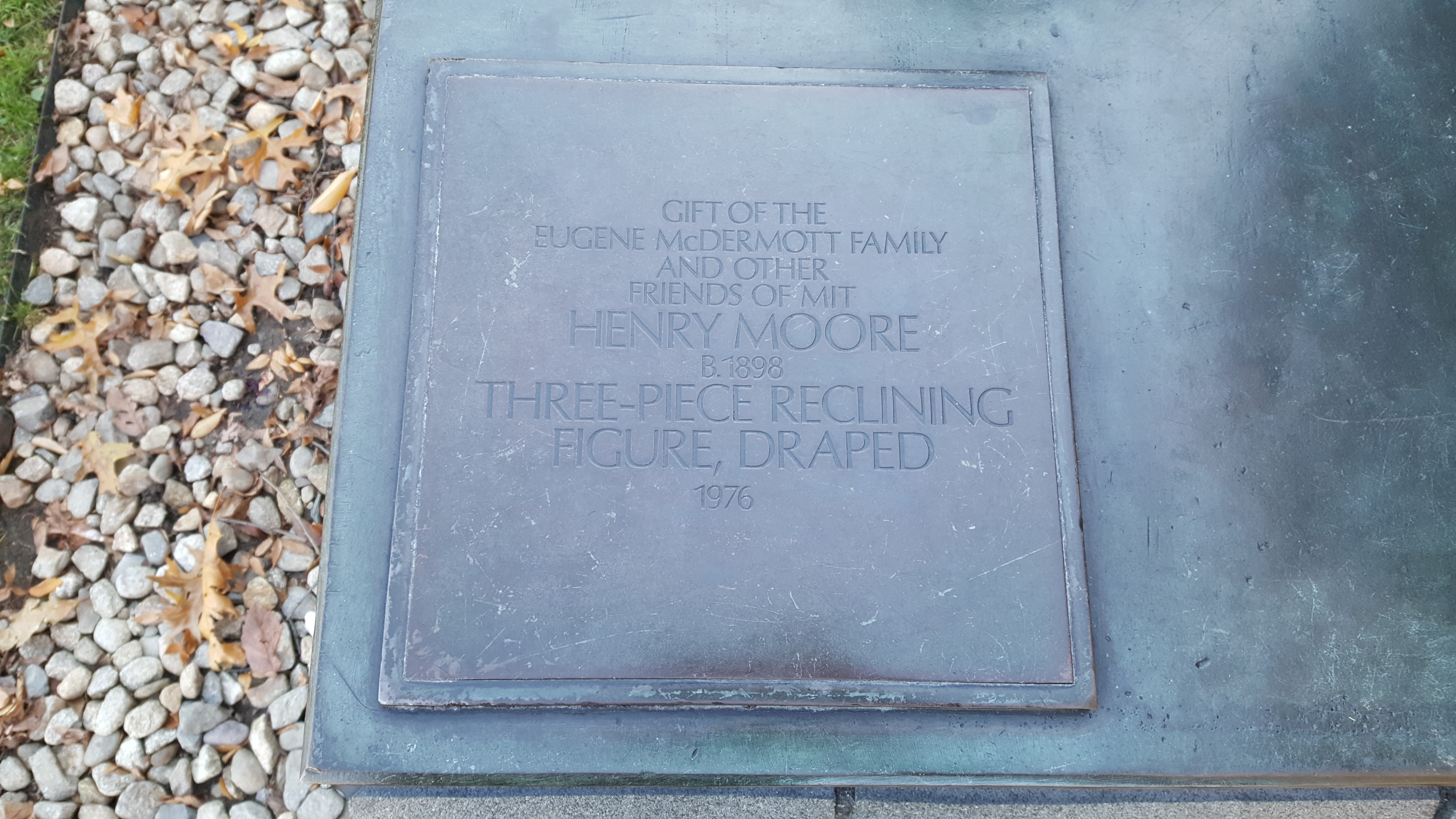
Plaque for the sculpture installed on the Massachusetts Institute of Technology campus in Boston, Massachusetts, in 2019.

Three Piece Reclining Figure: Draped 1975 is a bronze sculpture by Henry Moore, catalogued as LH 655. It is approximately 4.7m long. Seven casts and an artist's proof were made. Three publicly exhibited casts are situated in the Sodra Kungsgatan in Gävle, Sweden, at the Massachusetts Institute of Technology in Boston, USA, and the Henry Moore Foundation in Perry Green, Hertfordshire.

One of nine casts of Moore's Working Model for Three-Piece Reclining Figure: Draped 1975 (LH654) sold at auction at Sotheby's in New York in May 2015 for $2.89 million. One of the seven casts from the collection of Philip and Muriel Berman sold for $7.5 million in November 2004 at Sotheby's in New York City.

== Columbus, Ohio ==
LH 655 cast 6 is installed outside the Columbus Museum of Art in Columbus, Ohio, United States. The abstract reclining figure measures 104 inches (2.6 m) x 104 inches (2.6 m) x 186 inches (4.7 m).

== See also ==
- List of sculptures by Henry Moore
- 1975 in art
- List of public art in Columbus, Ohio
