= Greenwood Park Sofa =

Sculpture in Columbus, Ohio, U.S.

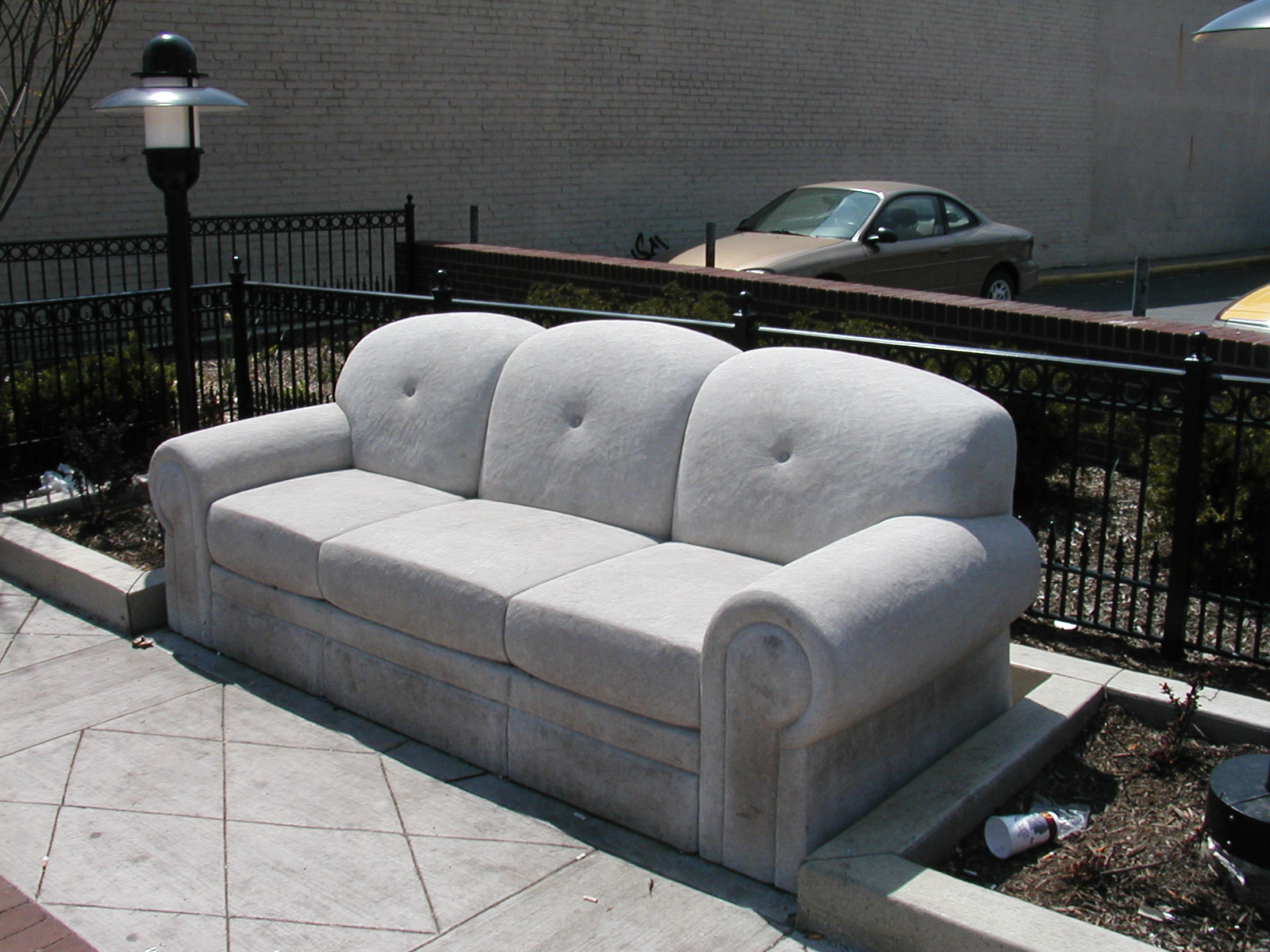
- The sculpture in 2005
- Artist: Robert Huff
- Year: 2004
- Medium: Limestone sculpture
- Subject: Couch
- Location: Columbus, Ohio, U.S.
- 39.955483°N 83.003034°W

Greenwood Park Sofa, also known as Limestone Sofa, is a 2004 limestone sculpture of a couch by Robert Huff, installed in Columbus, Ohio. Formerly installed in its namesake pocket park on High Street for a decade, the artwork "became the locus for reports of public urination, intimidation and petty theft on the sidewalk and in the parking lot behind it", according to Tracy Zollinger Turner of the Short North Gazette. The work was later restored by the artist and installed outside the Cultural Arts Center in Downtown Columbus.

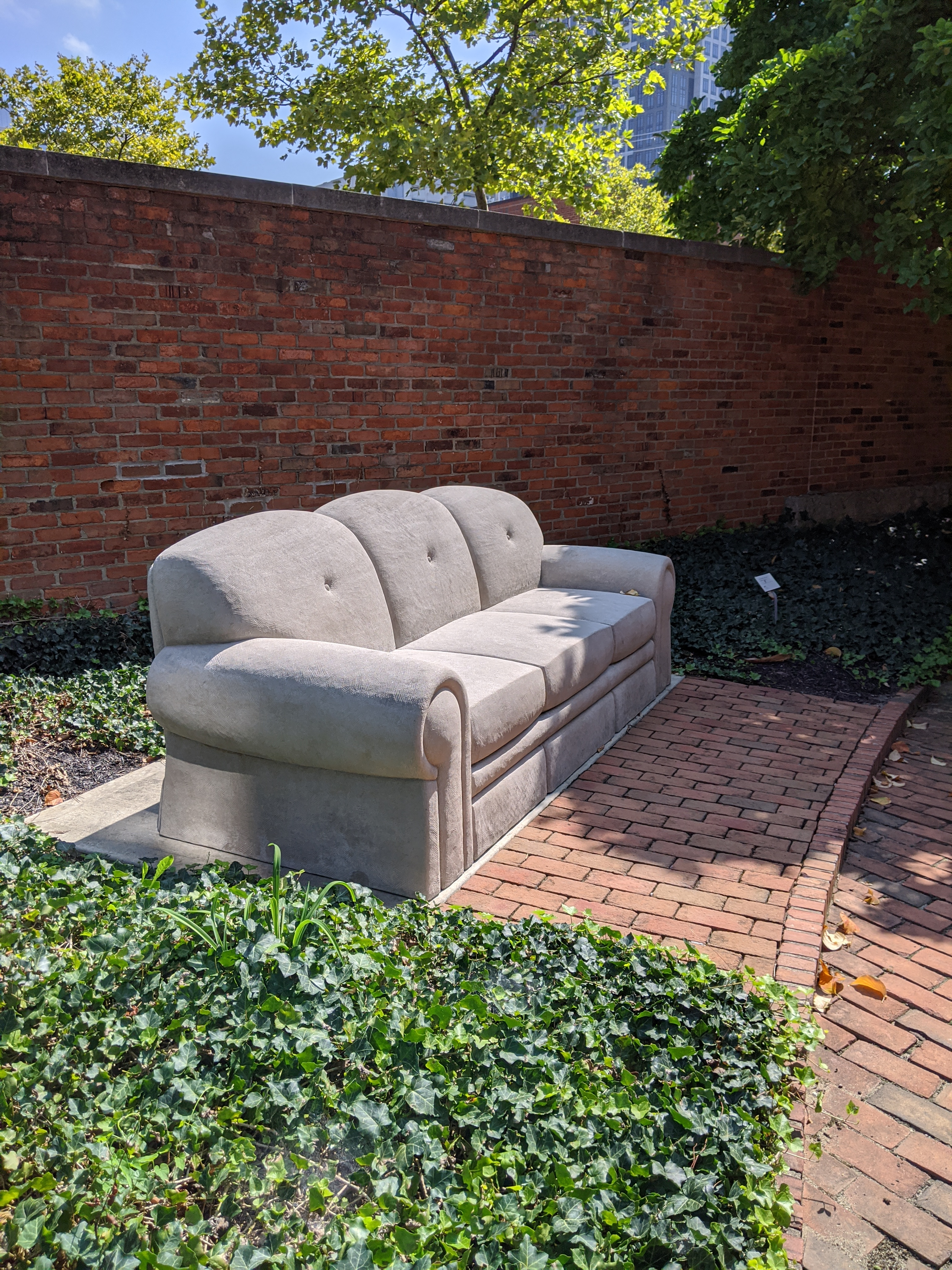
The sofa in its current location

== See also ==
- Street furniture
