= Waterford Tower =

High-rise building in Columbus, Ohio, United States

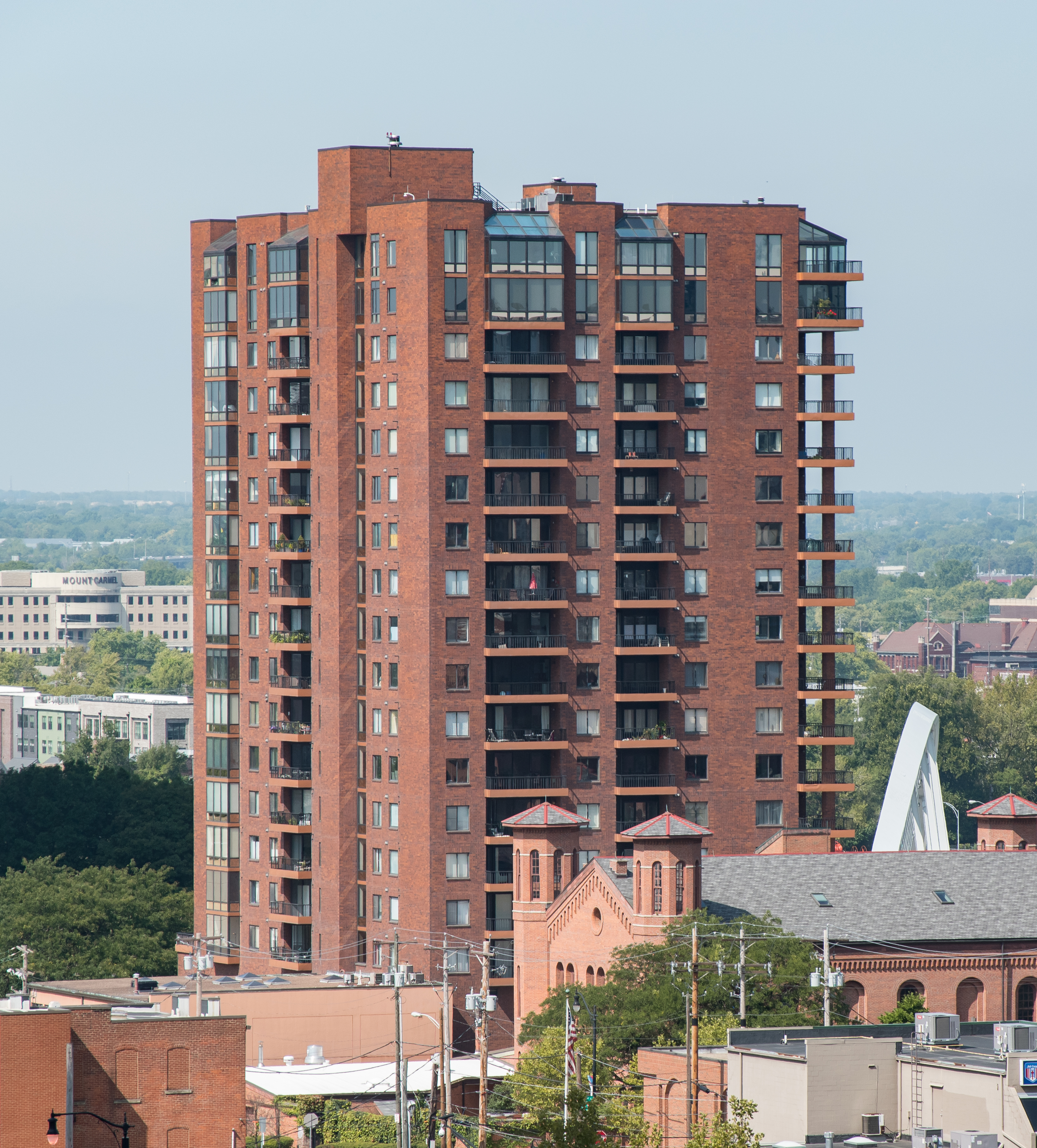
- Interactive map of the Waterford Tower area

General information
- Location: 155 W. Main Street, Columbus, Ohio
- Coordinates: 39.955294°N 83.003872°W
- Groundbreaking: July 1986
- Completed: 1988
- Cost: $17 million

Technical details
- Floor count: 19

Other information
- Number of units: 97

Waterford Tower is a 19-story high-rise building in Downtown Columbus, Ohio. The building was constructed in 1988, near the historical site of the junction of the Columbus Feeder Canal and Scioto River. The city's mayor at the time, Buck Rinehart, considered the project the "boldest" housing development ever built in Downtown Columbus, and that it would help the rebirth of the city's center. The work was one of the first projects in the downtown housing market after years without development, and the first high-rise, high-density residential building built downtown in 15 years.

The building is considered a luxury condominium building, although units range significantly in price. In 2006, the most expensive cost around $1 million, while the least expensive were $90,000. Unlike the many offices and warehouse buildings converted for residential use, Waterford Tower was built for residential use, allowing for more amenities. Amenities include a guest suite, indoor pool and racquetball court, a sun deck, fitness center, sauna, full-time concierge, and enclosed parking. The amenities set a higher standard for living in Downtown Columbus. The tower abuts Bicentennial Park, situated just south of its fountains. The residents helped spur a change in its fountains' schedules, amid complaints of noise from play and from concerts at the park's amphitheater.

Construction began in July 1986. Waterford Tower was completed in 1988 at a cost of $17 million, with 97 units. By the time of its opening, its owner was investigating building a Waterford Tower II. The building's opening gala was a significant event for the wealthy, continuing to further events, galas, and the annual Red, White and Boom parties on the Fourth of July. Despite newer luxury high-rises constructed in Downtown Columbus, Waterford Tower has maintained its prominence, still containing a crystal chandelier from the SS Normandie in the lobby, and a full-time concierge at the front desk.

A ten-foot-tall steel and brass sculpture, Shamash-Light Tower I, was installed outside the building in October 1988. The work was created by Columbus artist Stephen Canneto.

== See also ==
- List of tallest buildings in Columbus, Ohio
