= Dr. Samuel Mitchel Smith and Sons Memorial Fountain =

Statue and memorial in Columbus, Ohio, U.S.

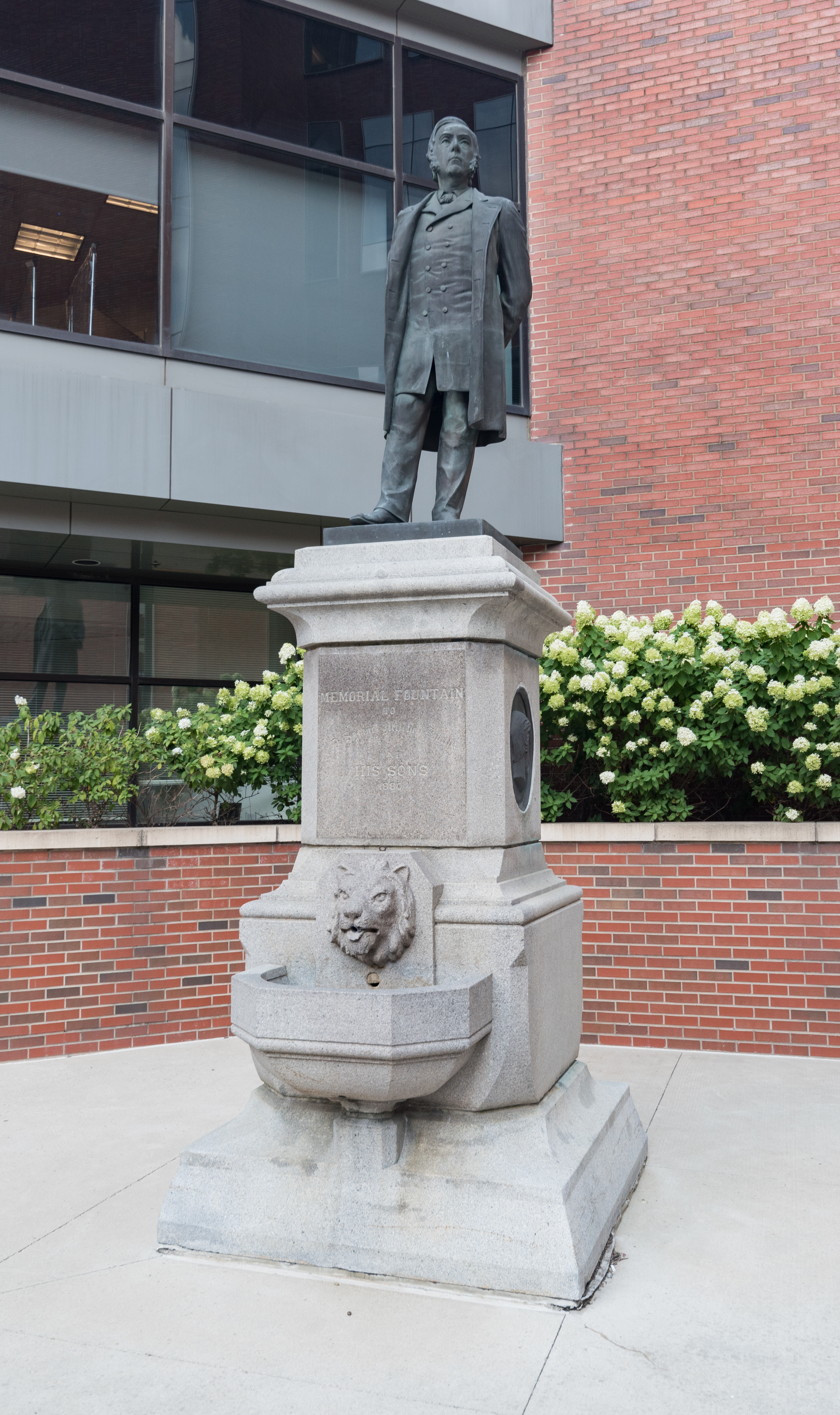
- Artist: William Walcutt
- Year: 1880
- Medium: Bronze sculpture; Granite base
- Subject: Samuel Mitchel Smith
- Dimensions: 6.5 x 2 x 2.5 ft. (statue); 8 x 5 x 5 ft. (base)
- Location: Columbus, Ohio, U.S.; 39.9954°N 83.02006°W

The Dr. Samuel Mitchel Smith and Sons Memorial Fountain is an 1880 sculpture and memorial by William Walcutt, installed at the Ohio State University Wexner Medical Center in Columbus, Ohio. The bronze and granite memorial is dedicated to Samuel Mitchel Smith, Surgeon General of Ohio during the American Civil War, and the first academic professor for the treatment of the mentally ill in the United States.

The statue stood at Columbus's downtown center at Broad and High streets from 1880 to 1915. Its poor placement on the street prompted its move to St. Francis Hospital, site of the present-day Grant Medical Center, where it stood until the hospital's demolition in 1957. The statue was then moved to the Columbus Health Department's Franklinton office, where it stood until it was stolen and recovered in 1994. It was then relocated to its current site, the Harding Hospital at the Wexner Medical Center, on the Ohio State University campus.

== Description ==
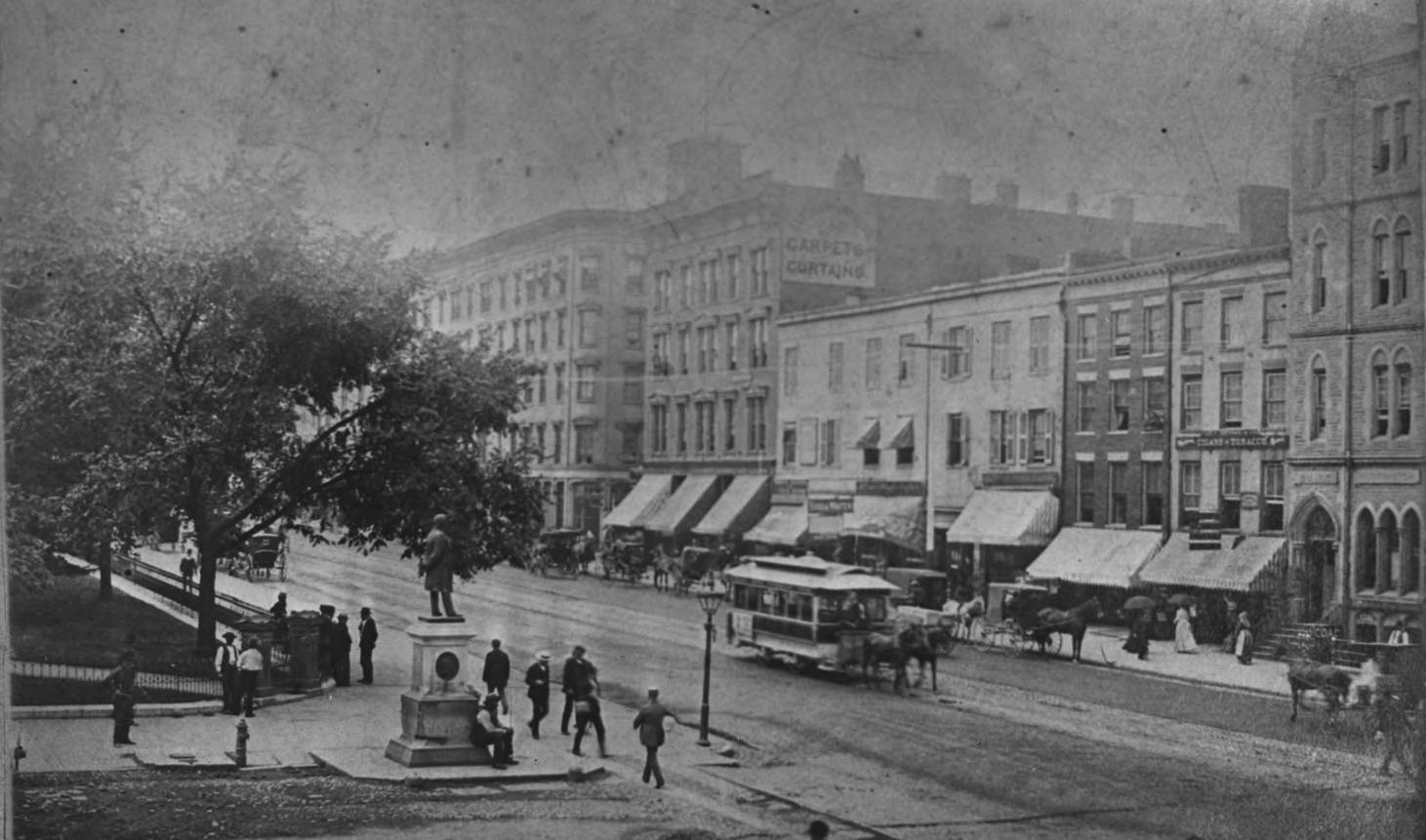
On Broad Street looking south down High Street, 1880

The bronze sculpture of Dr. Samuel Mitchel Smith (1816–1874) was sculpted in 1880 by Columbus artist William Walcutt. Smith was the Surgeon General of Ohio during the American Civil War (1862–64) and the 25th president of the Ohio State Medical Society (1869–70). He was also the first professor of psychiatry (or its equivalent) in the U.S., at Willoughby Medical College (later known as Starling Medical College; the present-day Ohio State University College of Medicine). Smith later served as a dean of the school, from 1849 to 1858, and again from 1860 to 1863.

The statue measures approximately 6.5 x 2 x 2.5 ft and weighs 900 pounds. It rests on a granite base measuring approximately 8 x 5 x 5 ft and weighing 14 tons. His full-size figure is shown wearing a Prince Albert coat and with his hands folded behind his back. Two sides of the base display bronze oval cameos with profiles of the doctor's two deceased sons, Charles and Samuel. The left side depicts his son Charles who died the same year, 1874, at the age of 21, while the right depicts his son Samuel, who died in 1878 at the age of 30. The front of the base has a fountain, formerly operational. The fountain consists of an ornamental animal head spout and semi-octagonal basin. The fountain base was chosen as the family was impressed with drinking fountain statues they saw in Europe. Smith reportedly preferred the idea of a social, usable drinking fountain over a headstone in a cemetery. The statue's inscription reads "Memorial Fountain, to Dr. Samuel Mitchel Smith and His Sons, 1880."

In 1994, the statue was valued by the city at $25,000, though its replacement cost would exceed that due to its almost seven-foot height and composition of solid bronze.

== History ==
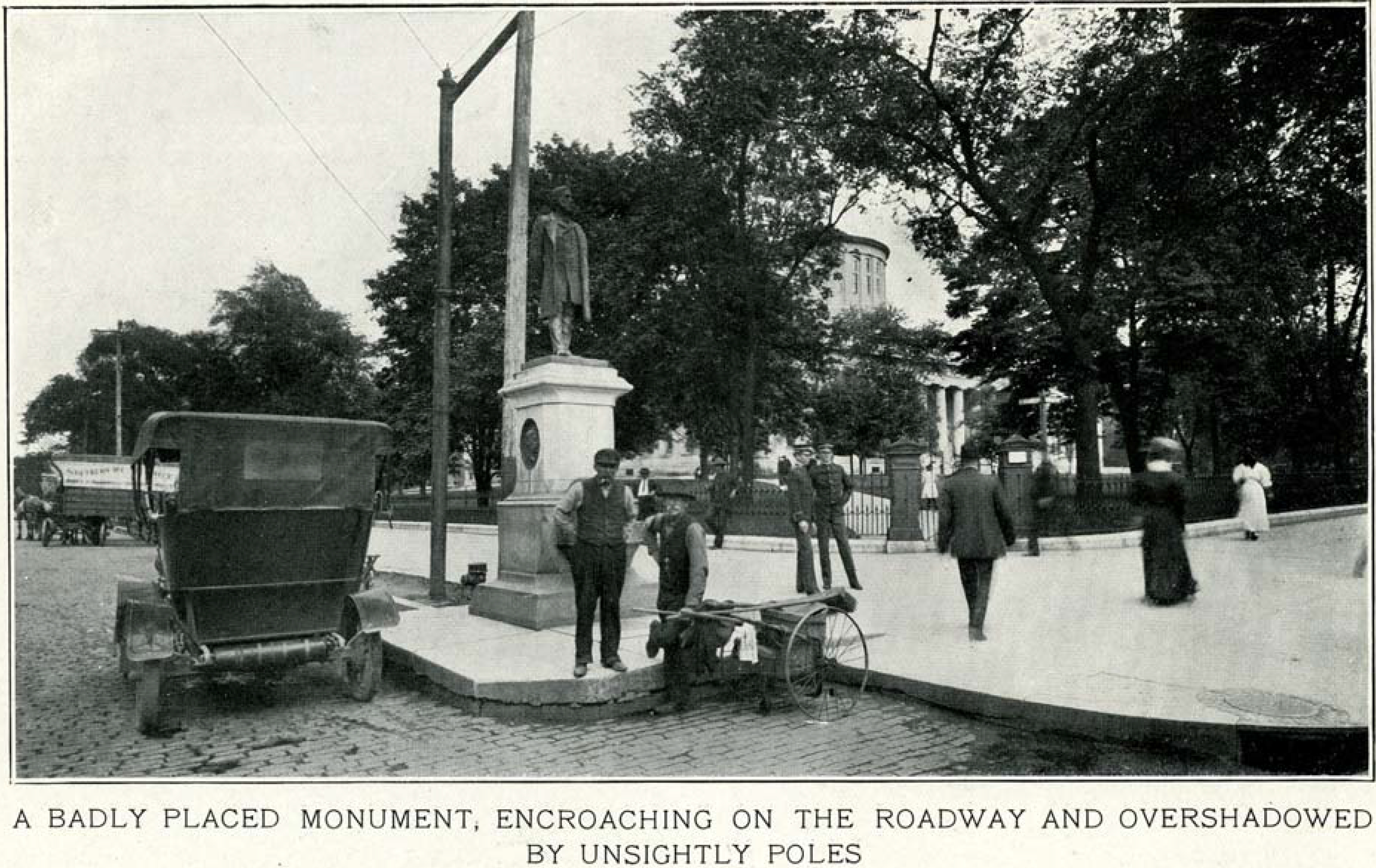
Featured in the 1908 Columbus Plan for its original poor placement

The Dr. Samuel Mitchel Smith and Sons Memorial Fountain was developed as a memorial to the doctor by his widow and daughters, five years after his 1874 death. It was forged at the Kelby Foundry in New York state.

The memorial was originally installed at the southeast corner of Broad and High streets around 1880. It was authorized in 1879, and officially unveiled on Memorial Day in 1881, and was then given as a gift to the city. The statue was a feature of the 1908 Columbus Plan; the statue's placement interfered with traffic, as it was installed on sidewalk sticking out onto Broad Street. This problem, as well as the fountain not functioning and defacement by vandalism, spurred its first move.

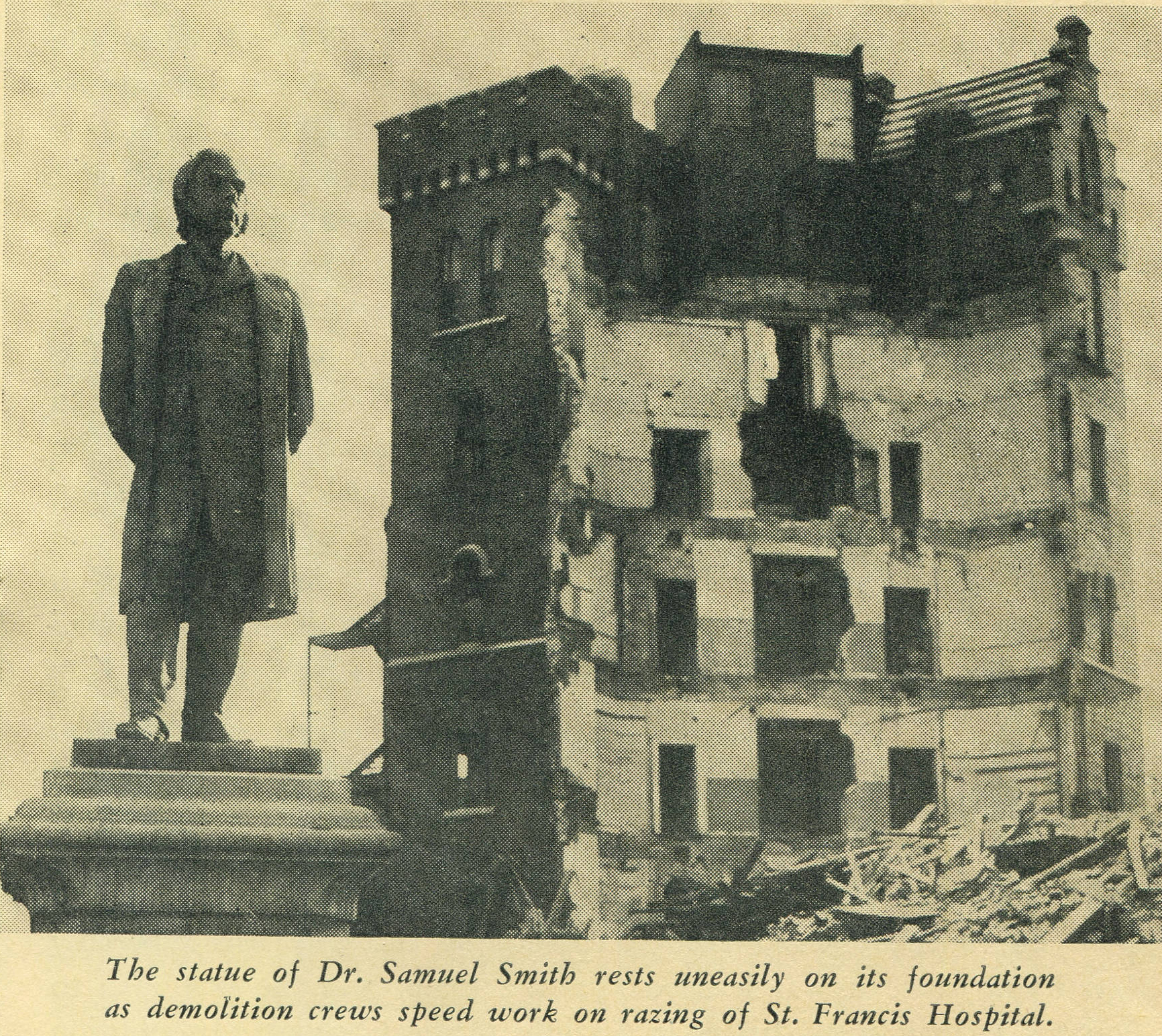
The statue in front of St. Francis Hospital as it is torn down, 1957

In 1915, after 35 years, it was relocated to the Starling Medical College (also known as St. Francis Hospital) at the intersection of State and Sixth Streets. The move led the statue's admirers to believe it escaped being adorned with a hat, an occurrence that happened each autumn by an unknown visitor, though the acts continued. The statue stood there for 42 years. Around 1957, the hospital was torn town and replaced by the larger Grant Medical Center. The statue was viewed as being in imminent danger. Columbus City Council's president suggested it be moved to the City Health and Safety Center (the Columbus Health Department offices), where it was temporarily stored in its basement. Several months later, it was placed on its front lawn, at the southeast corner of the Scioto Peninsula, where the statue faced downtown Columbus for 37 years. In 1987, local psychiatrists honored Smith for his pioneering ideas by visiting his statue. The statue was surveyed by the Smithsonian Institution's "Save Outdoor Sculpture!" program in 1993.

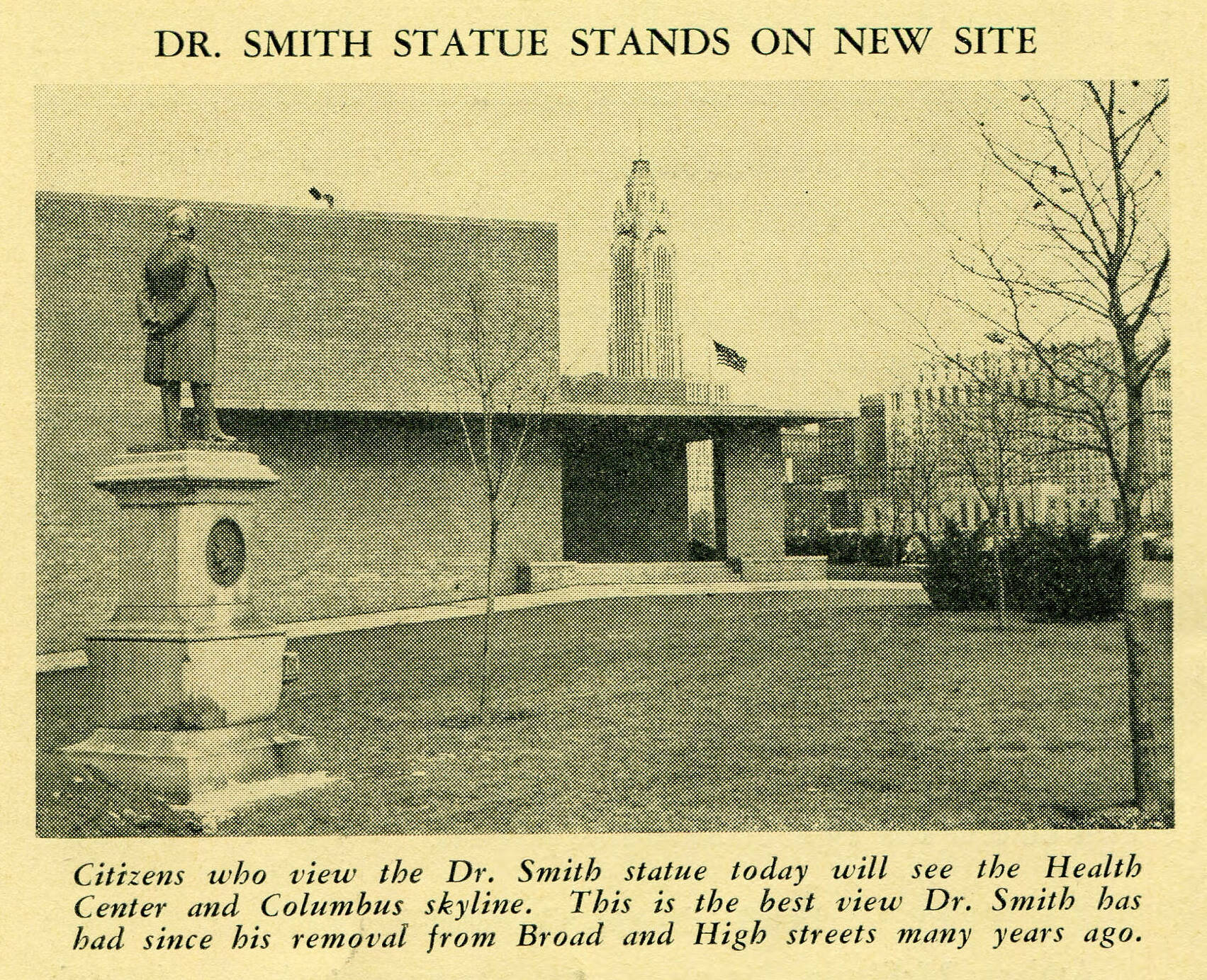
The statue by the Columbus Health Department, 1957

Ohio State University's psychiatry department chair began looking into having the statue relocated to the campus in the mid-1980s. Before this could happen, however, the statue was stolen from its Health Center site. The October 1994 theft led to the statue's sale to an antique dealer in Atlanta, and resale to a dealer in Durham, North Carolina, for $6,800. The statue was then confiscated by Durham police. A Columbus-area former antiques dealer was arrested over the theft. Columbus police claimed he and others were looking to steal a statue of President James A. Garfield. The man was fined and given a 90-day prison sentence. Damage to the statue's shoes indicated its theft to a Columbus-area antiques show promoter who viewed it in Atlanta, who also received a tip that the statue might be the one stolen in Columbus.

The statue was returned to Columbus for restoration in December 1994. Following the restoration, the statue was placed at the Harding Hospital, Ohio State's then-new psychiatry building on the Wexner Medical Center campus. The building opened in March 1994 with the statue in mind; a foundation was created at that time for the statue outside its Upham Drive entrance.

== See also ==
- 1880 in art
- List of public art in Columbus, Ohio
