= Ohio Veterans Plaza =

Memorial plaza in Columbus, Ohio, U.S.

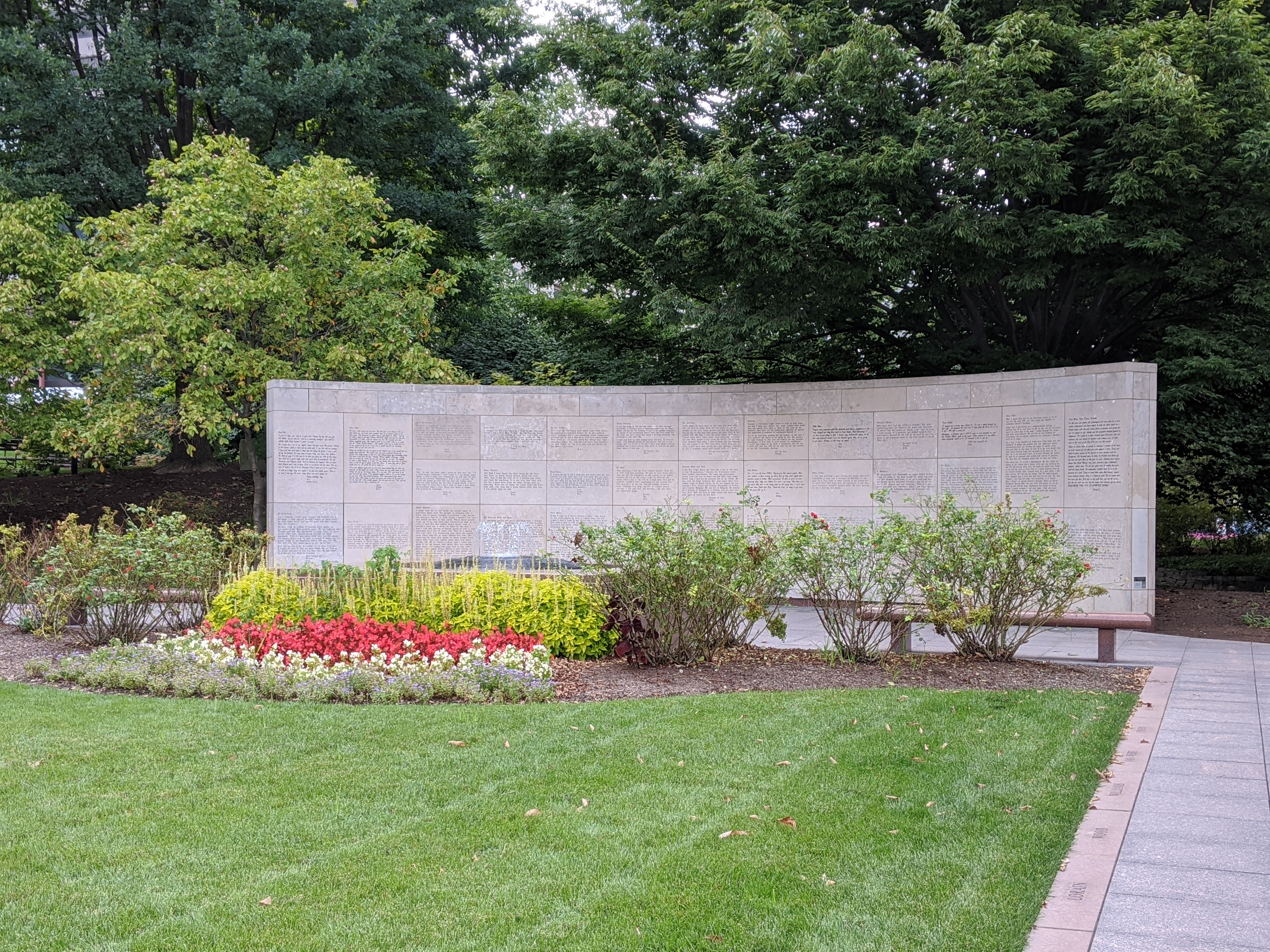
- One of the memorial's limestone walls, 2020
- 39°57′41.2″N 82°59′53.2″W
- Location: Ohio Statehouse
- Designer: John Schooley
- Dedicated to: Ohio soldiers since World War II, including future troops

Ohio Veterans Plaza is a memorial on the east side of the Ohio Statehouse grounds, in Columbus, Ohio, United States, commemorating "Ohio men and women who have served our country since World War II, as well as those who will serve in the future". Designed by John Schooley, the plaza features a lawn flanked by two Ohio limestone walls with inscriptions written by Ohio military personnel.

== See also ==
- List of public art in Columbus, Ohio
