= Columbus Police Memorial =

Memorial in Columbus, Ohio, U.S.

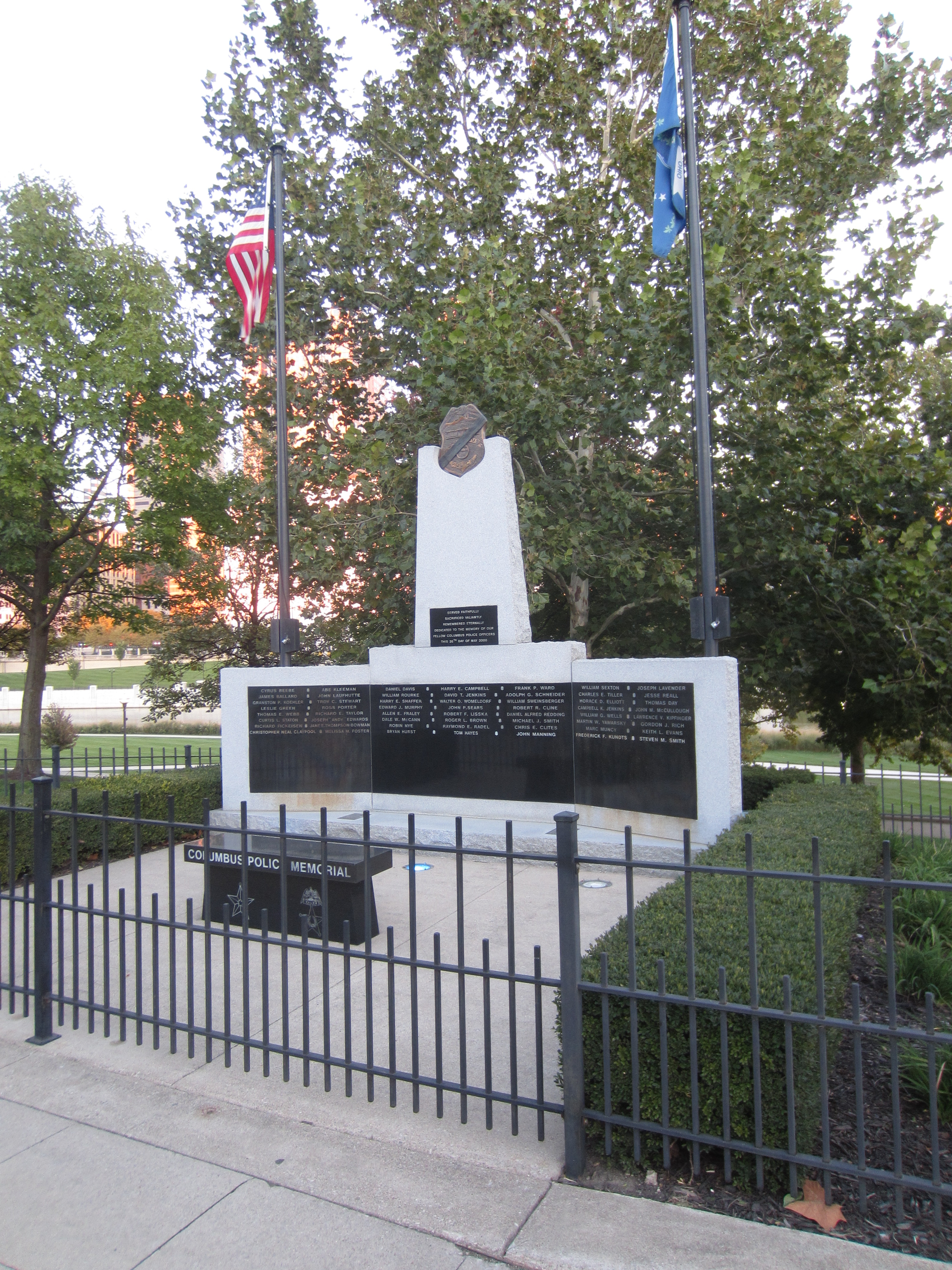
- The memorial in 2018
- 39°57′32.7″N 83°0′19.9″W
- Location: Genoa Park, Columbus, Ohio, United States

The Columbus Police Memorial is a memorial in Columbus, Ohio's Genoa Park, United States. It has inscriptions of the names of police officers killed while serving, and serves as a gathering site for memorial services. Its dedication ceremony was held on 26 May 2000.

The original drawings for the design was made by Thomas Raymond Hayes, a civilian police artist who became paralyzed during his service as a police officer in 1979 when he sustained a gunshot wound in the back while arresting two drugged teenagers. His name was also etched into the memorial after his death at the age of 61 on 20 January 2011, which was ruled a homicide by the Franklin County Coroner in March 2011.

== Description ==
The monument is approximately 15 feet (4.6 m) wide and 10 feet (3.0 m) tall, made out of Barre Gray granite with polished black standard inserts. Atop the center of its base stands a tapering pillar crowned by a bronze Columbus Division of Police badge with a black mourning band. A plaque beneath the badge reads as follows:

SERVED FAITHFULLY
SACRIFICED VALIANTLY
REMEMBERED ETERNALLY
DEDICATED TO THE MEMORY OF OUR
FELLOW COLUMBUS POLICE OFFICERS
THIS 26^{th} DAY OF MAY 2000

Three back-to-back rectangular slabs, bricked up in the base and inscribed with white lettering, list the names of police officers who have died in the line of duty. The name of Columbus SWAT officer Steven M. Smith is currently the last (56th) among them after being engraved on May 11, 2016; he was shot in Clintonville on April 10 of that year and succumbed to his injuries three days later.

== See also ==
- 2000 in art
- Ohio Police and Fire Memorial Park
