= Untitled (Falsetti) =

Sculpture in Columbus, Ohio, U.S.

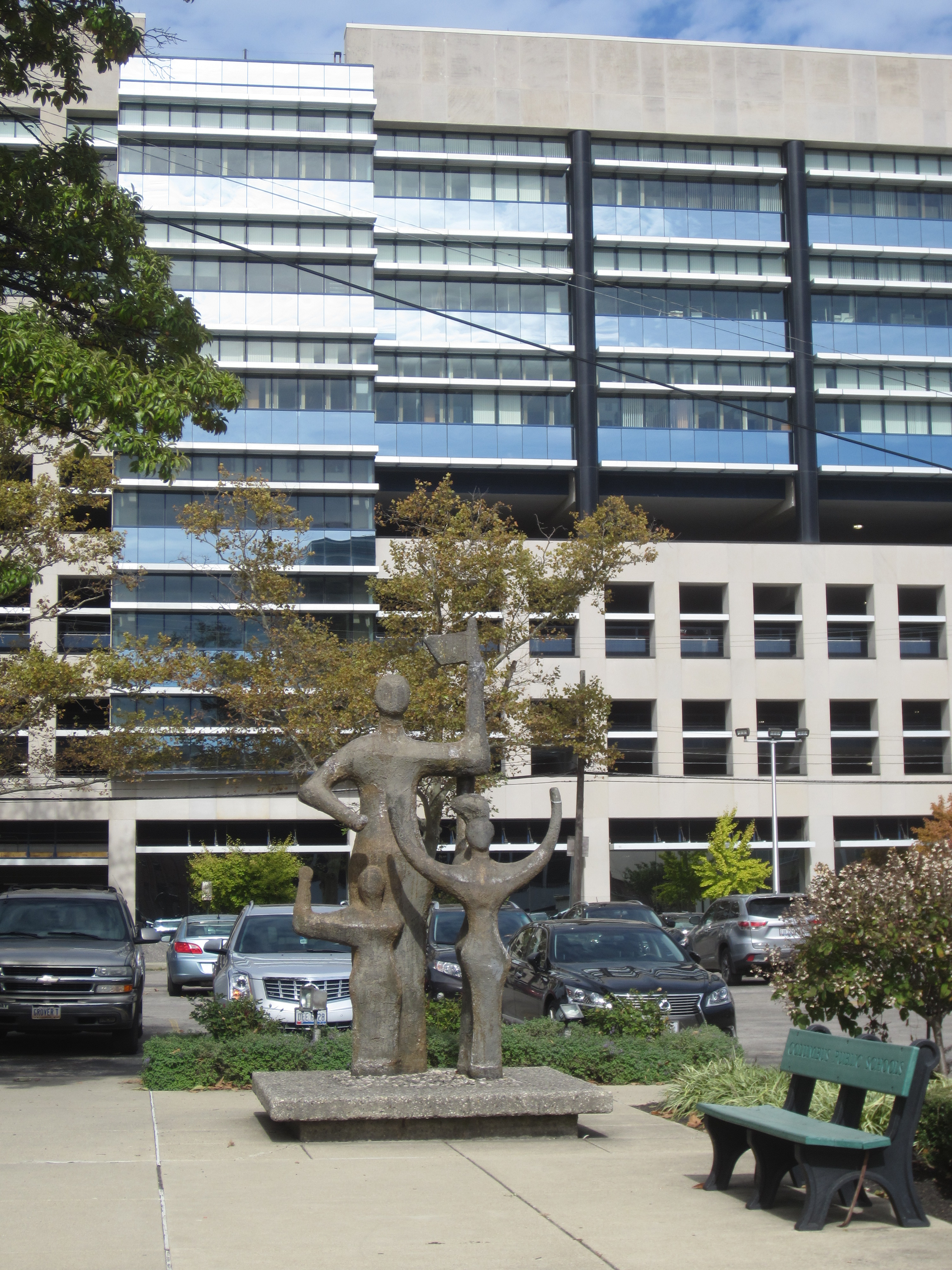
- The sculpture in 2018
- Artist: Joe Falsetti
- Year: 1960
- Location: Columbus, Ohio, United States
- 39°57′40.4″N 82°59′35.9″W

Untitled, also known as Figure Group, is a 1960 sculpture by artist Joe Falsetti and architect David Schackne Jr. It is installed outside the east entrance of the Columbus Public Schools' Administration Office (270 East State Street) in Columbus, Ohio, United States.

== Description and history ==
The artwork features four abstract fiberglass figures, each measuring approximately 13 ft. x 2 ft. 8 in. x 3 ft., on a steel armature. The teacher and three students are installed on an aggregate concrete base measuring approximately 1 ft. 1 in. x 7 ft. 1 in. x 7 ft. 1 in. The sculpture was surveyed by the Smithsonian Institution's "Save Outdoor Sculpture!" program in 1992.

== See also ==
- 1960 in art
