= Statue of Lucas Sullivant =

Statue in Columbus, Ohio, U.S.

- The statue in 2018
- Year: 2000
- Subject: Lucas Sullivant
- Location: Columbus, Ohio, United States; 39°57′38.5″N 83°0′21.1″W

A statue of Lucas Sullivant by Michael Foley is installed in Columbus, Ohio's Genoa Park, in the United States. The sculpture was commissioned by the Franklinton Historical Society in 2000, and unveiled on May 6. The plinth depicts scenes from Franklinton's origins.

== See also ==
- 2000 in art
