= Statue of Benjamin Franklin (Columbus, Ohio) =

Statue in Columbus, Ohio, U.S.

Benjamin Franklin
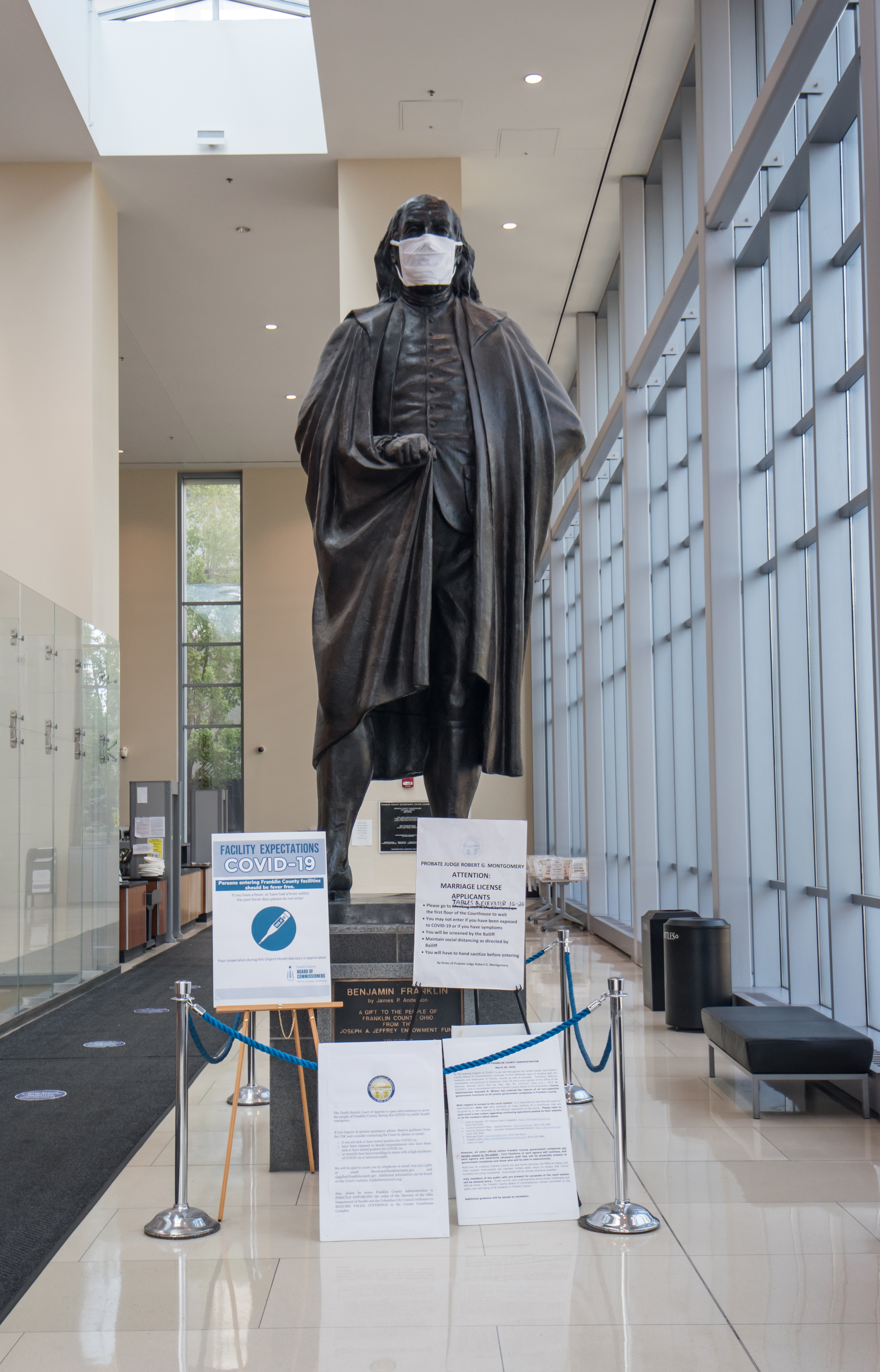
- The statue in 2020, amid the COVID-19 pandemic
- Artist: James P. Anderson
- Year: 1974
- Medium: Bronze sculpture
- Subject: Benjamin Franklin
- Dimensions: 3.7 m (12 ft)
- Location: Columbus, Ohio, United States; 39.954425°N 82.999865°W

Benjamin Franklin, a 1974 bronze statue of Benjamin Franklin, stands inside the Franklin County Government Center in Columbus, Ohio. The statue was created by James P. Anderson and cast in Pietrasanta, Italy.

== Description ==
The 12-foot (3.7 m) work was created by sculptor James P. Anderson. The statue shows Franklin cloaked, though parting the cloak to reveal typical colonial statesman wear.

The statue was designed to be on an 8-ft. granite pedestal outside the government center, on its mall just north of the Franklin County Hall of Justice at the southwest corner of Mound and High streets. It is currently housed a short distance away, in a glassy entrance pavilion to the Hall of Justice.

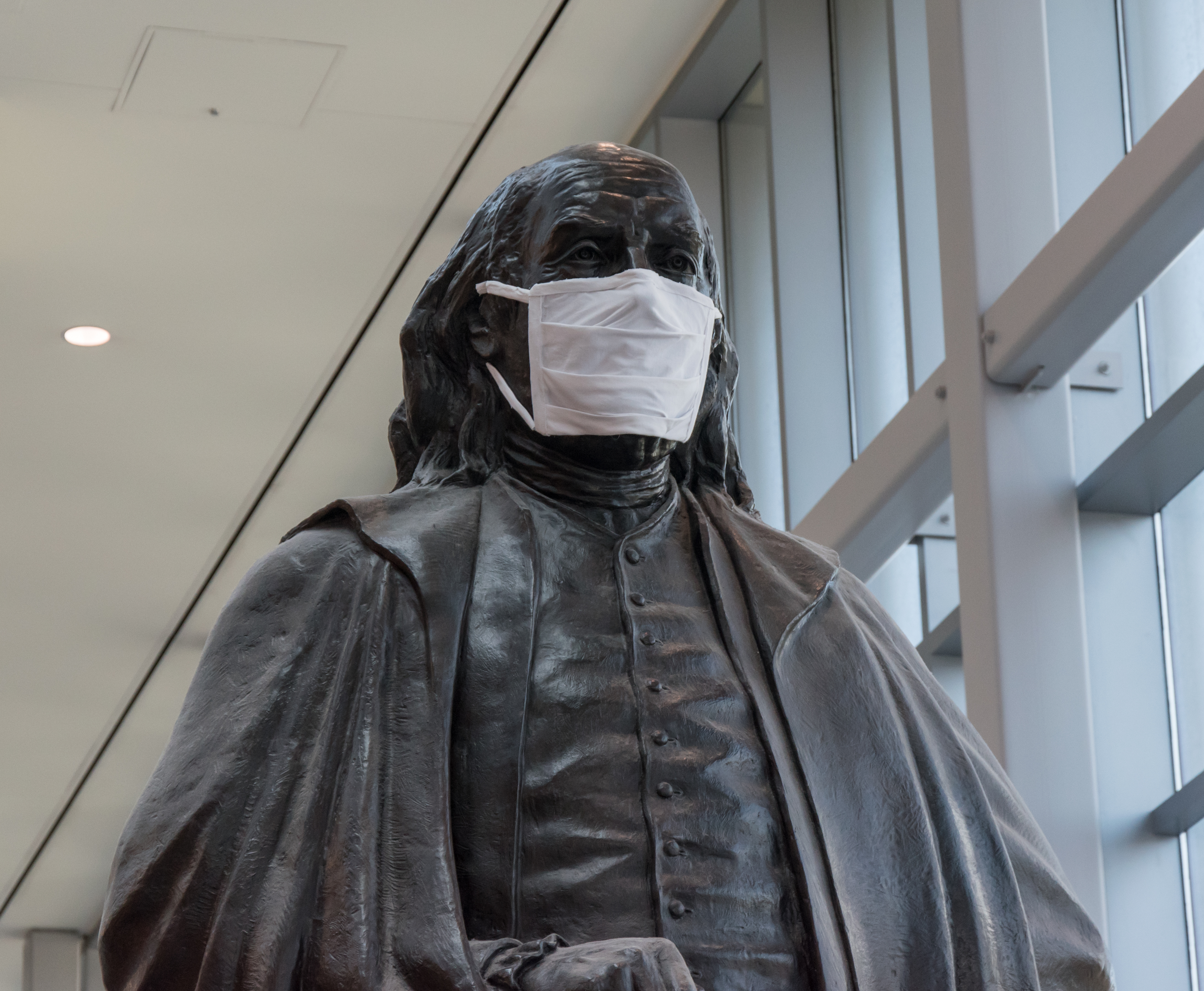
Closeup

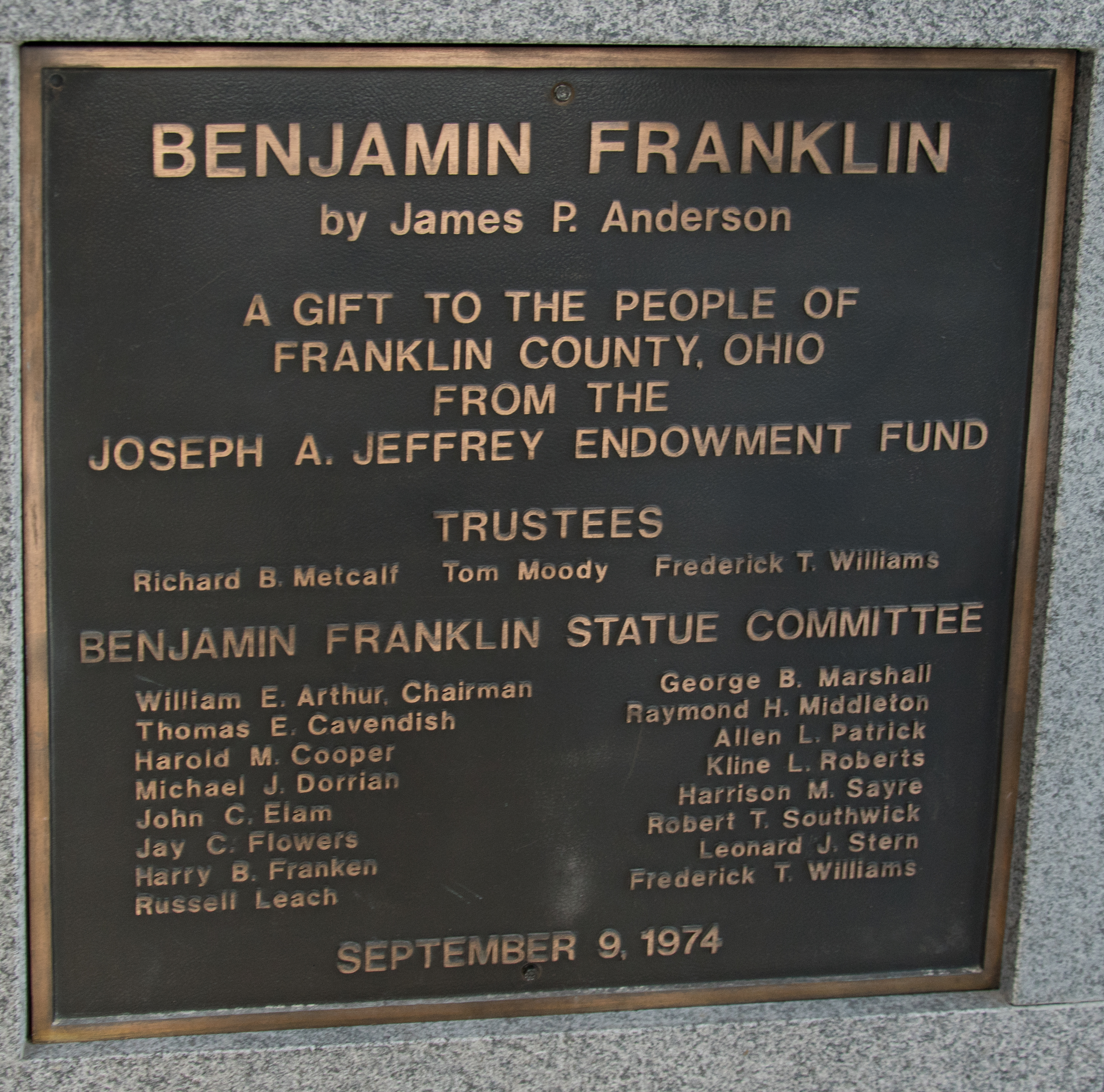
Plaque

== History ==
The statue was created in 1974. Its cost was estimated at $50,000 in December 1972 (with funds raised mostly by the Columbus Bar Association and the Columbus Foundation). Anderson was the chair of Muskingum College's art department; he had visited Boston and Philadelphia to research existing statues of Franklin. Anderson finished the statue while on sabbatical in Italy. It was cast at the Luigi Tommasi Foundry in Pietrasanta. Anderson took his sketches and models to Pietrasanta, a mecca for sculptors. On his way, Anderson viewed several of the best-known depictions of Franklin: one by Jean-Antoine Houdon and another by Jean-Jacques Caffieri in the Bibliothèque Mazarine.

It was created using lost-wax casting. The statue was first formed from steel, with clay over it, modeled to form the figure. A negative mold was created, followed by a wax positive, and then the figure was encased in plaster and baked in a kiln. As the melted wax drained away, molten bronze was poured in. The statue was created in 18 pieces, welded together by an expert craftsman, who also did the final chasing of the metal and applied its warm brown patina. The statue was the largest created by James Anderson at the time. While in Italy, Anderson supervised the casting of three bronze copies of the statue, in addition to 50 head studies. The No. 1/3 bronze copies of the statue was donated to the Eastern New Mexico University by Anderson when he was the head of the art department. In 2021, the family approached the university and requested to purchase the sculpture. The ENMU brought the sculpture to auction where the family was able to successfully bid on the bronze where it now resides. One of the bronze copies was to go to Muskingum College, and another to the Columbus Foundation. Many of the head studies would be gifts to the statue committee and others who helped with the project. The statue was dedicated along with the Hall of Justice, on September 9, 1974.

In 2011, the statue was joined in the building's lobby by the 2006 work Man of Characters, a 10-foot-tall portrait of Franklin, a gift from Ron Pizzuti's family. The work, by Brian Tolle, depicts Franklin as he appears on the $100 bill, but the lines that shape him are made up of Franklin's writings.

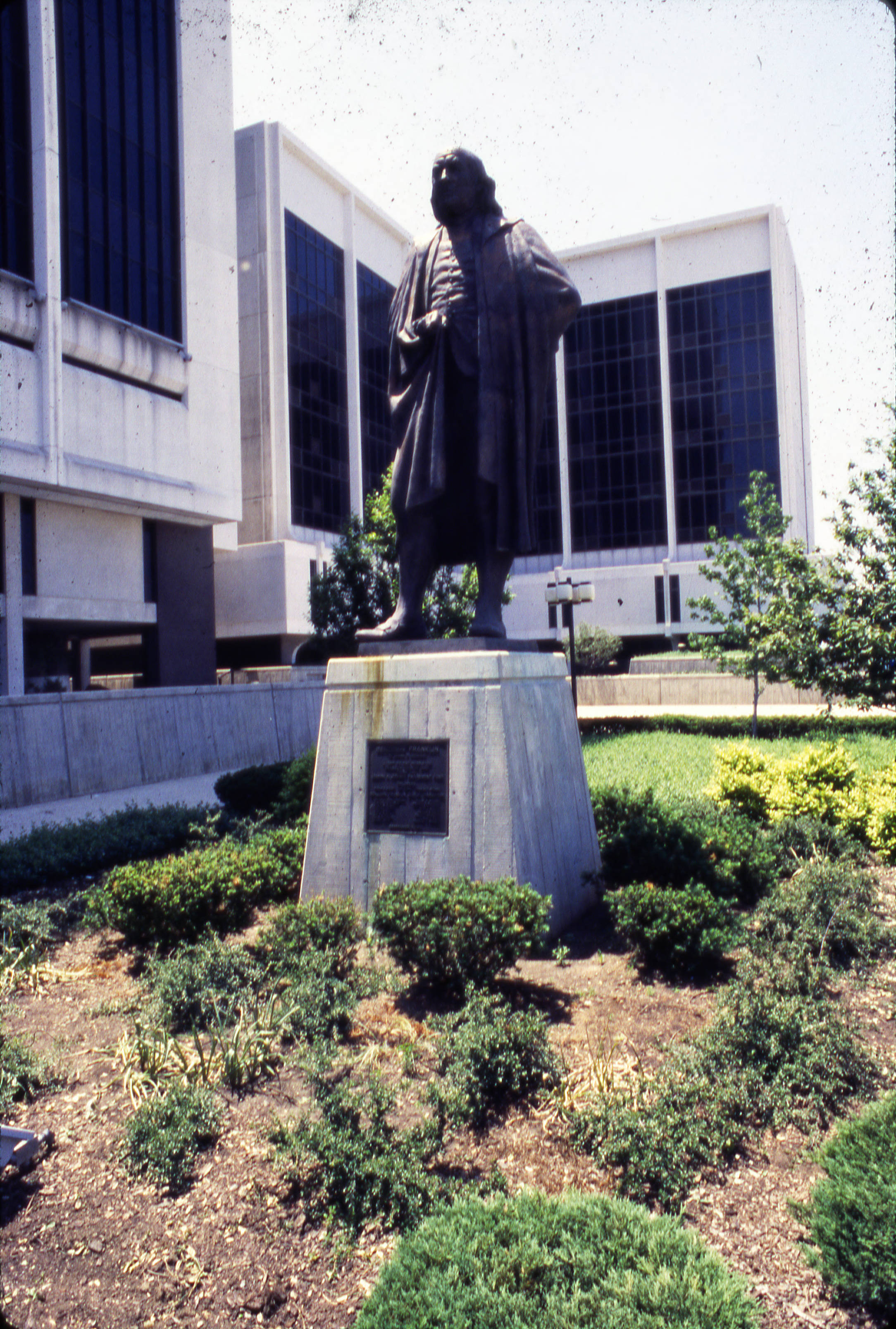
The statue while placed outside, c. 1974

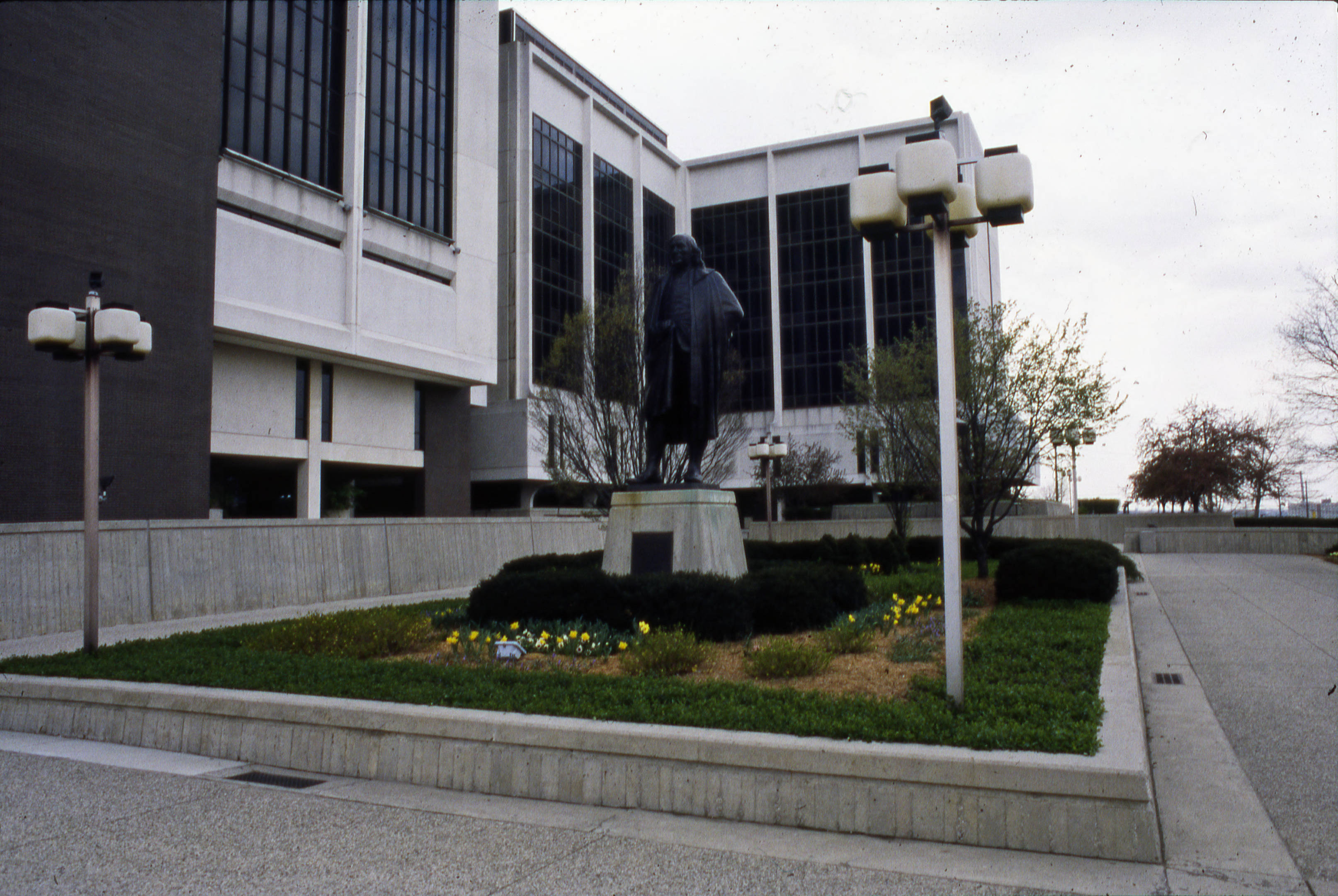
The statue amid landscaping, c. 1974

== See also ==
- 1974 in art
- Benjamin Franklin in popular culture
