= Trains (mural) =

Mural in Columbus, Ohio, U.S.

- Year: 1989
- Condition: Hidden from view
- Location: 630 N. High St., Columbus, Ohio
- 39°58′31″N 83°00′11″W

Trains is a two-story tall mural in the Short North and Italian Village neighborhoods in Columbus, Ohio. The mural was painted by Gregory and Jeff Ackers facing a parking lot in the commercial district. The work has been lost or hidden from view since about 2014, when a hotel was built on the parking lot site.

== History ==
Created by Jeff and Gregory Ackers in 1989, it covers the south wall of Bernard's Tavern and depicts passengers (some who are British royalty) on a train arriving in Columbus' Union Station. The work was painted at the behest of the organization Citizens for a Better Skyline.

It was across a parking lot of another Ackers-created mural, Union Station. Greg Ackers restored both works in 1998.

The mural was considered to be in good shape in 2012. Around 2014, the hotel Le Méridien Columbus, The Joseph was built on the space that served as a parking lot and both murals can no longer be seen. Also lost during the project was a mural, Cliff Dwellers, based on the 1913 George Bellows painting.

Artist Gregory Ackers responded to the planned development eliminating his work in 2012: "The way I see it, some things in life are permanent, and some things are temporary. Acceptance is a hard thing, but I accept it."
