= Columbus Firefighters Memorial =

Memorial in Columbus, Ohio, U.S.

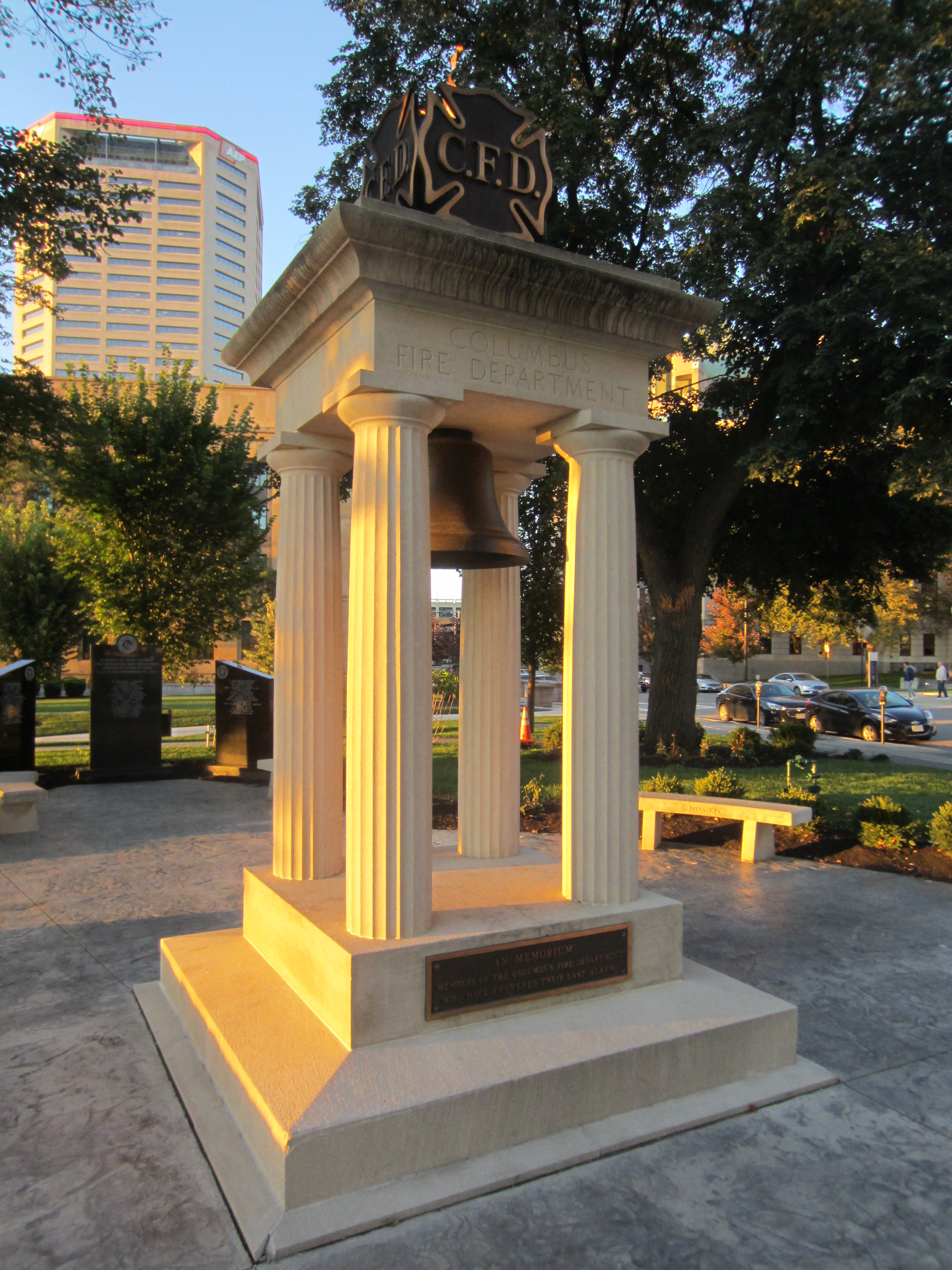
- The memorial in 2018
- Interactive map of Columbus Firefighters Memorial
- Location: Battelle Riverfront Park, Columbus, Ohio, United States
- Coordinates: 39°57′47″N 83°00′17″W

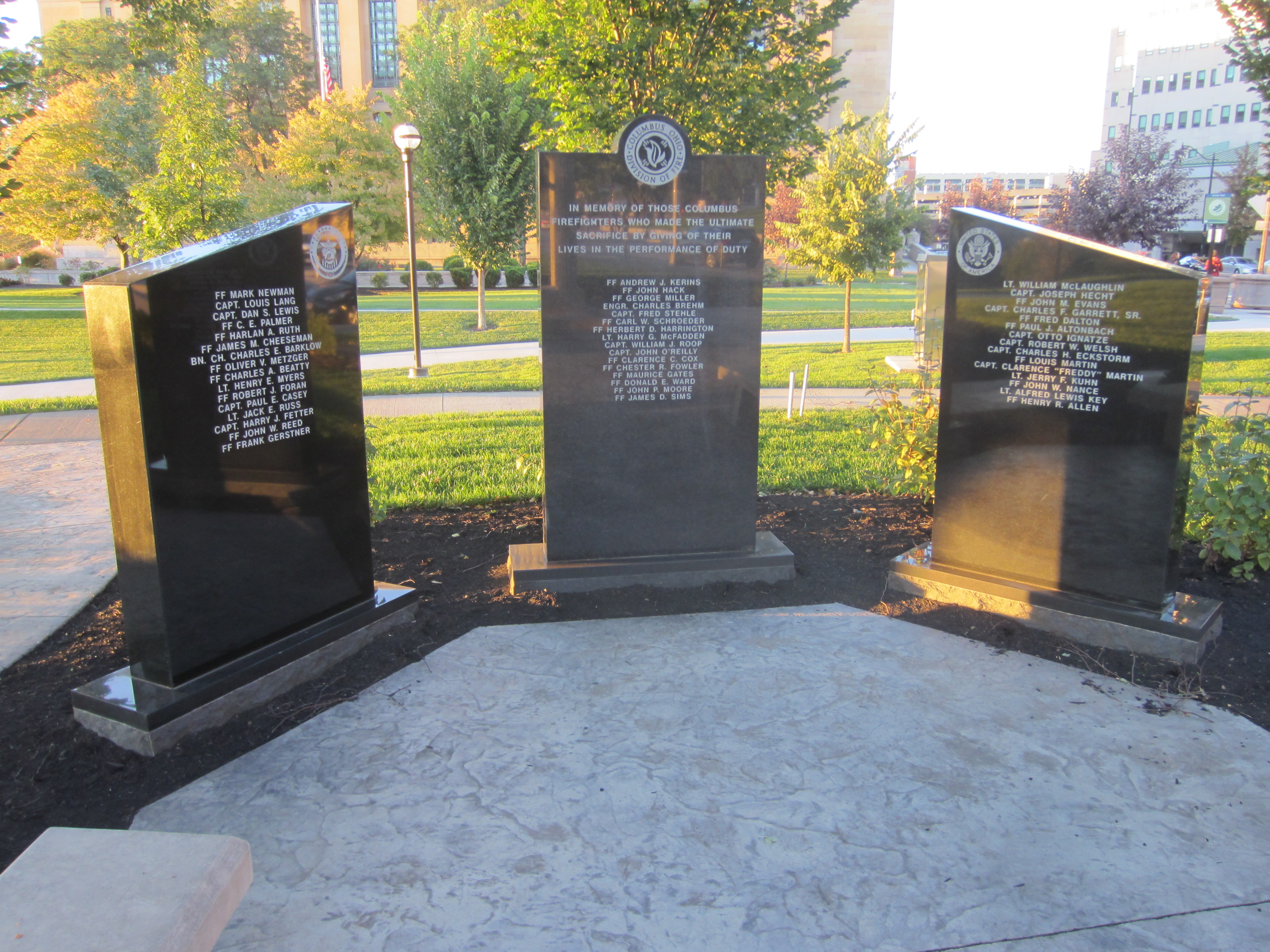
Part of the memorial, 2018

The Columbus Firefighters Memorial, or Firefighters' Memorial, is a monument commemorating firefighters who died while serving by Ed Nothaker, installed in Columbus, Ohio's Battelle Riverfront Park, in the United States. It was erected in 1958 and features an eternal flame on top of Greek columns.

The memorial was dedicated on April 13, 1958, and rededicated on October 16, 1988. It was surveyed by the Smithsonian Institution's "Save Outdoor Sculpture!" program in 1993.

== See also ==
- 1958 in art
- Ohio Police and Fire Memorial Park
