= Scioto Lounge =

Sculpture series in Columbus, Ohio, U.S.

- One of the deer sculptures in Genoa Park, 2018
- Artist: Terry Allen
- Year: 2014
- Medium: Bronze sculpture
- Location: Columbus, Ohio, United States

Scioto Lounge, or the Scioto Lounge deer sculptures, is a series of three bronze sculptures depicting anthropomorphic deer by Terry Allen, installed in Columbus, Ohio, United States. Two of the sculptures are installed in Genoa Park, and a third is installed on the Rich Street Bridge, posed like a pedestrian leaning its "forearms" on the railing while looking out over the Scioto River. The pieces were installed in 2014.

== See also ==
- 2014 in art
