= Union Station (mural) =

Mural in Columbus, Ohio, U.S.

- Year: 1987
- Condition: Hidden from view
- Location: 612 N. High St., Columbus, Ohio
- 39°58′29.7″N 83°00′10.8″W

Union Station is a two-story tall mural in the Short North and Italian Village neighborhoods in Columbus, Ohio. The mural was painted by Gregory and Jeff Ackers facing a parking lot in the commercial district. The work has been lost or hidden from view since about 2014, when a hotel was built on the parking lot site.

== History ==
Created by Gregory Ackers, it covers a portion of the north wall of Blick (formerly Utrecht) Art Supplies at 612 N. High St. and depicts the historic Union Station. It was created in 1987 – a decade after the station's demolition. The work was painted at the behest of the organization Citizens for a Better Skyline. On June 21, 1987, the organization held a public celebration of the mural's completion at the site.

It was located across a parking lot of another well-known Ackers-created mural, Trains. Greg Ackers restored both works in 1998.

By 2012, the mural was deteriorating, with chipping paint leading to large sections of the mural being lost. The other mural was noted to be in decent shape, however. Around 2014, the hotel Le Méridien Columbus, The Joseph was built on the space that served as a parking lot and both murals can no longer be seen. Also lost during the project was a mural, Cliff Dwellers, based on the 1913 George Bellows painting.

Artist Gregory Ackers responded to the planned development eliminating his work in 2012: "The way I see it, some things in life are permanent and some things are temporary. Acceptance is a hard thing, but I accept it."
