= Robert Huff (artist) =

Miami painter, sculptor, and printmaker

Robert Huff (1945–2014) was a painter, printmaker, sculptor and former professor and chairman of the art department at Miami Dade College, Kendall Campus.

== Background and education ==
Huff was born in Kalamazoo, Michigan and moved to Dunedin, Florida at age 11. His family worked within the construction trade and that influenced him from a young age. He attended University of South Florida (USF) initially on an engineering track but after encountering a small Monet painting he switched to art. He graduated with a Bachelor of Arts in 1968, then received his Master of Fine Arts from USF in 1968.

== Career ==
Huff arrived in Miami in 1968 and began teaching sculpture art at Miami Dade College, becoming the chair of the department in 1979 until his retirement in 2005. Huff taught various Miami artists who went on to national acclaim such as Robert Chambers, Luis Gispert and Karen Rifas. They were all featured together in Paul Clemence and Julie Davidow's 2007 book, Miami Contemporary Artists.

During his tenure he became a widely-exhibited artist, with over 20 solo exhibits between 1971-2012, and was commissioned for various public art installations in Miami-Dade and Broward County.The Museum of Art and Design (MOAD)at Miami Dade College presented the survey exhibition “Robert Huff: 49 Years,” highlighting the artist’s versatility in many media, from drawing to painting to printmaking to sculpture.

== Public art commissions ==
Untitled (HR Day Trip), 2008

East West, 2003

Lakeside Days #7, 1988

Passage Suite #7, 1987

Passage Suite #9, 1987

Argosy, 1976

After Leningrad #10, n.d.

Untitled (Transpontine Tile Maquette), n.d.

Gateways (Terminal 3-4 Connector), n.d.

== Selected solo exhibitions ==
Robert Huff: 47 Years, Miami Dade College Museum of Art + Design, Miami, FL, 2015

Robert Huff, Wall Constructions, Piedmont Virginia Community College, Charlottesville, Virginia, 2007

Robert Huff, Sculpture and Painting, Kendall Campus Art Gallery, Miami Dade Community College, Miami, FL, 1997

Robert Huff, Gloria Luria Gallery, Bay Harbor Islands, FL, 1987

Gallery at 24, Miami, FL, 1985

Miller / Pappas Gallery, Tampa, FL1982

Gallery West, West Palm Beach, FL 1972

== Personal life ==
After Huff retired from teaching, he and his wife of 27 years Miami-Dade Public Librarian Barbara Young, spent their time between Miami and Virginia. Their second home in Virginia was dubbed "Camp High Rock" as it had formerly been a Boy Scout Camp.

Huff passed from cancer on August 22, 2014 at the age of 69.
