= Intersect (Canneto) =

Sculpture by Stephen Canneto in Columbus, Ohio, U.S.

- The sculpture in 2018
- Artist: Stephen Canneto
- Year: 1992
- Location: Columbus, Ohio, United States
- 39°57′43.2″N 83°0′3.0″W

Intersect is an outdoor 1992 bronze and stainless steel sculpture by Stephen Canneto, installed on Capitol Square at the intersection of Broad and High streets in Columbus, Ohio, United States.

== Description and history ==
The Smithsonian Institution offers the following description: "Crafted from bronze, a historically old material, and modern stainless steel, it symbolizes the confluence of history and technology. Notches cut in the top pieces act as a wind instrument when the breeze swirls around it. Three bronze graceful forms intersect at the top while three stainless steel 'lightning bolts' intersect near the middle. Water flows down the bronze forms from a fountain set 6 feet high in the sculpture and into the 20 ft. x 20 ft. pool. The sculpture and surrounding pool rest on the ground in an irregular planting bed." The Smithsonian, which surveyed the artwork as part of its "Save Outdoor Sculpture!" program in 1992, also categorizes Intersect as abstract and allegorical, representing trade. Dedicated on August 12, 1992, the artwork measures approximately 35 x 20 x 20 ft., and weighs 15,000 lbs.

== See also ==
- 1992 in art
