= Celebration for a Champion =

Sculpture in Columbus, Ohio, U.S.

- Artist: Curtis Patterson
- Year: 1984
- Medium: Bronze sculpture
- Dimensions: 4.0 m (13 ft); 9.8 m diameter (32 ft)
- Location: Columbus, Ohio, United States
- 40°00′12″N 83°01′10″W

Celebration for a Champion is an outdoor bronze sculpture commemorating Jesse Owens' achievements by Curtis Patterson, installed on the Ohio State University campus in Columbus, Ohio, United States.

== Description and history ==
The abstract polished bronze artwork, dedicated on May 4, 1984, commemorates Jesse Owens' track and field career at Ohio State and the Olympics. It has four triangle-shaped pieces representing the world records he set at the Big Ten Conference in 1935 and his gold medals at the 1936 Summer Olympics. The sculpture is approximately 13 feet (4.0 m) tall and has a diameter of 32 feet (9.8 m). It rests on a brown brick and concrete that has a diameter of 37 feet (11 m) and weighs 15,000 lbs.

It is located in Jesse Owens Plaza immediately north of Ohio Stadium. Prior to remodeling, Ohio Stadium contained the track where Jesse ran while at Ohio State.

The sculpture cost $100,000. It was surveyed by the Smithsonian Institution's "Save Outdoor Sculpture!" program in 1994.

== See also ==
- 1984 in art
