= Genoa Park =

Park in Columbus, Ohio, U.S.

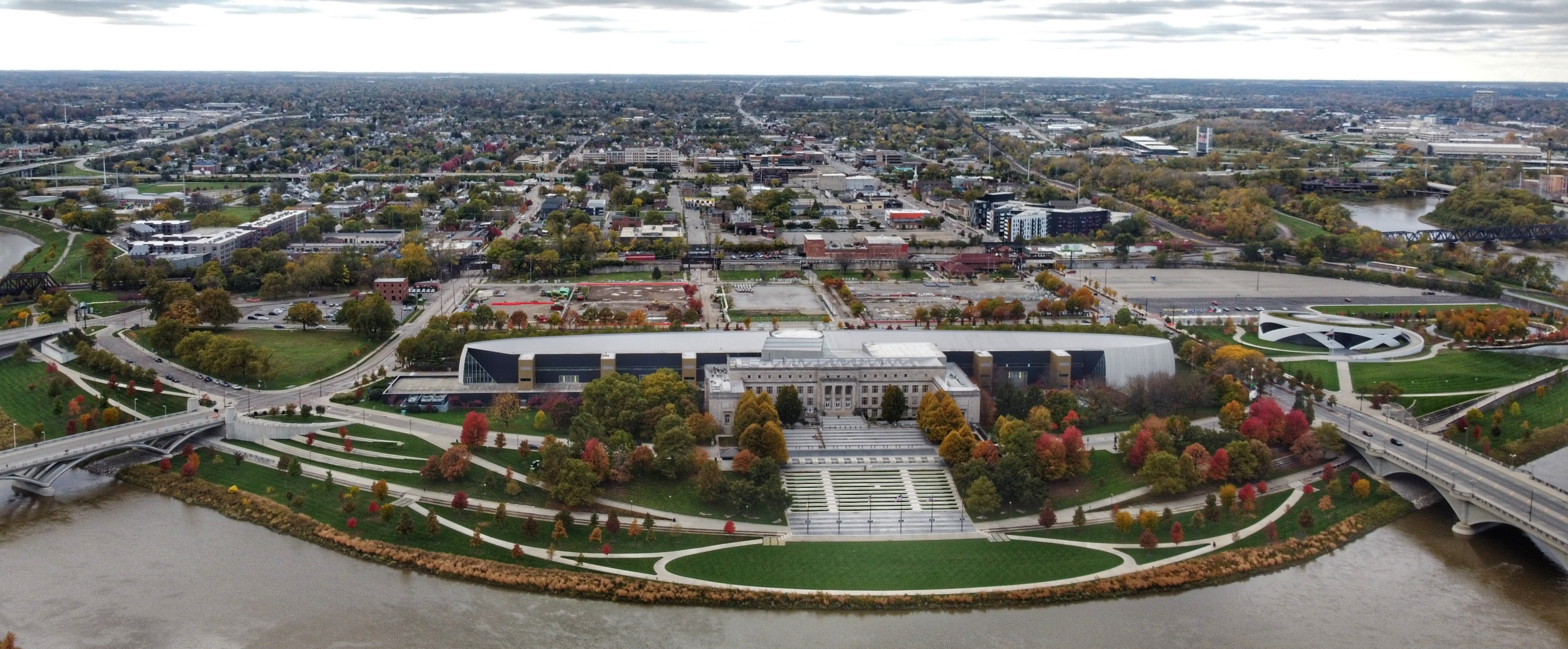
- The park wraps around the Scioto River by the COSI science museum
- Interactive map of Genoa Park
- Coordinates: 39°57′36″N 83°00′19″W
- Opened: 1999
- Administrator: Columbus Recreation and Parks Department
- Public transit: 10, 12; CoGo
- Website: Official website

Genoa Park is a 2.07-acre (0.84 ha) urban park along the west bank of the Scioto River in Columbus, Ohio, United States. The park, located between Broad and Rich Streets as part of the Scioto Mile park grouping, is named after Genoa, the birthplace of Christopher Columbus and one of Columbus' sister cities. It opened in 1999.

== History ==
The park was expanded from 2011 to 2015, along with the parks along the entire Scioto River. The river was stagnant and muddy due to the Main Street Dam, a low head dam built in 1918 to control flooding, but which doubled the width of the river to 600 feet (180 m). The dam removal in 2013, along with sediment removal, narrowed the river to 300 feet (91 m), giving the city access to 33 acres (13 ha) of previously submerged shoreline. The parks have helped revitalize the city's downtown area.

== Attributes ==
The park follows the curve of the Scioto River on its western bank. The Oval, an open green space, was underwater prior to the Main Street Dam removal in 2013.

The park features an amphitheater and fountains. Public artwork and monuments include Celebration of Life, the Columbus Police Memorial, several works as part of Scioto Lounge, and the statue of Lucas Sullivant.

The river bank features a riparian zone, a natural line of plants along the river, keeping soil from eroding into the water.

== Gallery ==
Before the park's construction, 1974

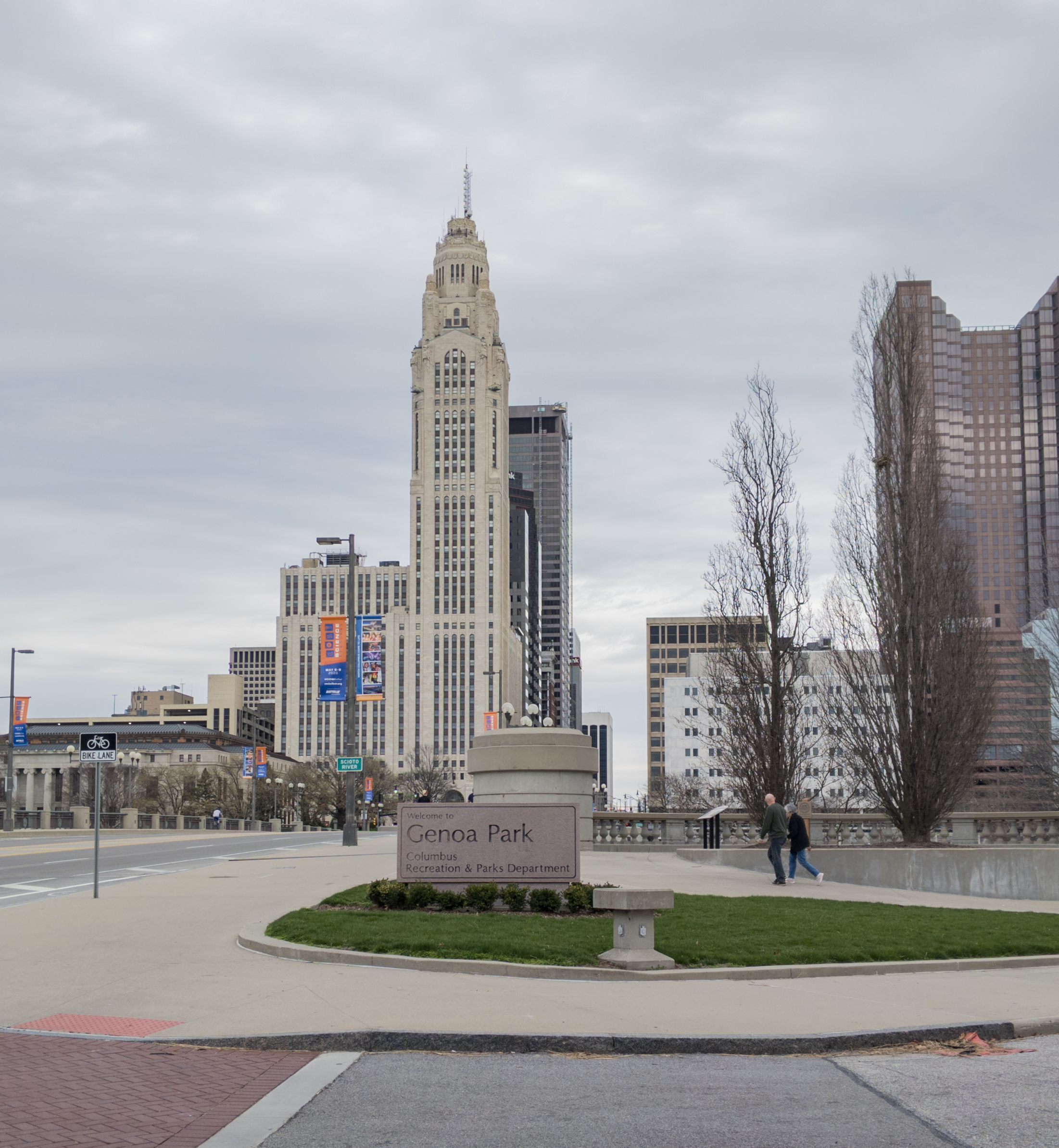
Park sign by Broad Street

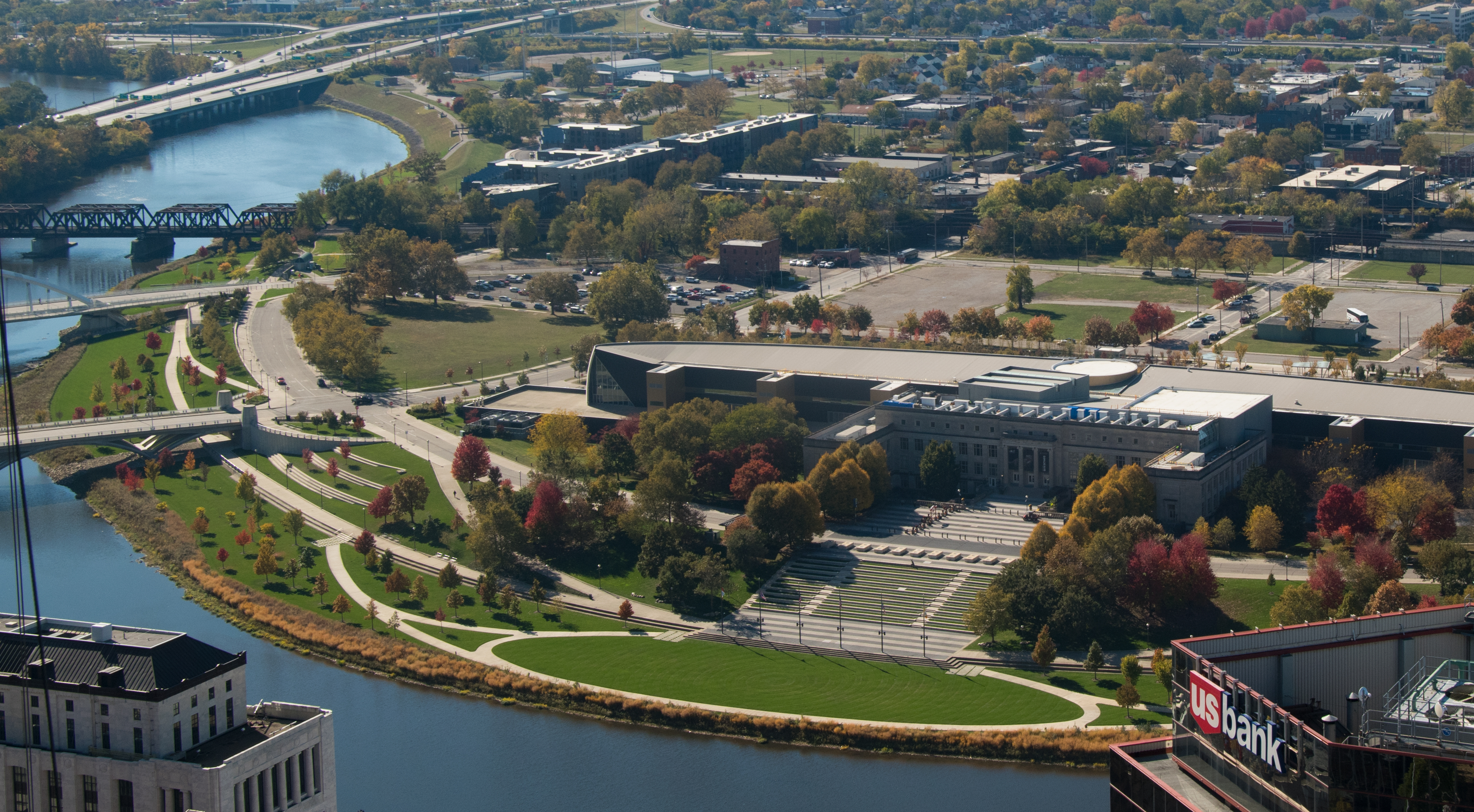
View from Rhodes State Office Tower

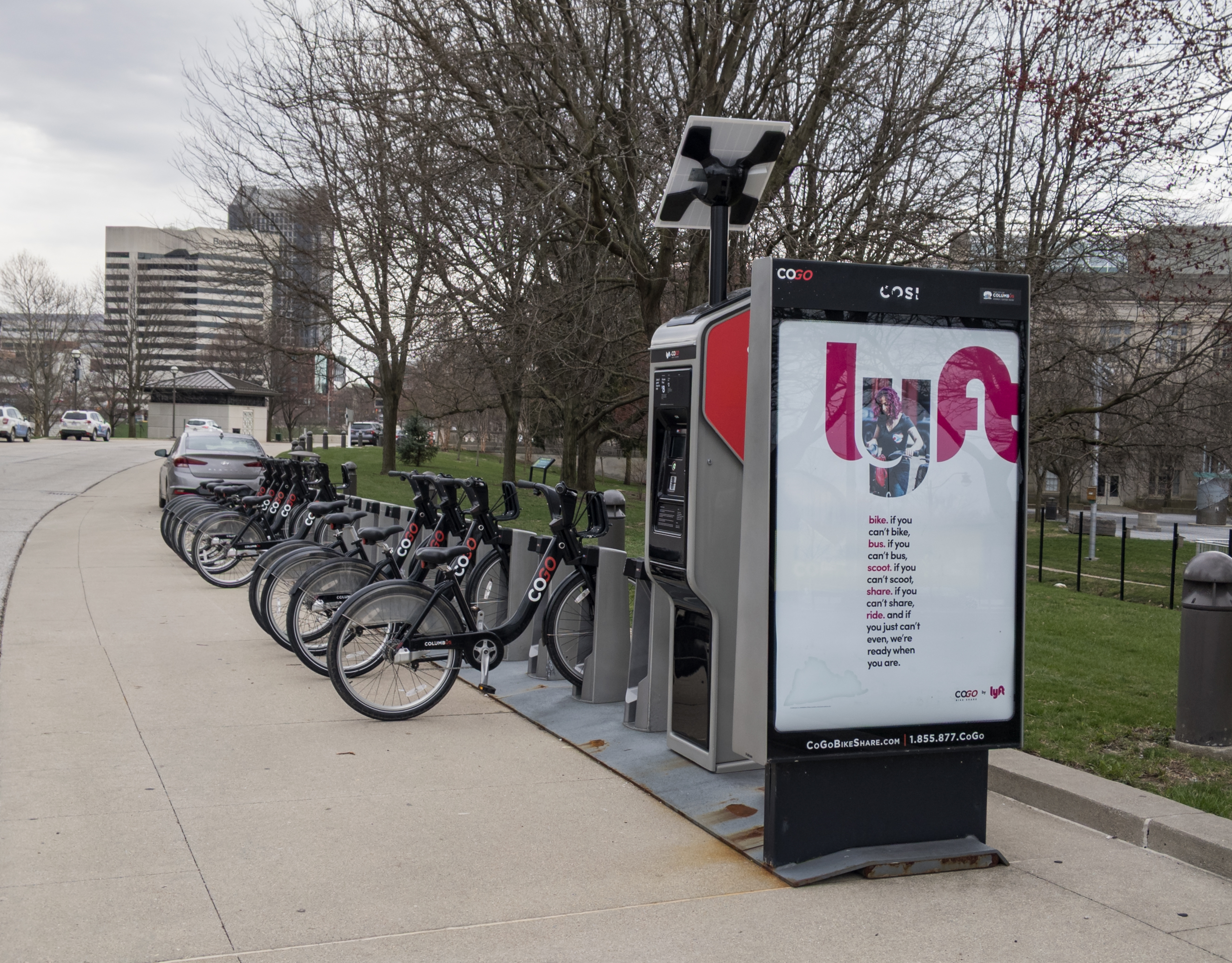
CoGo bikeshare station

== See also ==
- List of parks in Columbus, Ohio
