= Scioto Mile Promenade =

Park and promenade in Columbus, Ohio, U.S.

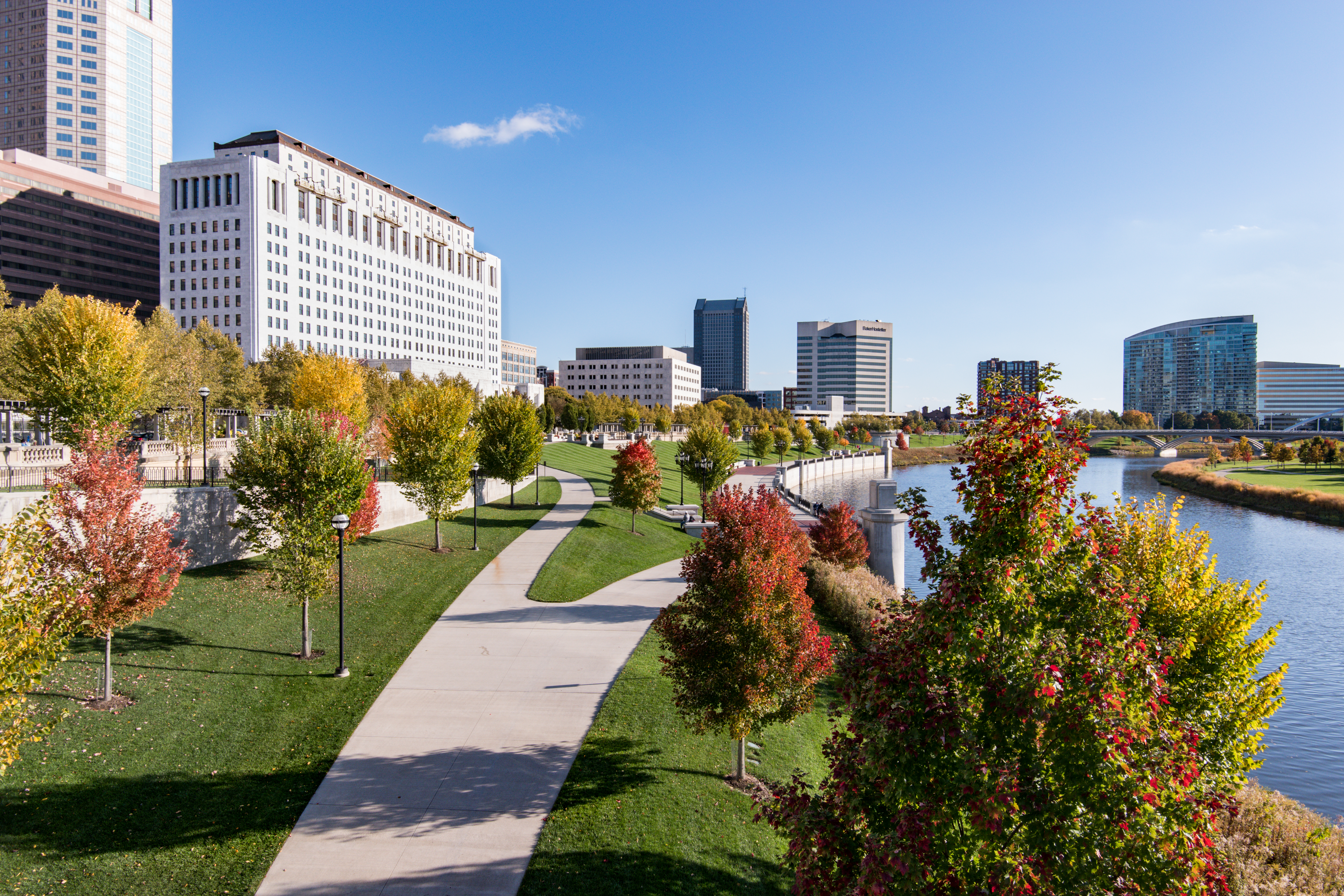
- Interactive map of Scioto Mile Promenade
- Location: 79 Civic Center Drive, Columbus, Ohio
- Coordinates: 39°57′37″N 83°00′12″W
- Opened: July 7, 2011
- Administrator: Columbus Recreation and Parks Department
- Public transit: 4, 5, 7, 10, 11; CoGo
- Website: Official website

The Scioto Mile Promenade, also known simply as the Promenade, is a public park and promenade in downtown Columbus, Ohio. The park is part of the Scioto Mile network of parks and trails around the city's downtown area, and has a riverwalk stretching along the east bank of the Scioto River, from Battelle Riverfront Park to Bicentennial Park.

The promenade has a multi-use trail, part of the Scioto Greenway Trail, used by bicyclists, pedestrians and runners.

== History ==
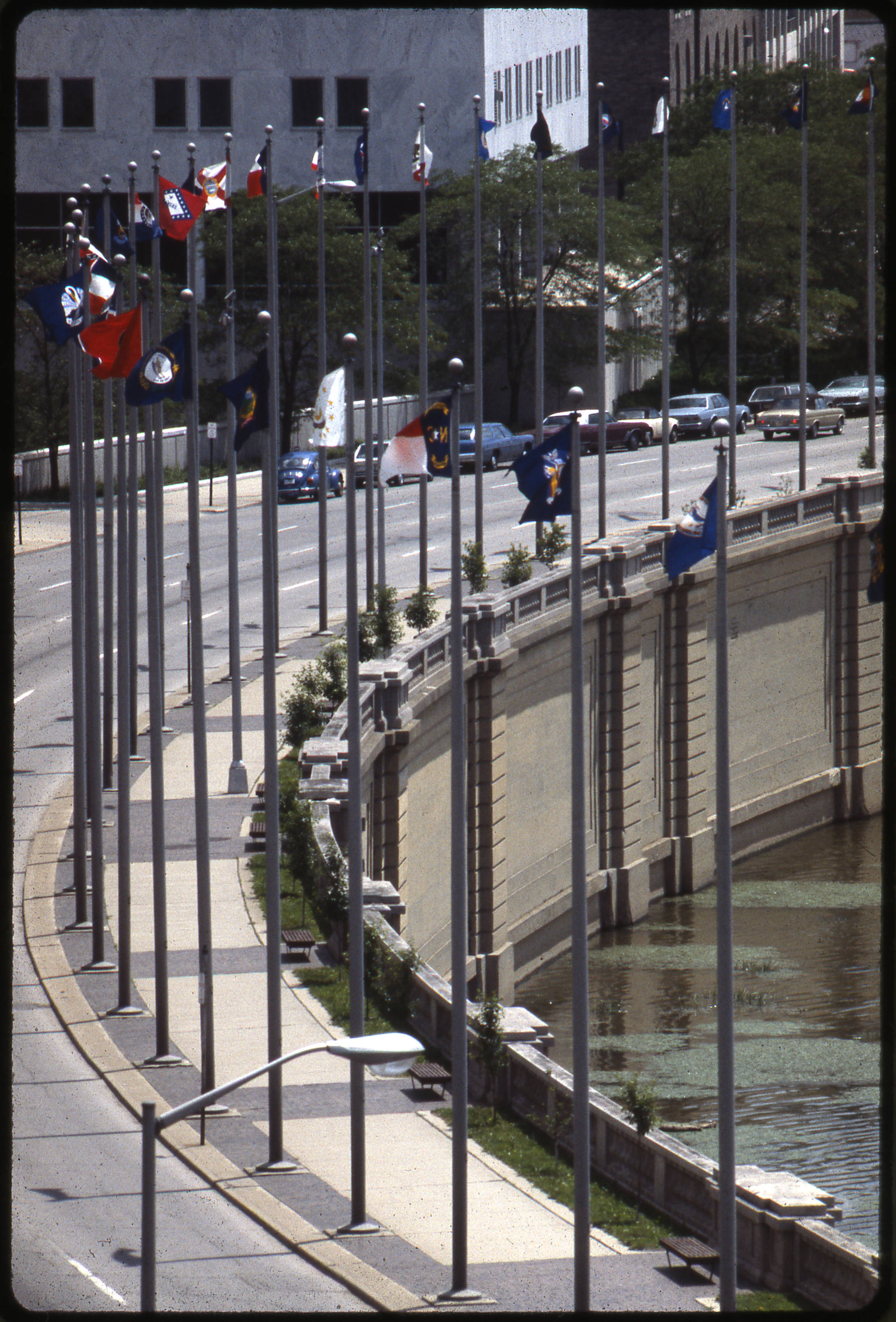
The Promenade in the late 1900s

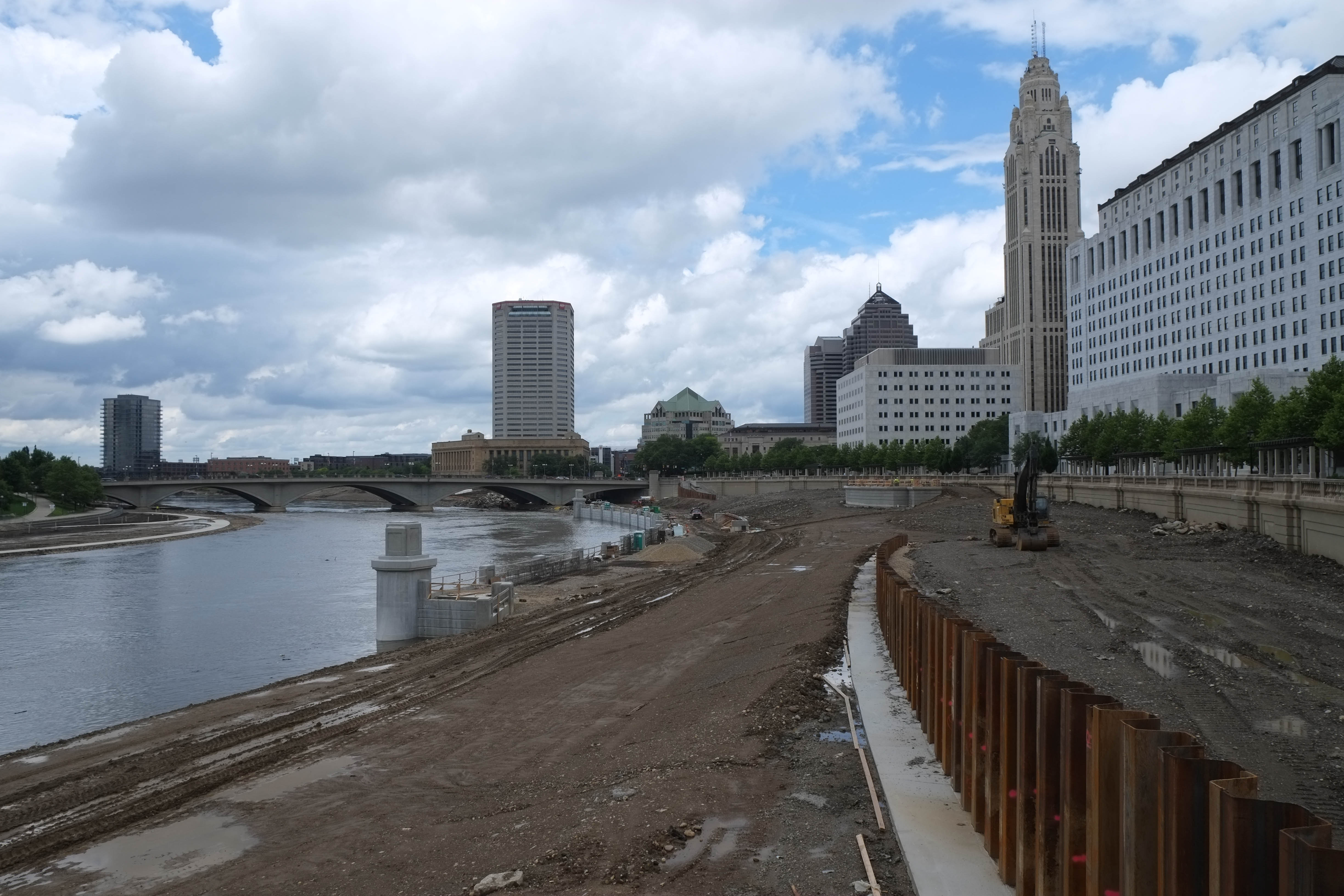
Creating the park space in 2015

When Columbus was founded, the only planned green spaces downtown were around the Ohio Statehouse and in front of the Carnegie Library. The 1908 Columbus Plan urged the removal of the numerous factories, coal yards, boarding houses, and tenements stretching along the riverfront downtown. The city's prison, storage facilities, and a junk shop were also located on the riverfront there. The plan was not directly adopted, but the Great Flood of 1913 in Columbus destroyed many of these buildings. In 1920, the city pushed for a remade riverfront, though its bond issue did not receive enough public approval. The "Avenue of Flags", flagpoles along Civic Center Drive with each of the 50 state flags, was dedicated on Columbus Day in 1967. The flags were replaced with 25 Ohio flags and 25 Columbus flags in 2002, because of complaints about Confederate symbols on other states' flags.

The original Scioto Mile Promenade was planned around 2007, with only the park's street-level walkway to be developed from April 2008 to fall 2009. Construction of "the Riverwalk" park space was planned to be completed later on. The walkway portion of the park opened on July 7, 2011.

The park space was constructed from 2011 to 2015. The riverfront road Civic Center Drive was reduced from five to three lanes, and the park space along the entire Scioto River was redeveloped at this time. The river was stagnant and muddy due to the Main Street Dam, a low head dam built in 1918 to control flooding, but which doubled the width of the river to 600 feet (180 m). The dam removal in 2013, along with sediment removal, narrowed the river to 300 feet (91 m), giving the city access to 33 acres (13 ha) of previously-submerged shoreline. The parks have helped revitalize the city's downtown area.

From about 2011 to 2014, Ron Pizzuti, founder of the Pizzuti Collection, planned to finance construction of a six-story sculpture on the Promenade. "Columbiad", designed by New York artist Brian Tolle, was to be an hourglass-shaped steel sculpture built on the Prow portion of the park.

== Attributes ==
The Scioto Mile Promenade includes a 30-foot-wide (9.1 m) street-level promenade stretching from Broad to Town Streets, connecting Battelle Riverfront Park with Bicentennial Park. Fountains and benches line the promenade. The entire park follows the curve of the Scioto River on the eastern bank, below the Ohio Judicial Center, home of the Ohio Supreme Court.

Within the park lies Huntington Plaza, an open-air space directly across the street from the Ohio Judicial Center. It features seasonal flowers and three infinity-style fountains. The fountains include 44 sculpted bronze fish in their designs.

Coleman's Pointe, an overlook onto the Scioto River, is beside the plaza, extending toward the river. The space is used for viewing Genoa Park night lighting and for wedding ceremonies. It is named for Michael Coleman, mayor of Columbus at the time it was built.

The Lower River Walk slopes down between the street-level promenade and Scioto River. It includes park space, walking paths, and built-in stone seating. The river bank features a riparian zone, a natural line of plants along the river, keeping soil from eroding into the water.

The Prow, an observation platform, is situated at the south end of the park. It includes stone benches, lanterns, and a grove of birch trees. The platform was a re-utilized portion of the Town Street Bridge (1917-2009), replaced in 2012 by the Rich Street Bridge.

== Gallery ==
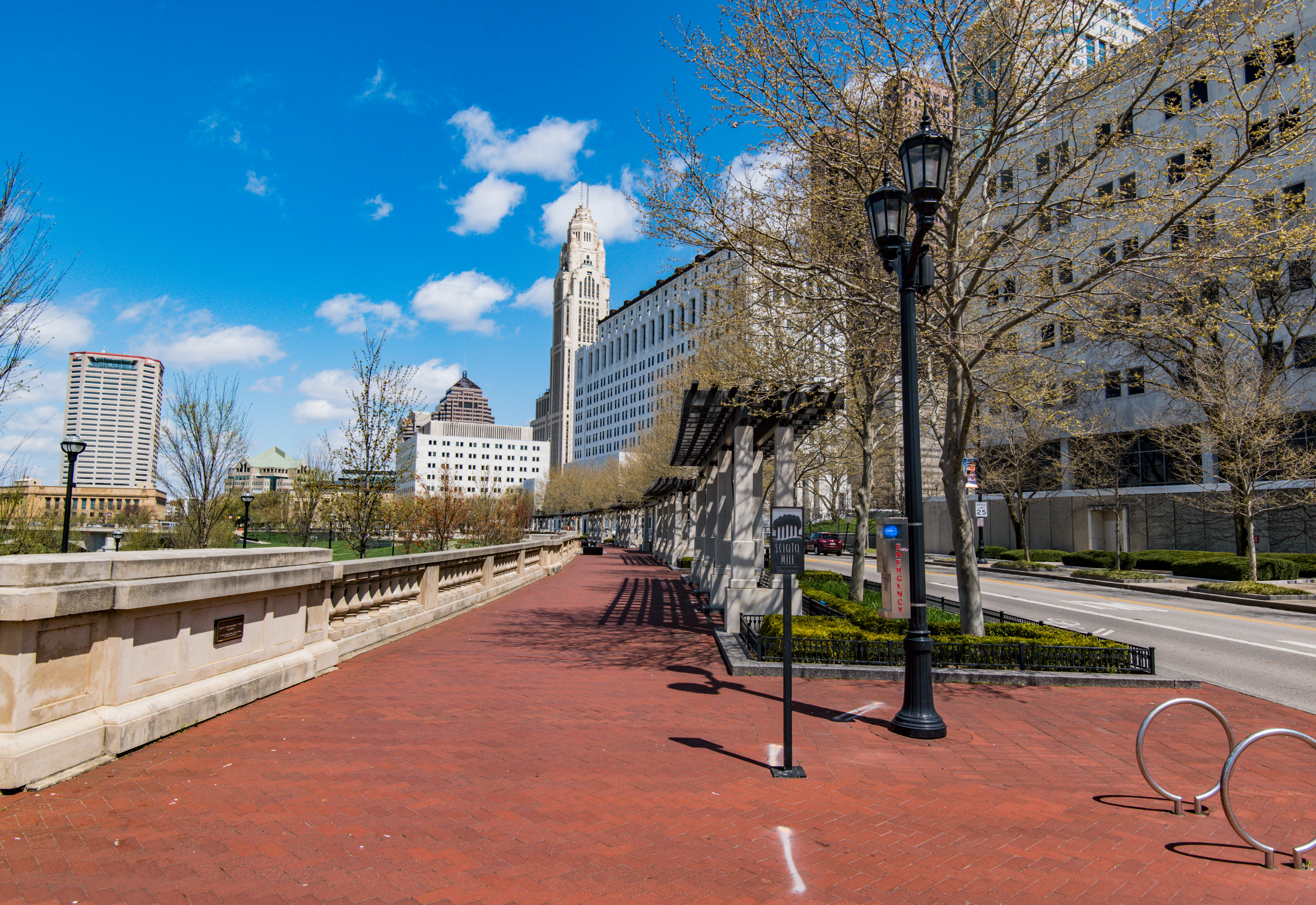
Promenade walkway

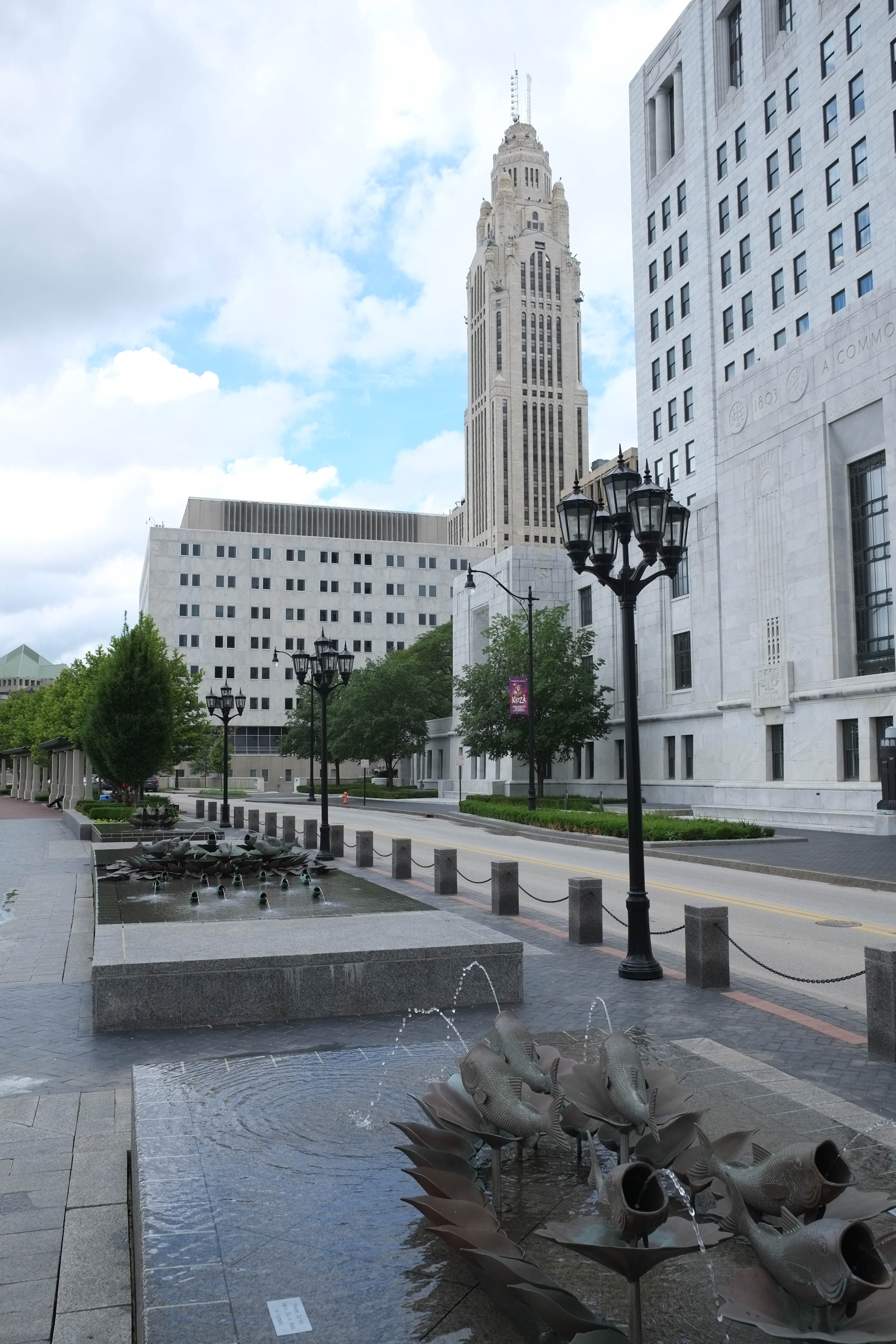
Huntington Plaza

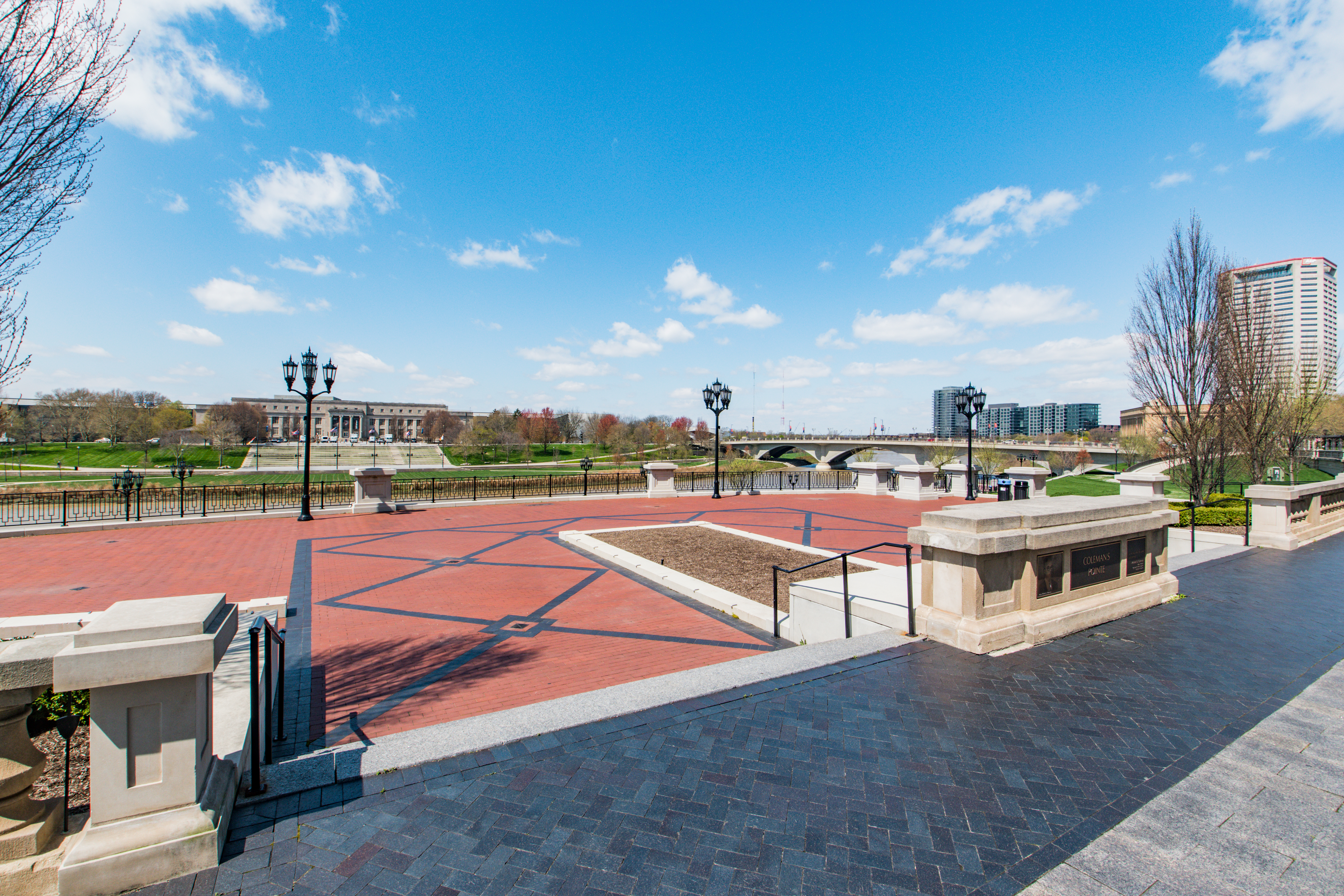
Coleman's Pointe

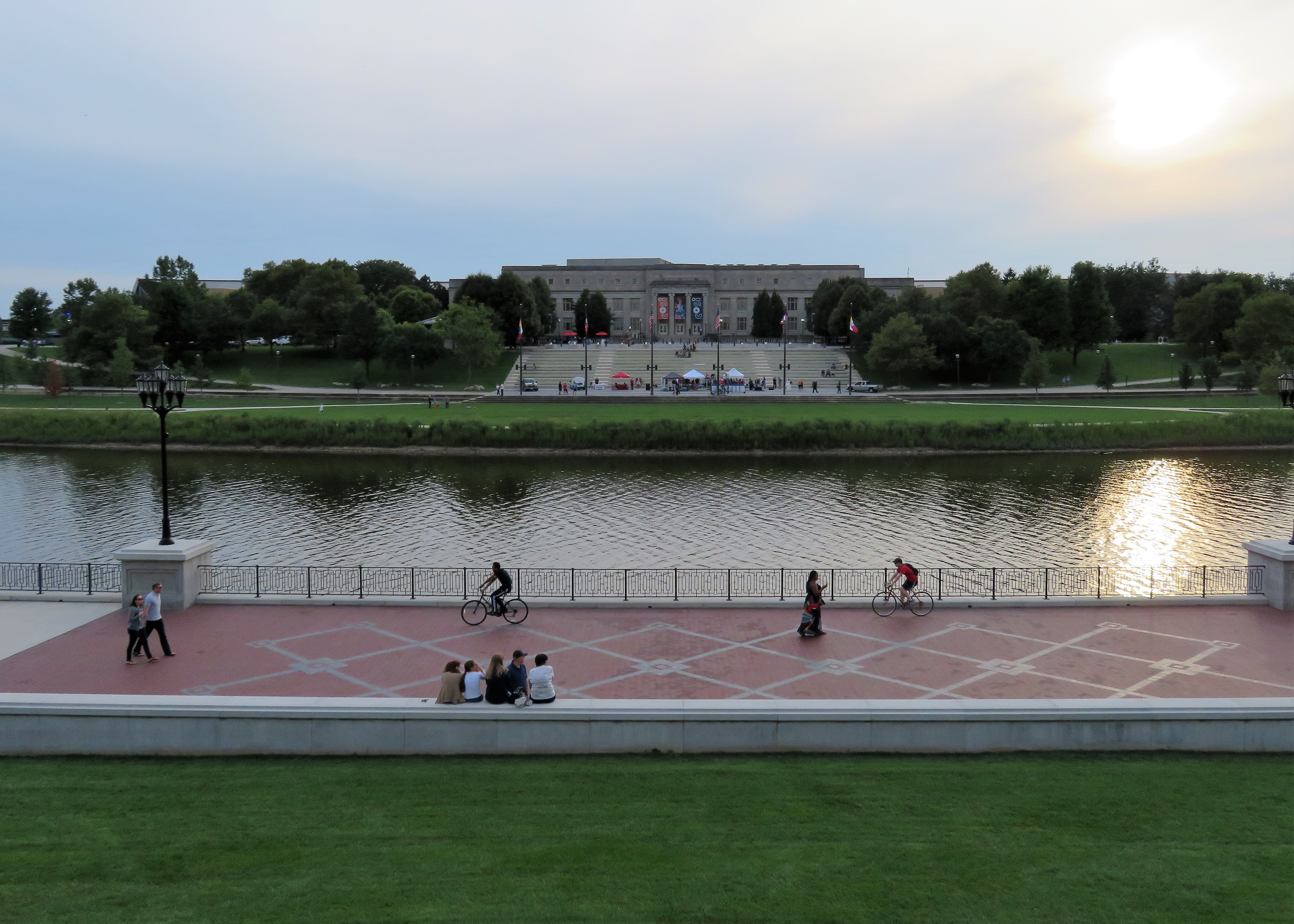
Plaza on the Lower River Walk

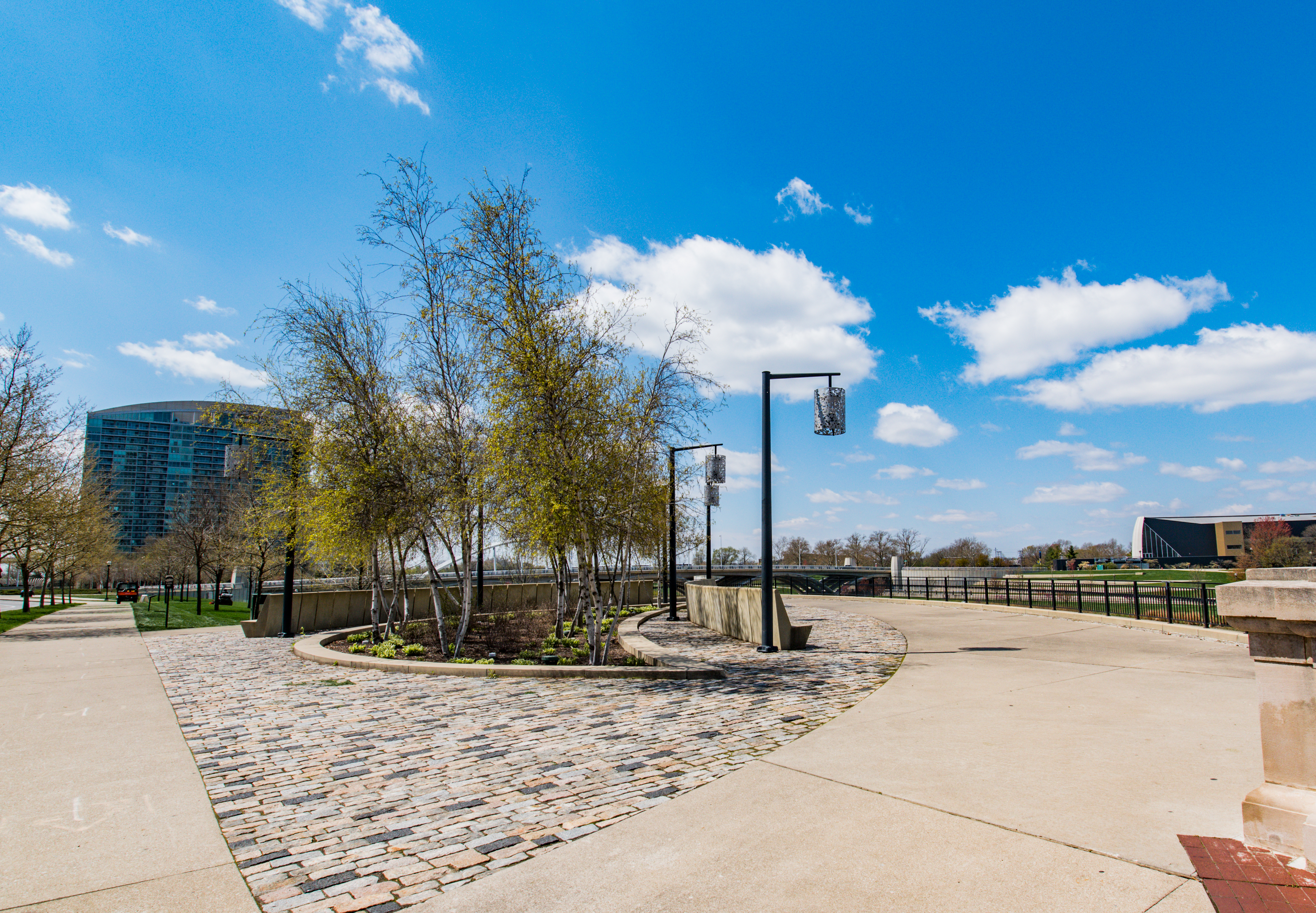
The Prow

== See also ==
- List of parks in Columbus, Ohio
