= Dorrian Green =

Park in Columbus, Ohio, U.S.

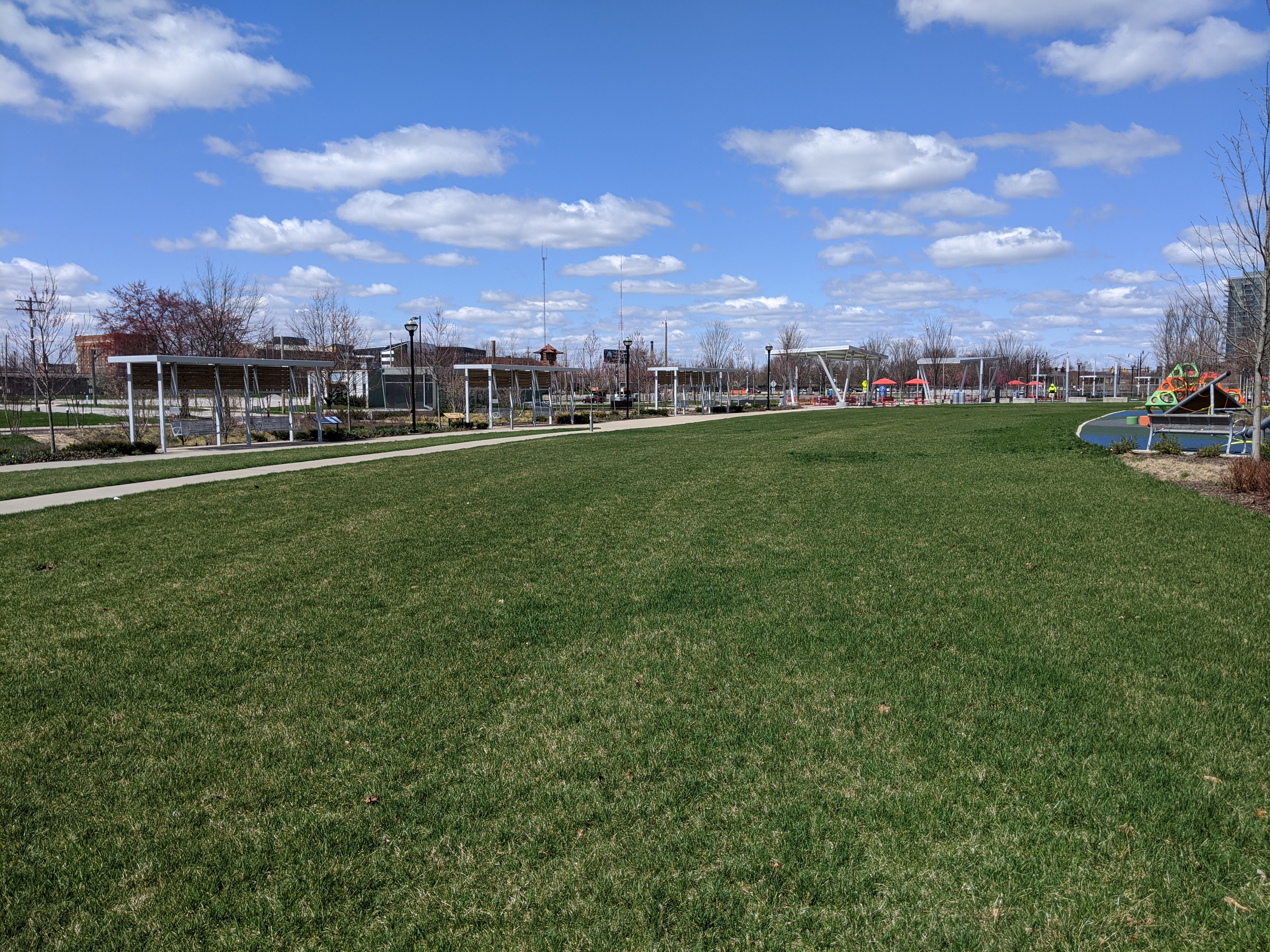
- Interactive map of Dorrian Green
- Location: 50 South Belle St, Columbus, Ohio
- Coordinates: 39°57′35″N 83°00′29″W
- Administrator: Columbus Recreation and Parks Department
- Public transit: 3, 6, 9, 10, 12; CoGo
- Website: Official website

Dorrian Green is a park by the Franklinton neighborhood of Columbus, Ohio. The park is part of the Scioto Mile network of parks and trails around downtown Columbus. Dorrian Green neighbors COSI, the city's science and children's museum.

The park has numerous gardens: sensory, reading, butterfly and pollinator, and prairie. There is a plaza with an interactive fountain, flanked by two pavilions and flowering cherry tree groves. The park's northwest and southwest corners have limestone structures salvaged from the Central High School building that was repurposed and expanded into COSI. There are play areas for children and adults. "The Spectrum Tree", a kinetic tree-shaped sculpture, references Isaac Newton's discovery that sunlight contains the entire spectrum of colors. The park is named for Hugh J. Dorrian, the city's treasurer and auditor, working for the city for 52 years. Dorrian was a Franklinton resident, and helped revitalize the Short North, the Arena District, University District, Scioto Mile and Franklinton.

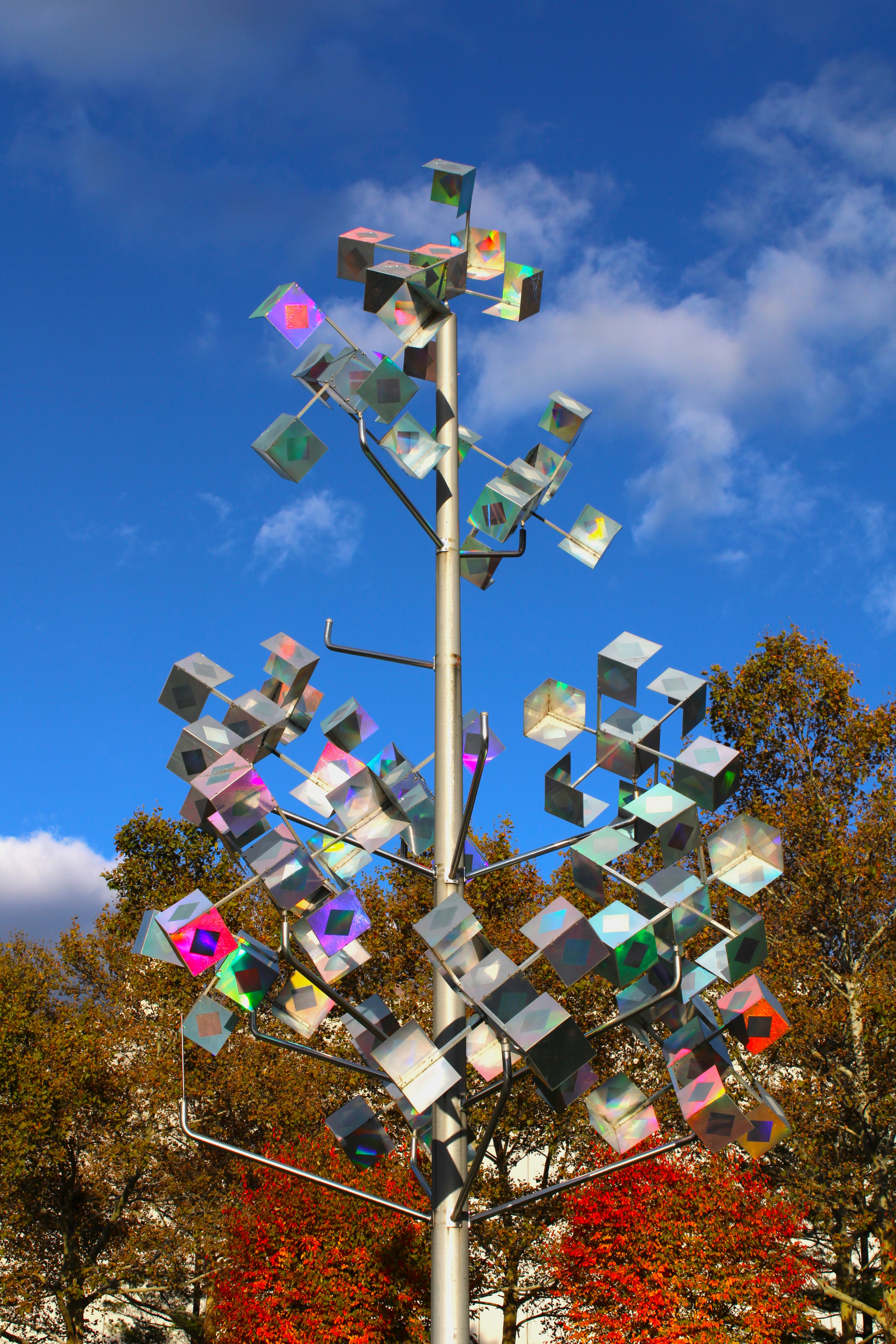
The Spectrum Tree in November 2023

== See also ==
- List of parks in Columbus, Ohio
