= Melvin Dodge =

American civil servant

Melvin B. Dodge (February 15, 1924 – August 19, 1991) was director of the Columbus Recreation and Parks Department and president of the Greater Columbus Convention and Visitors Bureau. City official publicly declared that Melvin Dodge was the heart and soul of Columbus. Most notably, Dodge is attributed to be one of the handful of people who built Columbus, Ohio.

== Biography ==
Melvin Dodge entered the US Army in World War II in January 1943. He earned a "Sharpshooter Medal" and was promoted to Sergeant on August 11, 1943. Soon after, he was admitted into the Army Air Corps, then to Air Force, but returned to ground combat with Company D. 353rd Infantry then to the 89th Infantry under the command of General George Patton. Later, he received a commission in Army Reserves, led Military Intelligence Unit at Fort Hayes and retired as Major.

In 1951, Dodge graduated from the Ohio State University with a degree in education.

Shortly after graduation, he was hired by the Columbus Recreation and Parks Department to oversee Sunshine Park. Working his way up in the department, he became the director of the department in 1967. As director, he led the development of the Cultural Arts Center and Bicentennial Park. He is also credited with hiring Jack Hanna who brought national recognition to the Columbus Zoo. Starting in 1977, he served on the zoo association's board of trustees and became a member of the Franklin County Executive Board of the Columbus Zoo beginning in 1985.

Jack Hanna said of Dodge, "there was nobody better, and there will never be anyone better, in raising money for the city. He could take a lemon and turn it into lemonade." Consistently, one common theme can be found within all the newspaper articles that were written about him: He had a disarming sense of humor to raise funds for his beloved zoo. Edwards, Switzer and Hoover write "He took camels to the statehouse, llamas to the newspaper and once, an elephant to the office of a local banker." The city of Columbus developed a world class zoo because of Dodge's strategic use of humor.

He left the department in 1985 and Sunshine Park was renamed Dodge Park in honor of his service. In 1985, he became the president of the Greater Columbus Convention & Visitors Bureau until his death in August 1991. As president, he devised the funding for the expansion of the Greater Columbus Convention Center through a hotel-motel tax.

== Death and legacy ==
Dodge died on August 19, 1991, after a long illness.

After his death, the Columbus Zoological Association established the Melvin B. Dodge-Columbus Zoo Educational Scholarship Fund to provide educational scholarships for children whose parents cannot afford the activities. He was inducted into the Columbus Hall of Fame in 1991.
