= COSI =

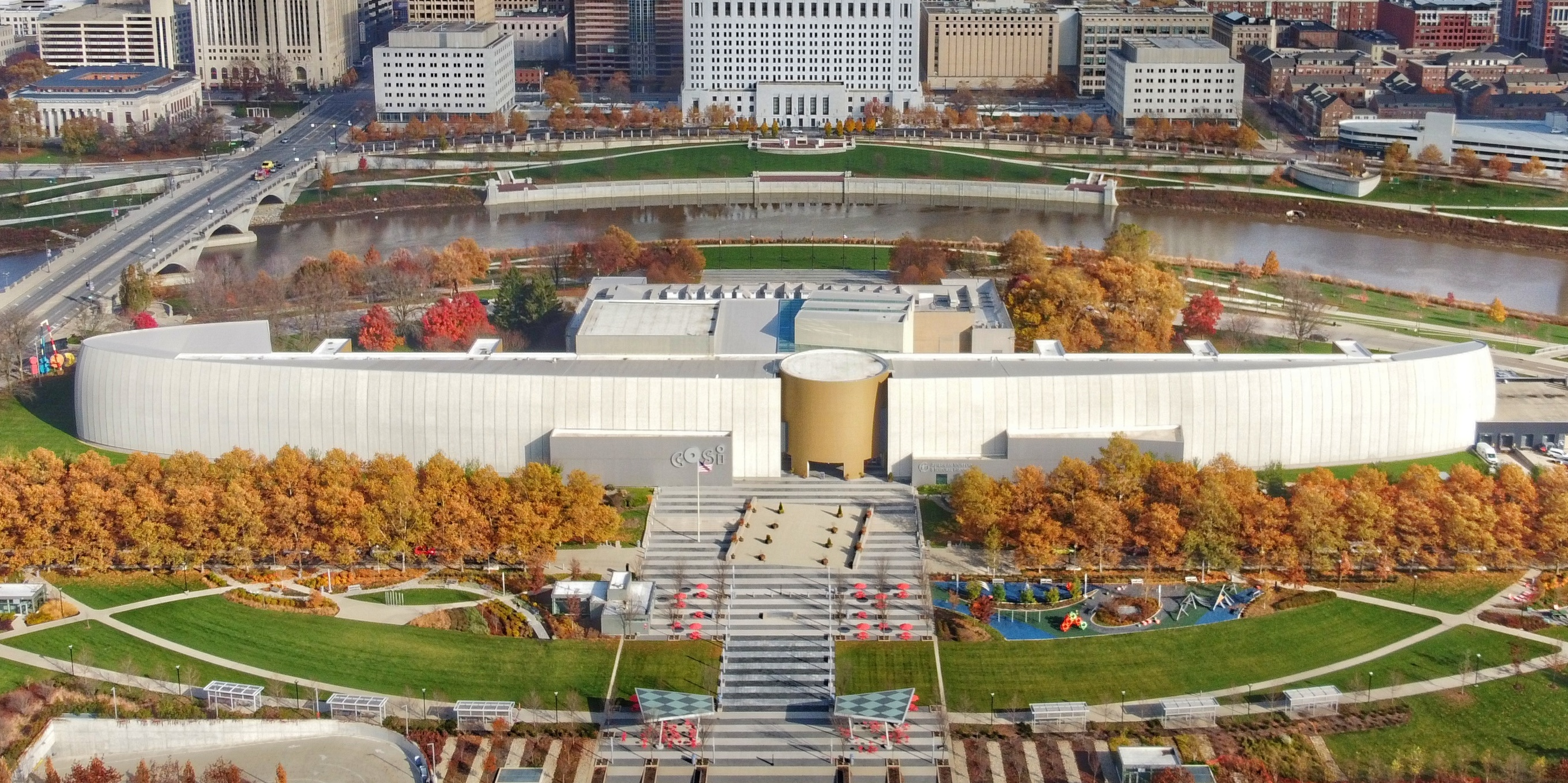
- West facade and Dorrian Green
- Established: 1964
- Location: Columbus, Ohio
- Coordinates: 39°57′35″N 83°00′25″W
- Type: Science museum
- Founder: Sanford N. Hallock II
- CEO: Frederic Bertley
- Chairperson: Tom Dailey
- Public transit access: 10, 12; CoGo
- Website: www.cosi.org

COSI (/ˈkoʊsaɪ/), officially the Center of Science and Industry, is a science museum and research center in Columbus, Ohio. COSI was opened to the public on 29 March 1964 and remained there for 35 years. In 1999, COSI was moved to a 30000 m^{2} (320000 sq ft) facility, designed by Japanese architect Arata Isozaki along a bend in the Scioto River in the Franklinton neighborhood. COSI features more than 300 interactive exhibits throughout themed exhibition areas.

Until the COVID-19 pandemic, COSI operated the largest outreach education program of any science museum in the United States. Anchored by COSI on Wheels – a whole-school outreach program traveling throughout Ohio and the surrounding Midwest – as well as local COSI on Wheels Workshops, Camp COSI on Wheels, and Interactive Videoconference programs reaching 350000 learners each year outside of the museum at their peak.

As a non-profit organization, COSI is supported by ticket sales, a network of community and statewide partnerships (including relationships with a variety of donors and sponsors), a volunteer program supported by 10000 volunteers annually, and nearly 20000 member households. In 2008, COSI was named the #1 science center in the United States for families by Parent Magazine. In 2020, it was named the #1 Science Museum in the United States by USA Today.

== Exhibit areas ==
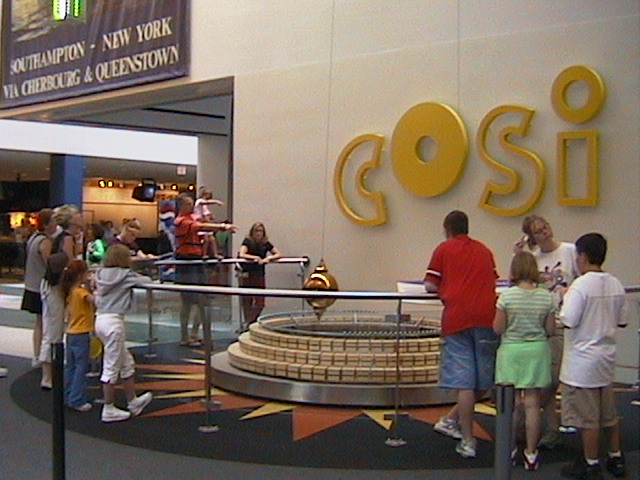
The museum's Foucault pendulum, located at the facility's west entrance.

Upon relocating in 1999, COSI was developed with large, self-contained, themed atria, each dedicated to a single topic and designed as immersive theatrical learning worlds. As of 2018, COSI contains seven main exhibit areas: Ocean, Energy Explorers, Space, Progress, Gadgets, Life, and the American Museum of National History Dinosaur Gallery. Hallways between each learning world are filled with hands-on exhibits and displays.

=== Ocean ===
Accessed via an underwater cave through a crashed shipwreck, the cavern path splits as guests pass to the right or left. The pathway to the right leads to a docked submarine laboratory where hands-on exhibits explore the realities of ocean research, submersibles, SCUBA, water pressure, and remote-operated vehicles. Lilypad Lab focuses on drainage basin and Central Ohio wildlife. The path forking left from the shipwreck leads to the Temple of Poseidon, an ancient stone chamber built around a 30-foot tall statue of Poseidon with waterfalls, fountains, and water jets. Another realm focuses on the properties of water and the stories it inspires – laminar flow, whirlpools, erosion, water bells, and mythology.

=== Energy Explorers ===
Energy Explorers, which opened in 2013, allows visitors to choose an avatar character that follows the guest to the Home Zone, Transportation Zone, and Product Zone of a town, making decisions via computer kiosks to balance energy efficiency and cost.

=== Space ===
The Space exhibit area features a replica space station pod to tour, a recreation of John Glenn's Friendship 7 spacecraft from the Mercury-Atlas 6, remote-operated vehicles, balance tests, and other hands-on experiments that deal with space flight trajectory, gravitational pull, and simulated rover landings. Space was originally located on Level 2 in its own enclosed atrium exhibit area, entered via a "black hole" spinning funhouse hallway meant to disorient guests. The exhibit itself was in a dark, immersive, themed area, stylized after the 1969 Moon landing of Apollo 11. Under starry skies, guests interacted with "retro" stylized monitors and exhibits with a matching wood-panel / brushed metal motif that was reminiscent of the era, even included a 1960s living room (including shag carpeting) where guests could watch the recorded landing.

When the south end of COSI's building was closed due to lost levies in 2004, the Space exhibit was relocated from Level 2 to an empty gallery on Level 1. In 2012, that area became Energy Explorers, necessitating yet another location switch. Some of the Space exhibits' displays moved to the Mezzanine Level while much remained in storage. With the re-opening of COSI's Planetarium in November 2014, the location of Space on the Mezzanine leading toward the Planetarium's lobby was reinforced by the return and refurbishment of the rest of Space's exhibits. However, Space remains the only one of COSI's seven learning worlds to not have its own dedicated, theatrical, immersive atrium, instead being located on the bright Mezzanine bridge. The original home of Space is now Gallery 3, available for traveling exhibits and special event rentals. Gallery 3 still contains the Galaxy Theater, fittingly still painted with murals of planets and stars leftover from its time as a live theater for Space.

=== Progress ===
The Progress exhibit (modeled after the Streets of Yesteryear exhibit at COSI's original location) traces the hopes and fears of a small town called Progress in 1898, just as electricity, horseless carriages, and canned food become available. The recreated town (specifically, the shops, homes, and restaurants at the corner of Hope Street and Fear Street) includes a telegraph office, livery, stable, grocer, apothecary, and clothiers. After visitors walk through Progress in 1898, they turn the corner and enter the same intersection of the same town 64 years later in 1962, where a new set of hopes and fears have arisen.

In 1962, the town of Progress includes an appliance store, a working TV studio, a radio station (where the telegraph office was), a department store, a diner, and a gas station (replacing the livery). At the exit, the exhibit challenges guests to consider how the streets of the village of Progress might look today, and to question why the concept of progress deserves as much weight in the scientific study as that of oceans, space, or energy.

=== Gadgets ===
The Gadgets exhibit area contains many classic science museum hands-on experiments, such as pulleys, wind tunnels, plasma globes, magnets, light bulbs, engines, and counterweights. As well, Gadgets contains the Gadgets Café, where families are seated and given a menu with quick science experiments to choose from. A take-apart menu allows visitors to disassemble donated phones, computers, clocks, and other electronic devices, which are recycled afterward.

=== Life ===
Life explores humanity through three separate areas dedicated to the mind, body, and spirit. The Mind area contains optical illusions, physical illusions, an anechoic chamber, and a posable zoetrope. Spirit discusses the concept of birth and death and how human cultures understand them. Body features interactive health stations where visitors can record their weight, flexibility, and heart rate, then compare their statistics to that of COSI visitors and national averages. Life also contains the Labs in Life, three working research pods staffed by OSU students and staff.

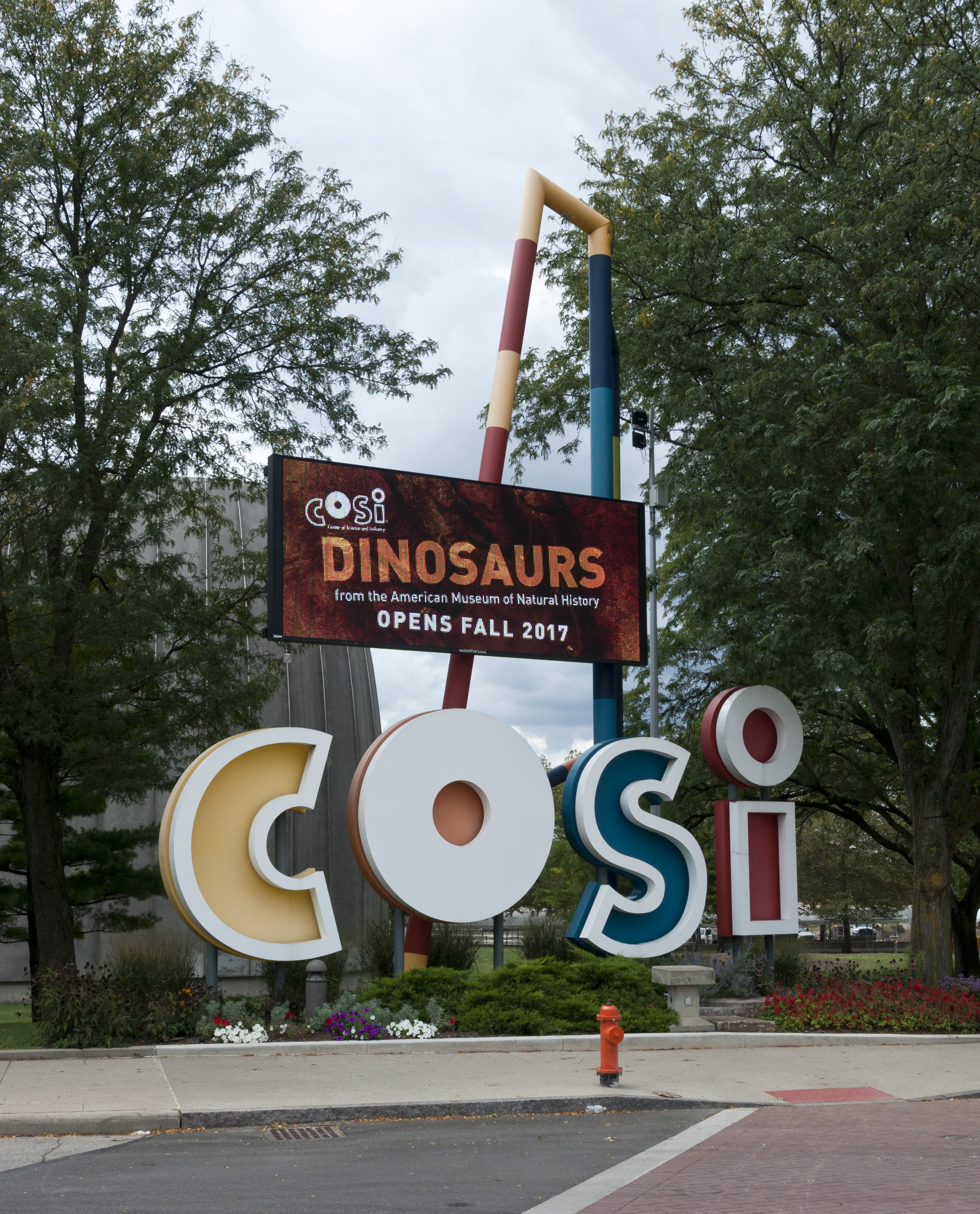

=== Dinosaur Gallery ===
On November 19 of 2017, COSI, in partnership with the American Museum of Natural History, opened a permanent Dinosaur Gallery. A traveling special exhibition gallery opened in the Spring of 2018. Together, they occupy 2000 m² in the first floor.

Much of the gallery uses elements from a retired AMNH touring exhibition titled Dinosaurs: Ancient Fossils, New Discoveries such as a diorama of feathered dinosaurs of the Yixian Formation.

=== Other features ===
The building also contains an interactive "little kid space" area designed for children up through first grade, the National Geographic Giant Screen Theater (the largest digital screen in Ohio), and an outdoor Big Science Park. On November 22, 2014, COSI reopened its 60-foot diameter, 220-seat Planetarium (Ohio's largest) with all new digital projection. In addition, there is a History of COSI exhibit.

The building also includes three large galleries for traveling exhibits and special event hosting, a Dive Theater in Ocean, the Galaxy Theater in Gallery 3 (its name a remnant of when Gallery 3 was once the Space exhibit), the Gadgets Stage, the Atomic Cafe, the Science2Go! retail store, and five meeting rooms utilizing refurbished areas within the former Central High School, which the new COSI location was built around.

=== COSI Science Festival ===
On May 1–4, 2019, COSI, joined by Battelle, NASA, businesses, organizations, universities, and STEM leaders, hosted over one hundred community events showcasing science across Central Ohio as part of the inaugural COSI Science Festival. The 2019 COSI Science Festival was among the largest science events in Ohio history and included four days of events at central Ohio businesses, community centers, libraries, schools, and more. As part of the COSI Science Festival, COSI, Battelle, NASA, and other Central Ohio STEM leaders formed an unprecedented partnership that impacted 40000 people.

In May 2020, due to the COVID-19 pandemic, an all-digital COSI Science Festival garnered 118,990 total online views of 39 separate virtual science events.

In 2021, the COSI Science Festival remained virtual, reaching over 100000 learners.

In 2022, the festival returned to a primarily in-person model.

2023 saw record breaking attendance with over 11000 visitors to the community event portion of the festival, and another 33000 attending the Big Science Celebration on the final day of the four day festival. After an extensive evaluation, the 91% Big Science Celebration attendees said the Big Science Celebration had a positive impact or reinforced their existing opinions of STEM, and the majority said it helped broaden their awareness of STEM jobs and career options.

The COSI Science Festival is the largest STEAM event in Ohio, and one of the largest in the Midwest. The sixth COSI Science Festival was held May 1 - 4, 2024.

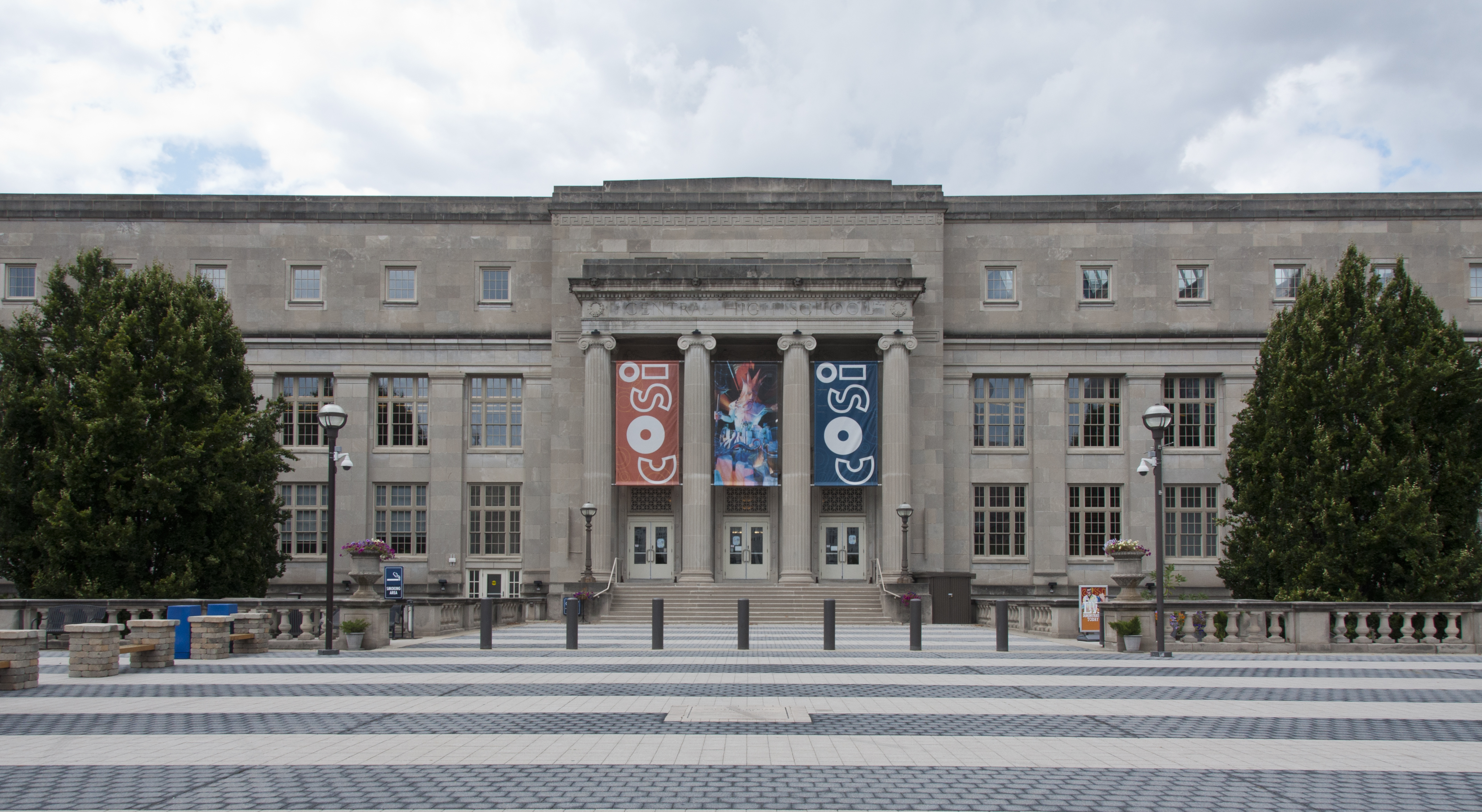
The museum's east portion was formerly Central High School

== History ==
COSI opened on March 29, 1964, as a venture of the Franklin County Historical Society. COSI is a founding member of the Science Museum Exhibit Collaborative (SMEC) and a long-standing member of the Association of Science-Technology Centers (ASTC).

From its 1964 opening, COSI was housed in Memorial Hall, a historic Columbus landmark constructed in 1906. COSI closed at the Memorial Hall location on East Broad Street on September 6, 1999, and re-opened two months later on November 6, 1999, at its new location on the Scioto riverfront on West Broad Street in downtown Columbus. The 320000 square foot facility was designed by Japanese architect Arata Isozaki, who designed an elliptical, geometric, "blimp" shaped structure composed of 159 curved concrete panels. The museum is designed to appear progressively futuristic from the neighborhood of Franklinton, while from downtown Columbus it uses the exterior of the original Central High School to blend into the city.

In 1972, COSI originated the Camp-In overnight program for Girl Scouts and Boy Scouts – a concept now commonplace in museums nationwide. Since 1964, COSI has engaged with nearly 30 million unique visitors through on-site and outreach programs.

COSI's Holiday Science of the Season Celebration annually from the day before Thanksgiving to New Year's Eve.

Shortly after the move to the riverfront, the museum experienced a shortfall of funds. With an initial construction budget of over $210 million, high maintenance costs of the new facility, "six-figure" utility bills, and "lower-than-expected" ticket sales, COSI's reliance on admission revenue proved an unsuitable long term plan. In 2004, the museum spearheaded an effort to assess a property tax levy, chaired by former NASA astronaut John Glenn. The levy would have imposed a property tax on residents of Franklin County, who would receive free admission in return. The levy failed. As a result, the south wing of COSI's "blimp" structure was closed.

As part of the reconfiguration of the museum following the loss of the levy in 2004, COSI opened only five days per week instead of seven. Many of the museum's exhibits were announced to close permanently, along with the closure of half of the building (though many have re-opened in stages in the years since). Two of the original exhibit areas were closed permanently (called i|o and SimZone, the spaces they formerly occupied are now Gallery 1 and Energy Explorers, respectively).

Closures from 2004 that have since been reversed include Space (relocated to Level 1 in 2005, then to the Mezzanine in 2012), the original Gallery 1 (space reused as WOSU@COSI in September 2006), Adventure (re-opened as an additional-charge experience in September 2010), CityView (still off-limits to the public; now available for special events), and the Planetarium (re-opened in November 2014 as the final piece of the building to come back online).

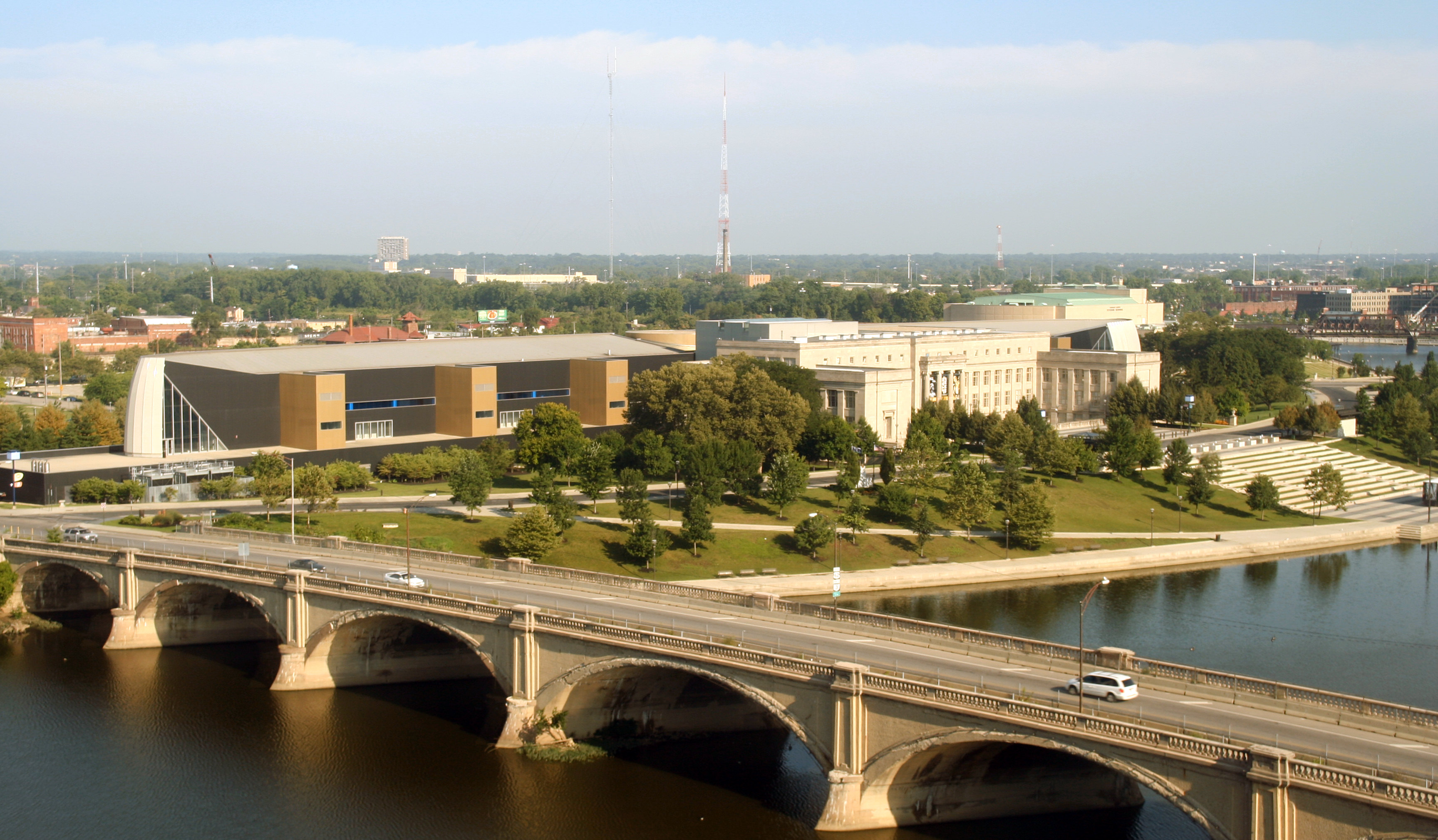
COSI from across the Scioto River

During the spring and summer of 2005, COSI hosted the blockbuster traveling exhibition "Titanic: The Artifact Exhibition" and saw record attendance (prompting the return of the exhibit in 2010). In the summer of 2006, COSI hosted another large exhibit: "Star Wars: Where Science Meets Imagination", produced by the Museum of Science, Boston.

In April 2006, Dr. David Chesebrough, former president and CEO of the Buffalo Museum of Science, became COSI's new president and CEO. He replaced former NASA astronaut Kathryn D. Sullivan, who became COSI science advisor on a volunteer basis while serving as the Director of Ohio State University's Battelle Center for Mathematics and Science Education Policy.

Since then, COSI has integrated additional-cost traveling exhibits as part of its funding model. The museum has hosted EINSTEIN, An Exhibition on the Man and his Science (2007), Gregor Mendel: Planting the Seeds of Genetics (2007), CSI: The Experience (2008), Geckos: From Tail to Toepads (2011), Dinosaurs: Explore. Escape. Survive. (2011) (2011), RACE: Are We So Different? (2012), WATER (2012), LEGO Castle Adventure (2012), BODYWORLDS and The Brain (2012), MindBender Mansion and Amazing Mazes (2013), MythBusters: The Explosive Exhibition (2013), and Sherlock Holmes: The Exhibition (2014). COSI also developed its own traveling exhibit, Lost Egypt: Ancient Secrets, Modern Science (2009) in cooperation with the Science Museum Exhibit Collaborative, built by the Science Museum of Minnesota.

In January 2016, Dr. Chesebrough announced that he planned to retire at the end of 2016. On November 10, 2016, the COSI board of trustees announced the selection of Dr. Frederic Bertley as COSI Columbus' new president and CEO, effective January 1, 2017.

On August 23, 2016, the Capitol South Community Redevelopment Corp. announced the approval of a $37 million plan to replace the 600-spot parking lots on COSI's west side with an underground parking garage topped with an 8-acre green space and programmatic park as a complement to the larger Scioto Peninsula green space along the Scioto River. The construction project is expected to be completed in spring 2018.

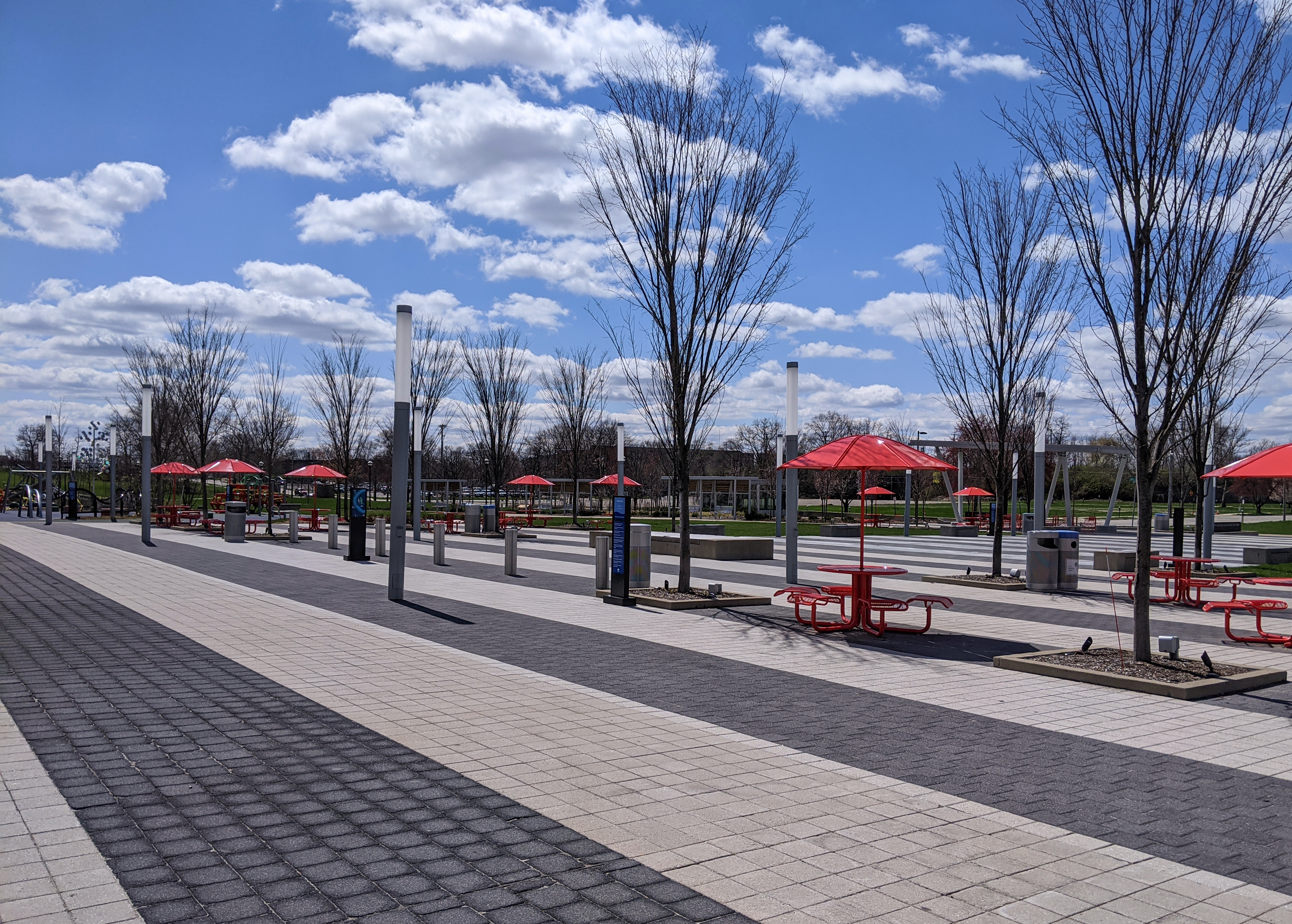
A park by COSI, Dorrian Green, was built in 2018

On September 16, 2016, COSI announced a partnership between the city of Columbus and the American Museum of Natural History (AMNH) in New York City to build a $5 million permanent Dinosaur Exhibition Gallery and a dedicated AMNH Traveling Exhibition Gallery replacing the WOSU and Adventure exhibits. The WOSU exhibit has since relocated; however, the Adventure exhibition closed permanently on January 1, 2017.

== See also ==
- Imagination Station, formerly COSI Toledo, formerly affiliated with COSI Columbus
- List of museums in Ohio
- List of science centers
