= Remembrance Park (Columbus, Ohio) =

Park in Columbus, Ohio, U.S.

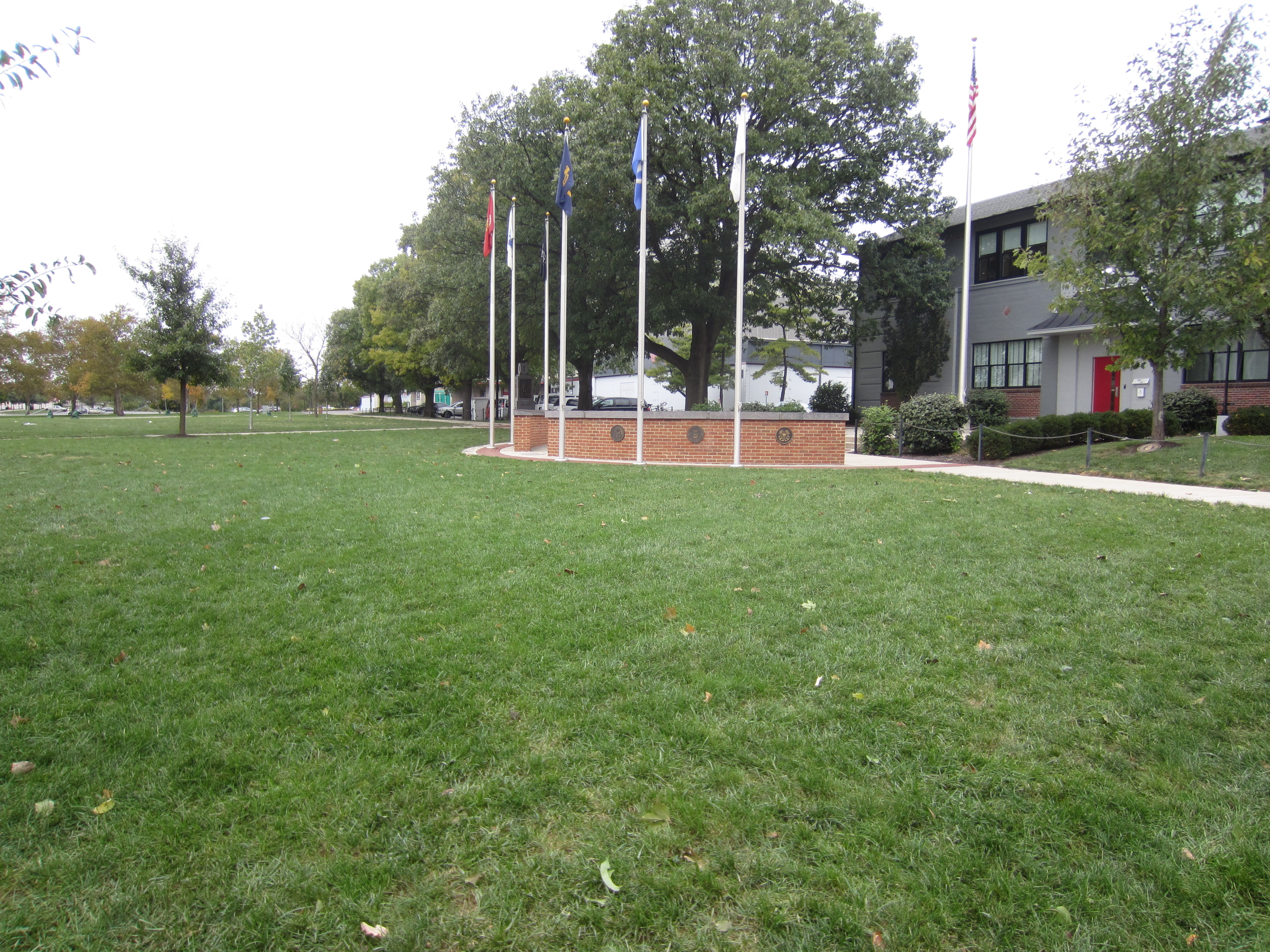
- Flags representing the different US Military branches at the park
- Interactive map of Remembrance Park
- Location: Columbus, Ohio
- Coordinates: 40°00′16″N 83°01′06″W
- Opened: 2011
- Owner: Ohio State University

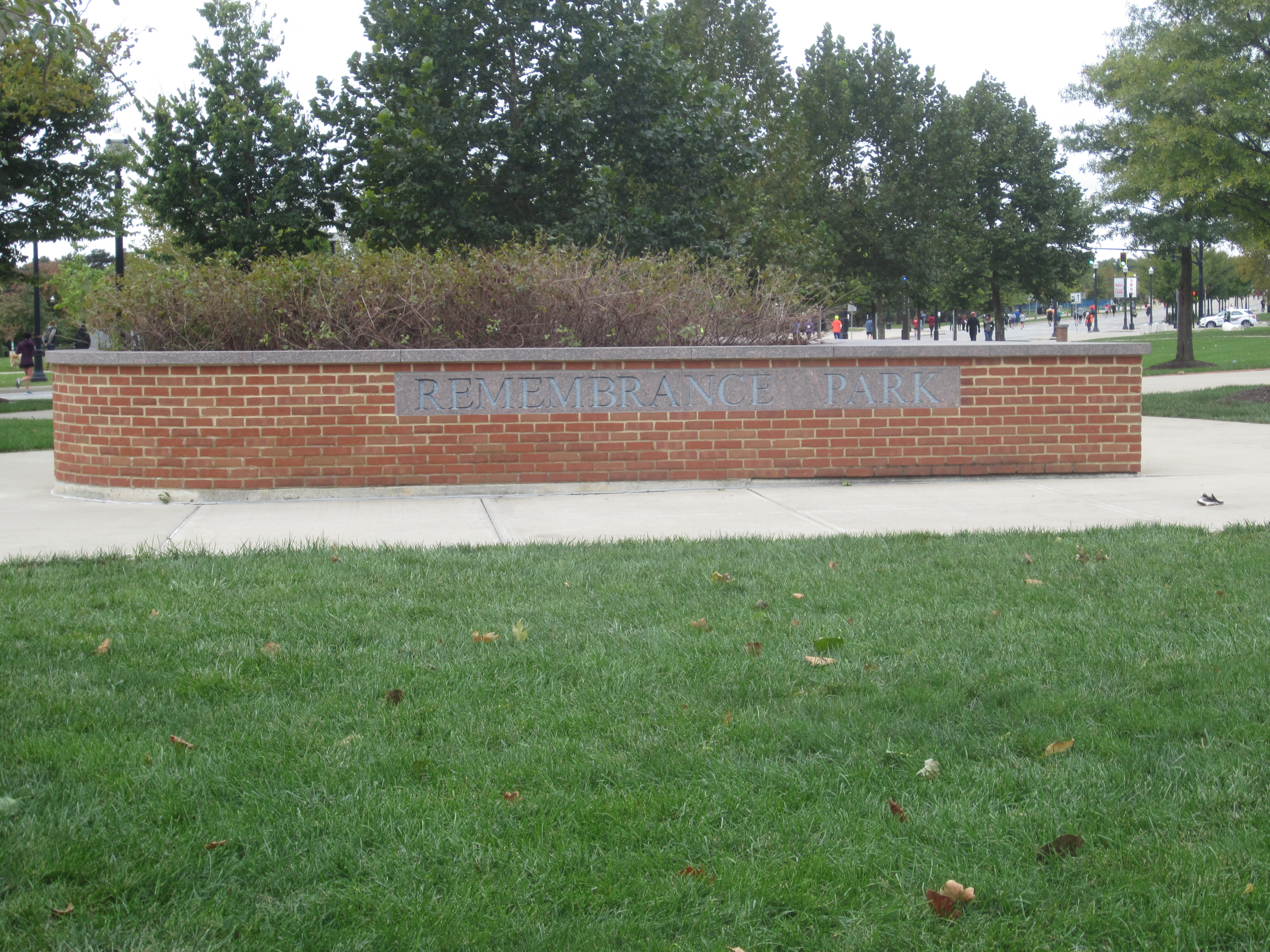
Park signage, 2018

Remembrance Park is a park on the Ohio State University campus in Columbus, Ohio, United States. The public memorial commemorates veteran alumni. The park was officially dedicated in 2011.

== See also ==
- List of parks in Columbus, Ohio
