= Frederic Bertley =

Canadian immunologist and museum president

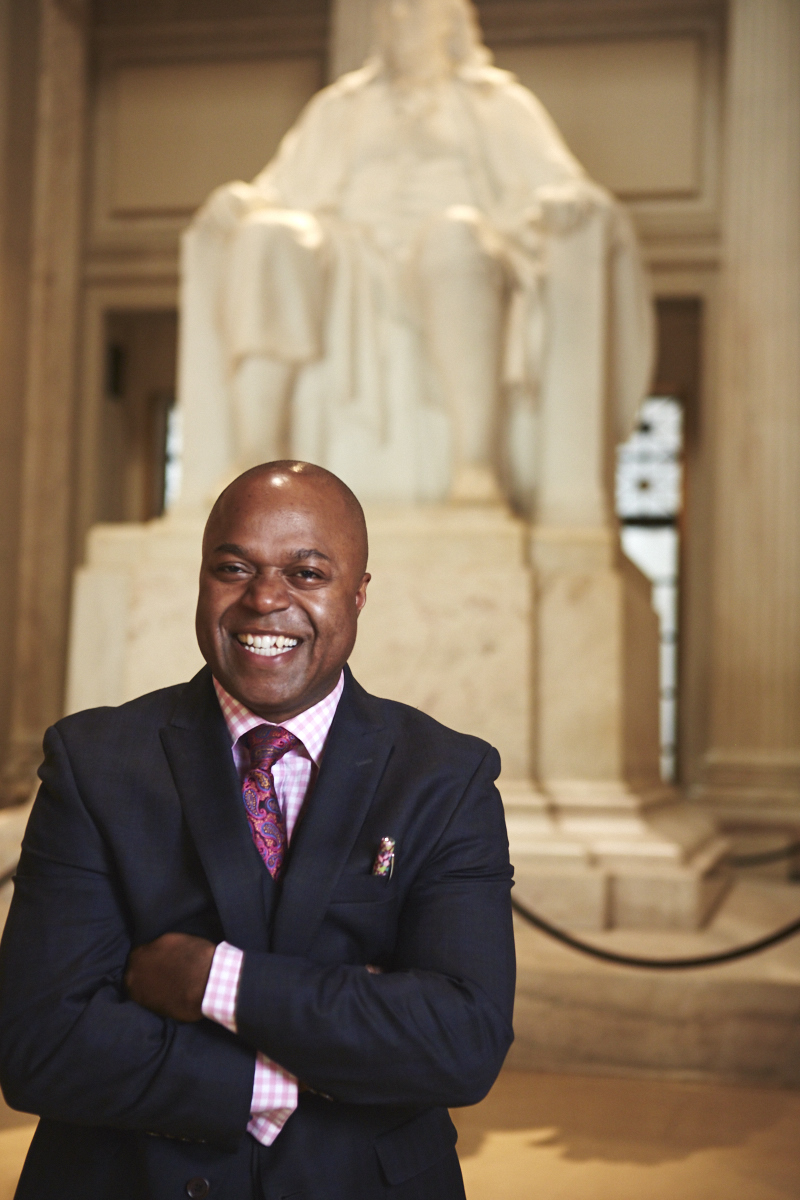
- Frederic Bertley in front of the Benjamin Franklin National Memorial at the Franklin Institute, 2016
- Born: Montreal, Quebec, Canada
- Education: McGill University; Harvard Medical School
- Scientific career
- Fields: Immunology, and Education

Frederic Bertley is a Canadian immunologist and science educator. He is currently the President & CEO of COSI (Center of Science and Industry), a science museum in Columbus, Ohio. Prior to COSI, Bertley worked as Senior Vice President for Science and Education at The Franklin Institute in Philadelphia.

== Career ==
Bertley earned a bachelor's degree with a focus in physiology, mathematics, and the history of science in 1994 and a Ph.D. in immunology in 1999, both from McGill University. In 2003, he went on to receive his post-doctoral fellowship at Harvard Medical School.

After his postdoctoral fellowship, Bertley worked as a scientist at Millennium Pharmaceuticals before joining WilmerHale LLP as a technology specialist in 2004, In 2008 he became the vice president of the Center for Innovation in Science Learning at the Franklin Institute. While at the Franklin institute he created the Color of Science Program, which is a Diversity & Equity initiative aimed towards bringing attention to women and people of color in STEM In late 2016, Bertley left the Franklin institute to become the president and CEO of COSI. Over the last 6 years (2020–2025), COSI has won the USA Today Readers Choice Award for Best Science Museum.

== Recognition ==
- Honorary Doctorate Degree in public service from Otterbein University, 2018
- George Washington Carver Award, Temple University/The Academy of Natural Sciences, 2017
- Minority Business Leader of the Year Award Philadelphia Business Journal, 2014
- Mid-Atlantic Regional Emmy For The Franklin Institute Awards Program: Declaration of Progress: Mid-Atlantic Chapter of the National Academy of Television and Science, 2013
- Dell Inspire 100 World Changers, 2012
- 40 Under 40 Philadelphia Business Journal, 2010
