= Columbus Park of Roses =

Park and rose garden in Columbus, Ohio, U.S.

- Whetstone Park of Roses
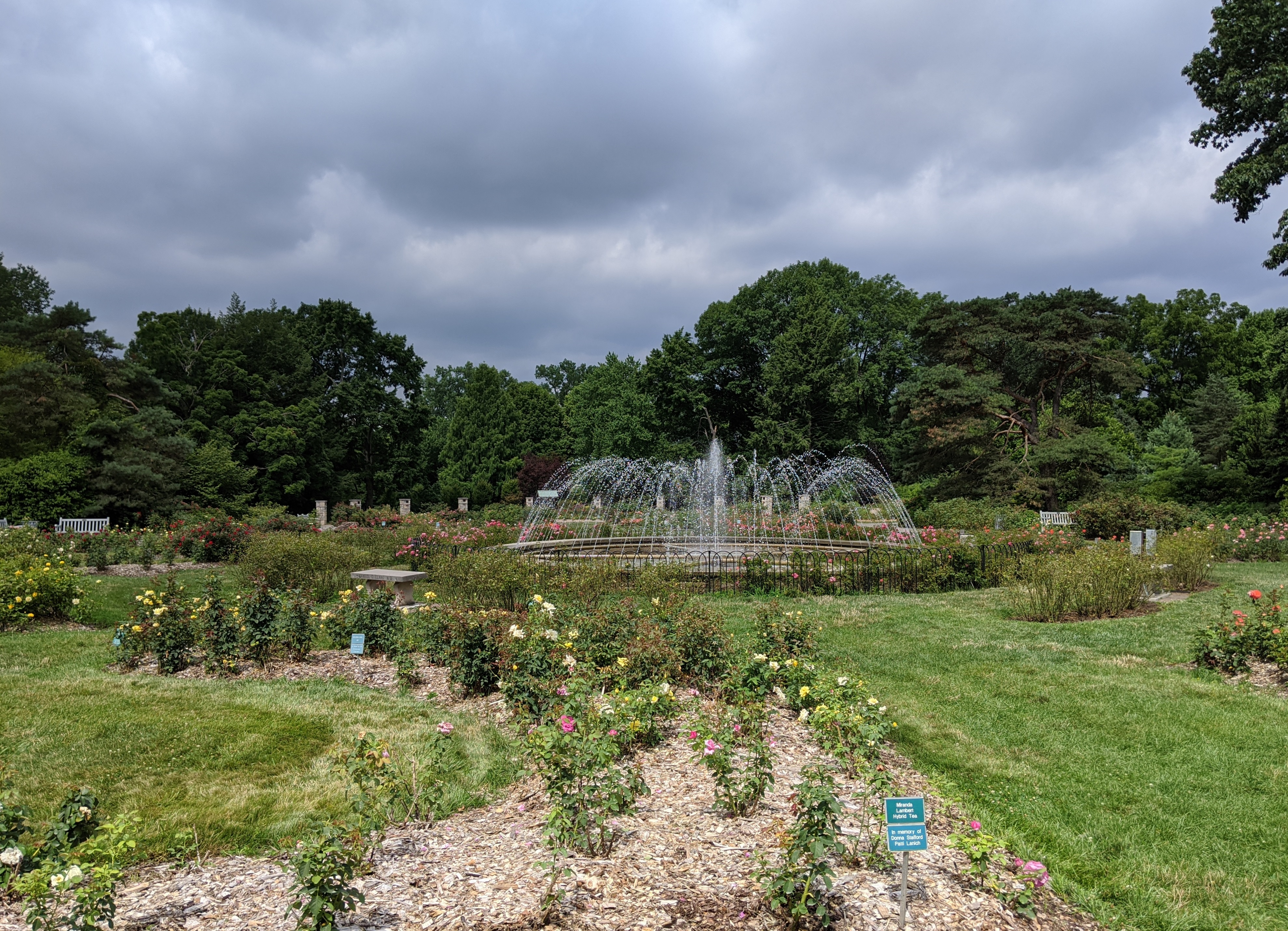
- The park's Formal Rose Garden
- Interactive map of the park
- Location: 3923 North High Street, Columbus, Ohio
- Coordinates: 40°02′38″N 83°01′31″W
- Area: 13 acres (5.3 ha)
- Designer: Ray Dietz, Eugene Rosebrook, George Tobey
- Administrator: Columbus Recreation and Parks Department
- Plants: 11,000 roses of 350 varieties
- Parking: Surface lot
- Public transit: 2, 102

The Columbus Park of Roses, also known as the Whetstone Park of Roses, is a public park and rose garden in Columbus, Ohio. The 13-acre (5.3 ha) park is located within the city's larger Whetstone Park in the Clintonville neighborhood. The free public park is operated by the Columbus Recreation and Parks Department.

The Park of Roses was established in 1952, following ideas for a city hall rose garden in 1946. The park was landscaped and planted in 1952 and 1953, opening in June 1953. The American Rose Society held its headquarters at the park beginning in 1952. The Park of Roses gradually expanded over the following decades, including opening its Heritage Garden in 1985.

== Attributes ==
The Columbus Park of Roses is a 13-acre (5.3 ha) park and garden, one of the largest public rose gardens in the country. The park has about 11,000 rose specimens and 350 varieties.

The park is located within the 148-acre (60 ha) Whetstone Park; both are operated by the Columbus Recreation and Parks Department. The park is open to the public for free, from 7 a.m. to dusk year-round.

In addition to the floral displays and gardens, the park includes picnic spaces, a shelterhouse that is reservable for parties and weddings, a walking trail, and forests.

The park has a small outdoor theater and gazebo. The gazebo was built in 1878 at the Fort Hayes military reservation, and was restored and reinstalled in the Park of Roses in 1975. The Civitan Club of North Columbus hosts annual concerts throughout summer here, and was one of several organizations to procure and restore the gazebo.

Many of the park's features have been donated, including its sundial (in 1954), a plaque with a poem inscribed, park benches, and rose bushes.

=== Gardens ===
Garden areas include:

- The Formal Rose Garden — symmetrical rose beds, each planted with a single variety
- The Heritage Rose Garden — pre-1867 rose cultivars, many of which are predecessors of modern roses
- The Perennial Garden — about 100 varieties of perennials, bulbs, shrubs, and trees
- The Herb Garden — about 100 plant varieties grouped by use, fragrance, or pollinator qualities
- The Backyard Garden — low-maintenance plants and trees intended to give visitors ideas for home gardens
- The Arboretum — spread throughout the park, with approximately 138 tree and shrub varieties

==== Rose gardens ====
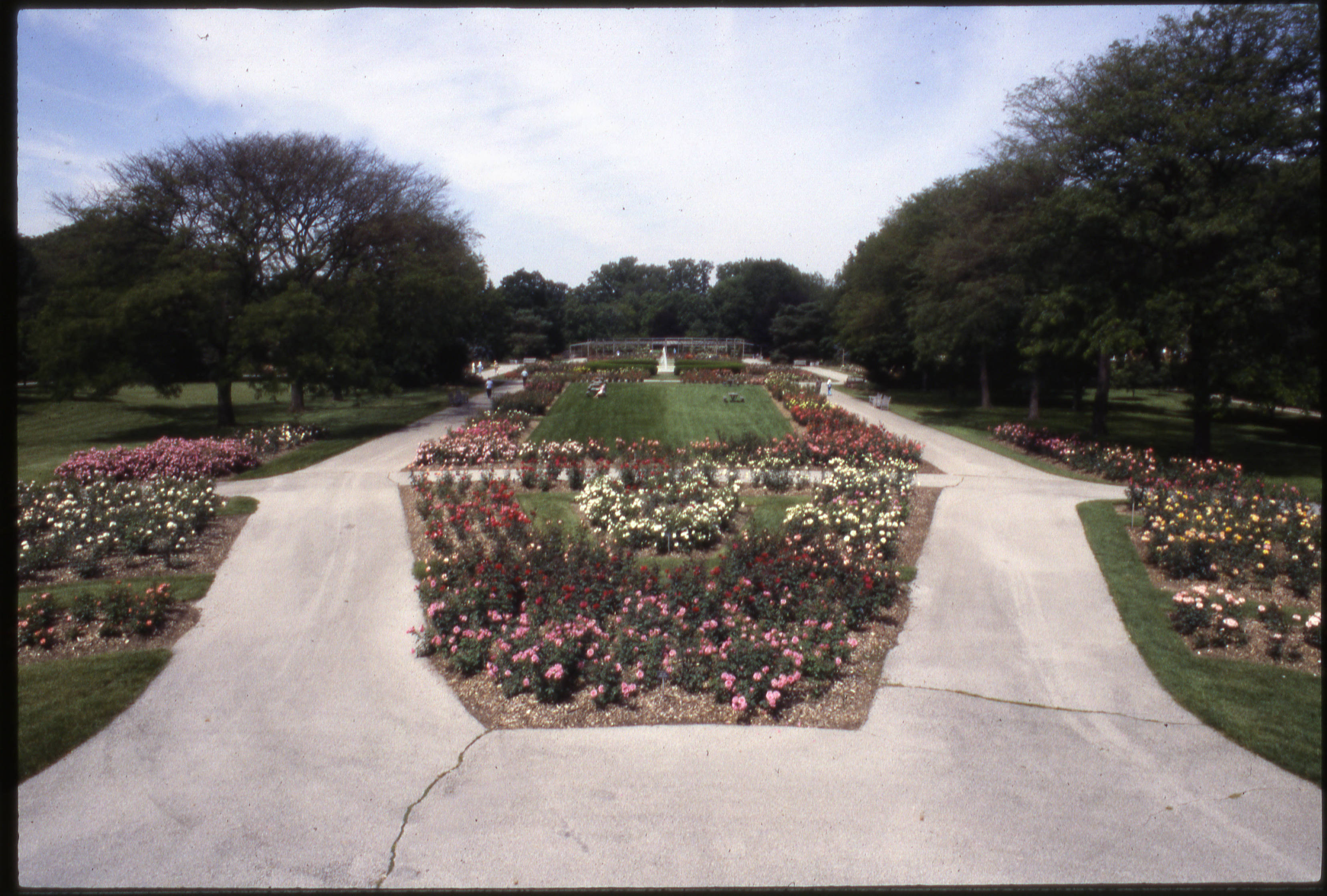
View of the Formal Rose Garden, 1992

The Formal Rose Garden was the first area planted, in 1953. It was designed as a formal Italian garden, with symmetrical hedges. Each rose bed is planted with a single variety, and no other flowers, trees, or shrubs. The garden covers 7 of the park's 13 acres, and has about 11,000 varieties: floribunda, grandiflora, hybrid tea, climber and shrub roses. The garden's eastern end features a decorative observation tower, added to the garden in the 1980s. Its center features a fountain, installed in 1957 and renovated in 2012. The garden's western stone and iron fence entrance was completed in 2017.

The Heritage Rose Garden features roses cultivated before 1867, the date accepted for the beginning of modern roses. The garden was dedicated in 1986. Roses include centifolias, damasks, gallicas, and rugosas.

==== Other plantings ====
The Perennial Garden, south of the Formal Rose Garden, has eight large beds and about 100 varieties of perennial plants, bulbs, trees, and shrubs. Its plantings change throughout the year, given Ohio's long growing season from March to November. The garden was part of the park's original landscape plan, but was only completed in the early 1970s. The Northview Buckeye Garden Club has planned and maintained it since 1997.

The Herb Garden, just east of the Perennial Garden, has about 100 herbs and functional plants. There are nine thematic beds - culinary, tea, medicinal, dye, edible flowers, fragrance, rose, pollinator, and Native American. The Herb Garden was created in 1976, after severe winters damaged many of the roses originally planted here. The Columbus Horticultural Society has planned and maintained the garden since its opening.

The Backyard Garden, in the northwest corner of the park, has a wide variety of bulbs, perennials, shrubs, and ornamental trees, intended to give guests ideas for their own gardens. The garden was developed from 2007 to 2009, and is the first public Earth-Kind Garden outside the American South. It was originally planned to test commercially available roses without the use of fertilizers, pesticides, irrigation, or other special maintenance, though other plantings have been added, with conservation and ease of care in mind.

The Arboretum is an extensive collection of trees, one of the park's year-round features. It has approximately 138 tree and shrub varieties. The Arboretum provides a natural habitat for native birds of Ohio, migratory birds, pollinators, and insects.

Interactive map of the park's five gardens and other features

== History ==
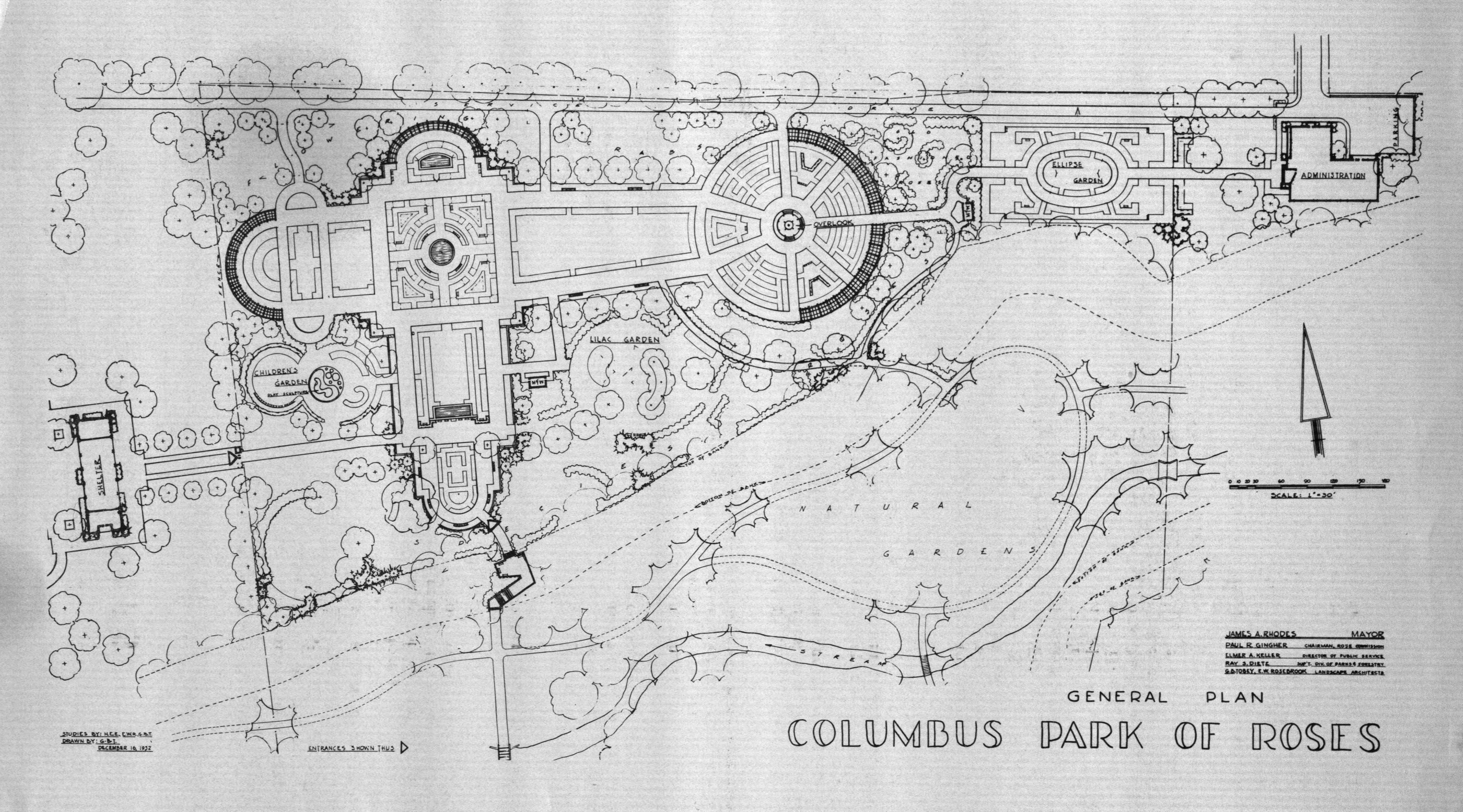
Early plan for the garden, 1952

Columbus City Council approved the purchase of 106 acres of the E. A. Fuller Farm that was to become Whetstone Park in 1944. The land was used for victory gardens during World War II and opened as a city park in 1950.

Around 1946, ideas came up for a rose garden at Columbus City Hall. The idea never became a reality, but the movement toward a rose park began. In 1951 members of the Columbus Rose Club and the Central Ohio Rose Society formed a committee to create the park, which was established April 19, 1952. At this time, the Columbus Rose Commission, a committee of eleven members, began advising the parks department regarding the Park of Roses.

The design was led by the department's superintendent Ray S. Dietz and landscape architects Eugene A. Rosebrook, and George B. Tobey, Jr. and occupied 13.5 acres of Whetstone Park, which at the time was the largest park in Columbus at 100 acres. The garden was designed be a self-supporting, fenced-in space with durable structures and wide enough pathways for landscaping machinery. The Park of Roses was to have 50,000 roses, with varieties that would appeal to rosarians and the public. The four gardens in the plan allowed enough size and variety to prompt return visits.

2,000 hybrid teas were planted in autumn 1952, though most planting was in late March to April 1953. The park opened to the public on June 6, 1953, following all the paths and gardens laid out, and enclosed by a fence. At this time, the garden had 20,000 plants. The park hosted the National Convention of the American Rose Society and was officially dedicated on September 12 during the event. By 1956, the park had 32,000 plants and 425 varieties. At this time, it had a flowering crab apple collection, with proposed lilac and children's gardens to be installed.

In 1952, the American Rose Society headquarters moved from Hartford, Connecticut to Columbus. The new headquarters included the largest rose library in the world.

The Heritage Garden was opened in 1985. The Park of Roses Foundation was created in February 1986 to manage donations to the park, after harsh winters in the mid-1970s killed almost half its bushes.

The park was not a part of AmeriFlora '92, an international floral show in Columbus in 1992. The Park of Roses and Ohio State Fair were considered reasons why the show was unsuccessful, as the park is free and the fair charged $5 admission.

== See also ==
- List of parks in Columbus, Ohio
