= Bicentennial Park (Columbus, Ohio) =

Park in Columbus, Ohio, U.S.

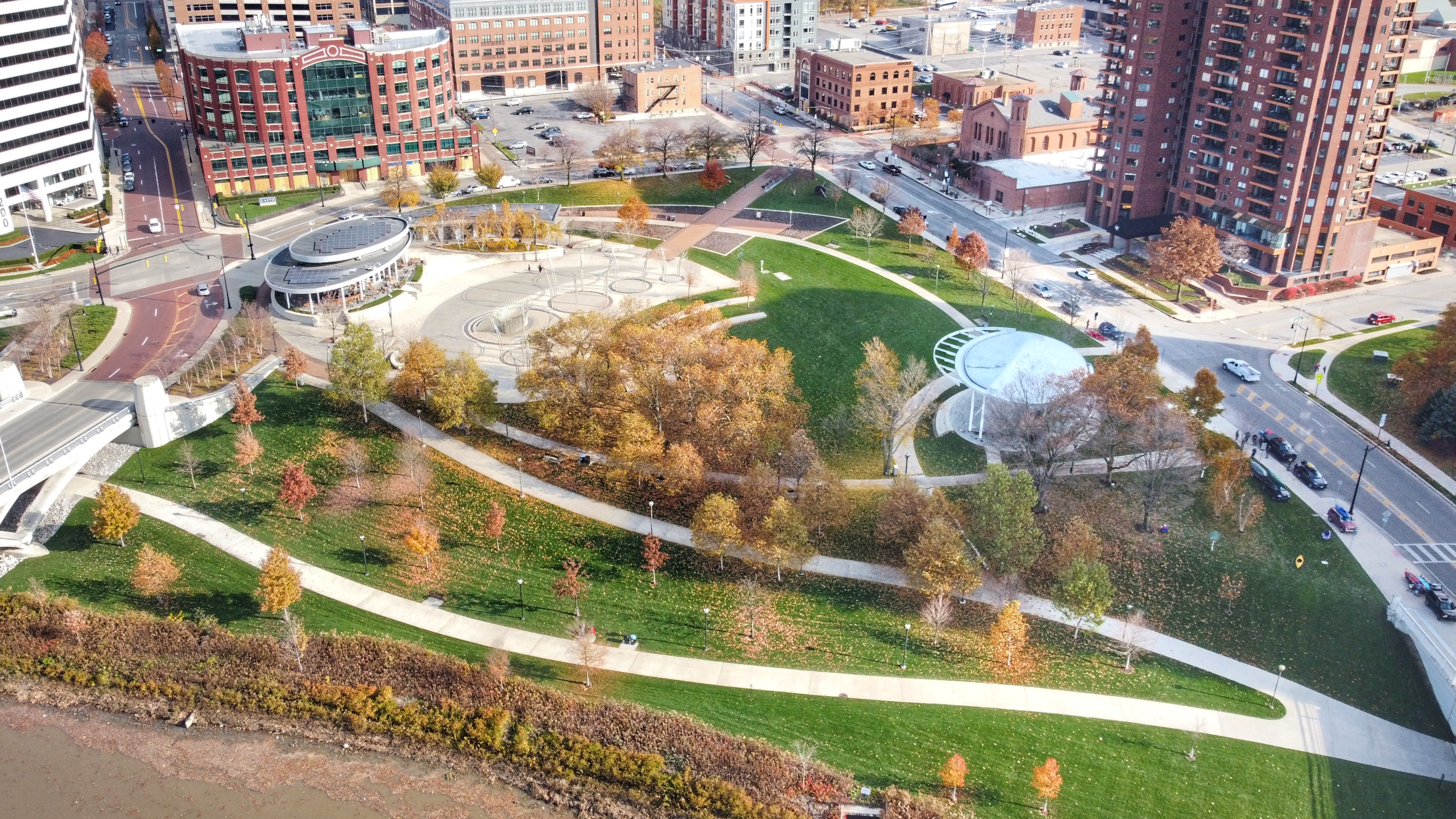
- Aerial view of the park in autumn
- Interactive map of Bicentennial Park
- Location: 233 Civic Center Drive, Columbus, Ohio, United States
- Coordinates: 39°57′23″N 83°00′15″W
- Area: 4.66 acres (1.89 ha)
- Opened: 1976
- Administrator: Columbus Recreation and Parks Department
- Public transit: 3, 6, 9 CoGo
- Website: Official website

John W. Galbreath Bicentennial Park is a 4.66-acre (1.89 ha) park in downtown Columbus, Ohio, United States, located at 233 Civic Center Drive. The park features a fountain, a park restaurant and a performance pavilion.

Bicentennial Park was established in 1976, on the United States' 200th anniversary. It was dedicated to John W. Galbreath, an Ohio philanthropist, builder, Kentucky Derby breeder and owner of the Pittsburgh Pirates from 1945 to 1985.

== Features ==
The Scioto Mile Fountain presents unique lighting and fog effects, it is interactive and accessible to people of all ages.

The park also features Milestone 229, a restaurant and dining terrace that offers a panoramic view of the Scioto Mile and the downtown Columbus skyline, and it features rooftop solar panels to help power both the restaurant and the fountain. The restaurant is open daily for lunch and dinner.

The Performing Arts Pavilion is a permanent stage that hosts events such as dance recitals and shows, as well as other community events, presented by the Recreation and Parks Department.

== See also ==
- List of parks in Columbus, Ohio
