= Columbus Recreation and Parks Department =

Parks and recreation department of Columbus, Ohio

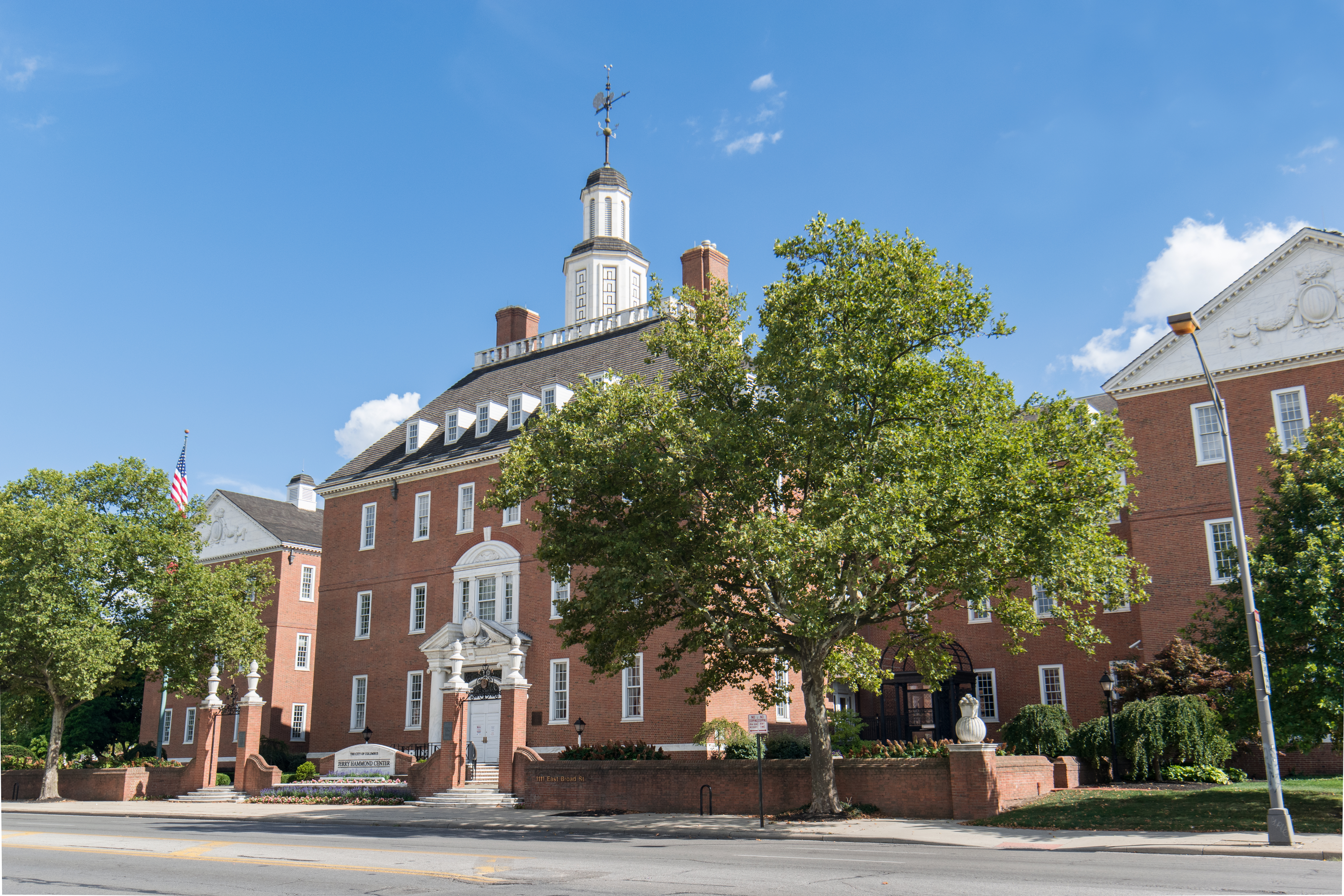
- The Jerry Hammond Center, the department headquarters

Department overview
- Formed: January 2, 1972
- Preceding agencies: City Recreation Department; Division of Forestry and Parks
- Headquarters: 1111 E. Broad Street, Columbus, Ohio; 39°57′54″N 82°58′15″W
- Department executives: Bernita Reese, Director; Steve Hiland, Deputy Director; Kenton Curtis, Deputy Director; Craig Murphy, Deputy Director; Jason Nicholson, Assistant Director; Dawn Turnage, Assistant Director; Nicole Smith, HR Director
- Website: columbusrecparks.com

The Columbus Recreation and Parks Department manages parks, recreational facilities, and grounds in Columbus, Ohio. The department oversees 370 parks on about 13,500 acres (5,500 ha). The department also maintains 29 community centers, five athletic complexes, six golf courses, 120 miles (190 km) of trails, five splash pads and interactive fountains, eight pools, an indoor aquatic center, 14 nature preserves, three reservoirs, five dog parks, and a skate park.

== History ==
=== Early history ===
In 1839, Columbus created its first park, five years after becoming a city. The park, Livingston Park, was made into an official public park in 1885. In 1851, Dr. Lincoln Goodale donated 40 acres to the City of Columbus for use as a park. That site became Goodale Park. In 1867, the city acquired property for what would become Schiller Park in what is now German Village.

In 1895, the Franklin Park Conservatory opened to the public and was owned and operated by the department until 1989.

In 1904, the city formed an 18-member park commission and maintained playgrounds in four city parks. The City Recreation Department was founded on July 15, 1910, and opened up five recreation centers in the following two years. In 1920, the first municipal golf course was established and a day camp in 1927. The Maryland Pool was built by The Columbus Dispatch in 1929, later gifting it to the city to make it the city's first pool.

The Recreation Department took over management of the Columbus Zoo and Aquarium in 1951, but later gave up ownership to the Zoological Park Association, Inc., a non-profit organization, in 1970. The city continued providing funds from the city's general fund, however, until 1986.

On June 6, 1953 the Columbus Park of Roses opened to the public, following all the paths and gardens laid out, and enclosed by a fence. At this time, the garden had 20,000 plants. The park utilized 13.5 acres (5.5 ha), though with 35 total acres including woodlands and a natural ravine of the surrounding Whetstone Park, which at the time was the largest in Columbus with 100 acres (40 ha).

=== Current department, 1972–present ===
In 1972, voters approved the merger of the Recreation Department with the Division of Parks and Forestry to form the current department to better coordinate the management and planning of the parks. Having begun his term as superintendent of the Recreation Department, Melvin Dodge was named the department's director and began the development of the Olentangy Riverfront to create a park with a floating bandshell, amphitheatre, and bike trails. During his tenure, he helped to create Columbus's current park system, including recreation centers and riverfront parks. He also saw the Columbus Zoo grow into a renowned zoo. Dodge retired in 1985, and was succeeded by James W. Barney as director.

In 2019, Bernita Reese became director of the department, the first Black woman in the position.

== Governance ==
The Columbus Recreation and Parks Department has a nine-member commission who are appointed by the mayor that establishes the policy direction of the park. A director oversees programs management, administration, and facilities management of the department.

=== Columbus Recreation Department Superintendents ===
- Edgar S. Martin, 1910-1912
- R.S. Wambold, 1912-1915
- A.W. Raymond, 1916-1929
- Herman L. Wirthwein, 1929-1932
- Charles E. Seddon, 1932-1939
- Jack Cannon, 1940-1942
- Rodney Ross, 1943
- Nicholas J. Barrack, 1944-1966
- Melvin Dodge, 1967-1972

=== Columbus Recreation and Parks Department Directors ===
- Melvin Dodge, 1972-1987
- James W. Barney, 1987-1992
- Gary N Fenton, 1993-2000
- Wayne A. Roberts, 2000-2006
- Alan McKnight, 2007-2015
- Tony Collins, 2015-2019
- Bernita Reese, 2019–present

== See also ==
- Government of Columbus, Ohio
- List of parks in Columbus, Ohio
