= Ohayocon =

Annual anime convention in Columbus, Ohio, U.S.

Coordinates: 39.960031°N 82.997808°W

- Status: Active
- Genre: Anime, Manga, Video Gaming
- Venue: The Plaza Hotel Columbus at Capitol Square
- Location: Columbus, Ohio
- Country: United States
- Inaugurated: 2001
- Attendance: 4,000 paid (est.) in 2024
- Organizer: Cultural Exchange Society (CES)
- Website: https://ohayocon.online/

Ohayocon is a three-day anime convention held during January/February at the The Plaza Hotel Columbus at Capitol Square in Columbus, Ohio. Ohayocon's name is derived from the similarity between "Ohio", the convention's location, and Ohayou (おはよう), which means "good morning" in Japanese.

== Programming ==
The convention typically offers an anime music contest, an artists' alley, concerts, costume contests, a dealers' room, a formal ball, a masquerade, musical events, panel discussions, a rave, table-top games, tournaments, video gaming, and workshops.

== History ==
=== 2001-2023 ===
In 2007, the Midwest premiere of Robotech: The Shadow Chronicles occurred at the Arena Grand Theatre during Ohayocon. In 2010, crowding was a problem during the rave due to space issues. The convention shared the Columbus Convention Center with other events and only used about one-fourth of the available space. The convention's dance was moved to the convention center ballroom in 2012 to alleviate crowding issues. Ohayocon began using wristbands instead of badges to control unpaid attendance in 2014. During Ohayocon 2015, a transgender teen disappeared during the rave on Saturday night. The teen was attempting to run away and was later found safe in downtown Columbus on Tuesday. The Columbus Convention Center was undergoing construction during Ohayocon 2017, and the convention continued to use wristbands instead of badges.

Ohayocon 2021 was cancelled due to the COVID-19 pandemic, but a virtual event was held in its place. The 2022 convention had an attendance cap of 17,000 and events like the dance were not held. Ohayocon also had COVID-19 policies that included masks and testing or vaccination. The dance and formal ball returned in 2023. Ohayocon continued to have COVID-19 protocols that included masks and testing or vaccination.

=== Controversy and relocation 2024-present ===
Significant numbers of the conventions leadership and volunteers did not participate in the 2024 convention. This was due to the firing of the conventions chair and head of marketing over a logo dispute, among other issues including finances. The convention contends at the time they were removed due to organizational changes surrounding the formation of the Cultural Exchange Society Inc. (CESI), which as of 2024, the formation of is still not complete (specifically the non-profit status.) The staff, as part of the Conventions of Ohio Volunteer Event Network (COVEN), attempted to negotiate unsuccessfully with CESI. Ohayocon announced new leadership prior to the 2025 event, along with the convention moving to the Dayton Convention Center. In January 2025, Ohayocon's owners sued Sekai Guild/Sekaicon, a new convention formed by former staff of Ohayocon. They accused the former staff of stealing convention assets and information.

=== Event history ===
Dates	Location	Atten.	Guests
January 26–28, 2001	Sheraton Airport Hotel; Cleveland, Ohio	800	Michael Brady, Izzy Burger, Jessica Calvello, Juliet Cesario, Robert DeJesus, Tiffany Grant, Jei Fubler Harvey, Neil Nadelman, Jonathan Osborne, Jan Scott-Frazier, Scott Simpson, Kazuko Tadano, Brett Weaver, and Greg Wicker.
January 11–13, 2002	Holiday Inn Cleveland-South; Independence, Ohio	1,200	Rodney "Largo" Caston, Tiffany Grant, Jonathan Osborne, Debora Rabbai, Jan Scott-Frazier.
January 10–12, 2003	Hilton Columbus; Columbus, Ohio	2,061	Steve Bennett, Kei Blue, Keith Burgess, Robert DeJesus, Brad DeMoss, Fred Gallagher, Tiffany Grant, Amy Howard-Wilson, Shimpei Itoh, Vic Mignogna, Yad-Ming Mui, Stephanie Nadolny, Dominic Nguyen, Mio Odagi, Jonathan Osborne, Chris Patton, Debora Rabbai, Monica Rial, Jan Scott-Frazier, Doug Smith, Jeff Thompson, and Toshifumi Yoshida.
January 23–25, 2004	Hyatt Regency Columbus; Columbus, Ohio	3,042	Greg Ayres, Steve Bennett, Blood, Keith Burgess, Austell "DJ Asu" Callwood, Richard Ian Cox, Robert DeJesus, Brad DeMoss, Tiffany Grant, Jaxon Lee, Scott McNeil, Jillian Michaels, Yad-Ming Mui, Monica Rial, Jan Scott-Frazier, Jeff Thompson, David L. Williams, Amanda Winn-Lee, and Toshifumi Yoshida.
January 14–16, 2005	Hyatt Regency Columbus; Columbus Convention Center; Columbus, Ohio	4,051	Greg Ayres, Steve Bennett, Keith Burgess, Steve Conte, Emily DeJesus, Robert DeJesus, Tiffany Grant, Bruce Lewis, Mike McFarland, Scott McNeil, Vic Mignogna, Monica Rial, Christopher Sabat, Jan Scott-Frazier, Michael Sinterniklaas, Doug Smith, Jeff Thompson, and David L. Williams.
January 6–8, 2006	Hyatt Regency Columbus; Columbus Convention Center; Columbus, Ohio	4,423	Greg Ayres, Laura Bailey, Johnny Yong Bosch, Emily DeJesus, Robert DeJesus, Michael Dobson, Tiffany Grant, Matt Greenfield, Mike McFarland, Scott McNeil, Dave Merrill, Shaindle Minuk, Peelander-Z, Monica Rial, Christopher Sabat, Jan Scott-Frazier, The Spoony Bards, Jeff Thompson, and Toshifumi Yoshida.
January 5–7, 2007	Hyatt Regency Columbus; Columbus Convention Center; Columbus, Ohio	6,240	Christopher Ayres, Greg Ayres, Chris Bevins, Emily DeJesus, Robert DeJesus, Caitlin Glass, Tiffany Grant, Matt Greenfield, Clarine Harp, Brittney Karbowski, Jaxon Lee, Bruce Lewis, Mike McFarland, Chris Patton, Monica Rial, Christopher Sabat, Jan Scott-Frazier, Rikki Simons, Doug Smith, The Spoony Bards, Amanda Winn-Lee, and Tavisha Wolfgarth-Simons.
January 4–6, 2008	Hyatt Regency Columbus; Columbus Convention Center; Columbus, Ohio	7,000 (est)	Christopher Ayres, Greg Ayres, Chris Bevins, Johnny Yong Bosch, Emily DeJesus, Robert DeJesus, Eyeshine, Tiffany Grant, Matt Greenfield, Clarine Harp, Brittney Karbowski, Jonathan Klein, Bruce Lewis, Mike McFarland, Randy Milholland, Monica Rial, Antimere Robinson, Christopher Sabat, Jan Scott-Frazier, Rikki Simons, Voices For, and Tavisha Wolfgarth-Simons.
January 30 – February 1, 2009	Hyatt Regency Columbus; Columbus Convention Center; Columbus, Ohio	8,093	Christopher Ayres, Greg Ayres, Emily DeJesus, Robert DeJesus, Aaron Dismuke, Caitlin Glass, Tiffany Grant, Matt Greenfield, Mohammad "Hawk" Haque, Jerry Jewell, Dave Lister, Mike McFarland, Vic Mignogna, Ananth Panagariya, Chris Patton, Antimere Robinson, Rikki Simons, Michael Sinterniklaas, J. Michael Tatum, Brett Weaver, David L. Williams, and Tavisha Wolfgarth-Simons.
January 29–31, 2010	Hyatt Regency Columbus; Greater Columbus Convention Center; Columbus, Ohio	10,120	Christopher Ayres, Greg Ayres, Jonathan Coulton, Robert DeJesus, Aaron Dismuke, Tiffany Grant, Matt Greenfield, Illich Guardiola, Carl Gustav Horn, Jerry Jewell, Bruce Lewis, Dave Lister, Jamie McGonnigal, Lisa Ortiz, Wendy Powell, Jan Scott-Frazier, Stephanie Sheh, Rikki Simons, Michael Sinterniklaas, Doug Smith, J. Michael Tatum, Richard Townsend, Shannon Townsend, Voices For, Tom Wayland, and Tavisha Wolfgarth-Simons.
January 28–30, 2011	Hyatt Regency Columbus; Greater Columbus Convention Center; Columbus, Ohio	11,000	Christopher Ayres, Greg Ayres, Chris Bevins, Kevin Bolk, Robert DeJesus, Kaja Foglio, Phil Foglio, Bruce Lewis, Mundee Lewis, Mike McFarland, Jamie McGonnigal, Carli Mosier, Brina Palencia, Rawly Pickens, Monica Rial, Christopher Sabat, Patrick Seitz, Rikki Simons, Doug Smith, and Tavisha Wolfgarth-Simons.
January 27–29, 2012	Hyatt Regency Columbus; Greater Columbus Convention Center; Columbus, Ohio	12,500	Christopher Ayres, Greg Ayres, Emily DeJesus, Robert DeJesus, Fred Gallagher, Ryan Gavigan, Todd Haberkorn, Mari Iijima, Trish Ledoux, The Pillowcases, Carrie Savage, Rikki Simons, Brad Swaile, SWEK, J. Michael Tatum, Amanda Winn-Lee, Tavisha Wolfgarth-Simons, Toshifumi Yoshida, and Steve Yun.
January 18–20, 2013	Hyatt Regency Columbus; Greater Columbus Convention Center; Columbus, Ohio		Christopher Ayres, Greg Ayres, Robert DeJesus, Brian Dobson, Junko Fujiyama, Fred Gallagher, Tiffany Grant, Matt Greenfield, Darrel Guilbeau, Kyle Hebert, Richard Horvitz, Kazha, Kevin Lillard, Dave Lister, Jamie McGonnigal, Jan Scott-Frazier, Rikki Simons, Spike Spencer, Amanda Winn-Lee, Tavisha Wolfgarth-Simons, and YTCracker.
January 24–26, 2014	Hyatt Regency Columbus; Greater Columbus Convention Center; Columbus, Ohio		Christopher Ayres, Greg Ayres, Tia Ballard, Jessica Calvello, Justin Cook, Emily DeJesus, Robert DeJesus, Illich Guardiola, Richard Horvitz, Jerry Jewell, Brittney Karbowski, Michele Knotz, Mike McFarland, Vic Mignogna, Lisa Ortiz, Rikki Simons, Ian Sinclair, Brad Swaile, J. Michael Tatum, and Tavisha Wolfgarth-Simons.
January 30 – February 1, 2015	Hyatt Regency Columbus; Greater Columbus Convention Center; Columbus, Ohio		Dino Andrade, Dr. Awkward, Christopher Ayres, Greg Ayres, Jessica Calvello, Emily DeJesus, Robert DeJesus, Jessie James Grelle, Greg Houser, Jerry Jewell, Michele Knotz, Bettina M. Kurkoski, Shin Kurokawa, Cynthia Martinez, David Matranga, Helen McCarthy, Carli Mosier, Rob Mungle, Nylon Pink, Project BECK, Xero Reynolds, Bill Rogers, Brad Swaile, and Greg Wicker.
January 15–17, 2016	Hyatt Regency Columbus; Greater Columbus Convention Center; Columbus, Ohio		Dino Andrade, Greg Ayres, Jessica Calvello, Emily DeJesus, Joe Digiorgi, Greg Houser, Chuck Huber, Samantha Inoue-Harte, Shin Kurokawa, David Matranga, Carli Mosier, Rob Mungle, Bill Rogers, John Swasey, Veronica Taylor, Jessica von Braun, Brett Weaver, David L. Williams, and Lex Winter.
January 13–15, 2017	Hyatt Regency Columbus; Greater Columbus Convention Center; Columbus, Ohio		Yuu Asakawa, Emily DeJesus, Robert DeJesus, Joe Digiorgi, Kyle Hebert, Shin Kurokawa, Kirby Morrow, Yad-Ming Mui, Rob Mungle, Michelle "Mogchelle" Mussoni, Lisa Ortiz, Chris Patton, Monica Rial, Shadow Clone, Rikki Simons, Michael Sinterniklaas, John Swasey, Shinichi Watanabe, E. K. Weaver, and Tavisha Wolfgarth-Simons.
January 26-28, 2018	Hyatt Regency Columbus; Greater Columbus Convention Center; Columbus, Ohio		Automaton, Chris Bevins, Kevin Bolk, Emily DeJesus, Robert DeJesus, Diana Garnet, Samantha Inoue-Harte, Jerry Jewell, Shin Kurokawa, Jamie Marchi, Brandon McInnis, Carli Mosier, Chris Moujaes, Michelle "Mogchelle" Mussoni, Chris Patton, Professor Shyguy, Monica Rial, Rachel Robinson, Shadow Clone, Rikki Simons, Michael Sinterniklaas, Brad Swaile, J. Michael Tatum, Thousand Faces Cosplay, Vitamin H Productions, Shinichi Watanabe, and Tavisha Wolfgarth-Simons.
January 11-13, 2019	Hyatt Regency Columbus; Greater Columbus Convention Center; Columbus, Ohio		Beau Billingslea, Kevin Bolk, Emily DeJesus, Robert DeJesus, Aaron Dismuke, Bill Farmer, Diana Garnet, Caleb Hyles, Jeremy Inman, Samantha Inoue-Harte, Jerry Jewell, Mika Kobayashi, Shin Kurokawa, Jason Marsden, Mike McFarland, Brandon McInnis, Jake Paque, Rikki Simons, Michael Sinterniklaas, J. Michael Tatum, Vitamin H Productions, Shinichi Watanabe, Sarah Wiedenheft, and Tavisha Wolfgarth-Simons.
January 10-12, 2020	Hyatt Regency Columbus; Greater Columbus Convention Center; Columbus, Ohio		Steve Blum, Jessica Calvello, Emily DeJesus, Robert DeJesus, Aaron Dismuke, Melissa Fahn, Fred Gallagher, Diana Garnet, Matt Greenfield, Richard Horvitz, Caleb Hyles, Samantha Inoue-Harte, Jerry Jewell, Brittney Karbowski, Hirokatsu Kihara, Shin Kurokawa, Briana Lawrence, Jason Marsden, Mary Elizabeth McGlynn, Daman Mills, Rob Mungle, Michelle "Mogchelle" Mussoni, Lisa Ortiz, Wendy Powell, Alejandro Saab, Carrie Savage, Rikki Simons, Michael Sinterniklaas, Jessica Walsh, Shinichi Watanabe, Amanda Winn-Lee, Tavisha Wolfgarth-Simons, and Toshifumi Yoshida.
January 22-24, 2021	Online convention		
February 11-13, 2022	Hyatt Regency Columbus; Greater Columbus Convention Center; Columbus, Ohio		Cynthia Cranz, Emily DeJesus, Robert DeJesus, Cole Feuchter, Shin Kurokawa, Jason Marsden, Rob Mungle, Michelle "Mogchelle" Mussoni, Alexander Polinsky, Wendy Powell, Michael Sinterniklaas, John Swasey, Kiba Walker, Kent Williams, and Barry Yandell.
January 19-22, 2023	Hyatt Regency Columbus; Greater Columbus Convention Center; Columbus, Ohio	13,000 paid (est.)	Kevin Bolk, Bill Butts, Jessica Calvello, Cynthia Cranz, Emily DeJesus, Robert DeJesus, Richard Epcar, Cole Feuchter, Chad Hoku, Shin Kurokawa, Lauren Landa, Xander Mobus, Rob Mungle, Michelle "Mogchelle" Mussoni, Trina Nishimura, Philip "Canvas" Odango, Keith Silverstein, Michael Sinterniklaas, Ellyn Stern, Kiba Walker, Shinichi Watanabe, and Kent Williams.
January 18-21, 2024	Hyatt Regency Columbus; Greater Columbus Convention Center; Columbus, Ohio	4,000 paid (est.)	Zach Aguilar, Beau Billingslea, Bill Butts, Jillian Coglan, Samurai Dan Coglan, Richard Epcar, Dorothy Fahn, Tom Fahn, Cole Feuchter, John Gremillion, Caleb Hyles, Samantha Inoue-Harte, Shinichiro Ishikawa, Shin Kurokawa, Emi Lo, Helen McCarthy, Rob Mungle, Michelle "Mogchelle" Mussoni, Joshua Seth, Keith Silverstein, Michael Sinterniklaas, Ellyn Stern, Kiba Walker, Shinichi Watanabe, Michael "Knightmage" Wilson, and Stephanie Young.
January 31 - February 2, 2025	Dayton Convention Center; Dayton, Ohio		Reba Buhr, Samurai Dan Coglan, Cole Feuchter, Jessie James Grelle, Jay Hickman, Samantha Inoue-Harte, Kyle Jones, Rob Mungle, Michelle "Mogchelle" Mussoni, Trina Nishimura, Bryce Papenbrook, Oscar Seung, Michael Sinterniklaas, John Swasey, Olivia Swasey, Veronica Taylor, Kiba Walker, and Shinichi Watanabe.
January 30 – February 1, 2026	Dayton Convention Center; Dayton, Ohio		Grey DeLisle Griffin, Greg Eagles, David Errigo Jr., Dorothy Fahn, Melissa Fahn, Tom Fahn, Analesa Fisher, Richard Horvitz, Brittney Karbowski, Mela Lee, Emi Lo, Rob Mungle, Rikki Simons, Michael Sinterniklaas, Michael "Knightmage" Wilson, and Tavisha Wolfgarth-Simons.
January 29-31, 2027	The Plaza Hotel Columbus at Capitol Square; Columbus, Ohio		Rob Mungle, Michael Sinterniklaas, Austin Tindle, Shinichi Watanabe, and Jenny Yokobori.
