= Yoshikuni =

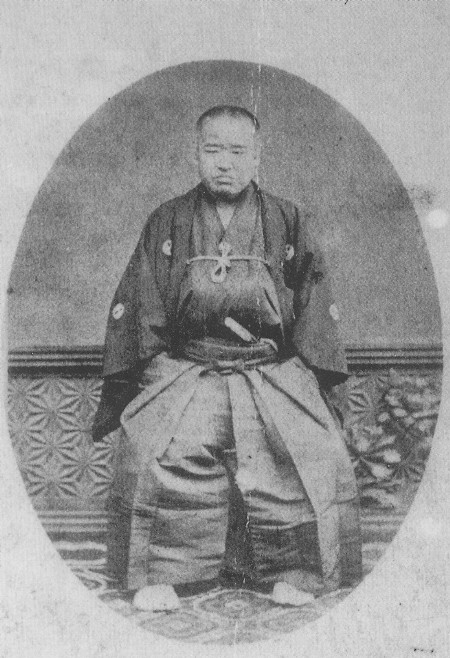
- Yoshikuni Date (1825–1874), Japanese samurai of late-Edo period
- Pronunciation: joɕikɯnʲi (IPA)
- Gender: Male

Origin
- Origin: Japanese
- Meaning: Different meanings depending on the kanji used

Other names
- Alternative spelling: Yosikuni (Kunrei-shiki) Yosikuni (Nihon-shiki) Yoshikuni (Hepburn)

Yoshikuni is both a masculine Japanese given name and a Japanese surname.

== Written forms ==
Yoshikuni can be written using many different combinations of kanji characters. Here are some examples:

- 義国 or 義國, "justice, country"
- 義邦, "justice, country"
- 義州, "justice, state"
- 善国 or 善國, "virtuous, country"
- 善邦, "virtuous, country"
- 善州, "virtuous, state"
- 吉国 or 吉國, "good luck, country"
- 吉邦, "good luck, country"
- 吉州, "good luck, state"
- 良国 or 良國, "good, country"
- 良邦, "good, country"
- 良州, "good, state"
- 恭国, "respectful, country"
- 嘉国, "excellent, country"
- 嘉邦, "excellent, country"
- 能国, "capacity, country"
- 喜国, "rejoice, country"

The name can also be written in hiragana よしくに or katakana ヨシクニ.

== Notable people with the given name Yoshkuni ==
- Yoshikuni Araki (荒木 芳邦) (1921–1997), Japanese landscape architect
- Yoshikuni Date (伊達 慶邦) (1825–1874), Japanese daimyō
- Yoshikuni Matsudaira (松平 吉邦) (1681–1722), Japanese daimyō
- Yoshikuni Minamoto (源 義國) (1082–1155), Japanese samurai

== Notable people with the surname Yoshikuni ==
- Ichiro Yoshikuni (吉國 一郎) (1916–2011), Japanese baseball executive
