= Hartman Building and Theater =

Buildings in Columbus, Ohio

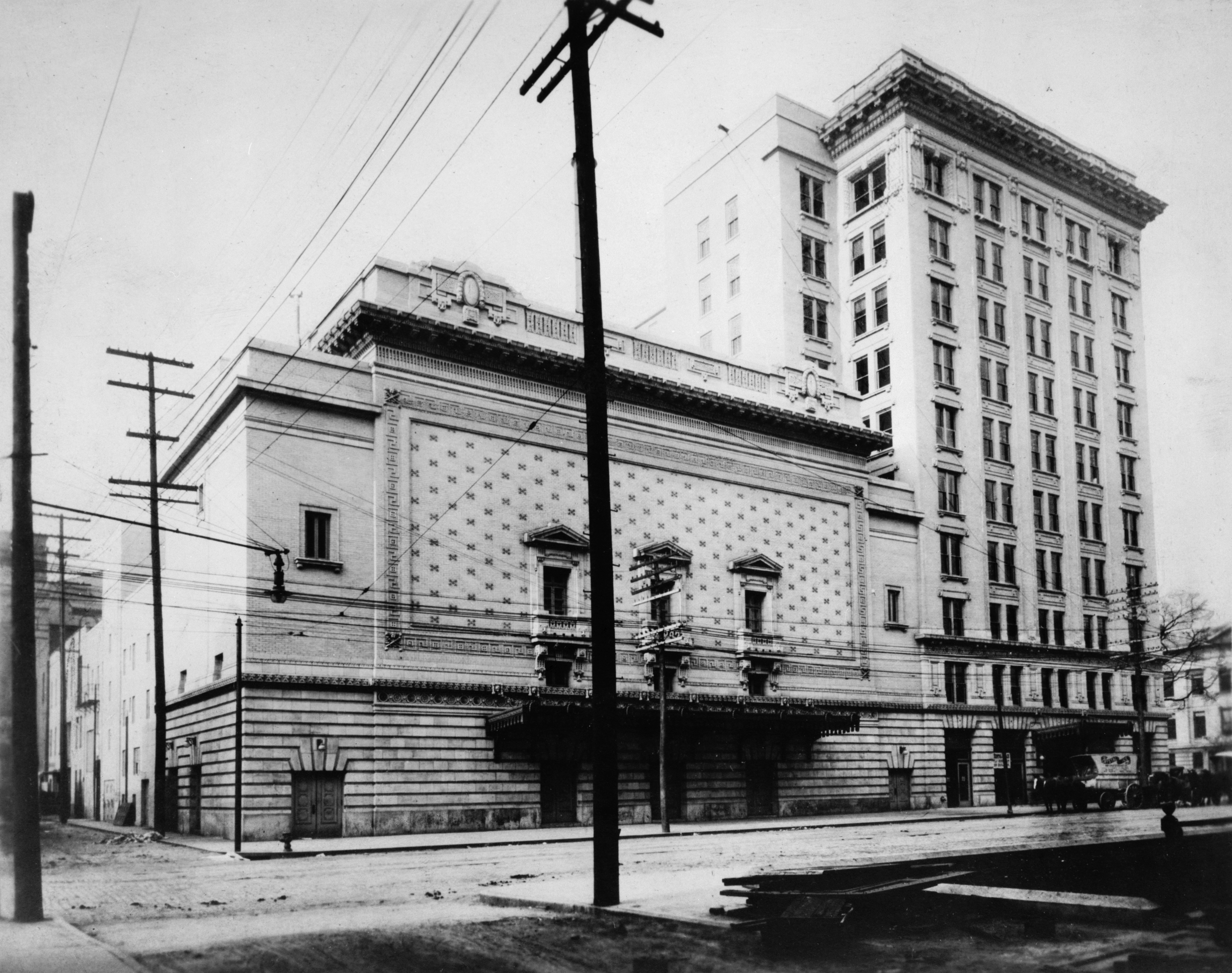
- Exterior view of the structures, c. 1911
- Interactive map pinpointing the buildings' location

General information
- Status: Demolished
- Architectural style: Renaissance Revival
- Location: 73-87 E. State Street, Columbus, Ohio
- Coordinates: 39.9602°N 82.998°W
- Opened: November 13, 1911
- Demolished: 1971 (theater), 1981 (office building)

Design and construction
- Architecture firm: Richards, McCarty and Bulford

The Hartman Building and Theater was a pair of historic buildings on Capitol Square in Downtown Columbus, Ohio. The structures were commissioned by Samuel B. Hartman, designed by Richards, McCarty and Bulford in the Renaissance Revival style. The theater was demolished in 1971, followed by the office building in 1981.

== Description ==
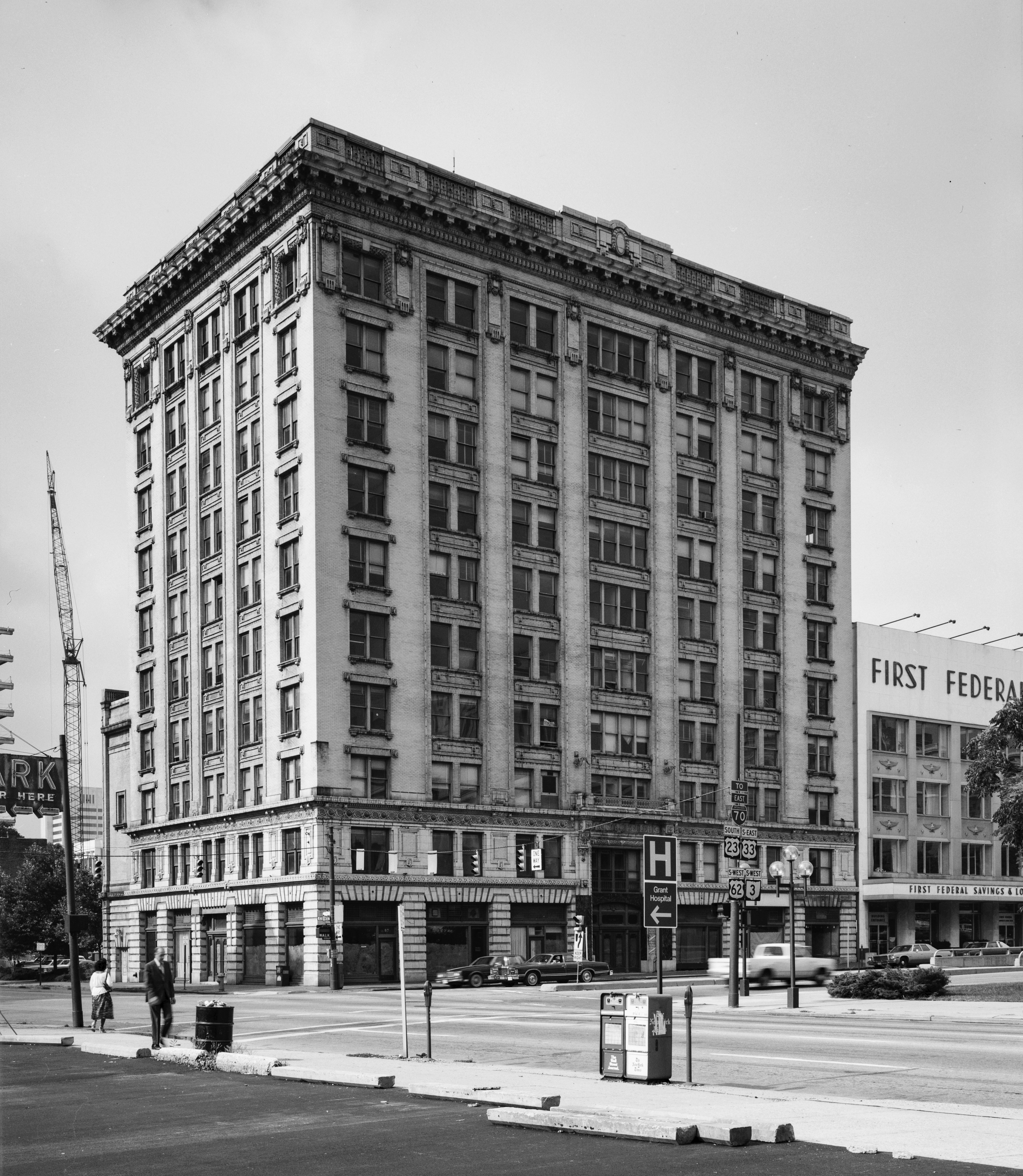
State Street facade of the Hartman Building, 1980

The site, on the southwest corner of State and Third Streets, is now occupied by the Capitol Square skyscraper and the Sheraton Columbus Hotel at Capitol Square. The ten-story Hartman Office Building faced the Ohio Statehouse across State Street; the Hartman Theater faced Third Street. Both were designed by Richards, McCarty and Bulford in the Renaissance Revival style. The buildings used the same materials, though were markedly different in exterior features, leading some to suggest the two were built at different times.

The exterior of the office building utilized terra cotta elements. The building had elaborate decoration around its first two floors, the distinctive lower section of the structure. A balcony above ornate brackets sat above these stories. The third through ninth floors were nearly entirely of brick, the second section. The third section, at the tenth floor and above, included an ornate projecting cornice below a balustrade at the building's crown, with an oval medallion centered at the top of the State Street façade.

Most of the theater interior was designed by Lee Milton Boda, who became the theater's manager and helped influence its success. The auditorium was wide and shallow in depth, column-less, and with a large stage, providing greater intimacy between the audience and performers. The low seat count, however, may have limited the theater's profitability.

Notable performers at the Hartman Theater included Al Jolson, Maude Adams, George Arliss, Otis Skinner, Helen Hayes, Tallulah Bankhead, Katharine Hepburn, Joseph Cotten, Van Heflin, and Ethel, Lionel, and John Barrymore.

== History ==
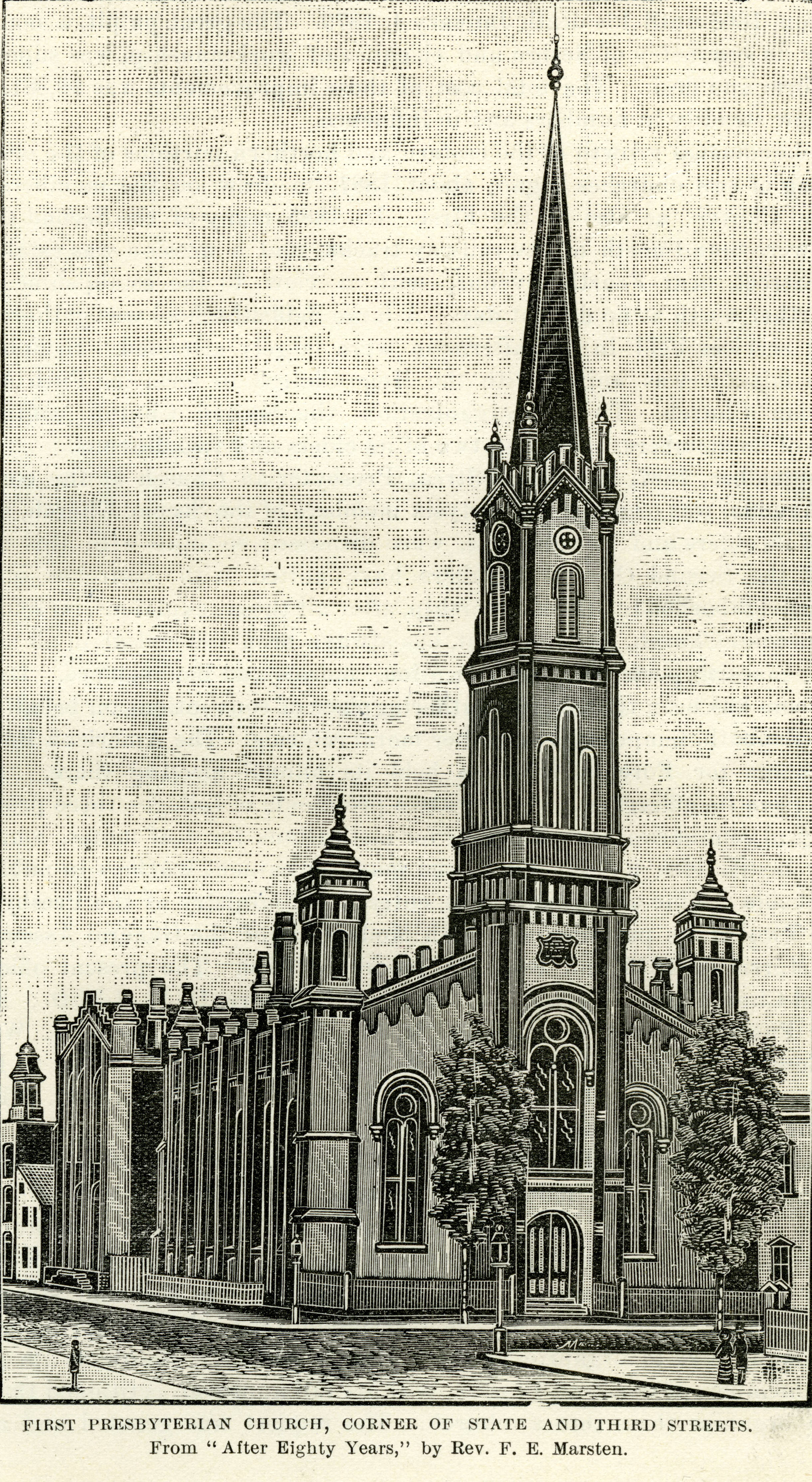
First Presbyterian Church, published 1892

The site was home to the First Presbyterian Church, built in 1830. Remodeled in 1850 and 1859; in the latter year it gained a tall tower and even taller spire, becoming by design the "tallest church west of the Alleghenies", and it was considered the grandest church in the city at one point, and a landmark for the city for many years. The building was the first Columbus home of the YMCA, and was an important meeting site, including holding a reception for former U.S. president John Quincy Adams. The church abandoned the building in 1900, moving to 1191 Bryden Road. The organization began renting out the building, where it served the Hayden Tile and Mantle Co. as a display room, and later the Columbus Press-Post, which itself abandoned the building in 1907. The vacant building was demolished in August 1910 by contractor Henry Lauer.

Earlier in 1910, Samuel B. Hartman's adult daughter Maribel talked him into constructing a new building and theater on the site; she reportedly desired the theater as part of her interest in drama and music and dream of being a star. Hartman was the richest person in Columbus at the time as the owner of a business empire in the city, including the Peruna Drug Manufacturing Company, the Hartman Hotel, the Hartman Sanitarium, and the Hartman Stock Farm. The new buildings opened November 13, 1911, completed at a cost of $200,000. The theater's first show, on that day, was The Pink Lady starring Cecil Cunningham.

Over the next sixty years, the Hartman Theater was a major venue for concerts, films, and theater productions, and a favorite for performers and guests. It was the premier venue for live theater. The Hartman was selected for the world premiere of the play A Moon for the Misbegotten in 1947.

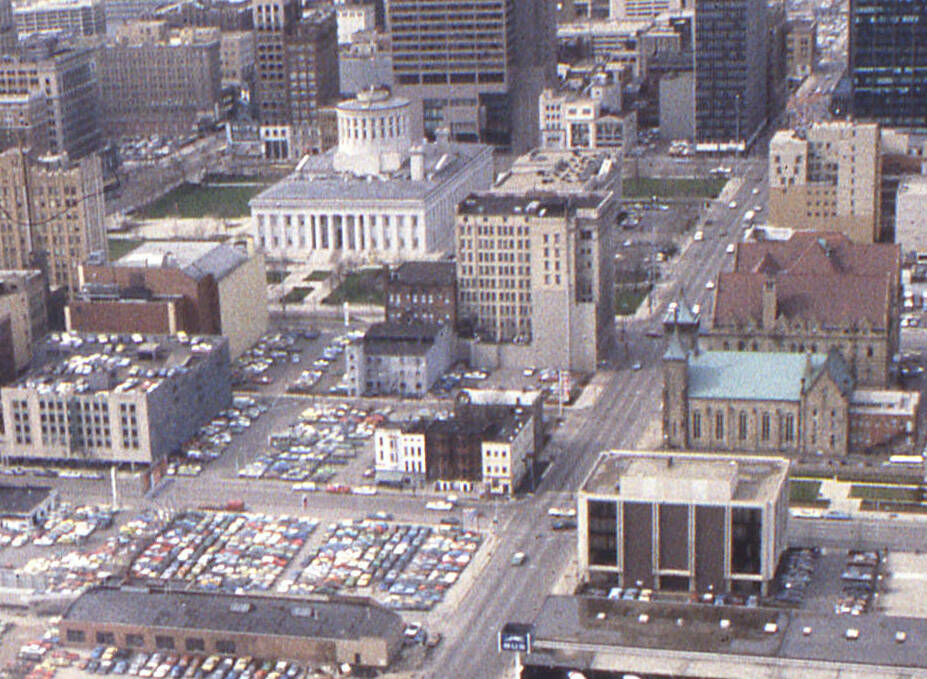
The Hartman Building (center) in 1979, after demolition of the theater

In the 1960s, as downtown theaters struggled with rising maintenance costs, changing audience tastes, and competing against each other and the newer high-capacity Franklin County Veterans Memorial auditorium. The Hartman Theater closed in 1969, about the same time that the neighboring Grand and Ohio theaters closed. The S.G. Loewendick & Sons demolition company was commissioned to take down the building in 1971, and the land was used for parking over the next decade. The Hartman Building stood on the site until 1981, making way for the Capitol Square skyscraper and the Sheraton Columbus Hotel at Capitol Square, which sit at the site today.

Two of the Hartman Theater's crystal chandeliers hang in the lower-level lounge of the Palace Theatre today.

== See also ==
- List of demolished buildings and structures in Columbus, Ohio
