= Naiads (Greaves) =

Fountain and sculpture in Columbus, Ohio, U.S.

- Artist: Jack Greaves
- Year: 1984
- Subject: Naiads
- Location: Columbus, Ohio, United States
- 39°57′36.85″N 82°59′53.25″W

Naiads is a 1984 fountain and sculpture by Jack Greaves, installed by the Capitol Square skyscraper in Columbus, Ohio.

== Description and history ==
The bronze sculpture depicts two nude women with nine birds flying above. They rest on a base depicting swimming salmon and sunfish. Naiads was surveyed by the Smithsonian Institution's "Save Outdoor Sculpture!" program in 1994.

== See also ==
- 1984 in art
