= Max Abramovitz =

American architect (1908–2004)

- Born: May 23, 1908; Chicago, Illinois, U.S.
- Died: September 12, 2004 (aged 96); Pound Ridge, New York, U.S.
- Education: University of Illinois at Urbana-Champaign, Columbia University School of Architecture, École des Beaux-Arts
- Occupation: Architect
- Awards: Resident of the American Academy in Rome (RAAR 1961)
- Practice: Harrison & Abramovitz
- Buildings: David Geffen Hall, Phoenix Life Insurance Company Building

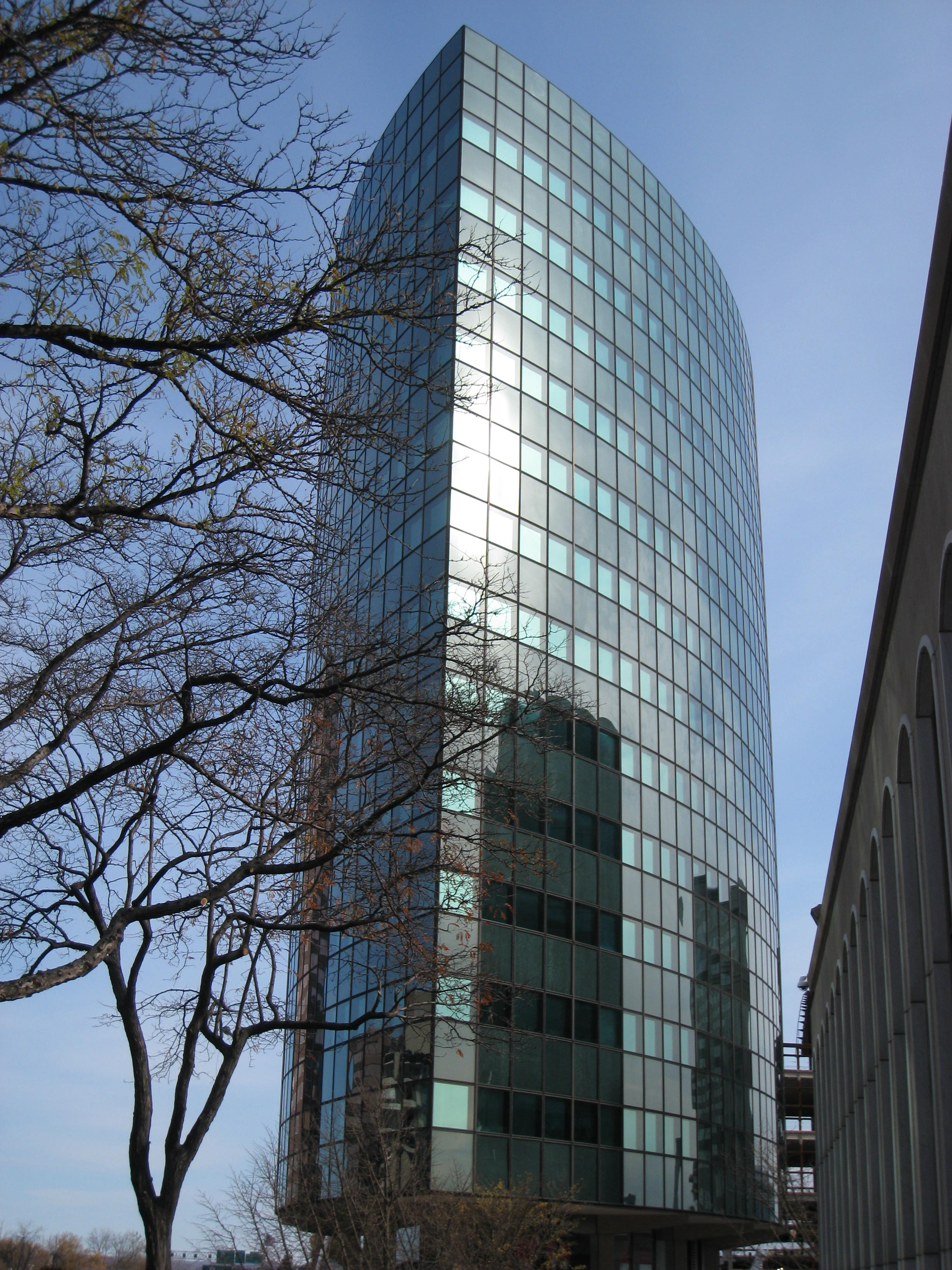
Phoenix Life Insurance Company Building, Hartford, Connecticut, 1963

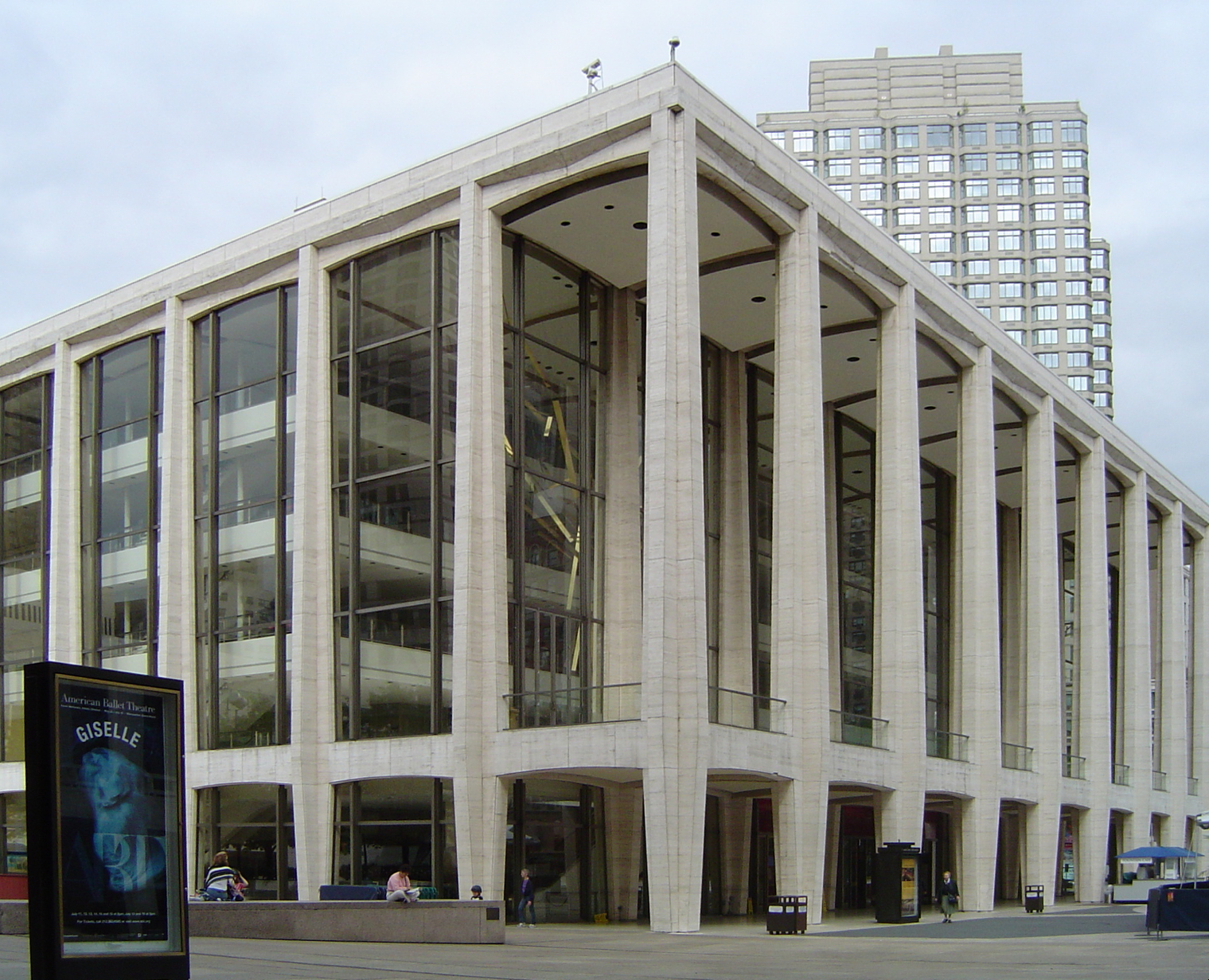
David Geffen Hall, formerly known as Avery Fisher Hall at Lincoln Center.

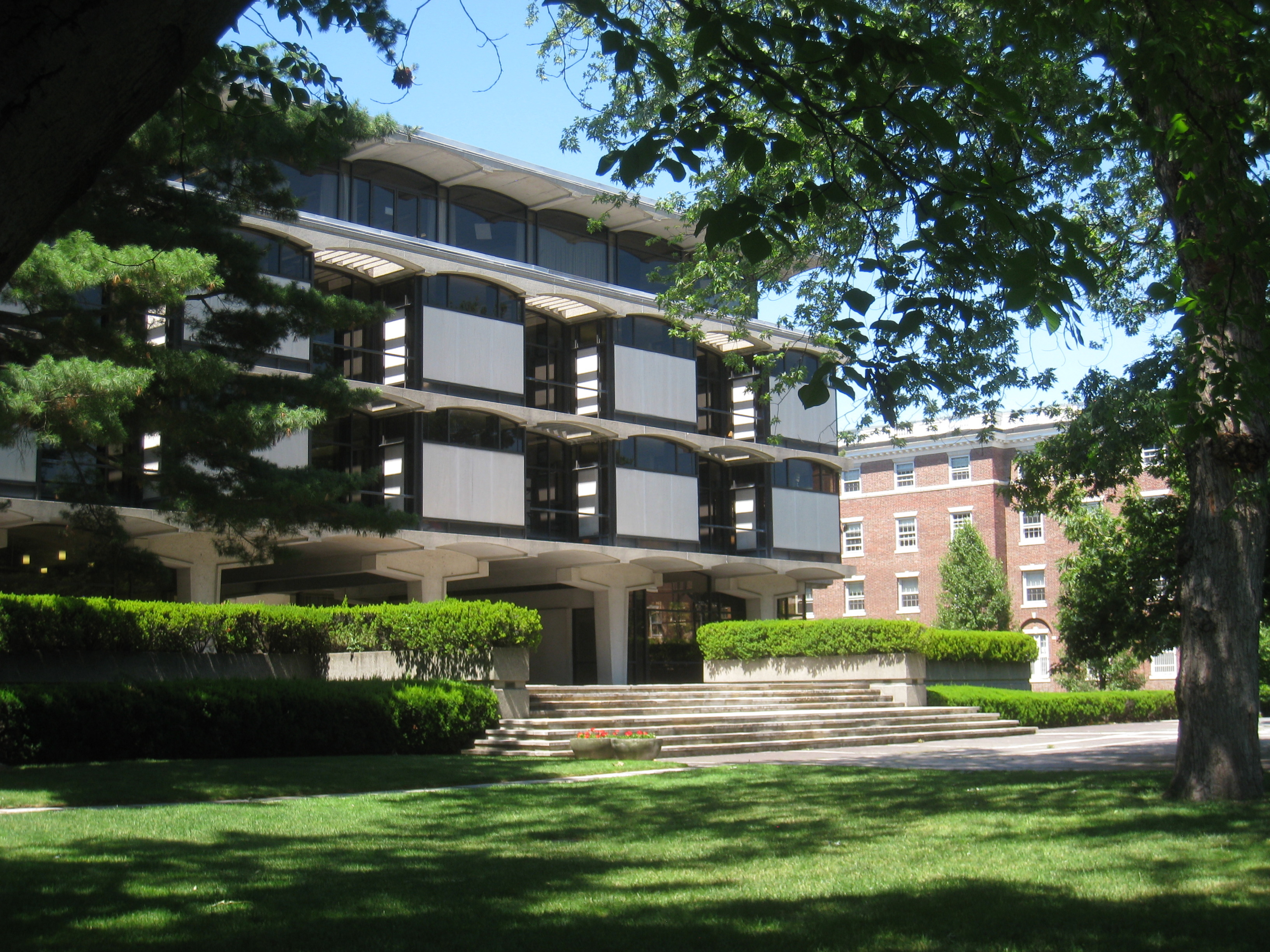
Hilles Library, Radcliffe Quadrangle, Harvard University

Max Abramovitz (May 23, 1908 – September 12, 2004) was an American architect. He was best known for his work with the New York City firm Harrison & Abramovitz.

== Life ==
Abramovitz was the son of Romanian Jewish immigrant parents. He graduated in 1929 from the University of Illinois at Urbana-Champaign School of Architecture. While at Illinois, Abramovitz was a member of the Tau Epsilon Phi fraternity. He later received an M.S. from Columbia University's architecture school in 1931. He also was the recipient of a two-year fellowship at the École des Beaux-Arts in Paris before returning to the US and becoming partners with Wallace Harrison from 1941 to 1976. In 1961, he was an invited resident (RAAR) of the American Academy in Rome.

Abramovitz died in September 2004 in Pound Ridge, New York, at the age of 96. His drawings and archives are held by the Avery Architectural and Fine Arts Library at Columbia University. Abramovitz also received an honorary Doctorate in Fine Arts from the University of Illinois in 1970.

== Work ==
=== Brandeis University ===
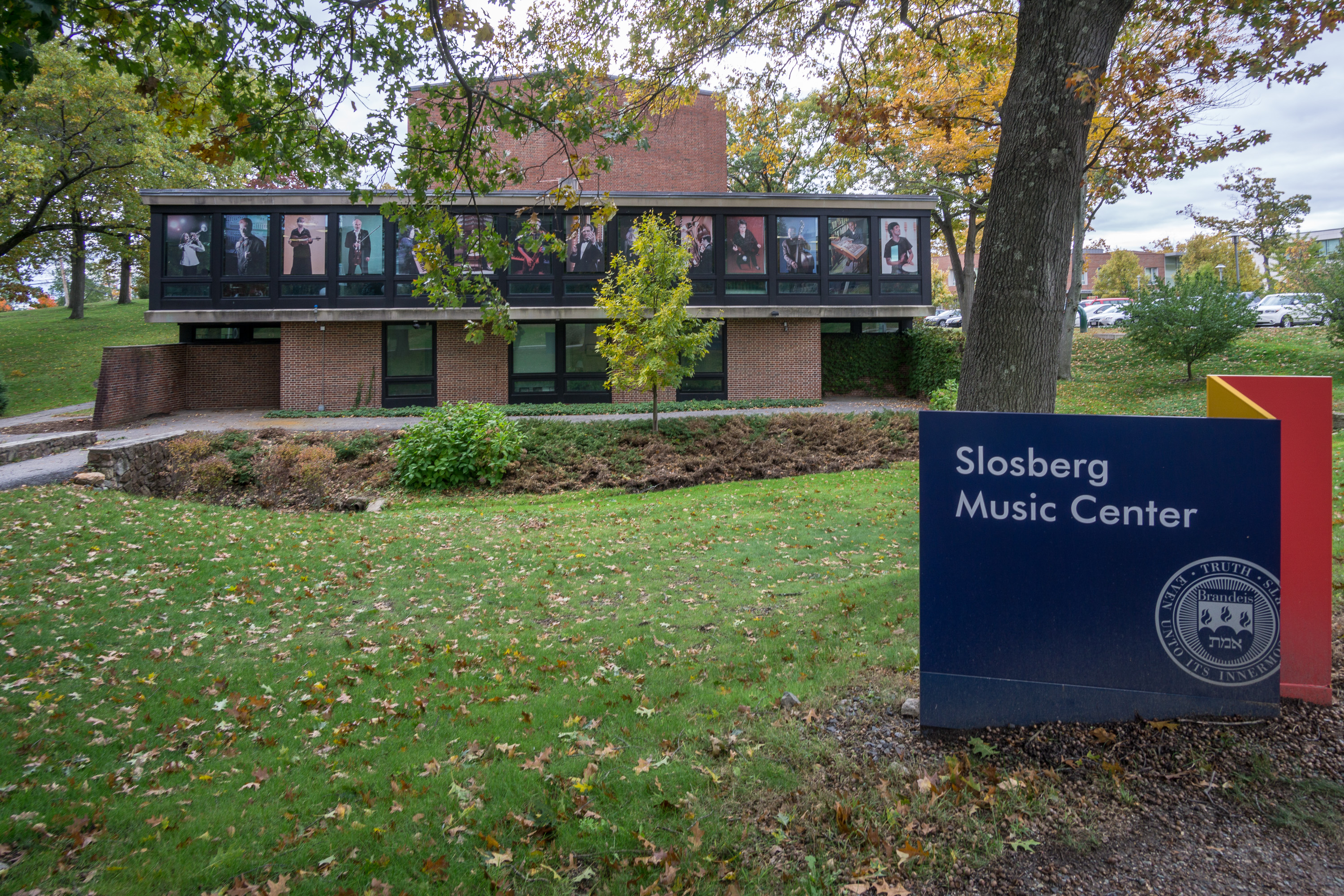
Slosberg Music Center

Abramovitz was a friend and student of Brandeis University president Abram L. Sachar, who recruited him to work on his new campus. For 30 years, Abramovitz oversaw university planning, was a University Fellow and served on its Board of Overseers and the Creative Arts Commission. Abramovitz designed the "vast majority of buildings on the Brandeis campus" during the mid-1950s, including:

- The Three Chapels, 1955
- Slosberg Music Center, 1957
- Pearlman Hall, 1957
- The Rose Art Museum, 1961

=== Other work ===
- Jerome Greene Hall at Columbia University, New York, 1961
- David Geffen Hall at Lincoln Center, originally called Philharmonic Hall, and later Avery Fisher Hall, New York City, 1962
- three buildings on the campus of the University of Illinois Urbana-Champaign
  - State Farm Center (formerly Assembly Hall), at its time the world's largest edge-supported dome, 1963
  - Krannert Center for the Performing Arts, 1969
  - Hillel International building, 1951
- Phoenix Life Insurance Company Building, Hartford, Connecticut, 1963
- Temple Beth Zion, Buffalo, New York, 1967 images
- the University of Iowa Museum of Art, and the Arts Campus of the University of Iowa, Iowa City, Iowa, 1968 onwards
- the International Affairs Building at Columbia University, New York, 1970
- the U.S. Steel Tower (also known as USX Tower) Pittsburgh, Pennsylvania, 1970
- National City Tower, Louisville, Kentucky, 1972
- the Tour Gan, La Defense, Paris, France, 1974
- the Learning Research and Development Center building, University of Pittsburgh, 1974, demolished 2022
- One SeaGate, Toledo, Ohio, 1982 (as Abramovitz, Harris & Kingsland)
- AEP Building, Columbus, Ohio, 1983 (as Abramovitz, Harris & Kingsland)
- Capitol Square, Columbus, Ohio, 1984 (as Abramovitz, Harris & Kingsland)
- Rockefeller Center, in New York City, and the interior of Radio City Music Hall in Rockefeller Center
- Student Organization Center at Hilles, formerly the Hilles Library at Radcliffe College and now a part of Harvard University
