= 65 East State (Columbus, Ohio) =

Skyscraper on Capitol Square in Downtown Columbus, Ohio

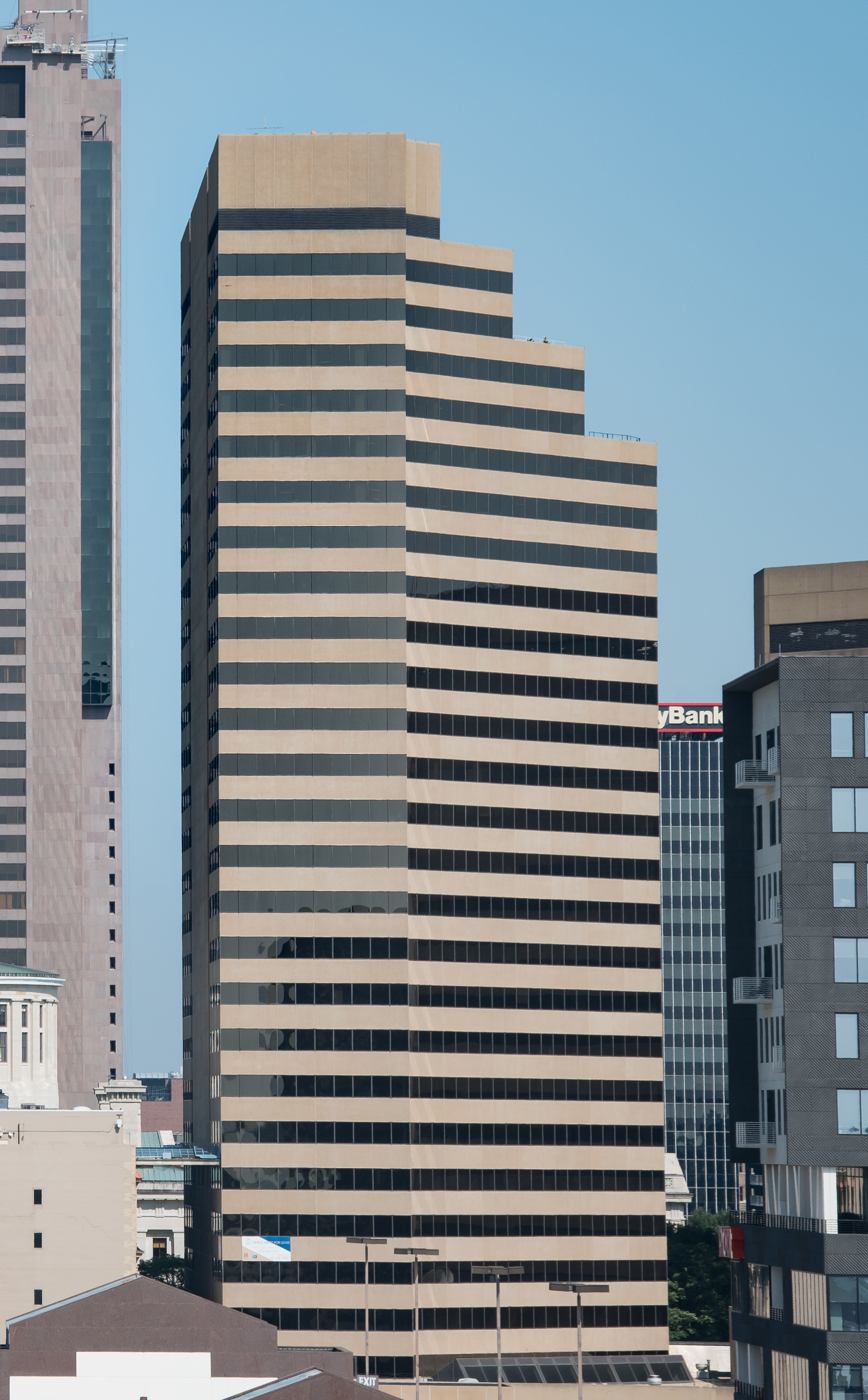
- Interactive map of the 65 East State area

General information
- Type: Office
- Location: 65 East State Street, Columbus, Ohio
- Coordinates: 39.96003°N 82.99819°W
- Completed: 1984

Height
- Roof: 350 ft (110 m)

Technical details
- Floor count: 26
- Floor area: 494,483 ft (150,718 m)

65 East State (formerly Capitol Square) is a 350-foot-tall (110 m) skyscraper on Capitol Square in Downtown Columbus, Ohio. It was completed in 1984, has 26 floors, and 494,480 sq ft (45,939 m^{2}) of floor space. The building was designed by the architectural firm Abramovitz, Harris & Kingsland and it follows the international and modern architectural styles. Capitol Square is the 13th tallest building in Columbus.

The 20-floor Sheraton Columbus Hotel at Capitol Square is part of the same complex, and is constructed on the former site of the Hartman Building.

The statue Naiads is situated in a courtyard between Capitol Square and the adjoining Plaza Hotel. West of Capitol Square is a courtyard created in 1984 between the building and the Ohio Theatre, including the Galbreath Pavilion.

== Gallery ==
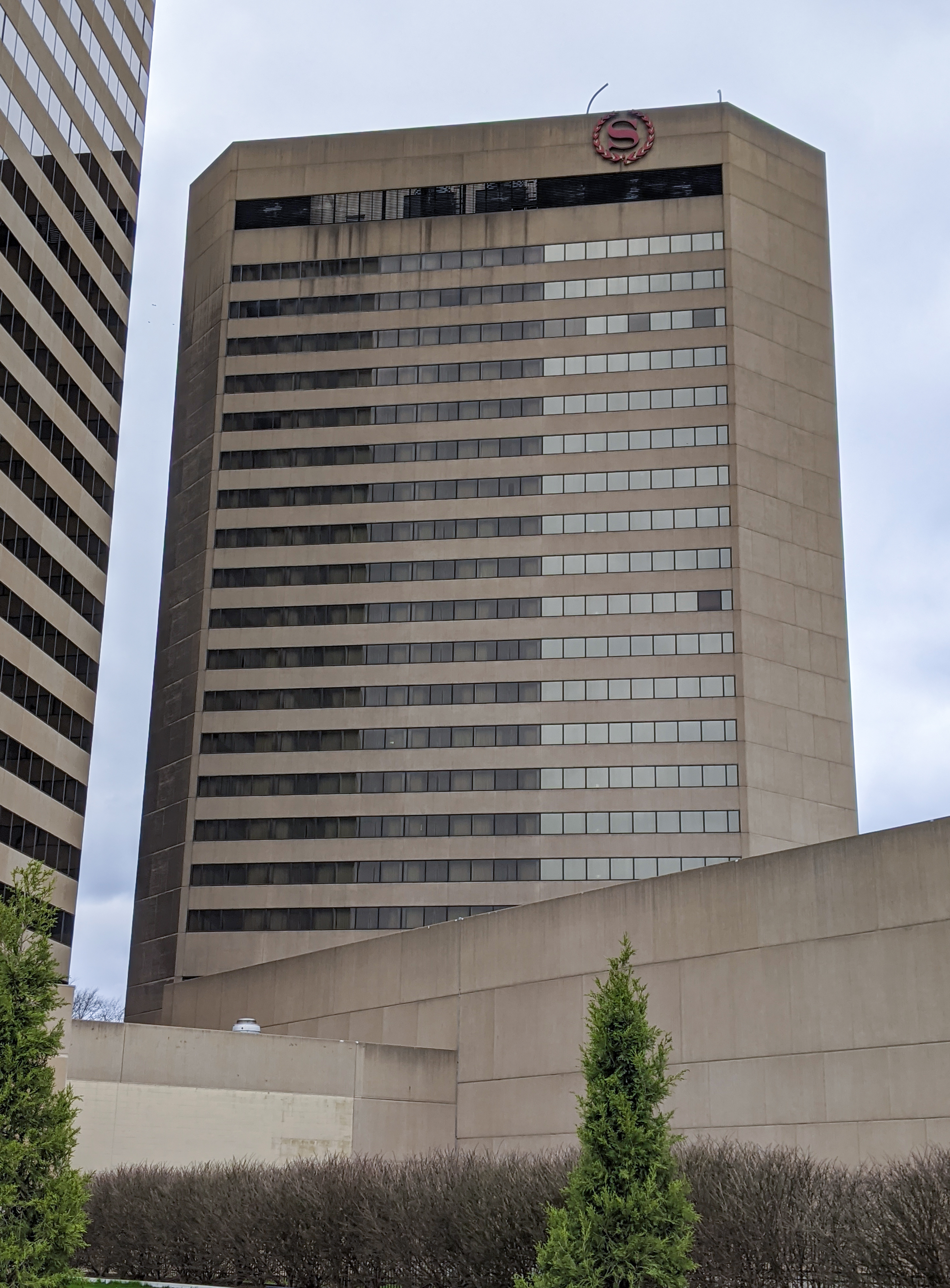
The Plaza Hotel Columbus at Capitol Square

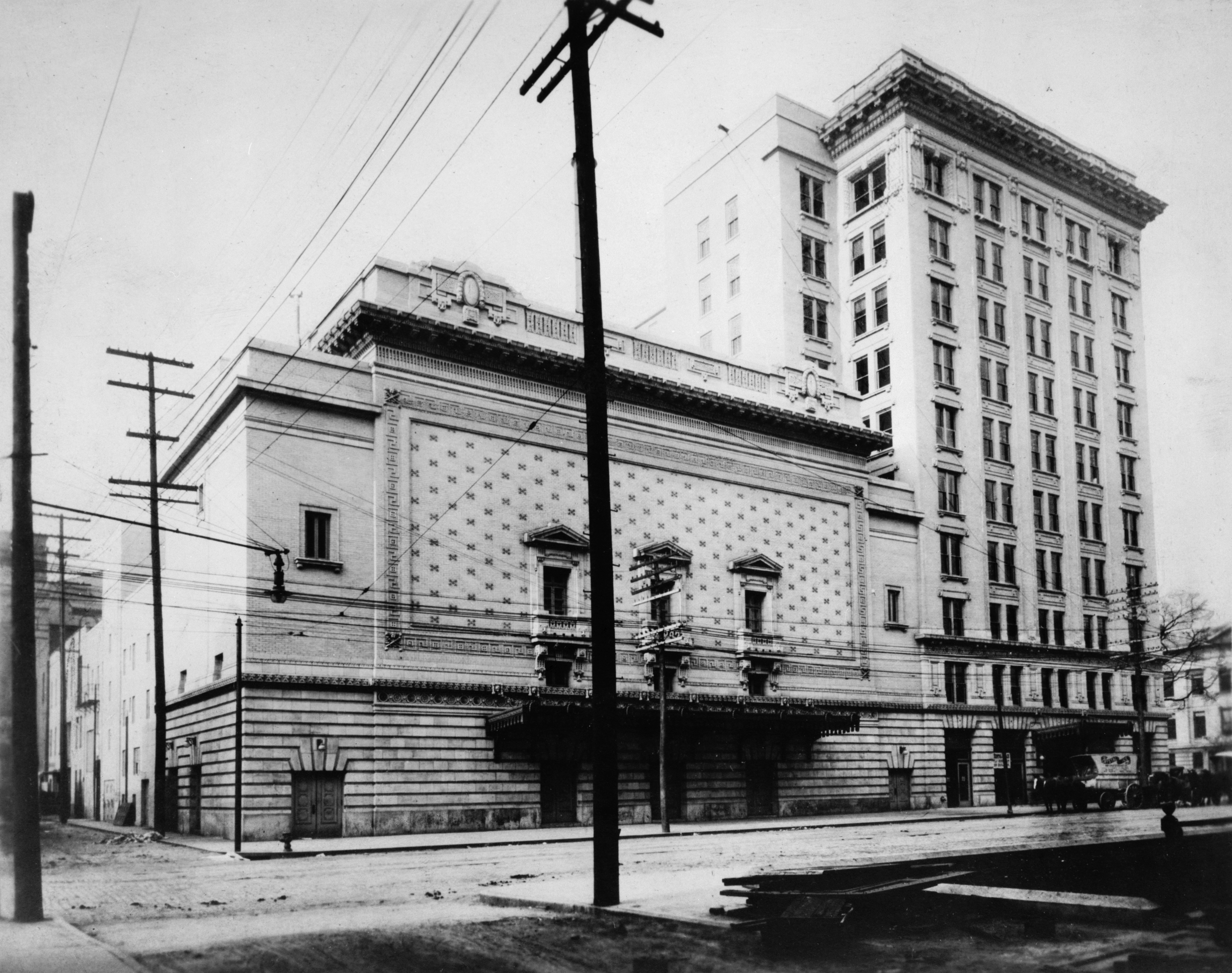
Hartman Building and Theater, formerly on the site

== See also ==
- List of tallest buildings in Columbus, Ohio
