= Waterfall Garden Park =

Park in Seattle, Washington, United States

- UPS Park, UPS Waterfall Park
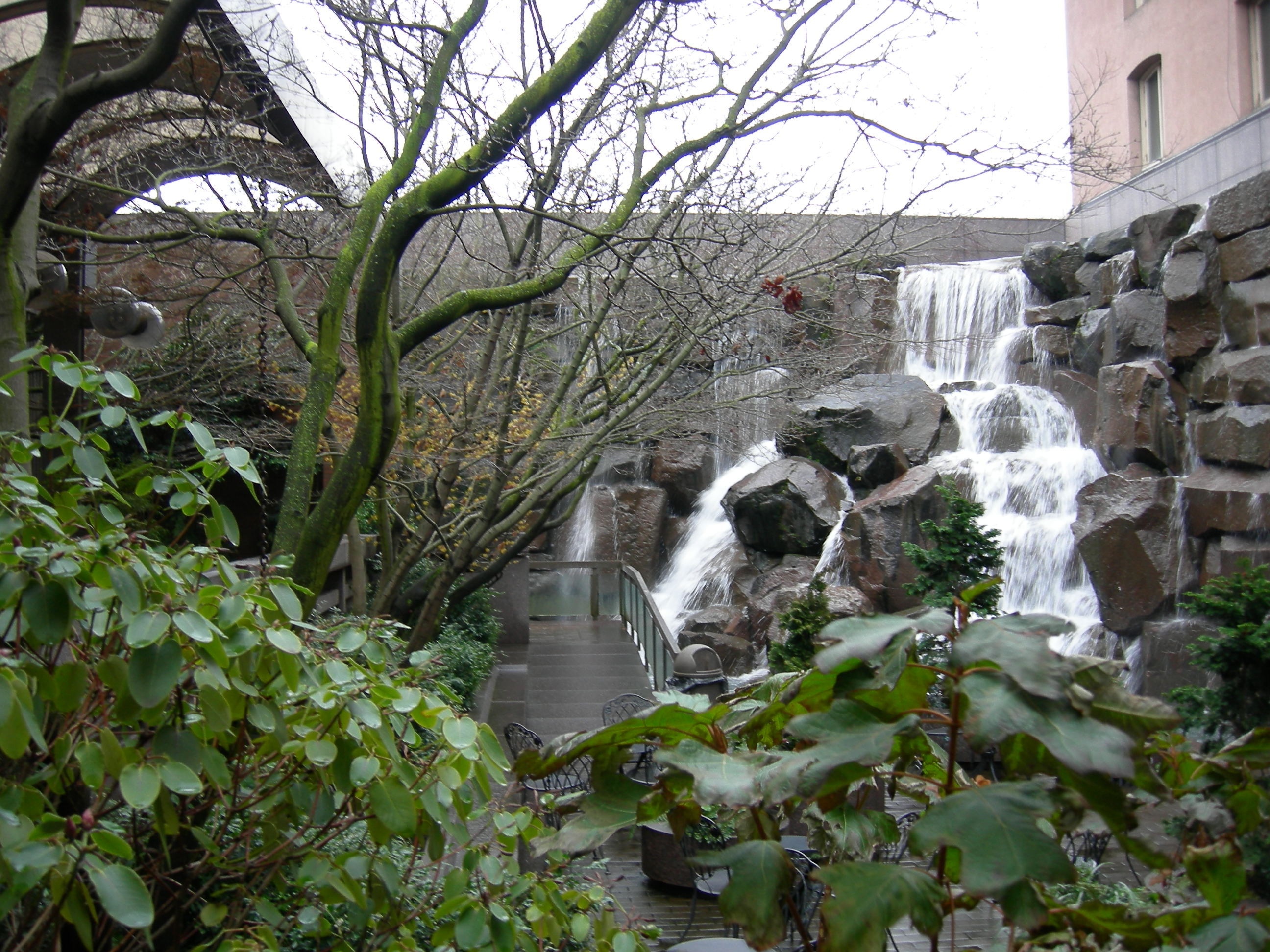
- The park in 2007

- Location within Downtown Seattle Location within Washington (state)
- Type: Pocket park; Japanese garden
- Location: Second and Main Streets, Pioneer Square, Seattle
- Coordinates: 47°36′01″N 122°19′55″W
- Opened: 1978
- Designer: Masao Kinoshita
- Owner: Annie E. Casey Foundation

Waterfall Garden Park, also called UPS Park and UPS Waterfall Park, is a private 60-by-80-foot (18 m × 24 m) pocket park in Seattle, Washington, created in 1978 at the original United Parcel Service building in Pioneer Square. It is open to the public during the day and closed at night. The park was designed by Masao Kinoshita with Sasaki Associates and funded by Annie E. Casey Foundation to commemorate UPS's founder, James Casey. The park is named for a manmade 22-foot (6.7 m) tall waterfall over which is pumped 5,000 US gallons (19,000 L) of water per minute. It is described as "one of the most expensive parks per square foot ever built in the United States". Roger Sale says in the guidebook Seeing Seattle that the park is locked at night to keep out the sizeable Pioneer Square homeless population.

The park's Japanese garden includes Chamaecyparis obtusa and other botanicals native to Japan, and a pool designed by Yoshikuni Araki. The garden won the Environmental Award of the American Nurserymens Association in 1981.

== See also ==
- History of the Japanese in Seattle
- Privately owned public space
