= Hotel America (Hartford, Connecticut) =

- U.S. National Register of Historic Places
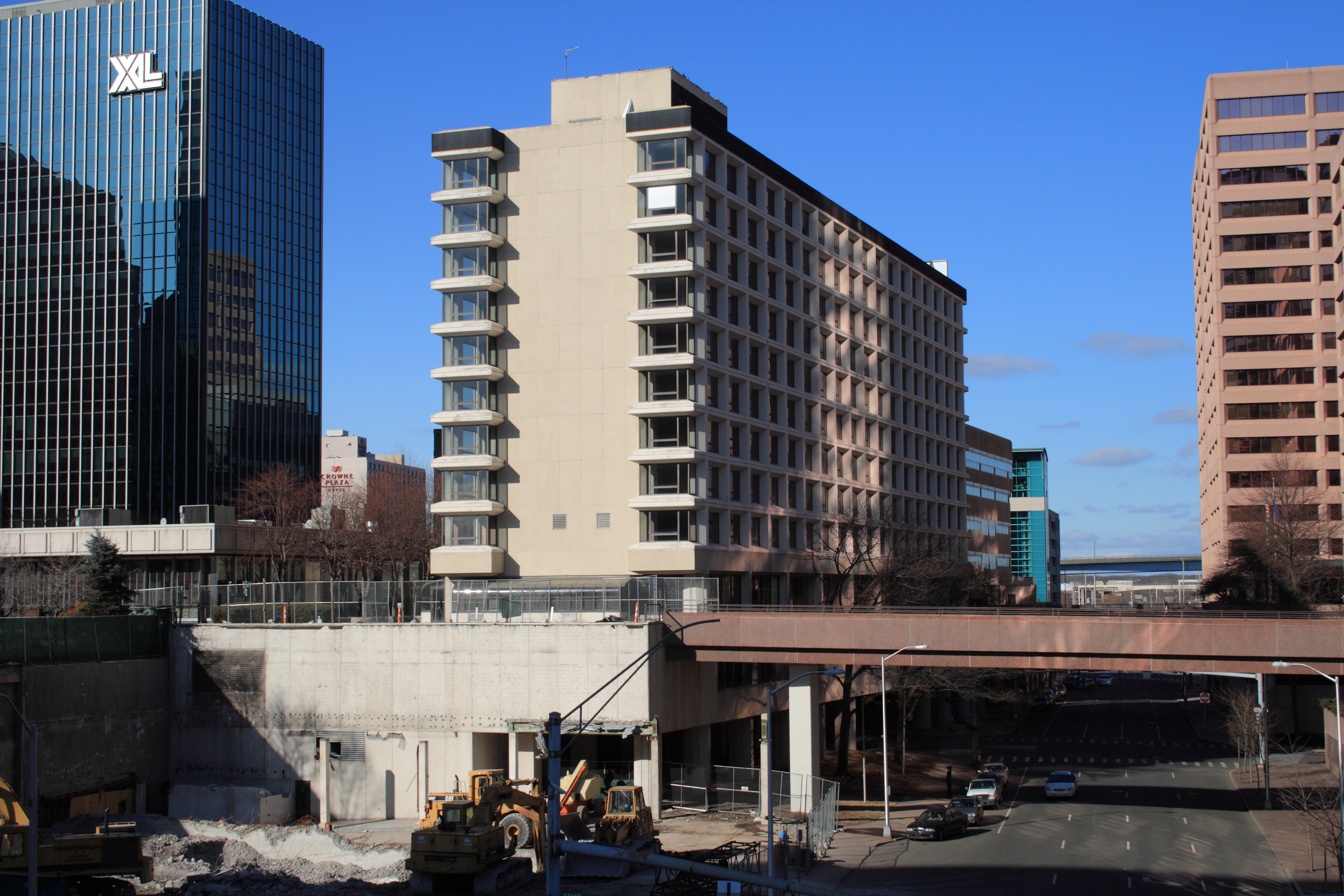

- Location within Connecticut Location within the United States
- Location: 5 Constitution Avenue, Hartford, Connecticut
- Coordinates: 41°46′0″N 72°40′11″W
- Area: less than one acre
- Built: 1964
- Architect: Curtis & Davis
- Architectural style: Mid-Century Modern
- NRHP reference No.: 12000359
- Added to NRHP: September 7, 2012

The Hotel America is a historic former hotel building at 5 Constitution Avenue on Constitution Plaza in Hartford, Connecticut. Built in 1964, it is believed to be the first building erected in the state as part of an urban redevelopment project, and is an important local early example of Modern architecture. Now the Spectra Boutique Apartments, it was listed on the National Register of Historic Places in 2012.

== Description and history ==
The former Hotel America building marks the eastern end of Constitution Plaza, a major 1960s development on the east side of Hartford's downtown. It is a twelve-story structure, built out of steel, concrete, and glass. Its main axis is oriented north–south, with the building passing over Kinsey Street on large steel I-beam trusses.

The Hartford Redevelopment Agency was founded in 1950, and Constitution Plaza was its first major project, designed to revitalize an urban slum area on Hartford's east side. The Hotel America building was designed by Curtis & Davis, a firm noted for its Modernist architecture, and was completed in 1964. The trusses carrying the building over Kinsey Street were the largest made to date in the state. The hotel's branding changed several times over the years, named as a Sonesta, and in its later years, as a Clarion Hotel. The vacant building was acquired by developers in 2011 and converted into luxury apartments.

== See also ==
- National Register of Historic Places listings in Hartford, Connecticut
