= Masao Kinoshita (architect) =

American landscape architect (1953-2003)

Masao Kinoshita (木下 正夫, Kinoshita Masao, 1925 - 2003) was an American landscape architect.

Kinoshita was born in Los Angeles, California, then spent his childhood in Japan, returning to the U.S. in 1940. After the Japanese attack on Pearl Harbor, he was first interned in Arkansas, but subsequently served as an interpreter in the United States Army. He received his BA in Architecture from Cornell University in 1955, then received a fellowship to study in Japan, and in 1957 was awarded a Master of Science in Japanese History from Kyoto University. He then worked for the firms of Isoya Yoshida (Tokyo) and Eero Saarinen in Birmingham, Michigan. In 1961, Kinoshita received his Master of Architecture degree in Urban Design from the Harvard University Graduate School of Design, and joined Sasaki, Dawson & DeMay, in Watertown, Massachusetts, where he eventually became a principal. He left Sasaki in 1977 to establish the Urban Design Collaborative International in Columbus, Ohio, and from 1977 to 1990 also served as a professor at Ohio State University and a visiting critic at Harvard, Syracuse, and Yale.

== Selected works ==
- Waterfall Garden Park, Seattle
- Greenacre Park, New York City
- Constitution Plaza landscaping, fountain, and clock, Hartford
- National Bonsai & Penjing Museum, United States National Arboretum, Washington, DC
- I-Beam, Binghamton, New York

== Honors ==
- Charles Goodwin Sands Medal
- Robert James Eiditz Fellowship
