= Constitution Plaza =

Mixed-use development in Hartford, Connecticut

Coordinates: 41.766°N 72.670°W

Constitution Plaza

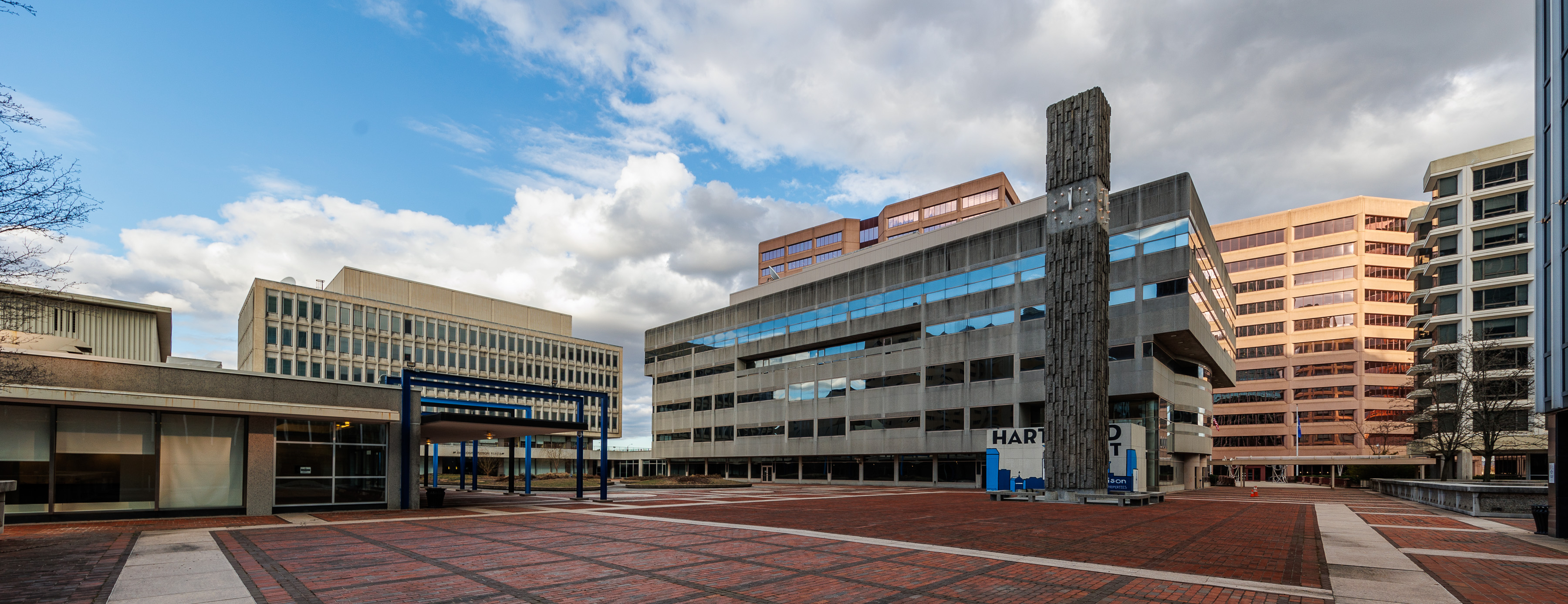
Northern plaza

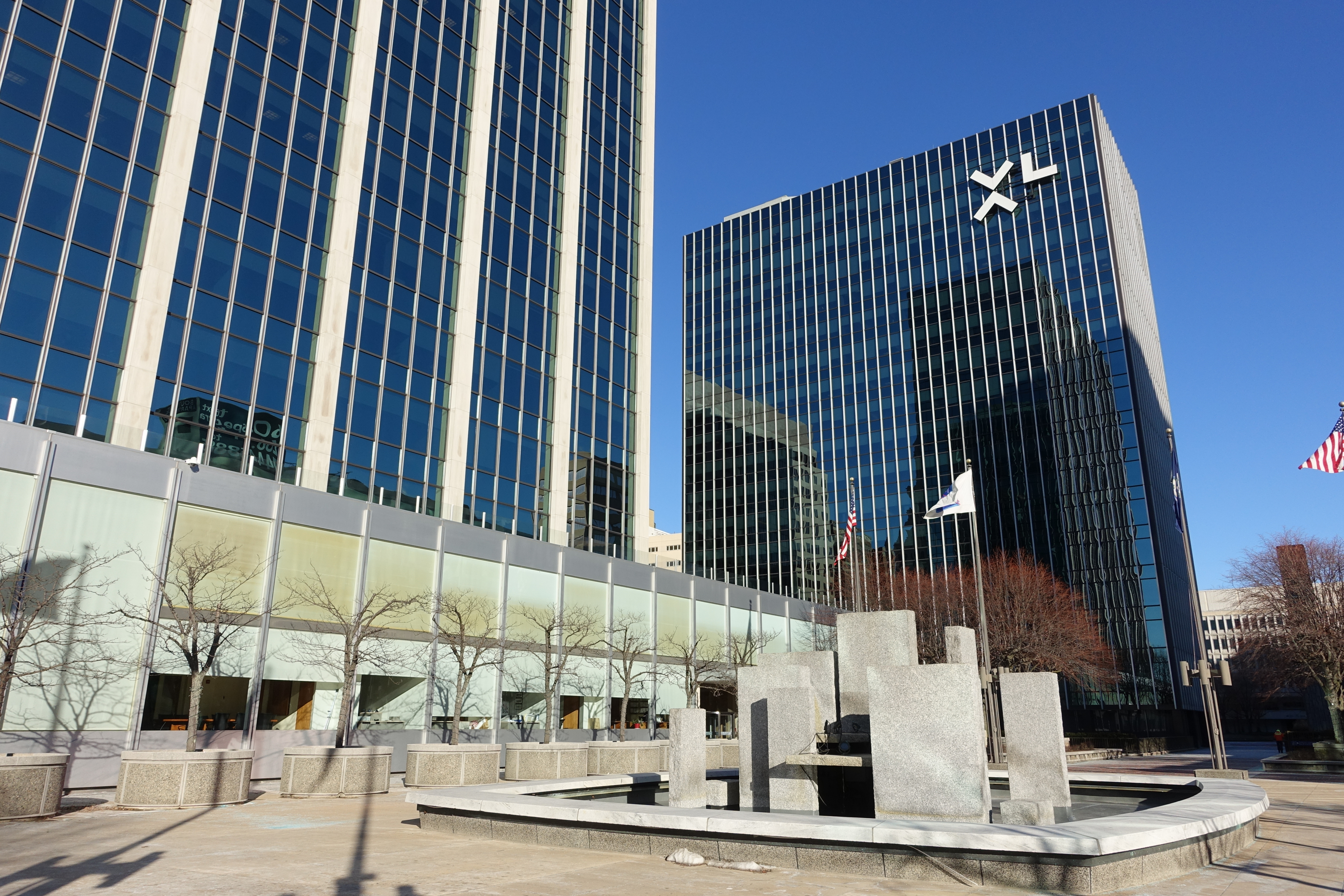
Southern plaza

Constitution Plaza is a large commercial mixed-use development in Downtown Hartford, Connecticut. It is located on the east side of the downtown area, near the Old State House. The plaza consists of two main plazas, which are connected by an elevated bridge. The northern plaza is reminiscent of an Italian piazza, with a 40-foot-tall granite clock tower and patterned brick paving. The southern plaza is dominated by a central fountain.

== Construction ==
Constitution Plaza was built for $42 million and completed in stages from 1961 to 1964. Its planning and construction were spearheaded by a committee of local corporate leaders and business interests, beginning in the late 1950s. After running into financial turmoil in its early stages, the project was eventually taken-over and completed by Hartford-based Travelers Insurance Company.

It was the first substantial urban redevelopment project in Hartford and replaced a run-down, working class, ethnic neighborhood known as Front Street. Subject to periodic flooding (before the construction of riverfront dikes and Interstate 91) and in serious physical decline, this neighborhood was nostalgically known for its large Italian-American population and its eclectic collection of local restaurants, businesses and shops. The merit of its wholesale demolition to accommodate Constitution Plaza is still locally debated nearly six decades after it occurred. (The name "Front Street" which so well-gilded through decades of its lamented demise, was resurrected as the official project name for a large mixed-use development to be built adjacent to the new Connecticut Convention Center complex, although this project has experienced numerous delays and has lost a number of sponsoring developer partners over the last several years.)

== Locale ==
Situated at the eastern side of Hartford's downtown area, near Connecticut's landmark Old State House, this complex of office towers, commercial buildings, parking garages, and luxury apartments covers three city blocks, and is connected by a series of elevated pedestrian plazas and bridges.

Constitution Plaza is considered by some as a "great-but-unfinished planning idea", and by others as a fallacy of the broken promises of mid-century, American urban renewal.

Set on a gently sloping site, the raised plaza originated from the idea of setting it at the elevation of Hartford's once-vibrant Main Street and its numerous, but now long-gone department stores that sat a block west. The Main Street shopping district was to be connected to Constitution Plaza by overhead pedestrian bridges, down along both Temple and Kinsley Streets across Market Street, but for various reasons they were never built. (Kinsley Street no longer exists, having been absorbed into the site for the "State House Square" office and mixed-use complex) A proposed arena and convention center was to be sited east of the Plaza across Columbus Boulevard and adjacent to I-91, but these facilities were also eliminated from the original plan and later moved a block west of Main Street in the mid 1970s, which became the original Hartford Civic Center and was rebuilt in the mid 2000s as today's PeoplesBank Arena.

As a result, Constitution Plaza today sits several feet above the city's streetscape, disconnected and mostly devoid of pedestrian life except during workdays. This is also a primary reason that the plaza's original "retail court" was never successful. However, as later office tower development occurred on adjacent blocks, in particular to the east and south, additional pedestrian bridges were built to connect them to the main Plaza level. Most successful was the culmination of a 25-year effort through the much-regarded Riverfront Recapture initiative. Fulfilling a long-held planning goal, Constitution Plaza is now connected to the river's edge via a new (also elevated) pedestrian space that crosses over (a vastly reconfigured) Interstate 91 to a large waterfront amphitheater and walkways up-and-down river, and then across the Connecticut River to East Hartford.

== Architecture ==
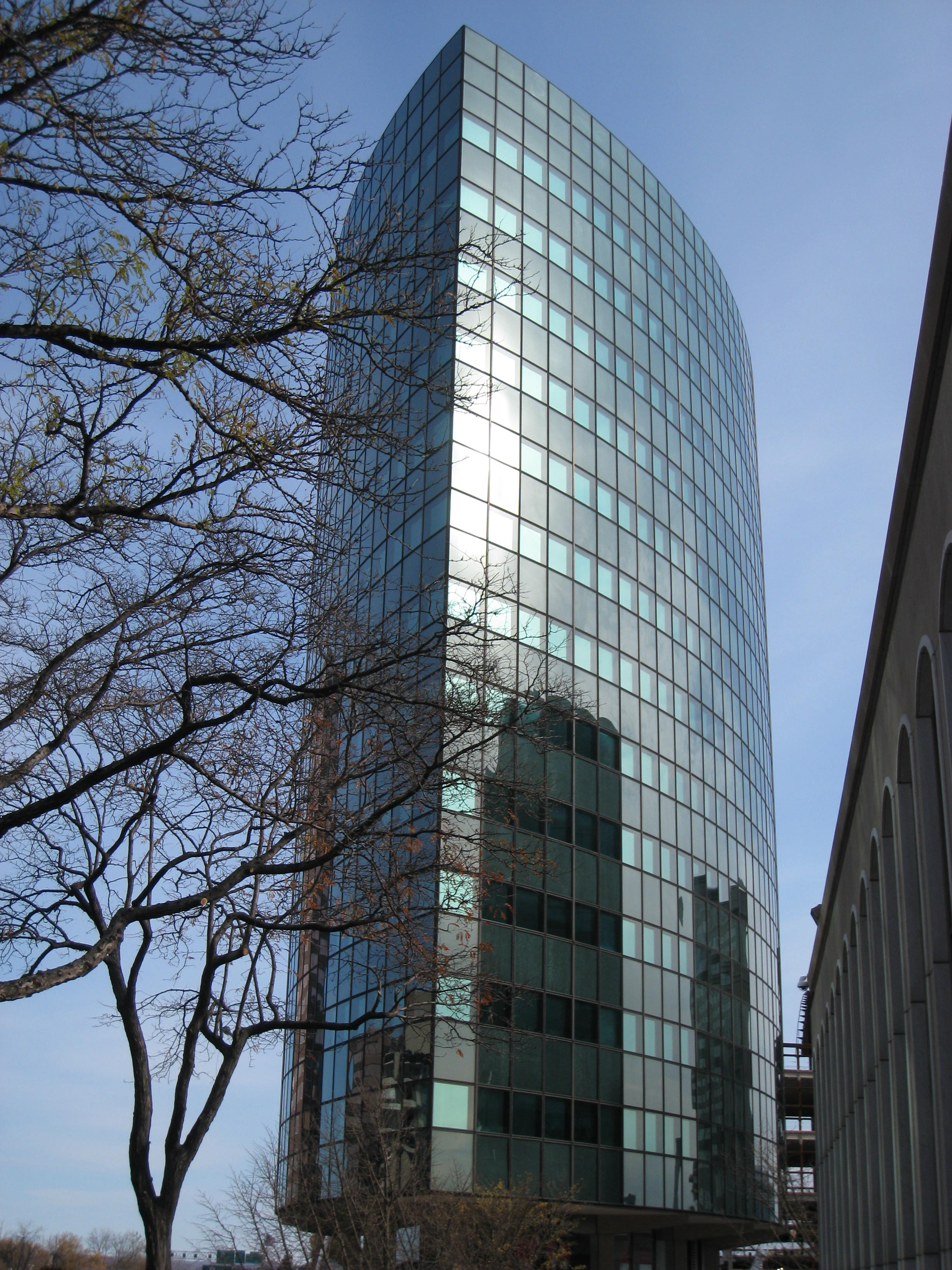
Phoenix Life Insurance Company Building

Constitution Plaza is an example of mid-twentieth-century commercial design, created as a series of projects under the overall coordination of Hartford architect Charles DuBose, which has sustained minimal alterations since it was designed. Its three largest office towers showcase various styles of glass-and-spandrel panel systems, with the glass surfaces recently replaced on both One and One Hundred Constitution Plaza with more reflective and energy-efficient systems. However, it's been noted these new window surfaces lack the character of the original dark glass and spandrel colors that gave the towers a sophisticated and more backdrop feel to the featured plaza and landscaping.

Its major buildings are:

- One Constitution Plaza (Kahn & Jacobs, 1961-1963)
- 100 Constitution Plaza (Charles DuBose, 1961)
- 200 Constitution Plaza (Charles DuBose 1963)
- 250 Constitution Plaza (Charles DuBose, 1962-1963)
- Phoenix Life Insurance Company Building (Harrison & Abramovitz, 1962-1964)

Of particular note is the blue-green glass, two-sided Phoenix Life Insurance Company Building. Referred to locally as "the boat building", especially when viewed at its two bowed "corners", it is the largest and last of the plaza's original tenants and is regarded as the signature building of Constitution Plaza, and considered one of Connecticut's finest modern architectural treasures. For many years, its claim to trivia has been that it is the only "two-sided building" in the world. In addition to that, the Connecticut Science Center & Conference Center is adjacent to Constitution Plaza with Adrien's landing and walkway to East Hartford, Connecticut.

A significant loss was the demolition of the landmark 'Broadcast House' building which sat the SE corner of the Plaza at State and Commerce Street, and was the first building completed at Constitution Plaza in 1961. Vacated in 2007 and demolished in 2009, it was the long-time home of local CBS affiliate station, WFSB-TV who moved to a new building in the suburb of Rocky Hill in mid-2007. 'Broadcast House' was originally constructed for the Travelers Insurance Company's own WTIC-AM-FM-TV until they sold their broadcasting division to different owners in March 1974. The four story, square structure sat partially below plaza level and was noted for its cantilevered, waffle-like roof parapet. It also featured a roof garden in the center of the forth level which was for its executive offices. The Broadcast House site has been vacant for over 13 years.

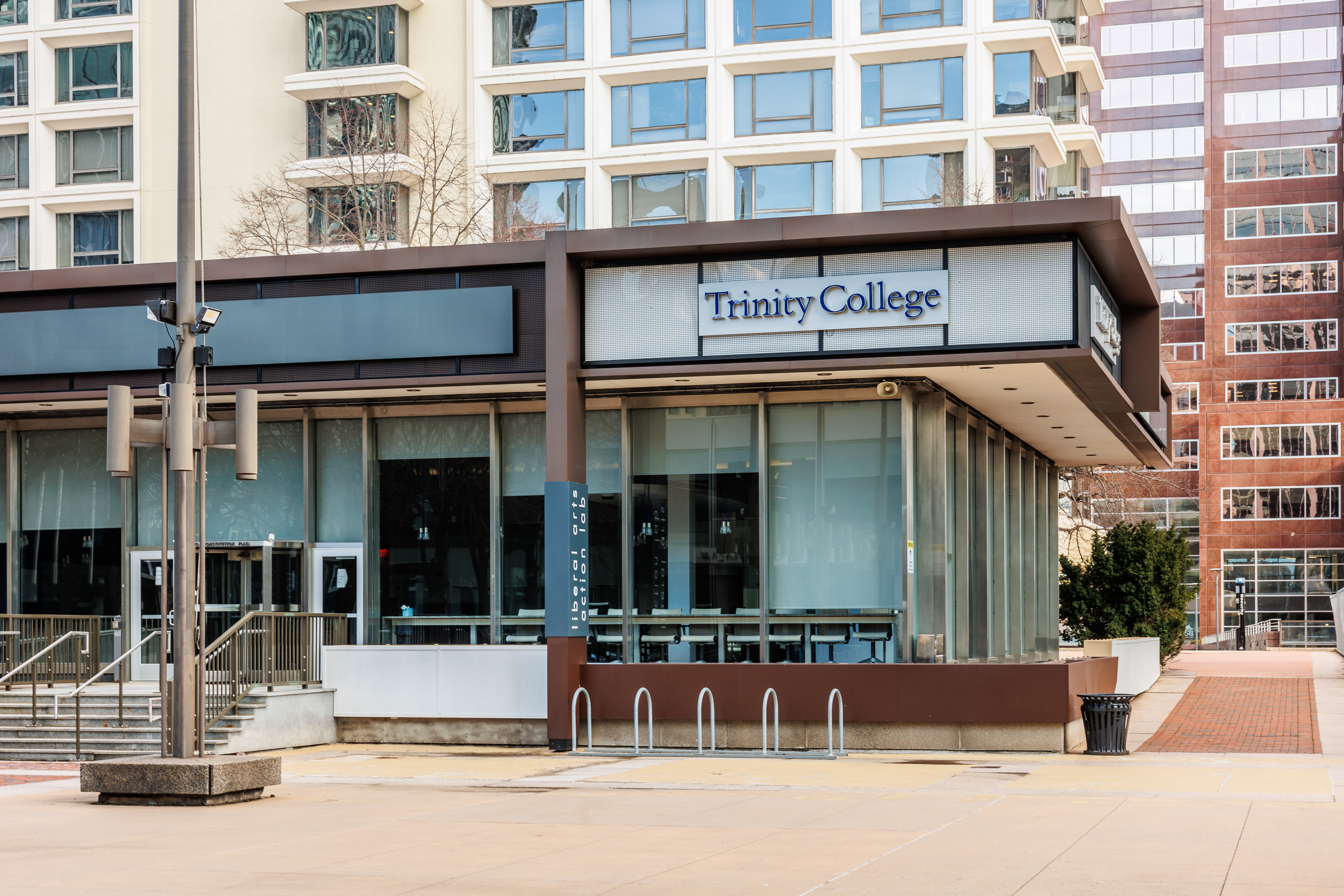
Trinity College's Liberal Arts Action Lab in Constitution Plaza

A freestanding pavilion structure on the plaza level was programmed to be a restaurant, but was used as office space for most of its history. This quirk was due to city fire codes that did not allow for issuance of an occupancy permit, since the structure did not exit directly onto an actual street. The building later housed a television studio for The Gayle King Show, a popular Italian restaurant and television studios for a fledging golf network. In February 2020 the pavilion, along with parts of One Constitution Plaza, were acquired by Trinity College as part of its downtown Hartford "Trinity Innovation Hub."

Other structures include a U-shaped (former) retail court at its northern end, which was altered in the mid 1980s with a new five-level office complex 'piggybacked' on its eastern side that once housed Travelers Insurance Company's Training Center, which is now vacant. At first, it contained such upmarket specialty stores as Brentano's bookstore, Peck & Peck, and a branch of W & J Sloane furniture. Also built was a 12-story, 300-room hotel that originally opened as Hotel America in April 1964. The hotel was later operated for almost twenty years as an upscale Sonesta Hotel property, then finally as a Clarion hotel before closing in the mid-1990s. The property was then owned by an investment group tied to religious order, several recent renovation attempts have been thwarted, due in large part to the high asking sale price for the property. After sitting empty for nearly a decade, the building reopened as luxury apartments known as Spectra in 2015.

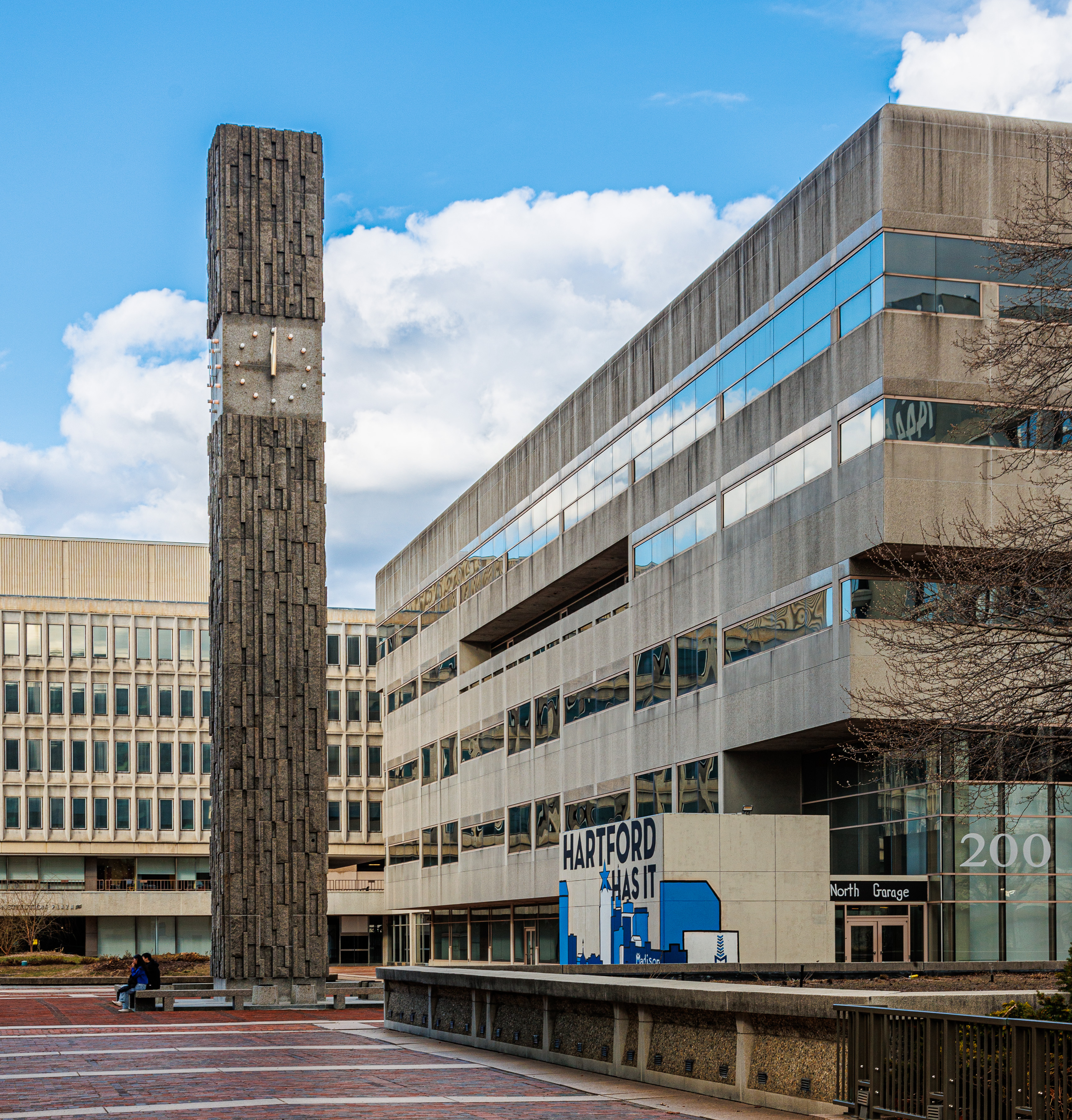
Kinoshita's clock tower, and 200 Constitution Plaza

Tying all these buildings together are large pedestrian spaces and overstreet bridges with walkways and paved areas, planter beds with landscaping, large potted trees, a modernist clock tower, reflecting pools and fountains designed by landscape architect Masao Kinoshita. The entire plaza area sits atop a 1,600-car, multi-level parking garage.

Viewed as a period design ensemble, it is a handsome if austere complex. A precursor to later megastructure and now more integrated mixed-use complexes, its construction was heralded as the future of urban design. However, considering recent trends that emphasize more traditional streetscapes, this self-contained urban environment seems outdated. It shares its design "brotherhood" of multiple-style buildings connected by large, above-grade pedestrian spaces with two similar but much larger renewal projects, Charles Center in downtown Baltimore, Maryland, and the Prudential Center (Boston) complex in Boston, Massachusetts, although these two developments have been significantly altered (The Prudential Center was mostly converted to an enclosed mall in the early 1990s) and have also experienced varying degrees of economic and planning success.

Often viewed as a classic example of the fallibility of urban renewal, Constitution Plaza was for many of its early years a well-celebrated aesthetic and economic success, as it stabilized the initial decline of the downtown business district, and in combination with the later PeoplesBank Arena complex, sparked a modest downtown revival and office building boom that began in the mid-1970s. From the 1980s through the mid-2000s and through multiple ownerships, the mergers/demise and eventual vacating of most of the anchor corporate tenants, and Hartford's sharp economic decline which took hold in the early 1990s, it has called into question the Plaza's long-term viability without significant re-investment and maintenance.

A foreclosure proceeding for the complex was approved in 2024. The complex was subsequently placed for sale in 2026.

== Events at the plaza ==
Constitution Plaza was the site of many annual public events, such as the popular Festival of Lights during the holiday season (which has since been relocated in a scaled-down form to nearby Bushnell Park), and a number of concerts and sing-alongs. In its earlier years, it hosted several outdoor Easter Sunday services and the Taste of Hartford food festival.
