= The Plaza Hotel Columbus at Capitol Square =

Highrise hotel in Downtown Columbus, Ohio

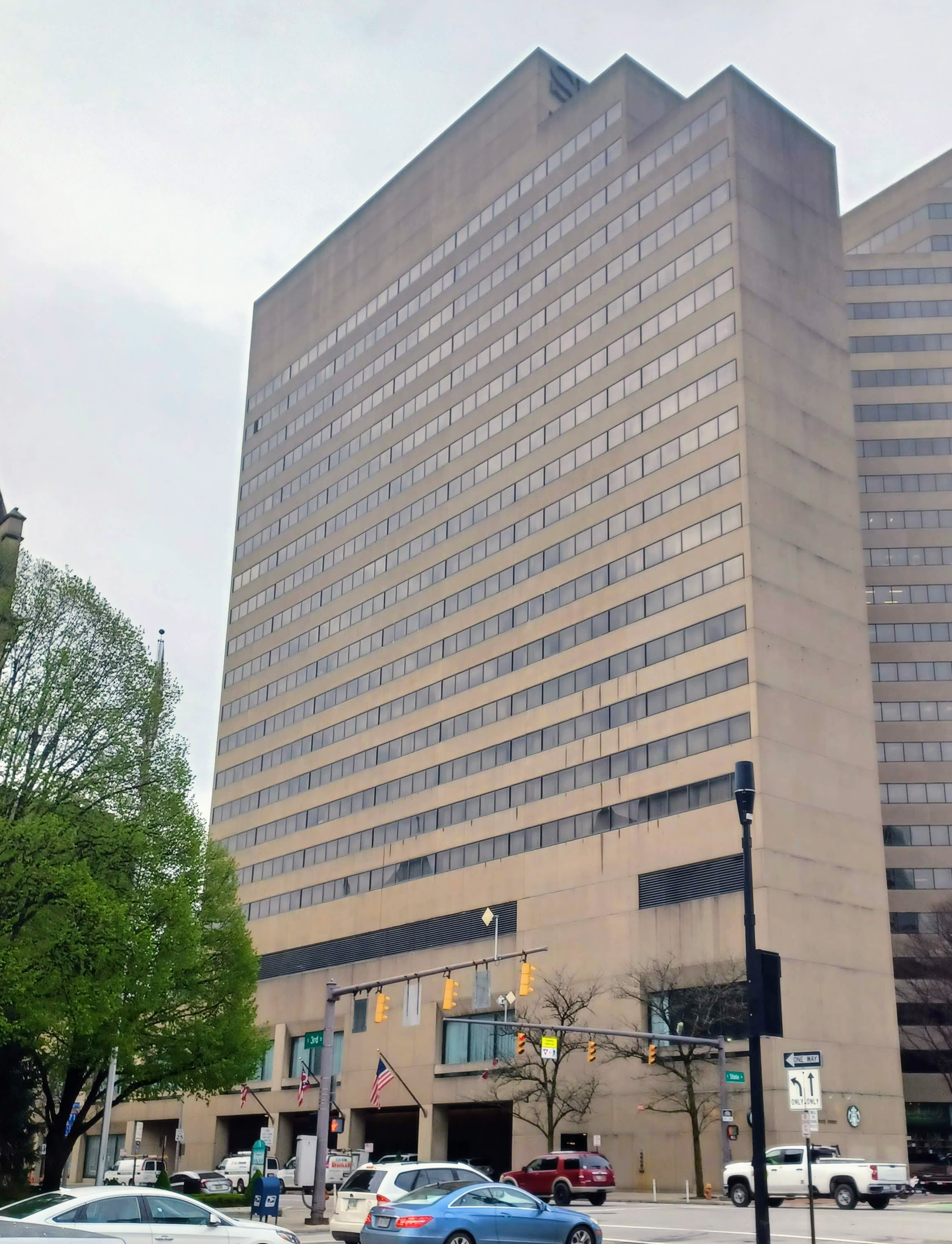
- Interactive map of the The Plaza Hotel Columbus at Capitol Square area

General information
- Type: Hotel
- Location: 75 East State Street, Columbus, Ohio
- Coordinates: 39.960031°N 82.997808°W
- Completed: 1984

Height
- Roof: 249 ft (76 m)

Technical details
- Floor count: 21

The Plaza Hotel Columbus at Capitol Square is a high-rise hotel on Capitol Square in Downtown Columbus, Ohio. The hotel was constructed along with the Capitol Square skyscraper in the 1980s. The site was formerly home to the Hartman Building and Theater.

== History ==
The hotel opened on January 16, 1984 as the Hyatt on Capitol Square. It was constructed along with the Capitol Square skyscraper on the site of the Hartman Building and Hartman Theatre, as part of the Capitol South redevelopment.

The Hyatt was purchased out of receivership on July 7, 2011 by Driftwood Hospitality Management for $19.5 million. They converted the property to the Sheraton Columbus Hotel at Capitol Square and undertook a year-long $9.5 million renovation, completed in January 2013.

In 2016, The Plascensia Group sold the hotel to Schulte Hospitality Group.

In 2023, the hotel was auctioned off, selling for $9.6 million to Dallas-based hotelier Joshua Joseph.

In 2024, the hotel left Sheraton and was renamed The Plaza Hotel Columbus at Capitol Square.

== Gallery ==
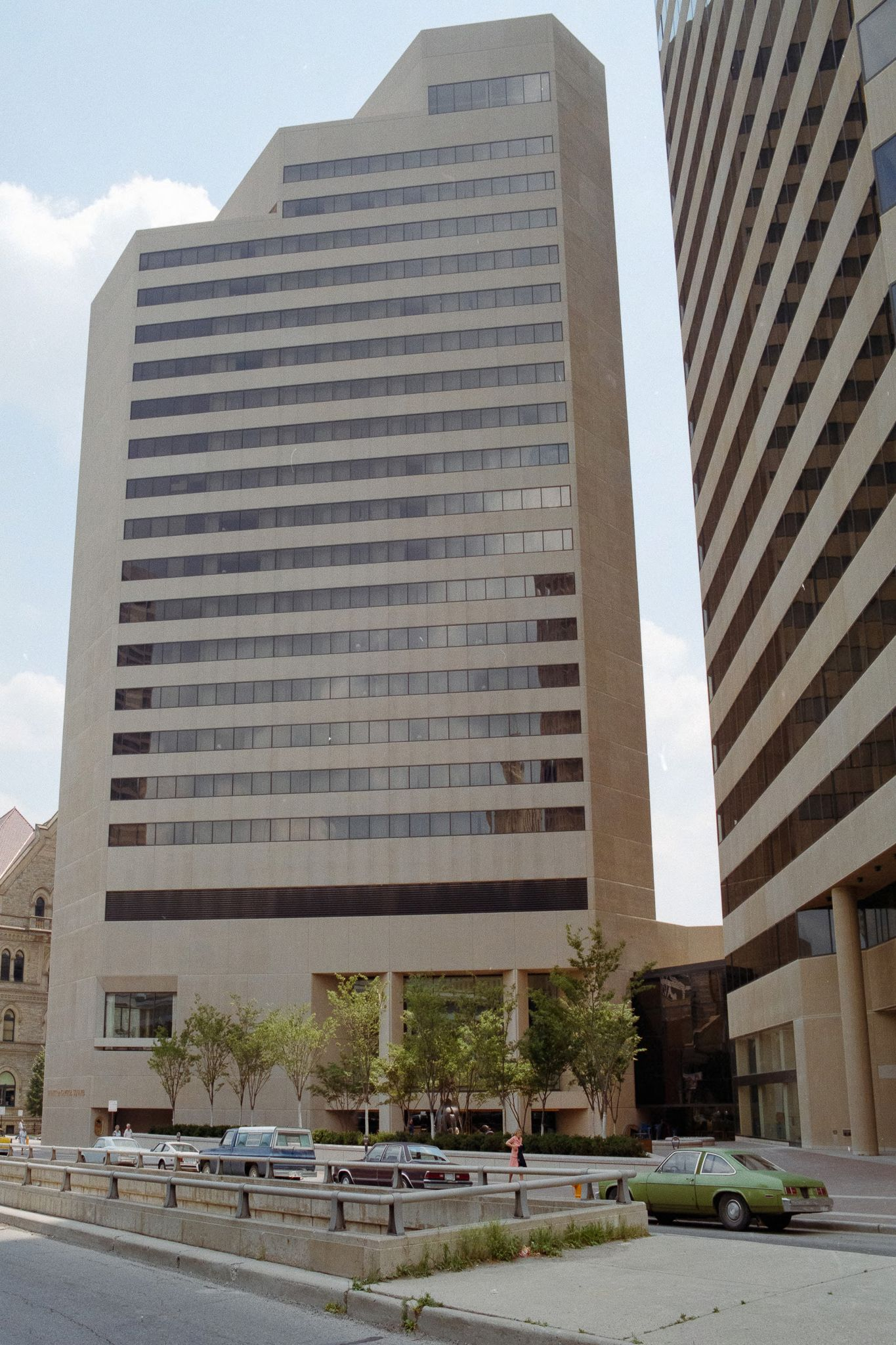
The hotel's State Street facade, 1984

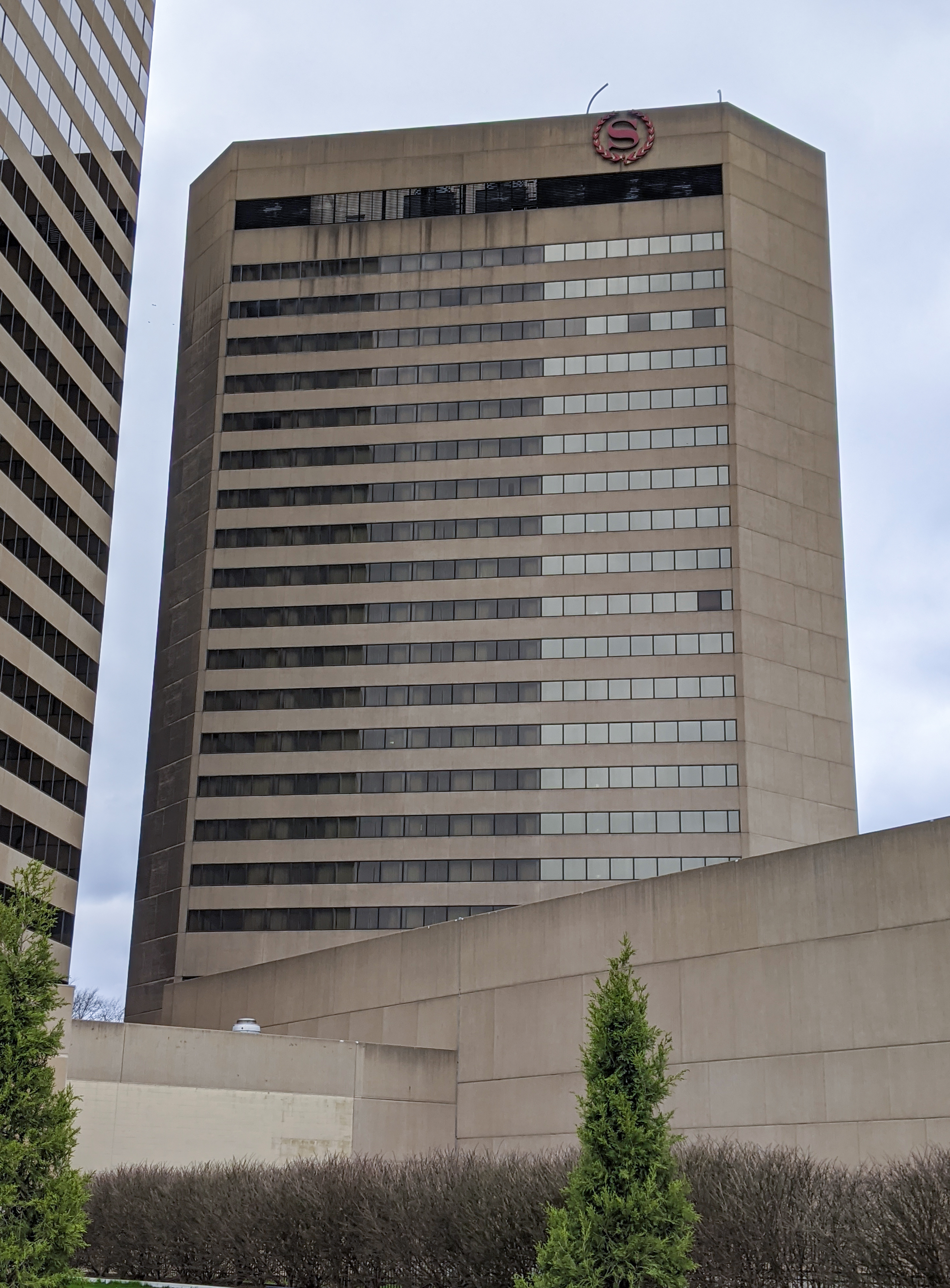
The rear of the hotel

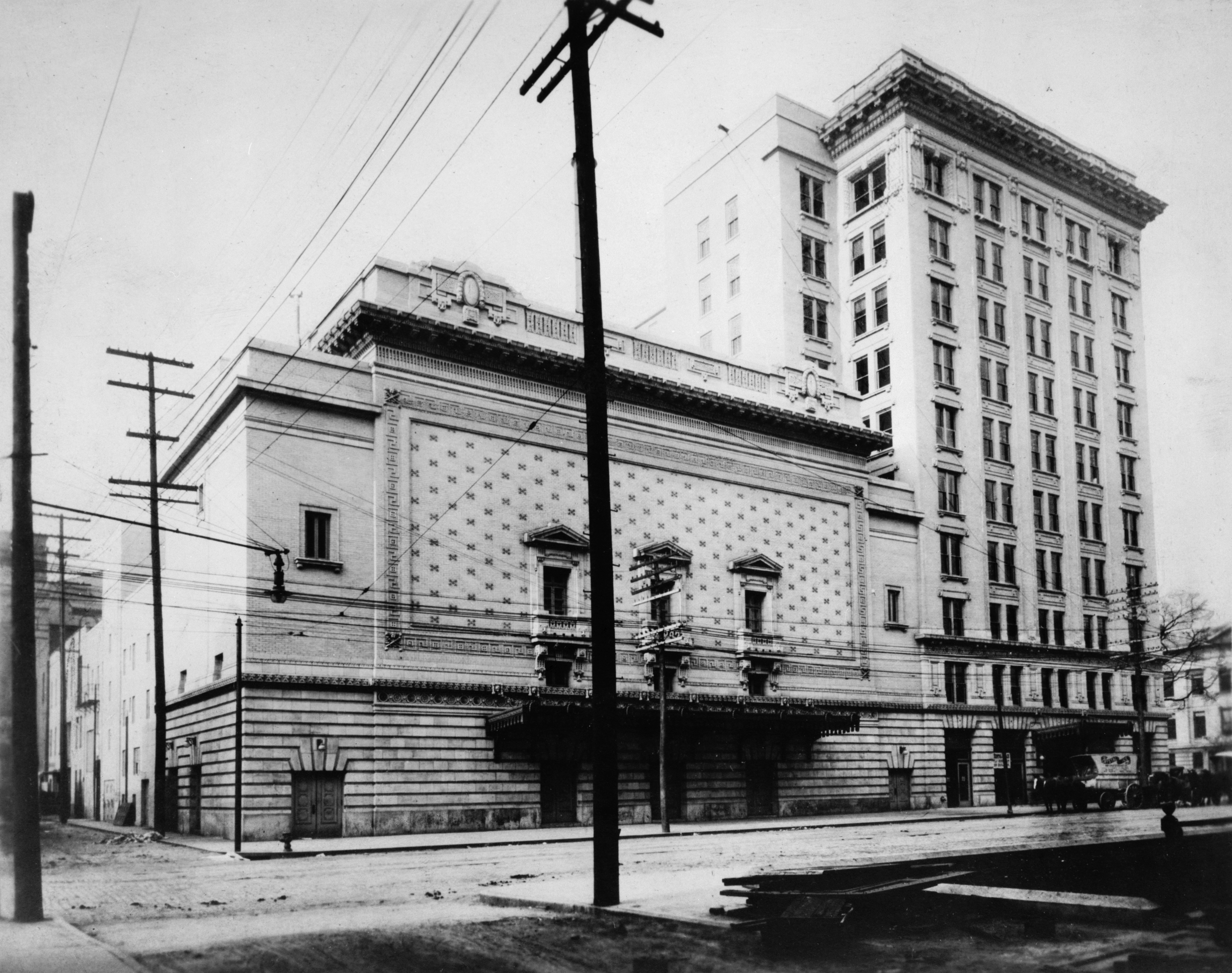
Hartman Building and Theater
