= Yoshikuni Araki =

Japanese garden designer and architect

Yoshikuni Araki (荒木芳邦, Araki Yoshikuni; 1921–1997) was a Japanese garden designer, garden architect, landscape gardener, landscape architect, and garden creator, who was known for his Japanese-style gardens. Araki was born in Osaka and graduated from the Tokyo Landscaping School (which later became the School of Landscape Architecture at the Tokyo University of Agriculture). Araki trained in landscape design and construction under Sentaro Iwaki in Tokyo.

== Selected works ==
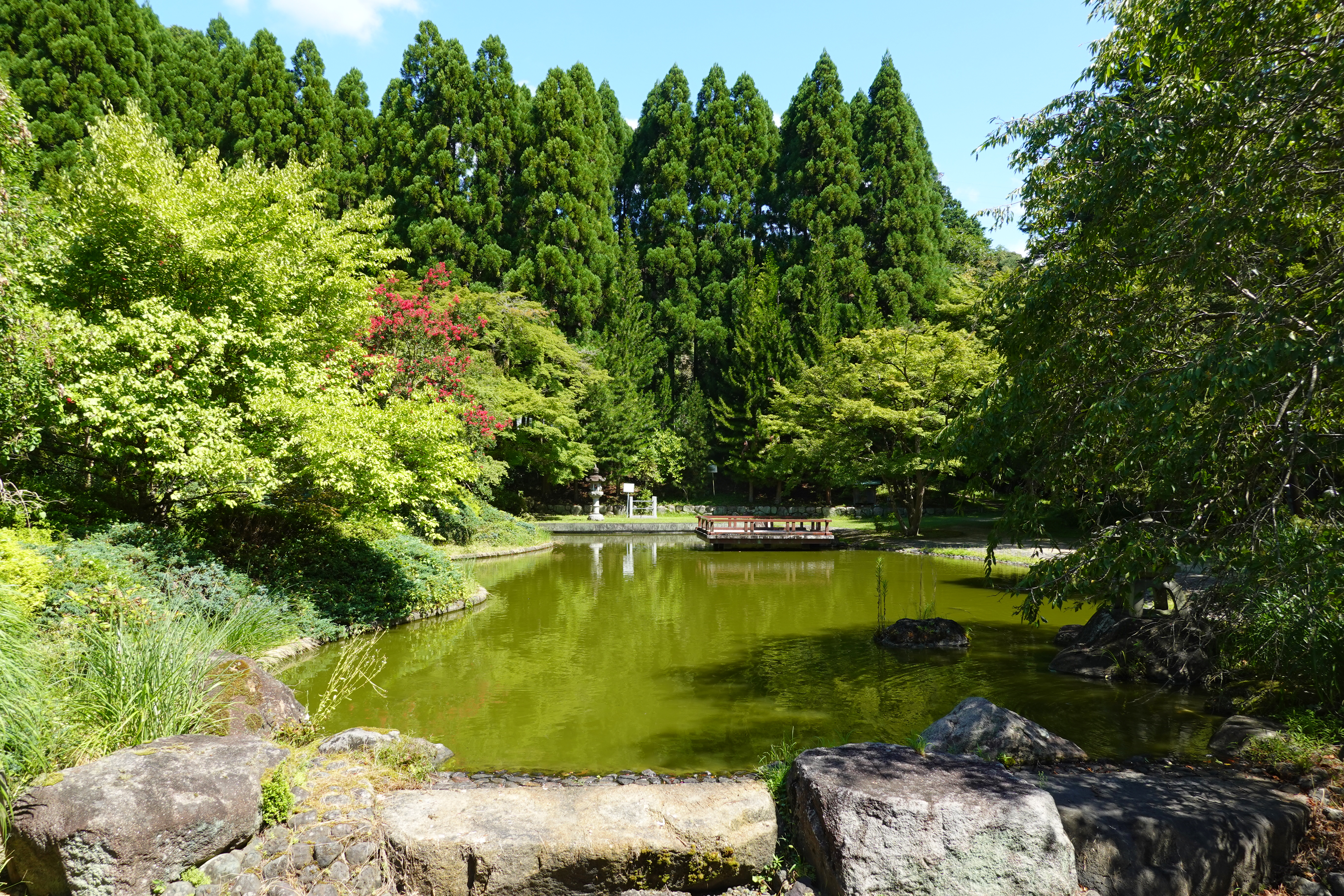
Koku-en garden of Kyuan-ji in Ikeda, Osaka

Major works in Japan

- Tokyo Marine and Fire Insurance Company Building, Limited outside this space
- Katsuō-ji improved garden
- Sekikawa House Garden
- Kanketsusen in Higashi Yūenchi of Kobe
- The extracellular space, Shinjuku NS Building
- Otani Memorial Art Museum Nishinomiya City, The garden of renewal
- Koku-en garden of Kyuan-ji in Ikeda, Osaka
- Ikebukuro Subcenter redevelopment (Central Park of Higashi-Ikebukuro, Sunshine 60 Building green space)
- Japanese garden of the American consulate in Kobe

and many others

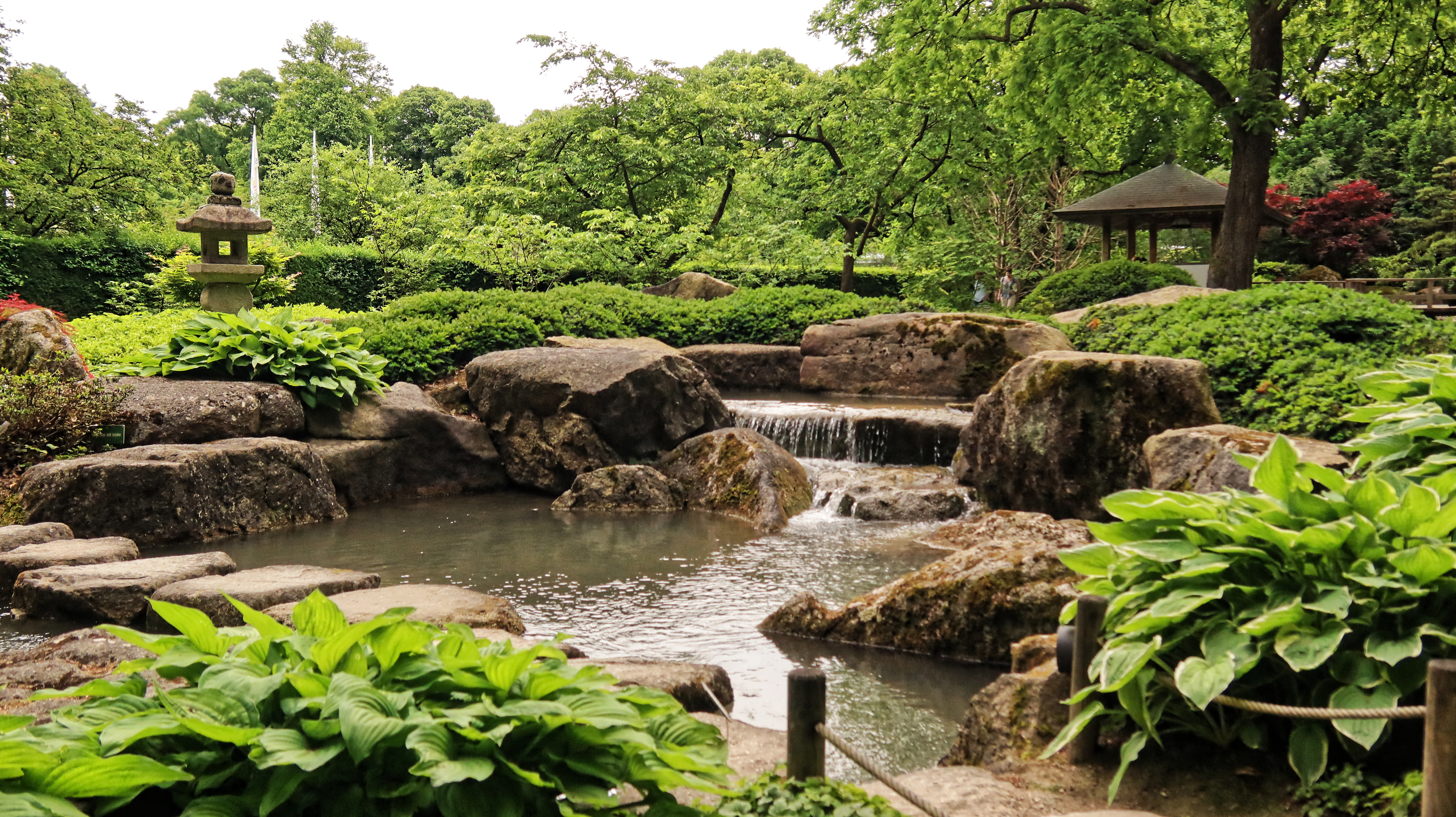
Japanischer Garten in Augsburg, Germany

Major works in the world

- Embassy of Japan in Bangkok, Thailand
- Japanese garden of the residence of the Japanese ambassador in South Korea
- Japanese garden of the residence of the Japanese ambassador in Washington DC, United States
- Waterfall Garden Park in Seattle, Washington, United States
- Japanischer Garten in Augsburg, Germany
- Japanese garden of Planten un Blomen in Hamburg, Germany
- Japanese Garden of National Botanical Garden of Cuba in Havana, Cuba
- Araki designed gardens at the Royal Hotel Osaka in a series of landscape design landscaping planning, work planning, which was the winner of a designing award winning Japanese Institute of Landscape Architecture department.
- Parks and Open Space Association of Japan Kitamura Award 15th in 1993

== Bibliography ==
- Tribute to Dr. Yoshikuni Araki, Keiji Uehara Prize winner 1997 (15 th Prize winner Keiji Uehara-person interview), Kimio Kondo, Washio KimuWataru, Journal of the Japanese Institute of Landscape Architecture Institute of Landscape 61 (4), 357-358, 1998-03-27, url - https://ci.nii.ac.jp/naid/110004305861
