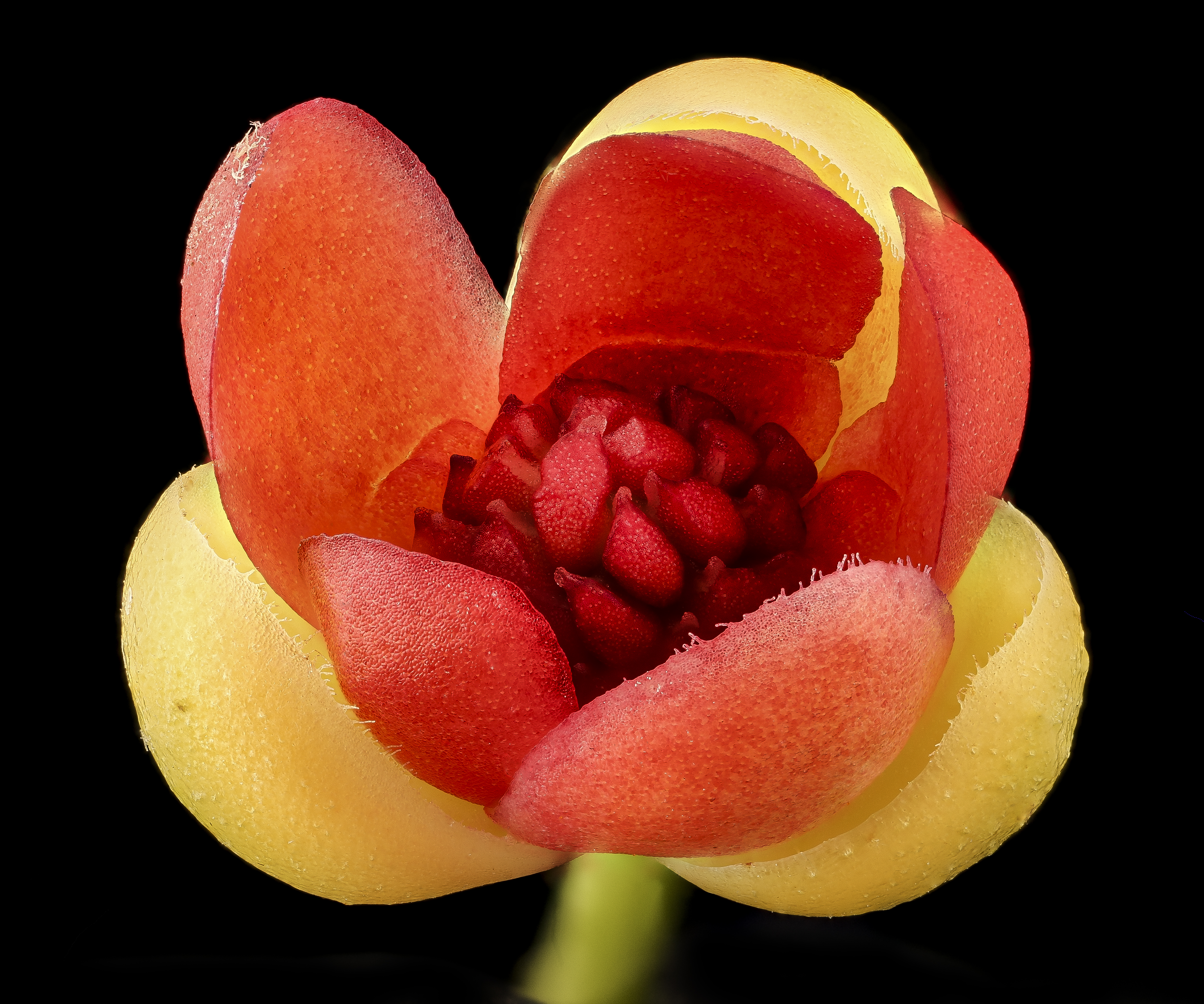
- Schisandra glabra flower

Conservation status
- Vulnerable (NatureServe)

Scientific classification
- Kingdom: Plantae
- Clade: Tracheophytes
- Clade: Angiosperms
- Order: Austrobaileyales
- Family: Schisandraceae
- Genus: Schisandra
- Species: S. glabra

Binomial name
- Schisandra glabra (Brickell) Rehder 1944

Synonyms
- Schisandra coccinea Michx.; Stellandria glabra Brickell 1803; Schizandra coccinea Michx.

= Schisandra glabra =

Species of flowering plant

Schisandra glabra, the bay star-vine, is the only American species of the predominantly Asian genus Schisandra. It is native to the southeastern United States and northern Mexico. It grows in Louisiana, eastern Arkansas, southwestern Tennessee, Mississippi, Alabama, northwestern Florida, and Georgia, with isolated populations in Kentucky, South Carolina, North Carolina, and Hidalgo. Despite its wide range, it is considered a vulnerable species. Few populations are secure due to competition from invasive species (such as Japanese honeysuckle) and habitat loss.

Schisandra glabra is a trailing or twining woody vine sometimes climbing to a height of 20 m (67 feet) or more. Leaves are elliptic to cordate (heart-shaped), up to 13 cm (5.2 inches) long. The plant is monoecious, with staminate (male, pollen-producing) and pistillate (female, seed-producing) flowers separate on the same plant. Sepals are whitish, petals pink or red. Berries are red, spherical to ellipsoid, up to 15 mm (0.6 inches) long. It can be found in wooded bluffs, hillsides and ravines at elevations less than 500 m (1650 feet).

Some sources spell the name Schizandra, while others use the now-rejected name Stellandria. Schisandra is the accepted spelling.
