= Alexander AEP Park =

Park in Columbus, Ohio, U.S.

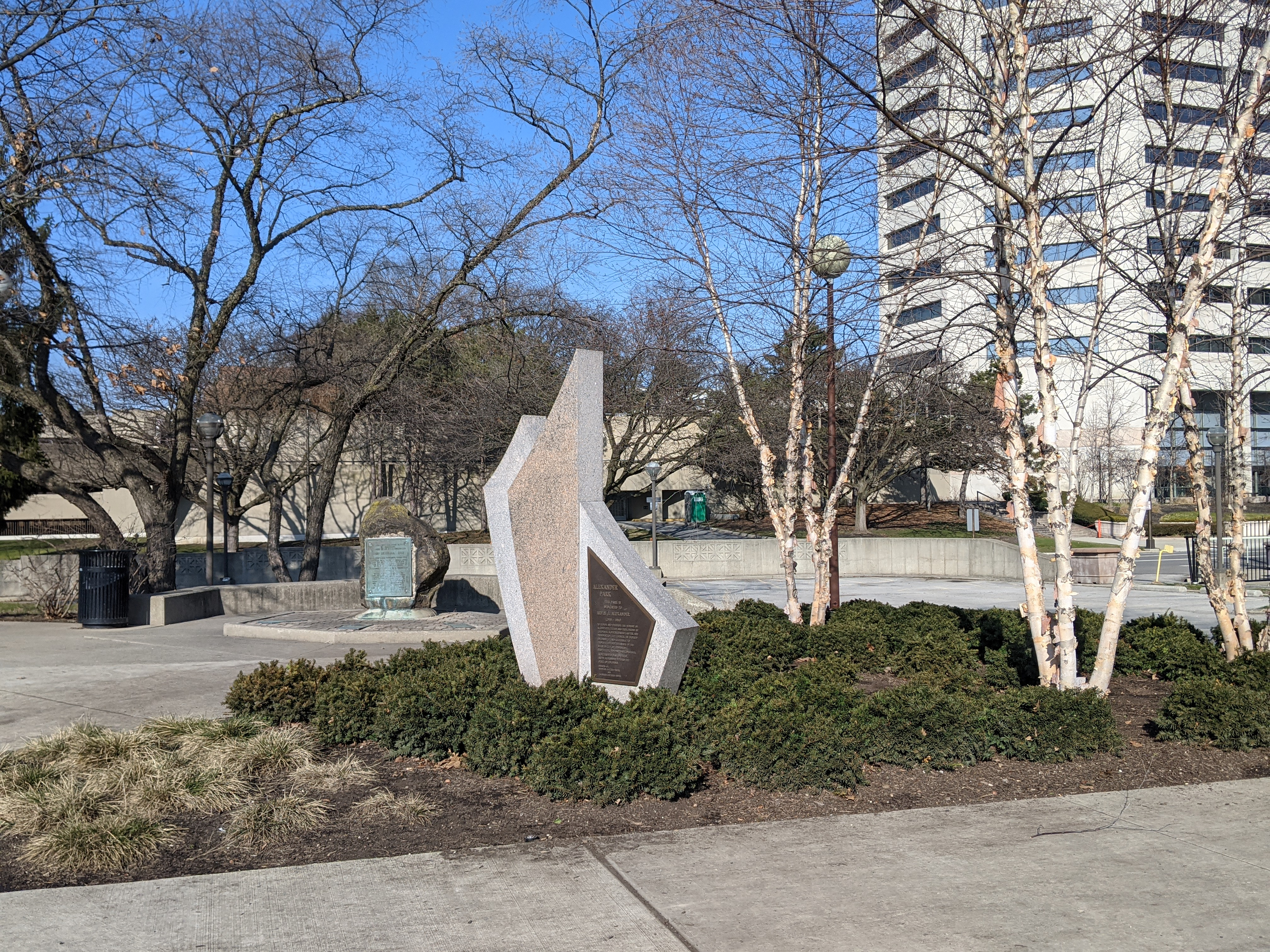
- The Arvin J. Alexander Memorial and Brickell Memorial in the park
- Interactive map of the park among others on the Scioto Mile
- Coordinates: 39°57′52″N 83°00′26″W
- Administrator: Columbus Recreation and Parks Department
- Public transit: 4, 5, 7, 11; CoGo
- Website: Official website

Alexander Park, or Alexander AEP Park, is a park in Columbus, Ohio, United States. Donated by American Electric Power, the park is located between Battelle Riverfront Park and North Bank Park. It is named after former City Council President Arvin J. Alexander and features a 1991 memorial in his honor by Carl Faehnle. The park also features a plaque marking the site of the city's first cabin, completed by John Brickell in 1797.

== See also ==
- List of parks in Columbus, Ohio
