= James W. Barney Pickaweekee Story Grove =

Sculpture series in Columbus, Ohio, U.S.

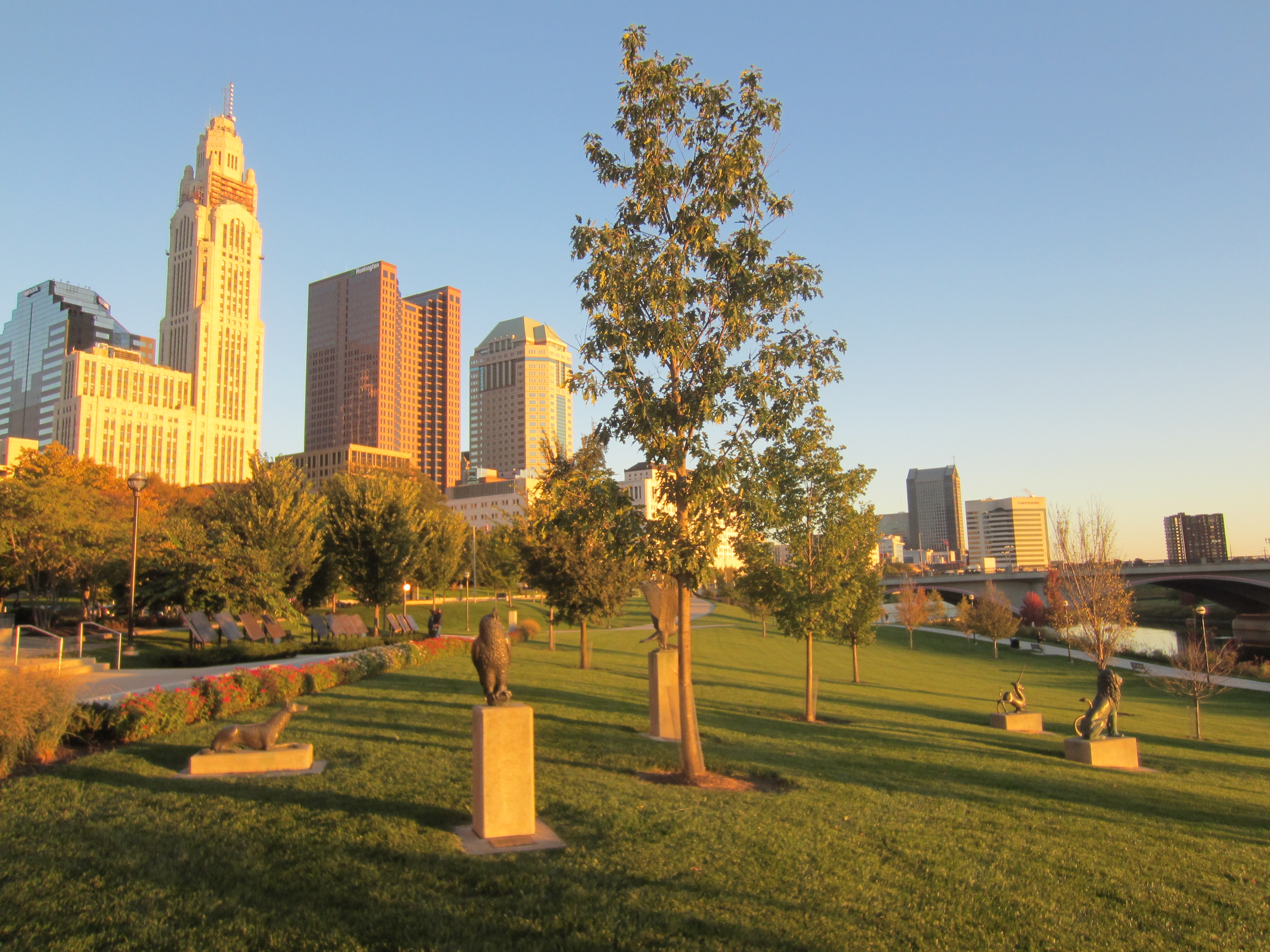
- Completion date: 1992; 34 years ago (created); 2015; 11 years ago (at this locatoon)
- Medium: Bronze sculpture
- Subject: Animals
- Location: Columbus, Ohio, U.S.
- 39°57′48″N 83°0′20″W

The James W. Barney Pickaweekee Story Grove features a series of six bronze sculptures by Jack Greaves, installed in Columbus, Ohio's Battelle Riverfront Park, in the United States.

== Description and history ==
The artworks were completed in 1992 for the Christopher Columbus Quincentenary Jubilee celebrations. The grove is named after Jim Barney, who was the director of the Columbus Recreation and Parks Department, and the sculptures were relocated to their current location in 2015.

The figures, sometimes collectively referred to as Children's Fountain, KidSpeak Children's Fountain, or Pickaweekee Children's Fountain, include Eagle, Griffin, Hound, Lion, Owl, and Unicorn.

The sculptures were designed for a children's park, located just south of the Joseph P. Kinneary U.S. Courthouse. The park was themed after S. J. Seaburn's mythical story, "Pickaweekee, A Myth of Discovery", with a set of trees representing an enchanted forest, among a fountain, waterfall, and meandering stream. During the Scioto Mile renovations, the space was redesigned, and the statues were moved a short distance northwest, to their current place. The Scioto River and a nearby young tree stand in for the story in the present day.

The group's owl sculpture, valued at $35,250, was stolen in 2009.

== See also ==
- 1992 in art
- List of public art in Columbus, Ohio
