= Alfred Tibor =

Hungarian-American sculptor (1920–2017)

- Alternative name: Alfred Goldstein
- Born: February 10, 1920 Konyár, Kingdom of Hungary
- Died: March 18, 2017 (aged 97) Bexley, Ohio, U.S.

Gymnastics career
- Discipline: Men's artistic gymnastics

Alfred Tibor (February 10, 1920 – March 18, 2017) was a Holocaust survivor and sculptor. His artwork can be found in nearly 500 private collections and museums throughout the world, including the Yad Vashem memorial in Jerusalem.

== Life ==
Tibor was born Alfred Goldstein in Konyár, Kingdom of Hungary, in 1920.

Denied formal training because of his Jewish faith, he taught himself gymnastics in high school. "The more they were pushing me down and degrading me, the more I wanted to be better than others," he said. "I wanted to prove it: I am not a dirty Jew; I am a boy, and I have ambition." Tibor eventually qualified for the Hungarian team for the 1936 Summer Olympics, but when he went to register for the team, he was denied when the team discovered he was Jewish. Tibor was not allowed to compete as a member of the Hungarian team in the 1936 Summer Olympics in Berlin. "I was kicked out. I was kicked out because I was Jewish," Tibor said. "That time, the sky was falling apart."

In 1940 Tibor was forced to be a slave laborer for a Hungarian Army labor battalion. Eventually he was captured by the Soviet Army and spent six years as a prisoner in a Siberian prison camp. Of the 273 men in his labor battalion sent to the prisoner-of-war camp, he was only one of two to survive. Tibor credited "luck and determination" for his survival.

Tibor was freed from the camp in 1947. It was then that he discovered that, of his family of 37 immediate people (and 82 other relatives), only he and his brother Andre had survived both the Holocaust and the war. Tibor and his brother changed their last name to Tibor to honor their older brother, Tibor Goldstein, who was executed in another prison camp.

Tibor moved to Budapest and worked for nine years as a government exhibition designer. In 1956, two months after the Hungarian Revolution, he fled the country with his wife and two children because he feared a return of anti-Semitic sentiment. They emigrated to the United States in 1957, where he worked as a commercial artist in Miami for 16 years until moving to Columbus, Ohio, to pursue sculpture full-time.

Tibor's grand-niece Julie Orringer based her first novel The Invisible Bridge on the experiences of Tibor and his family, with Tibor's brother Andrew being the model for the book's central character.

On January 25, 2005, a deer burst through Tibor's living-room window and attacked him, resulting in his hospitalization.

Tibor died on March 18, 2017, aged 97.

== Sculptures ==
Tibor has stated that be believes he did not lose his life during the Holocaust and World War II so he could eventually create art to capture and evoke human emotions. "Art for art’s sake is not enough," he has said.

Tibor's first commissioned sculpture was completed in 1974. Today his work can now be found in nearly 500 private collections and museums while his large outdoor statues can be seen in Ohio and around the world. Among the locations of his statues are the Yad Vashem memorial in Jerusalem, Battelle Riverfront Park (Columbus, Ohio), Trinity Lutheran Seminary (Ohio), the Ohio Governor's mansion, the Arthur James Hospital and Research Institute, and the Indianapolis Jewish Community Center in Indianapolis, Indiana. Freedom (1985) and Celebration of Life (2004) are installed in Columbus.

His most recent sculpture, "Zahor" (meaning "Remembrance" in Hebrew) was commissioned for Congregation Agudas Achim in Bexley, Ohio, where he is a member. The 9-foot-tall bronze sculpture shows German soldiers herding victims into a concentration camp gas chamber while above a survivor climbs out of the smokestack holding an Israeli flag. Behind the sculpture is a granite map showing the locations of all the concentration camps in Europe. The work also features a poem written by American poet Emma Lazarus predicting the establishment of the State of Israel.

== Awards ==
Tibor has received a lifetime achievement award from the Liturgical Art Guild, an Arts Freedom Award, and has been inducted into the Ohio Senior Citizens Hall of Fame. He also won a 2005 Ohioana Pegasus Award.
