= Freedom (Tibor) =

Sculpture in Columbus, Ohio, U.S.

- The sculpture in 2018
- Artist: Alfred Tibor
- Year: 1985
- Medium: Bronze sculpture
- Location: Columbus, Ohio, United States
- 39°57′49.1″N 83°0′21.0″W

Freedom is a 1985 bronze sculpture by Alfred Tibor, installed in Columbus, Ohio's Battelle Riverfront Park, in the United States.

== Description and history ==
The abstract sculpture, dedicated on July 4, 1985, depicts a walking figure setting a bird free. It measures approximately 15 x 6 x 5 ft., and rests on a base that measures approximately 48 x 53 x 72 in. A plaque on the base reads:

FREEDOM / "I give 'Freedom' as a gift to the / city of Columbus. Here in the / United States of America I have / become free to achieve my dreams." / Alfred Tibor / The fabrication of this statue was / made possible through the generosity / of the Taft Broadcasting Company / and its stations: / WTVN-TV6 / 610 WTVN Radio / WLQV-FM-96 / Dedicated July 4, 1985

The artwork was surveyed by the Smithsonian Institution's "Save Outdoor Sculpture!" program in 1994.
