= Their Spirits Circle the Earth =

Sculpture in Columbus, Ohio, U.S.

- The sculpture in 2018
- Artist: Jim Mason
- Year: 1987
- Location: Columbus, Ohio, United States
- 39°57′49.72″N 83°0′21.78″W

Their Spirits Circle the Earth, also known as Challenger Memorial, is an outdoor memorial and sculpture commemorating victims of the Space Shuttle Challenger disaster by Jim Mason, installed in Columbus, Ohio's Battelle Riverfront Park, in the United States.

== Description and history ==
The artwork features a brass ball with a 13.5-inch (34 cm) diameter on a granite slab, measuring approximately 3 ft. 6 in. x 1 ft. 1.5 in. x 3 ft. 6 in. The sculpture rests on a concrete base measuring approximately 4 in. x 1 ft. 4 in. x 4 ft. 2 in. An inscription on one side reads:

THEIR SPIRITS / CIRCLE / THE EARTH" / Sponsored by / The Burger King Corporation / and Their / Columbus, Ohio franchises / January 28, 1987". An inscription on a plaque reads: "Francis R. Scobee, Flight Commander / Michael J. Smith / Ronald E. McNair / Ellison S. Onizuka / Judith A. Resnik / Gregory B. Jarvis / Sharon Christa McAuliffe / They Accepted the Challenge / In memory of the courage and pioneering spirit of / the seven astronauts who perished aboard the / challenger on Jan. 28, 1986 / Designed and dedicated by the children of Columbus / Mayor Dana G. Rinehart / Jan. 28, 1987"

The memorial was surveyed by the Smithsonian Institution's "Save Outdoor Sculpture!" program in 1992.

== See also ==
- 1987 in art
