= Santa Maria Ship & Museum =

Museum ship in Columbus, Ohio

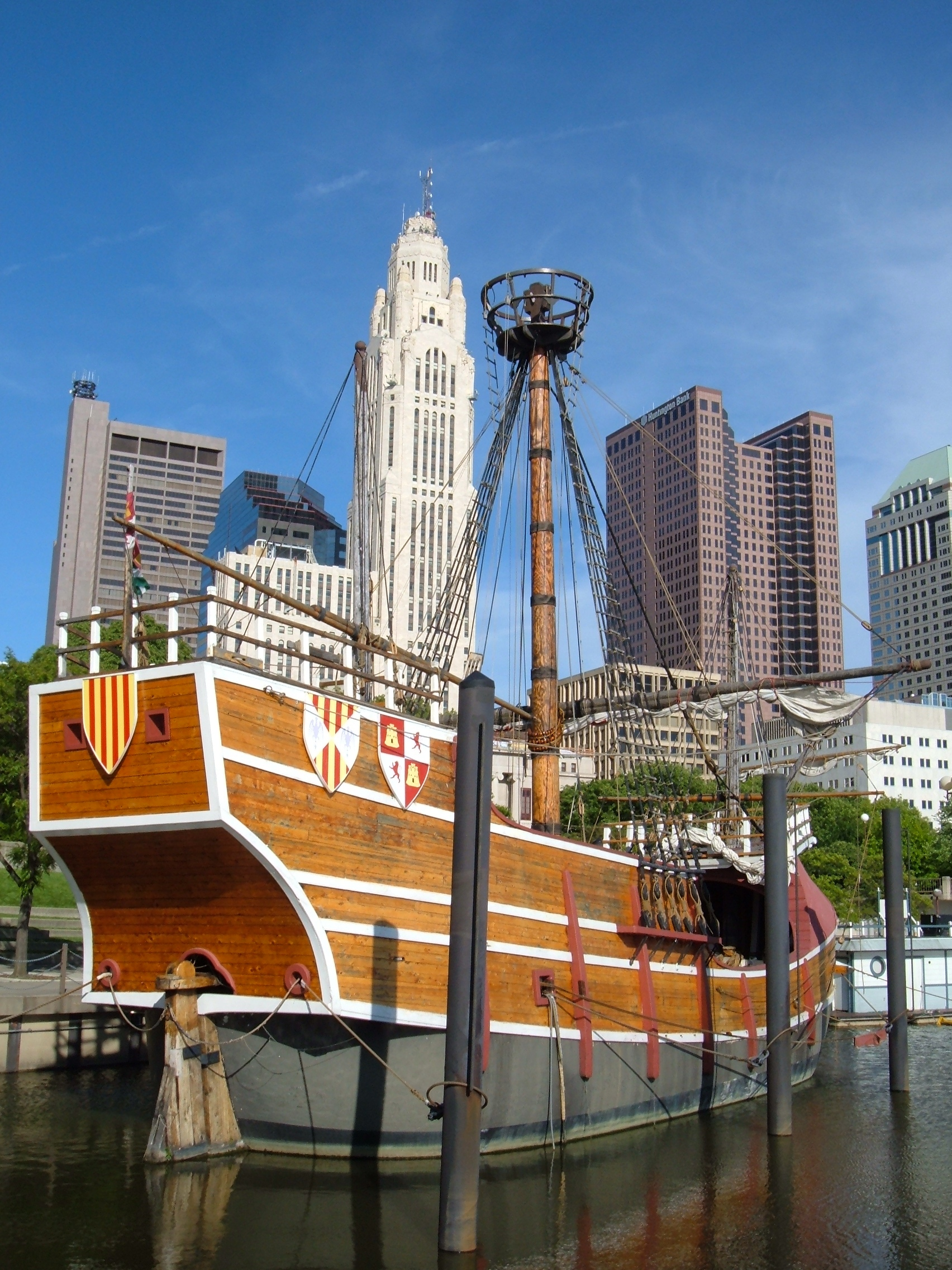
The Santa Maria in 2008

The Santa Maria Ship & Museum was a museum ship in downtown Columbus, Ohio. The craft was a full-size replica of the Santa María, one of three ships Christopher Columbus used in 1492 during his first voyage to the Americas. The ship was displayed in Columbus from 1991 to 2014, when it had to be relocated due to the Scioto Mile project reshaping the riverbanks. The Santa Maria has sat on a city-owned lot since its relocation.

== Attributes ==
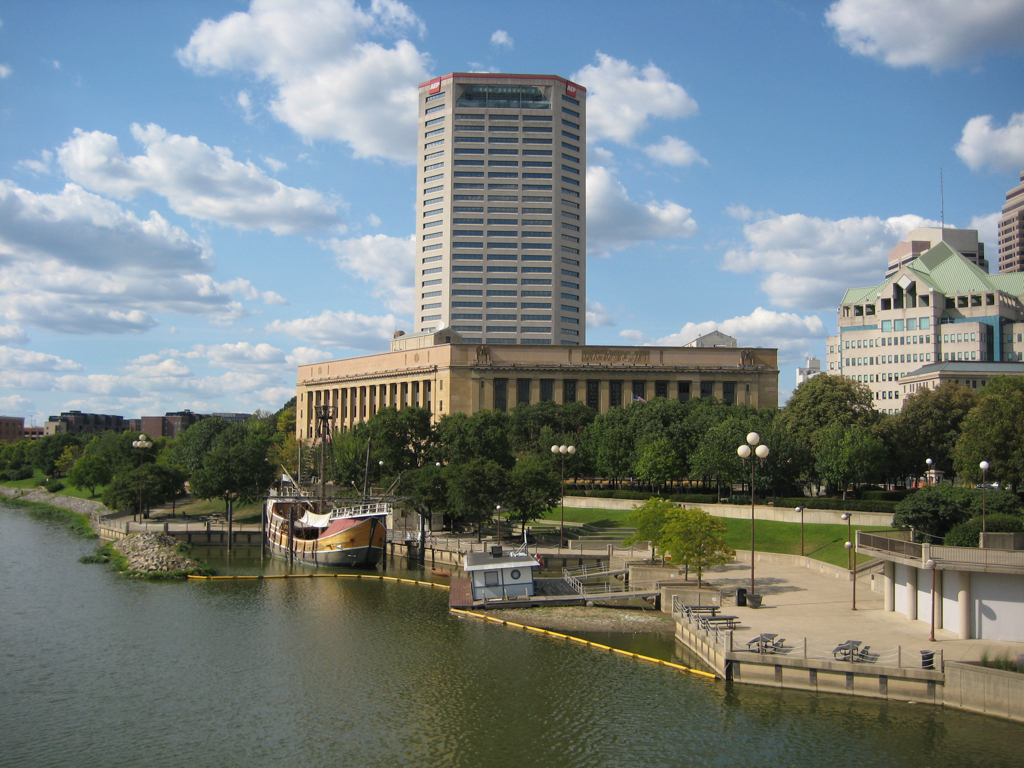
The ship on the Scioto River by Battelle Riverfront Park

The wooden craft was a full-size replica of Christopher Columbus's Santa María, one of three ships he used in his first voyage to the Americas in 1492. The new ship was believed to be the most accurate replica of the original Santa María. The ship, described by its builders as a "15th century caravel", had three masts and spanned 98 ft (30 m). The replica was displayed on the Scioto River, moored to Battelle Riverfront Park.

== History ==
The Santa Maria was commissioned in the late 1980s as a permanent riverfront attraction, in anticipation of the 1992 Christopher Columbus Quincentennial Jubilee (celebrating the 500th anniversary of Columbus's first voyage). It was built using $2 million in private funds at Scarano Boat Building in Albany, New York. It was halved and trucked into the city in 1991, reassembled in the parking lot of the Franklin County Veterans Memorial, and moved to Battelle Riverfront Park. The ship was dedicated October 11, 1991 (the Friday before Columbus Day), in time for the 1992 celebration. The event was met with about 150 protesters, including many Native Americans, both at nearby Bicentennial Park and in front of the ship.

The ship's presence was aimed to draw people to the Columbus riverfront, and drew numerous city school trips, though it overall had limited success, and attendance dropped over the years. The nonprofit tourist organization that operated it closed in 2011, and the Columbus Recreation and Parks Department inherited it. Around 2014, due to the Scioto Mile project, as well as $5–6 million in necessary repairs, the Santa Maria was taken apart into pieces and moved onto a city-owned lot beside a wastewater treatment plant in Columbus's South Side, in ten pieces. Santa Maria Inc. raised money for repairs, and it was estimated that the ship could return to the riverfront.

== Gallery ==
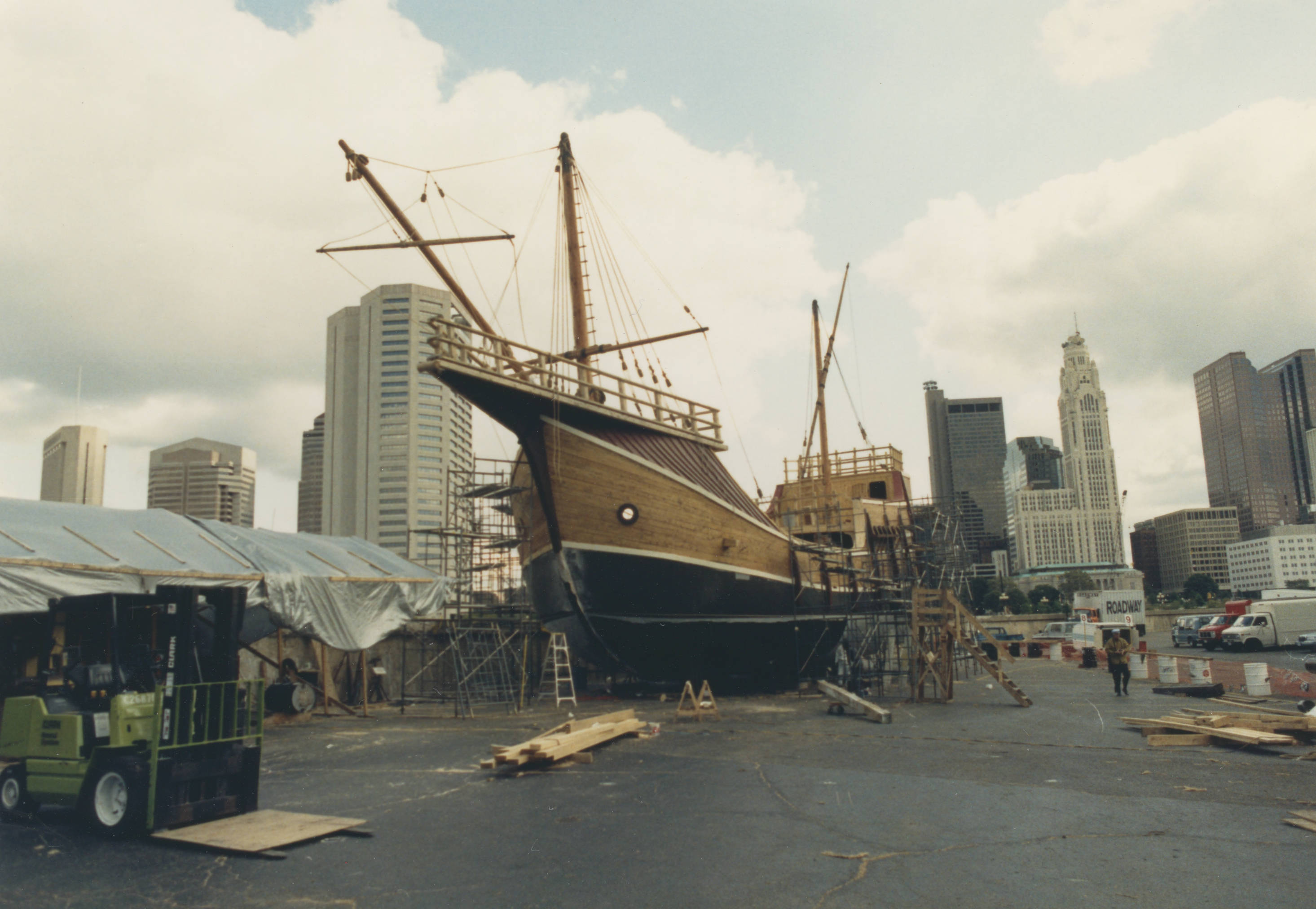
Reassembly in 1991

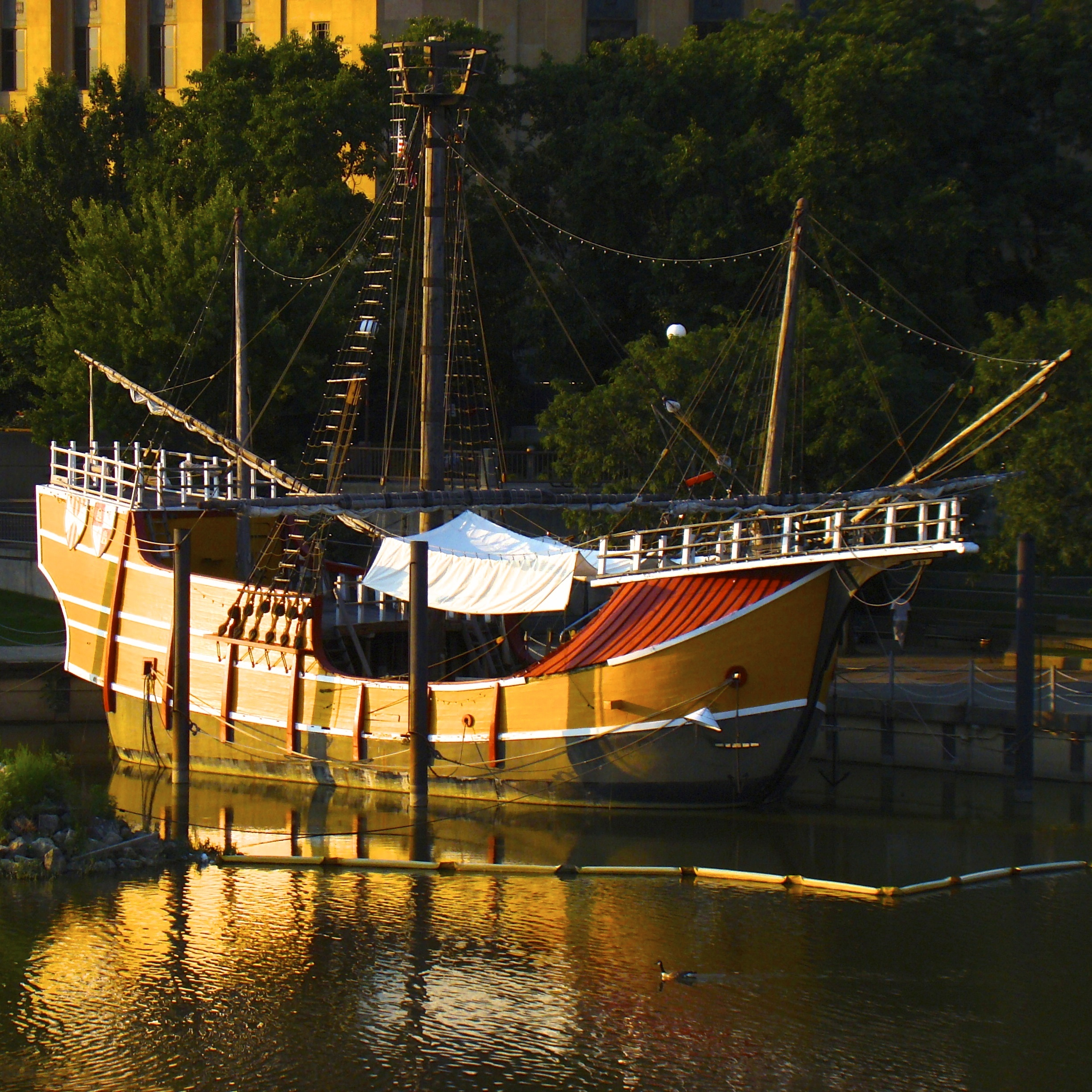
Starboard side

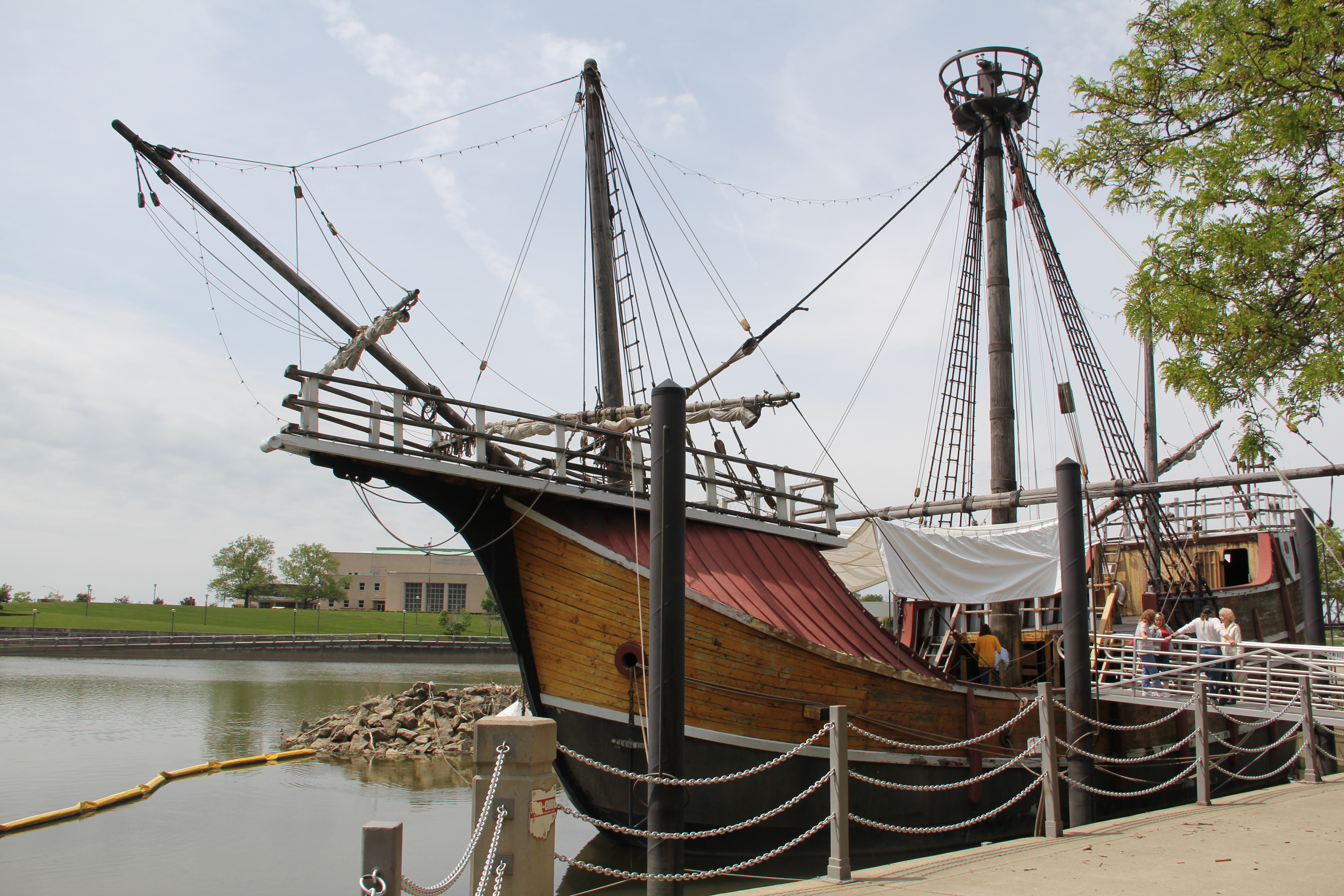
Bow

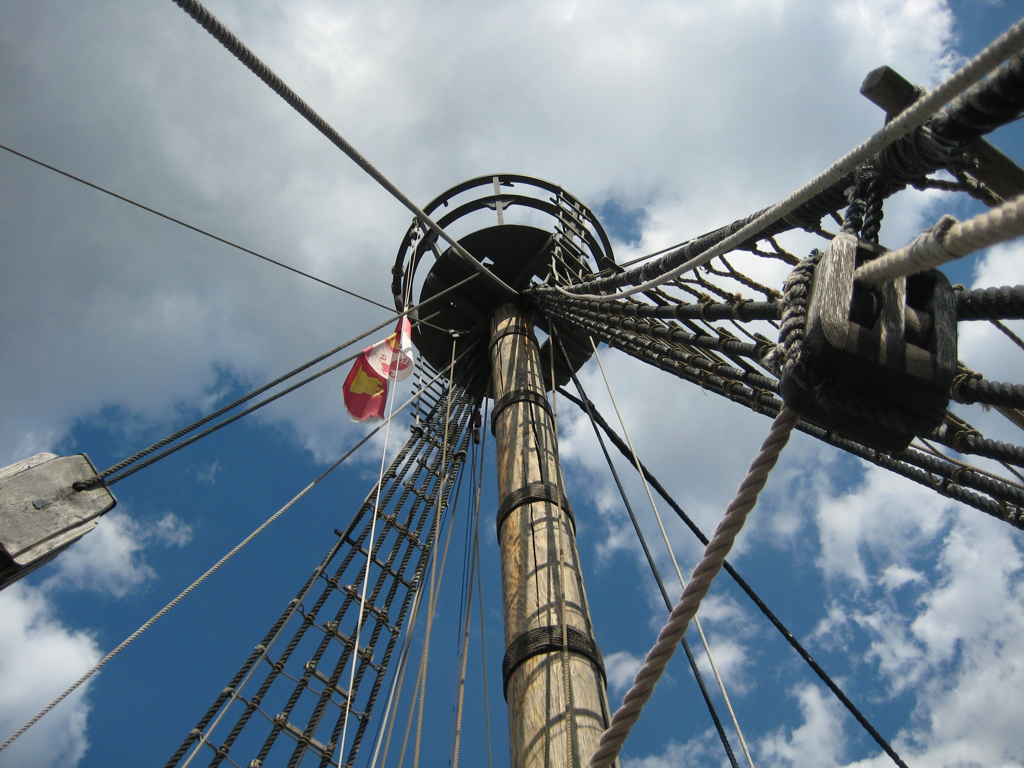
Crow's nest and rigging

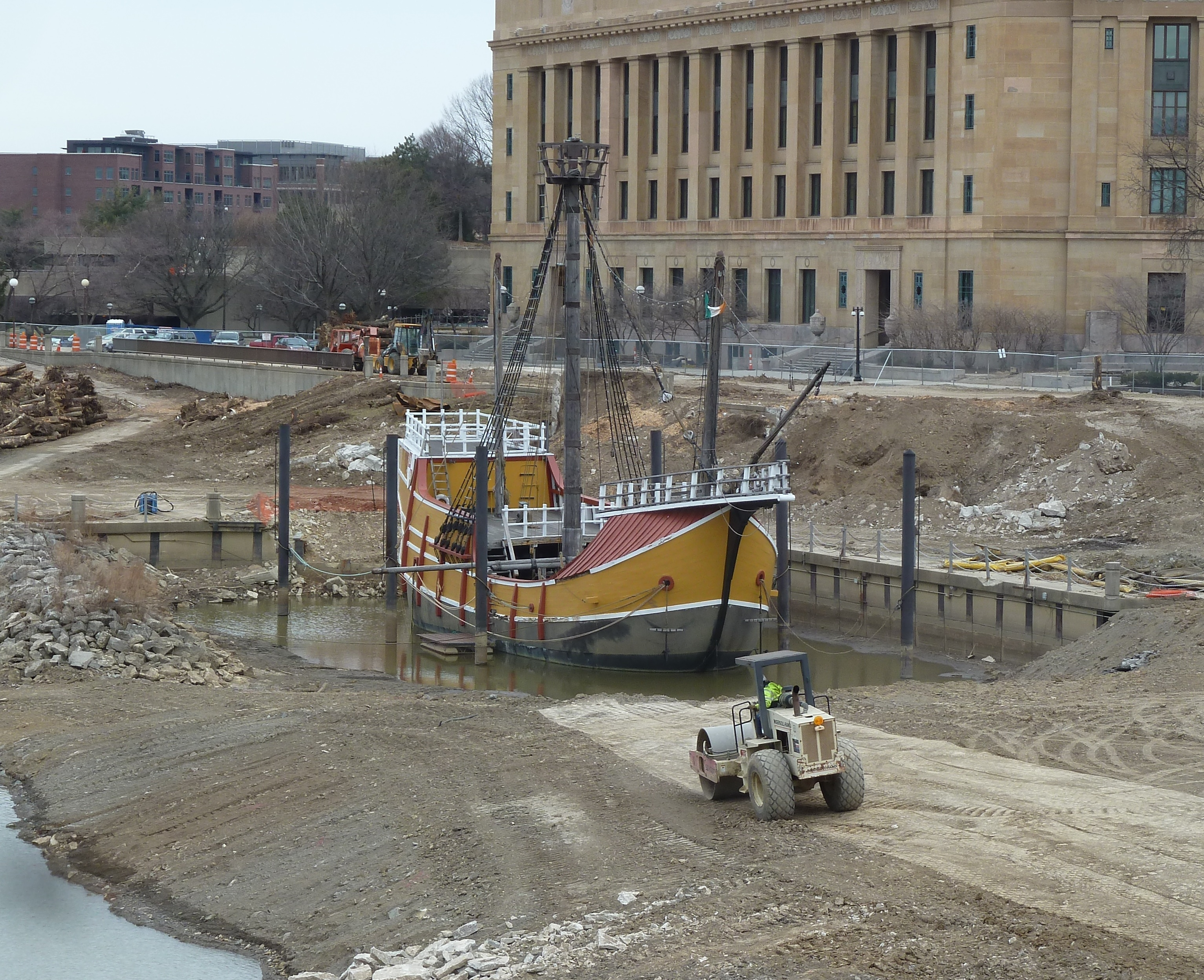
Scioto Mile construction around the ship, March 2014

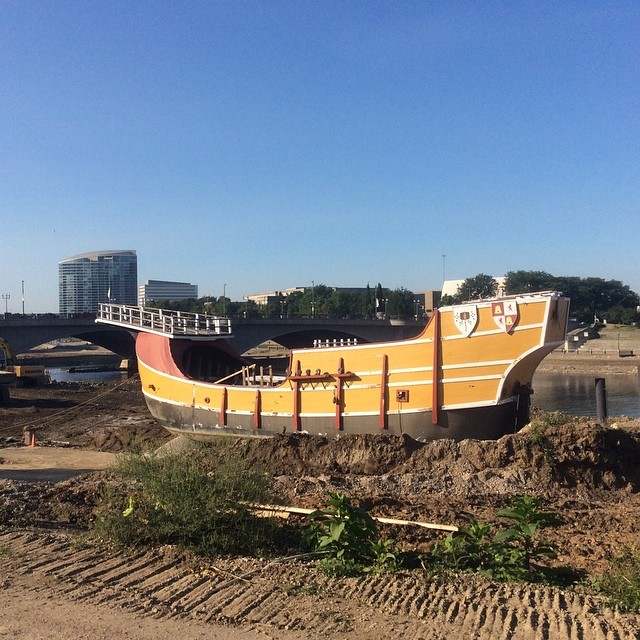
Demasted and removed from the river, August 2014

== See also ==
- List of museums in Columbus, Ohio
