= Spanish–American War Memorial (Columbus, Ohio) =

Sculpture in Columbus, Ohio, U.S.

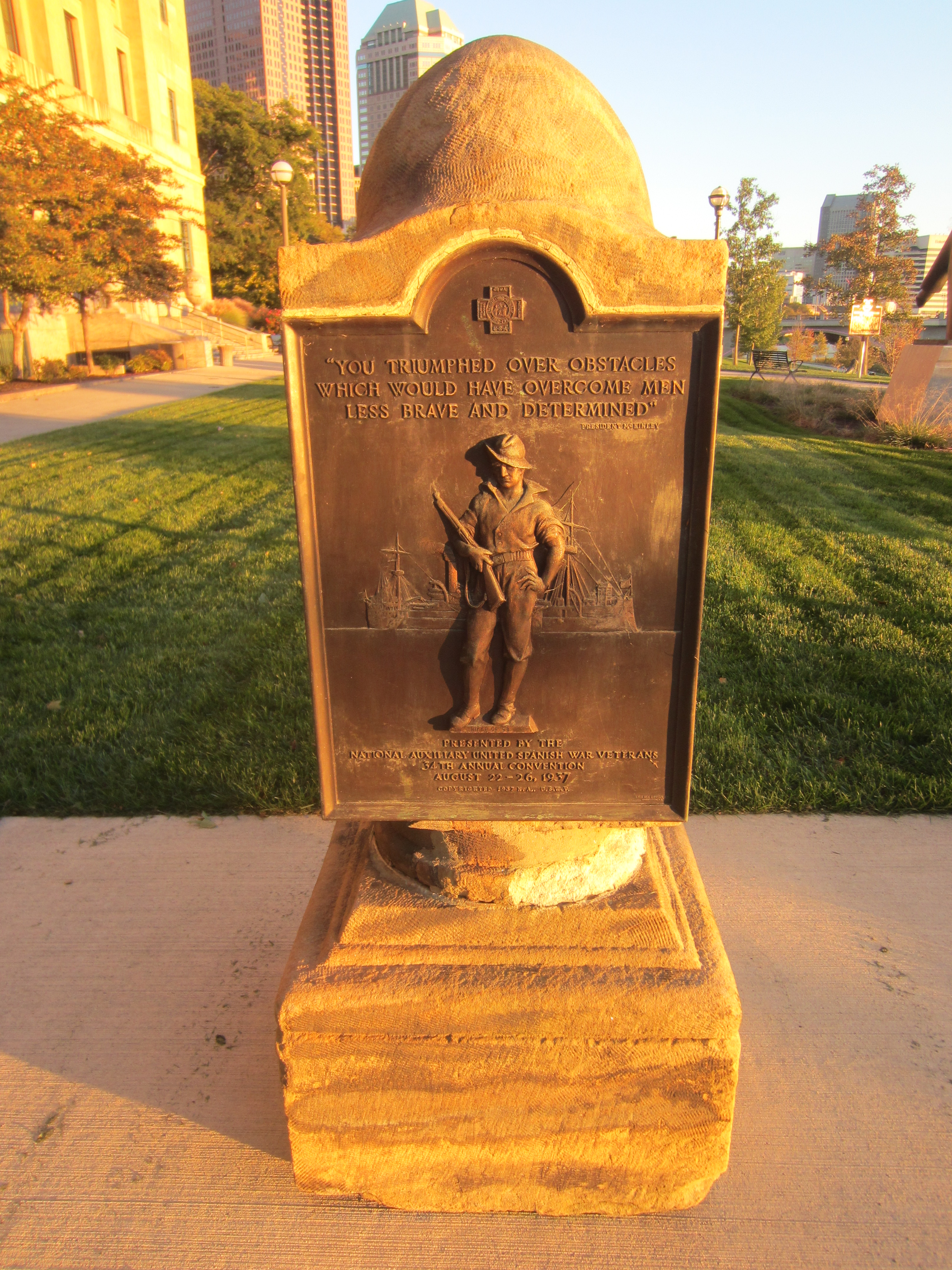
- The memorial in 2018
- Year: 1937
- Location: Columbus, Ohio, United States
- 39°57′49.5″N 83°0′21.1″W

The Spanish–American War Memorial (also known as Memorial to National Auxiliary United Spanish War Veterans, or simply Memorial to Spanish War Veterans) is a 1937 memorial commemorating veterans of the Spanish–American War, installed in Columbus, Ohio's Battelle Riverfront Park, in the United States.

== Description and history ==
The memorial, dedicated in August 1937, features a bronze relief plaque depicting a soldier holding a rifle. The plaque measures approximately 48.5 x 22 x 19 inches. One inscription reads: "YOU TRIUMPHED OVER OBSTACLES / WHICH WOULD HAVE OVERCOME MEN / LESS BRAVE AND DETERMINED" / PRESIDENT McKINLEY". Another reads, "THE HIKER'98", and one along the bottom of the plaque reads: "PRESENTED BY THE / NATIONAL AUXILIARY UNITED SPANISH WAR VETERANS / 54TH ANNUAL CONVENTION / AUGUST 22–26, 1937 / COPYRIGHTED N.A., V.S.W.V.". The plaque is one a stone base that measures approximately 17 x 27.5 x 29 inches.

The monument was presented to the city of Columbus by the National Auxiliary. It was installed outside Columbus City Hall, and was relocated to Battelle Riverfront Park in 1937. The memorial was surveyed by the Smithsonian Institution's "Save Outdoor Sculpture!" program in 1992.

== See also ==
- 1937 in art
