= Arvin J. Alexander Memorial =

Sculpture in Columbus, Ohio, U.S.

- The sculpture in 2018
- Artist: Carl Faehnle
- Year: 1991
- Medium: Granite sculpture
- Location: Columbus, Ohio, United States
- 39°57′50″N 83°00′23″W

The Arvin J. Alexander Memorial is a 1991 memorial commemorating the lawyer and politician of the same name by Carl Faehnle, installed in Columbus, Ohio's Alexander AEP Park, in the United States.

== Description and history ==
The abstract pink granite memorial features three angular elements, one of which has a metal plaque with the inscription:

ALEXANDER PARK / THIS PARK IS / DEDICATED TO / ARVIN J. ALEXANDER / 1909–1984 / TO HONOR AND PRESERVE THE MEMORY OF A COMPLETE AND TRUE FRIEND OF COLUMBUS, DISTINGUISHED LAWYER AND PRESIDENT OF CITY COUNCIL HE WORKED UNCEASINGLY AND SELFLESSLY TO PROMOTE THE BEST INTERESTS OF HIS BELOVED CITY BY GENERATING RESPECTFUL, NON-PARTISAN CONSENSUS. DETERMINED MAN OF VISION, ARVIN ALEXANDER TYPIFIED THE SPIRIT OF COLUMBUS. DONATED BY THE AMERICAN ELECTRIC POWER AND COLUMBUS SOUTHERN POWER

The geometric sculpture measures approximately 8 feet (2.4 m) x 3.5 feet (1.1 m) x 8 inches (20 cm), and rests on a concrete base approximately 3-foot (0.91 m) wide with a diameter of 18 inches (46 cm). The center element is polished and the other two have a matte finish.

The piece was surveyed by the Smithsonian Institution's "Save Outdoor Sculpture!" program in 1992.

== See also ==
- 1991 in art
