= Celebration of Life (sculpture) =

2004 sculpture by Alfred Tibor in Columbus, Ohio, U.S.

- The sculpture in 2008
- Artist: Alfred Tibor
- Year: 2004
- Medium: Bronze sculpture
- Location: Columbus, Ohio, United States
- 39°57′42″N 83°00′25″W

Celebration of Life, also known as the Arthur Boke/Sarah Sullivan statue, is a 2004 bronze sculpture by Alfred Tibor, installed near Franklinton's Genoa Park, in Columbus, Ohio, United States. The artwork depicts a woman holding a baby above her head, and commemorates Arthur Boke, the first known black child born in Franklinton, and Sarah Sullivant, the wife of Lucas Sullivant. The Sullivants, a white couple, raised Boke as their own child.

== See also ==
- 2004 in art
