= John Brickell =

- Born: John Brickell; May 24, 1781; Pennsylvania
- Died: July 24, 1844 (aged 63); Columbus, Ohio
- Known for: Captivity among Lenape

John Brickell (May 24, 1781 – 1844) was an early settler of Franklin County, Ohio who was abducted by the Lenape Tribe in 1791. For four years, Brickell lived among the Lenape tribe. Brickell was released as a result of the Treaty of Greenville in August 1795. A monument in Columbus, Ohio marks the location of Brickell's cabin.

== Abduction and captivity ==
In February 1791, Brickell was alone clearing out a fencerow near his brother's home in Ohio when a member of the local Lenape tribe approached Brickell with a rifle. The man took Brickell by his hand and drove him towards Tuscarawas. Brickell did not resist.

Brickell eventually suspected something was wrong and attempted to break free from the man's watch, however, the man caught Brickell before he could escape and threw him to the ground. The Native American man tied both of Brickell's hands together behind his back, and they continued walking. After traveling a short distance, they found a man named George Girty, who had also been abducted by the Lenape Indians. Girty, who spoke English, told Brickell, "White people have killed Indians, and the Indians retaliated, and now there is war, and you are a prisoner; and we will take you to our town and make an Indian of you. You will not be killed if you go peaceably, but if you try to run away, we won't be troubled with you. We will kill you and take your scalp to our town." Brickell went with Girty peacefully, thus beginning his captive life with the Lenape. Brickell lived with the natives for four years until the Treaty of Greensville secured his release in 1795.

== Legacy ==
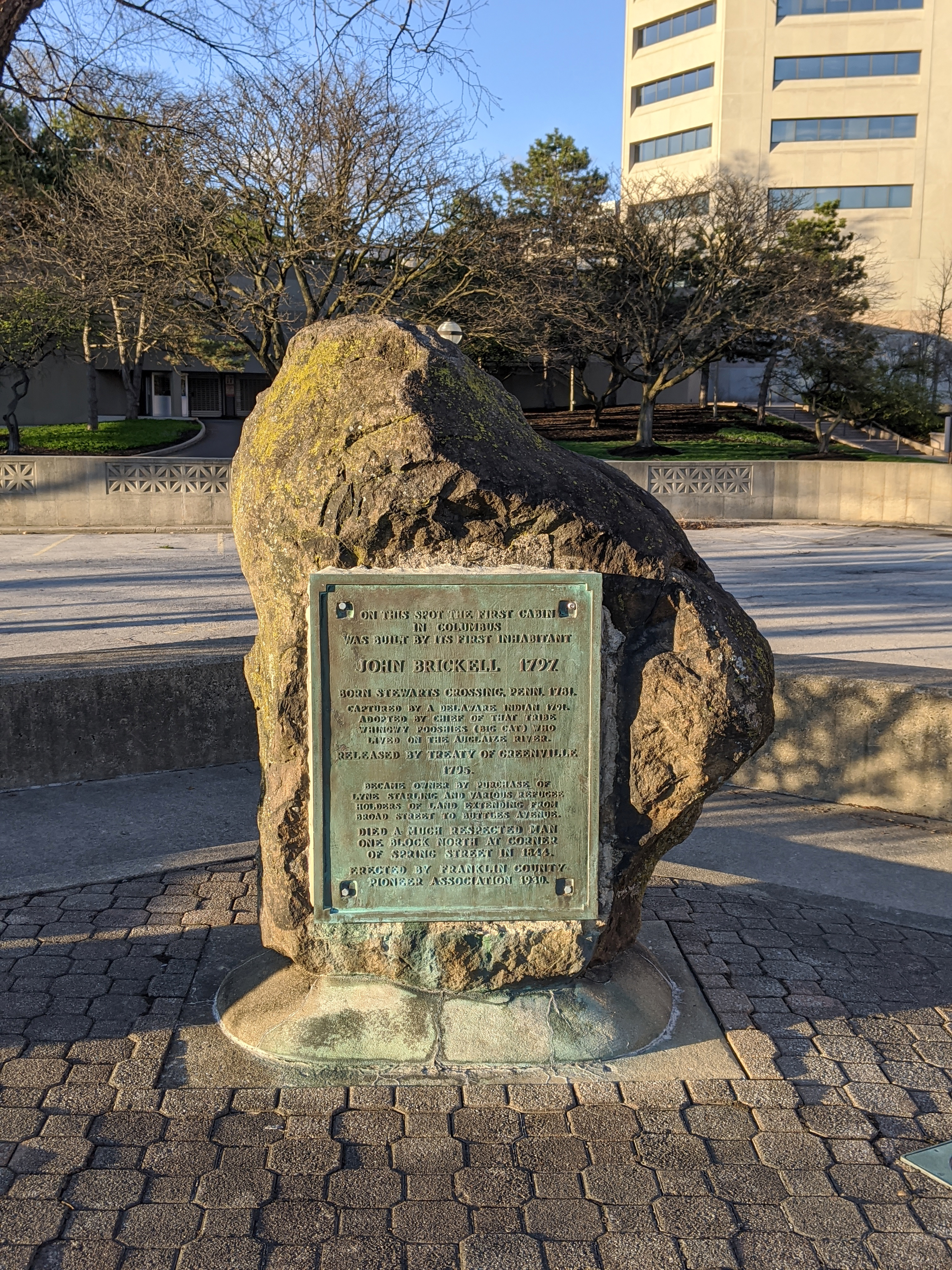
The Brickell Memorial

In 1797, Brickell returned to Ohio, and became an early settler of Columbus, Ohio. He resided there until his death on July 20, 1844, at age 64. He was buried in the North Graveyard. A monument in Columbus, Ohio, the Brickell Memorial, marks the location of Brickell's cabin. The monument's plaque claims that Brickell was the first inhabitant of Columbus, Ohio.
