= Brickell Memorial =

1930 monument in Ohio, United States

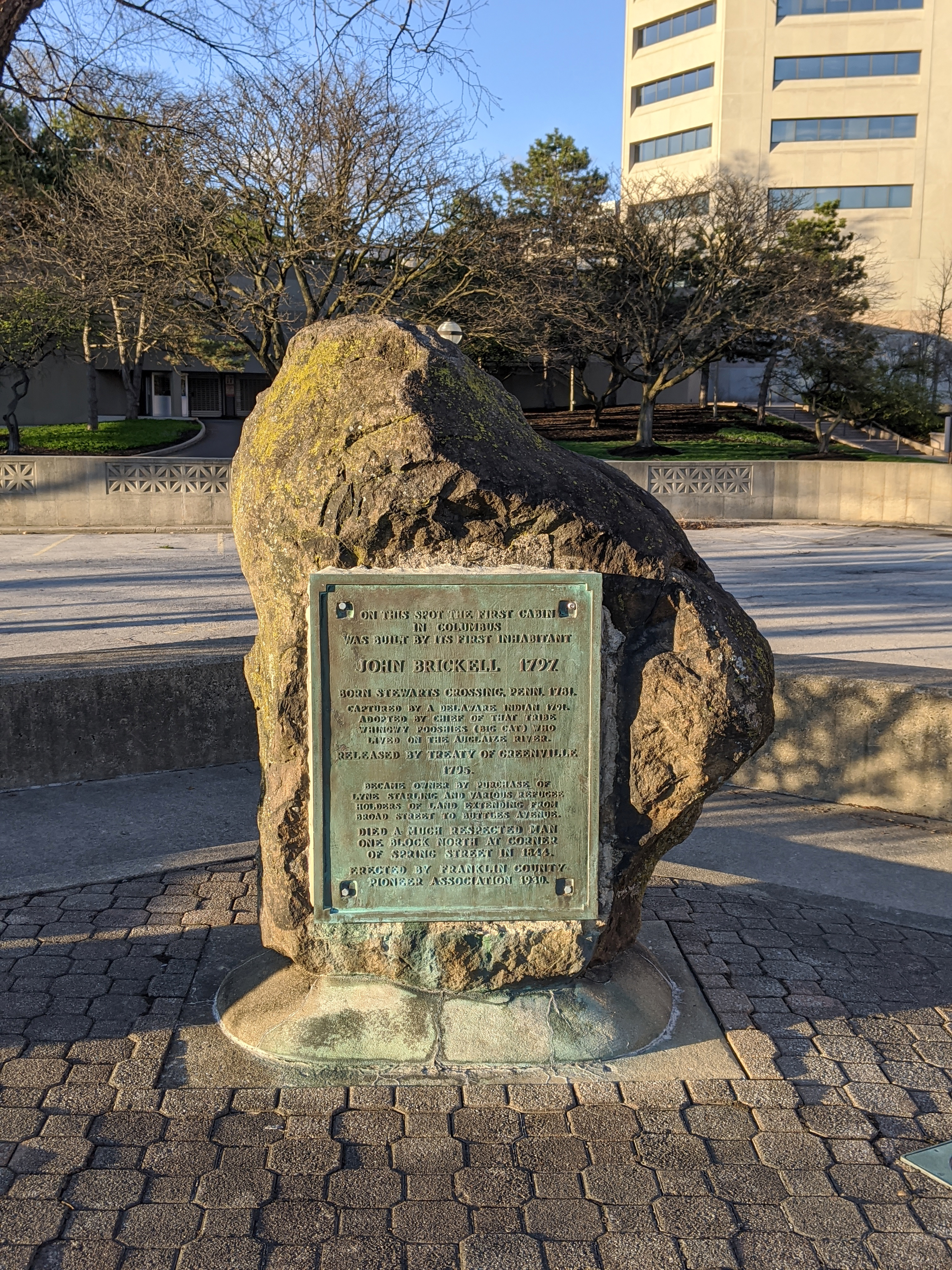
- The memorial in 2020
- 39°57′50.74″N 83°00′22.92″W
- Location: Alexander AEP Park, Downtown Columbus, Ohio
- Type: Memorial
- Material: Stone
- Length: 24 inches
- Width: 44 inches
- Height: 53 inches
- Dedicated to: John Brickell

The Brickell Memorial is an outdoor monument commemorating Columbus, Ohio's first citizen, John Brickell. The work was installed in 1930 in the present-day Alexander AEP Park in Columbus, Ohio, United States.

== Description ==
The memorial features a bronze plaque on a stone, which rests on a concrete base. The plaque has an inscription:

ON THIS SPOT THE FIRST CABIN / IN COLUMBUS / WAS BUILT BY ITS FIRST INHABITANT / JOHN BRICKLE 1797 / BORN STEWARTS CROSSING, PENN. 1781. / CAPTURED BY A DELAWARE INDIAN 1791 / ADOPTED BY CHIEF OF THAT TRIBE / WHINGWAY POOSHIES (BIG CAT) WHO / LIVED ON THE AUGLAIZE RIVER. / RELEASED BY TREATY OF GREENVILLE / 1795 / BECAME OWNER BY PURCHASE OF / LYNE STARLING AND VARIOUS REFUGEE / HOLDERS OF LAND EXTENDING FROM / BROAD STREET TO BUTTLES AVENUE / DIED A RESPECTED MAN / ONE BLOCK NORTH AT CORNER / OF SPRING STREET IN 1848. / ERECTED BY FRANKLIN COUNTY / PIONEER ASSOCIATION

The stone measures approximately 53 x 44 x 24 inches, the plaque is approximately 30 inches tall by 24 inches wide, and the base measures approximately 7 x 48 x 36 inches.

== History ==
The memorial was installed in 1930. It was surveyed by the Smithsonian Institution's "Save Outdoor Sculpture!" program in 1992.
