= Scioto Mile =

Group of parks and trails in Columbus, Ohio

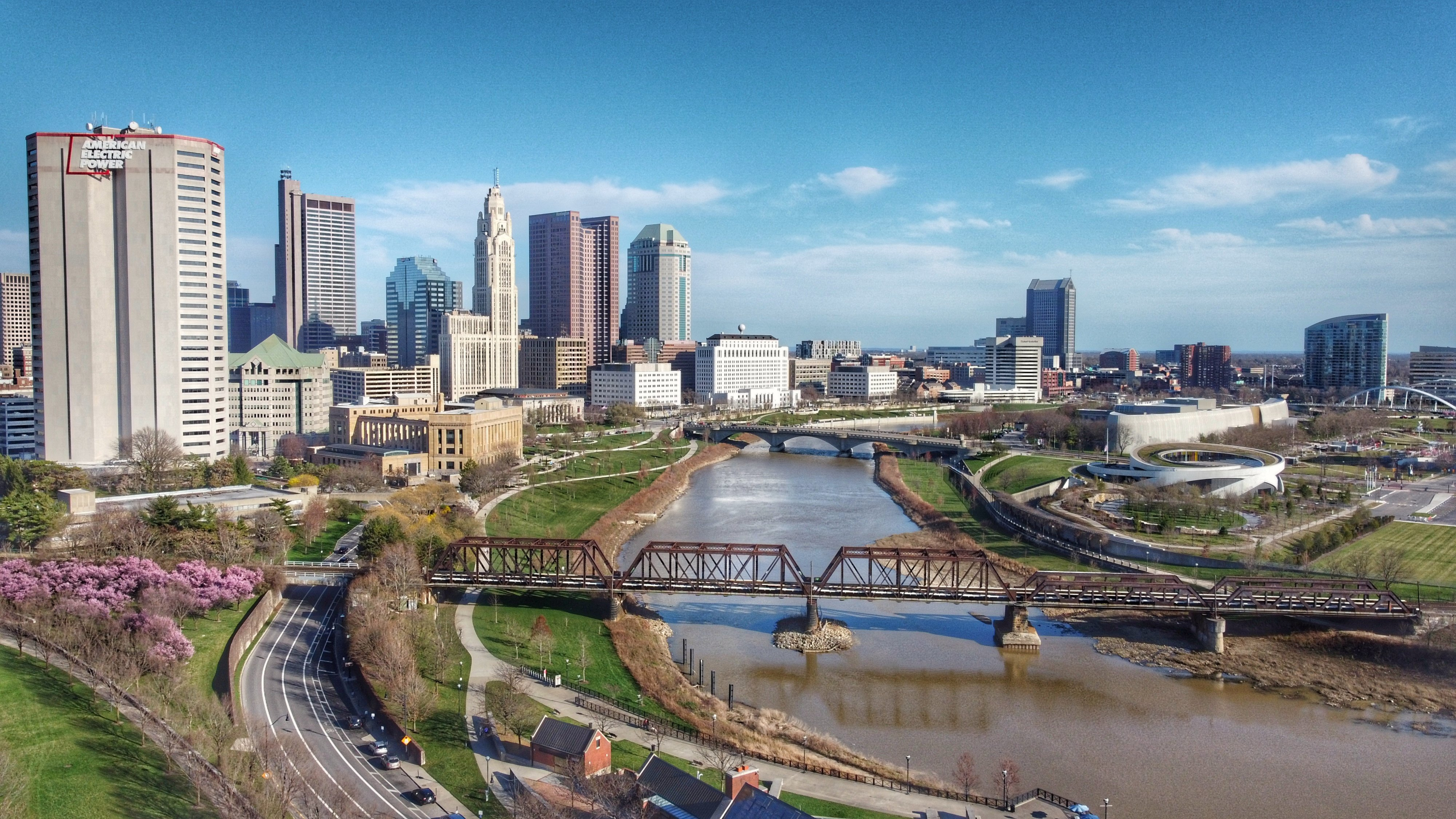
- Interactive map of the park network
- Coordinates: 39.960°N 83.005°W
- Administrator: Columbus Recreation and Parks Department
- Public transit: 3, 4, 5, 6, 7, 8, 9, 10, 11, 12; CoGo
- Website: Official website

The Scioto Mile is a collection of parks and trails along both banks of the Scioto River in Columbus, Ohio, connecting parts of the Scioto Greenway Trail with downtown Columbus and Franklinton. The nine parks cover 145 acres (59 ha).

== History ==
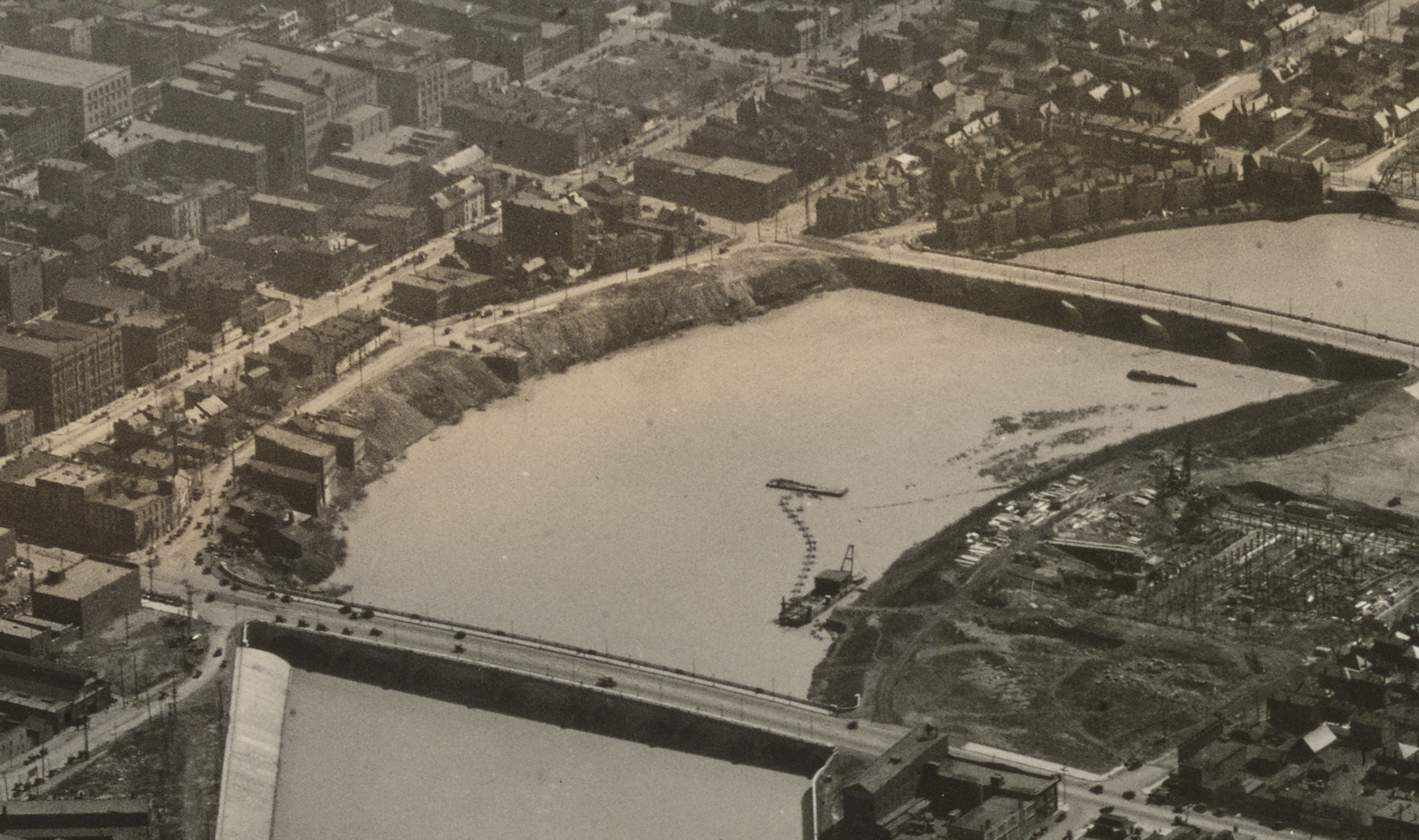
The Scioto River in Columbus c. 1923

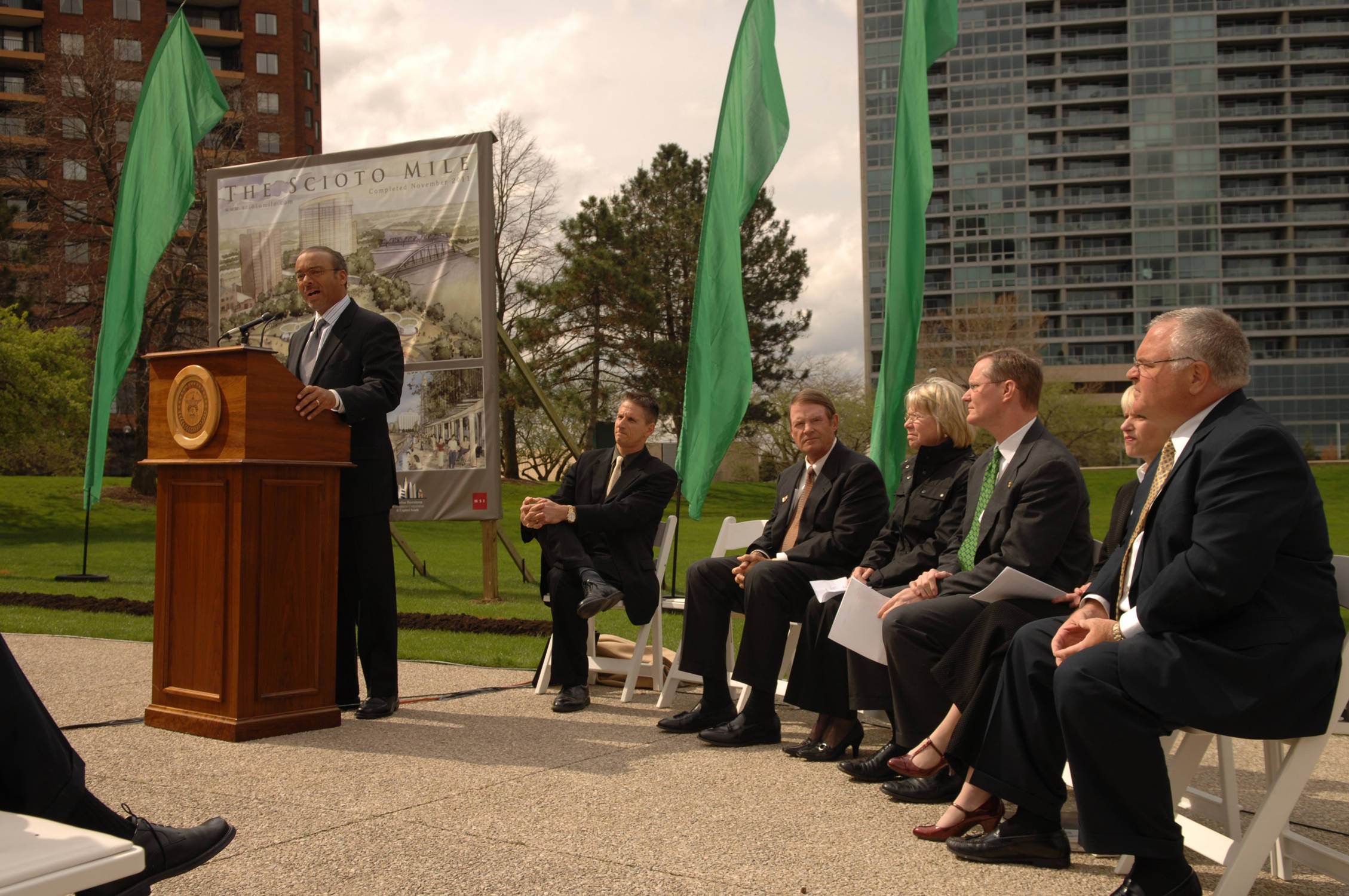
Mayor Coleman speaking at the Scioto Mile's 2008 groundbreaking

At the beginning of the 20th century, the banks of the Scioto River were lined with housing and businesses. Large civic buildings were planned and built: Columbus City Hall, the Ohio Judicial Center, and the Joseph P. Kinneary U.S. Courthouse. Bicentennial Park was the first added on the riverfront, in 1976; and in 1983, Battelle Riverfront Park opened. The parks were separated, and Civic Center Drive, then a five-lane street, cut the parks off from downtown Columbus. In 1992, a replica of Christopher Columbus's Santa María ship was docked at Battelle Riverfront Park to entice residents to the riverfront, but had limited success.

When Michael B. Coleman became mayor in 2000, he advocated development of the riverfront. The Scioto Mile was planned to connect the two parks, and was developed from 2011 to 2015. The first phase reduced Civic Center Drive from five to three lanes, allowing the installation of colonnades, fountains, gardens and pavilions. The park space along the entire Scioto River was then redeveloped, and Bicentennial Park completely redesigned. The river was stagnant and muddy due to the Main Street Dam, a low head dam built in 1918 to control flooding, but which doubled the width of the river to 600 feet (180 m). In 2013 the dam and surrounding sediment were removed, narrowing the river to 300 feet (91 m) and giving the city access to 33 acres (13 ha) of previously submerged shoreline. The connected parks have subsequently helped to revitalize the city's downtown.

From late 2018 to 2019, Smart Columbus operated a pilot program of electric driverless shuttles in a loop around the Scioto Mile. The program continued into 2020 in Columbus's Linden neighborhood.

== Attributes ==
The present-day parks include Alexander AEP Park, Battelle Riverfront Park, Bicentennial Park, Dorrian Green, Genoa Park, McFerson Commons, North Bank Park, Scioto Audubon Metro Park and the Scioto Mile Promenade. They are all city-owned, free, and open to everyone year-round, from at least 7 a.m. to 11 p.m.

Events along the Scioto Mile include the annual Columbus Arts Festival, the Columbus Caribbean Festival, Columbus Food Truck Festival, and Earth Day celebrations.

The riverbank features a riparian zone, a natural line of plants that keeps soil from eroding into the water.

== Gallery ==
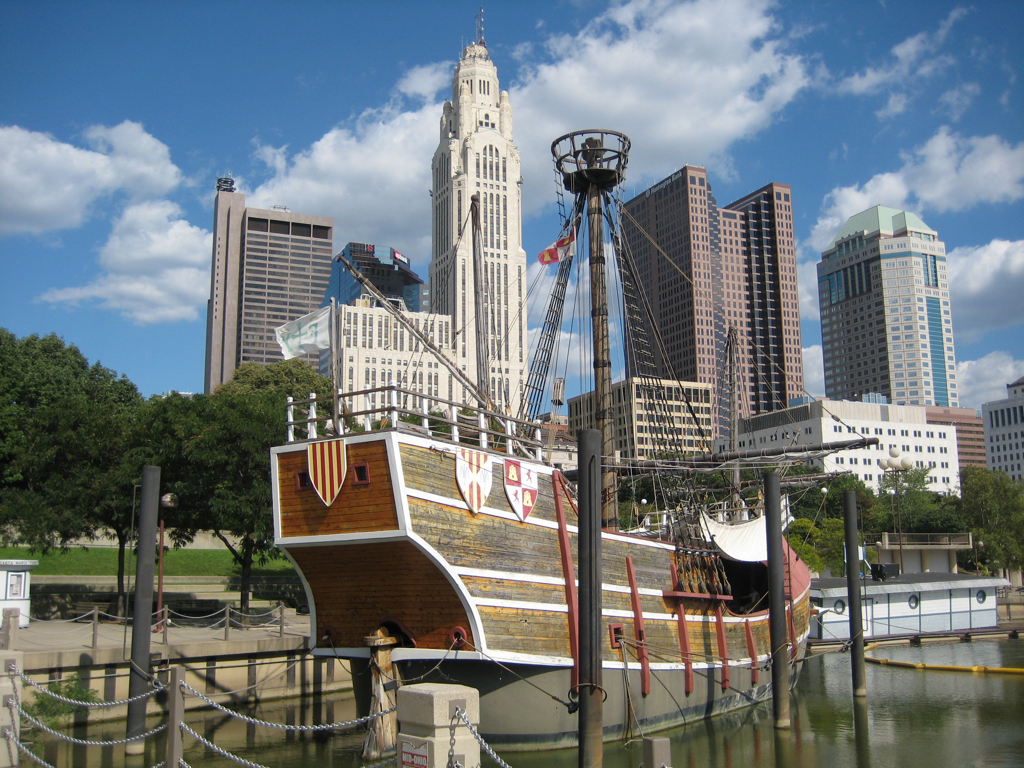
The Santa Maria Ship & Museum, a highlight of the riverfront for decades

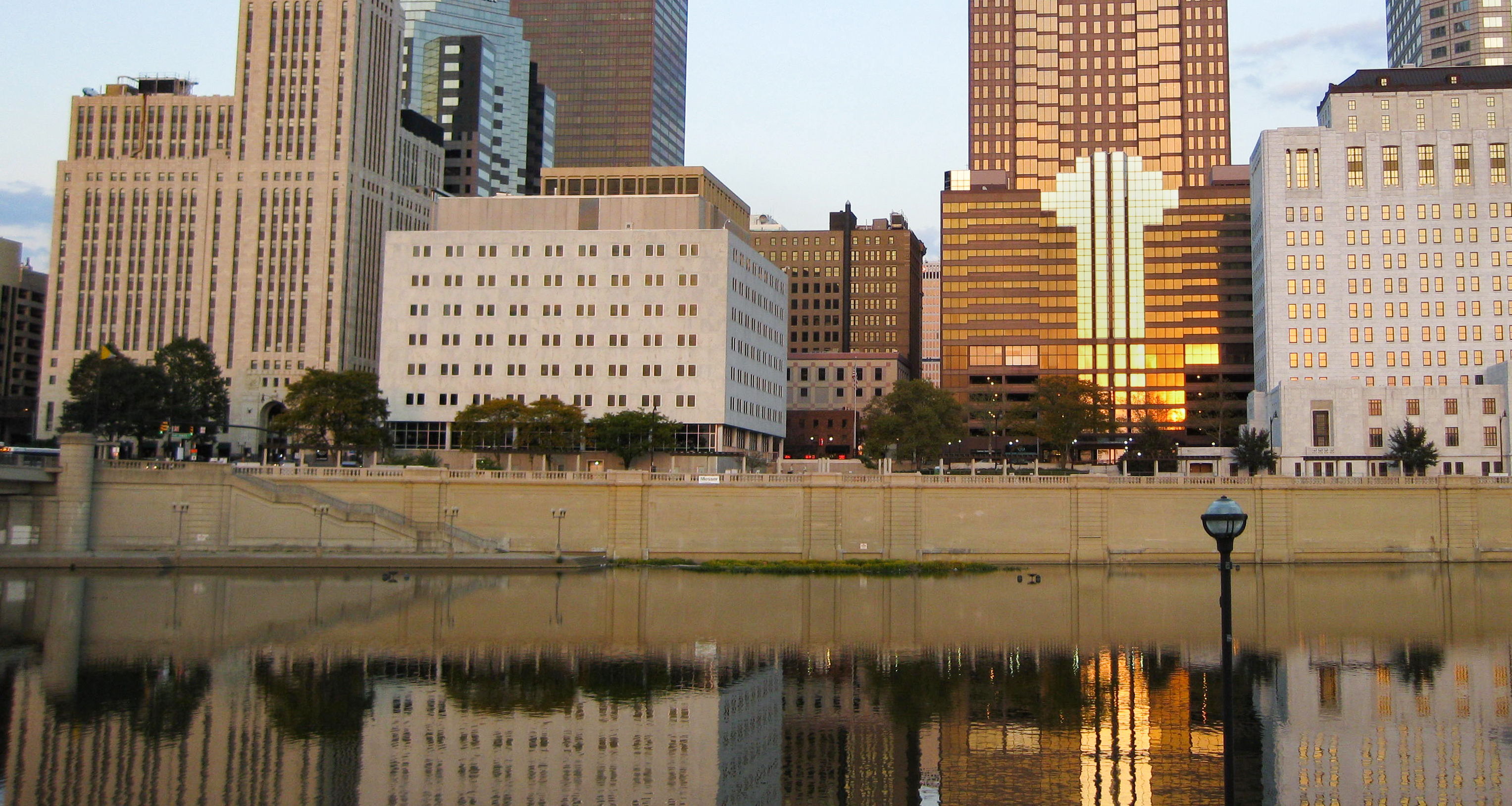
The Promenade in 2010, in early stages of redevelopment

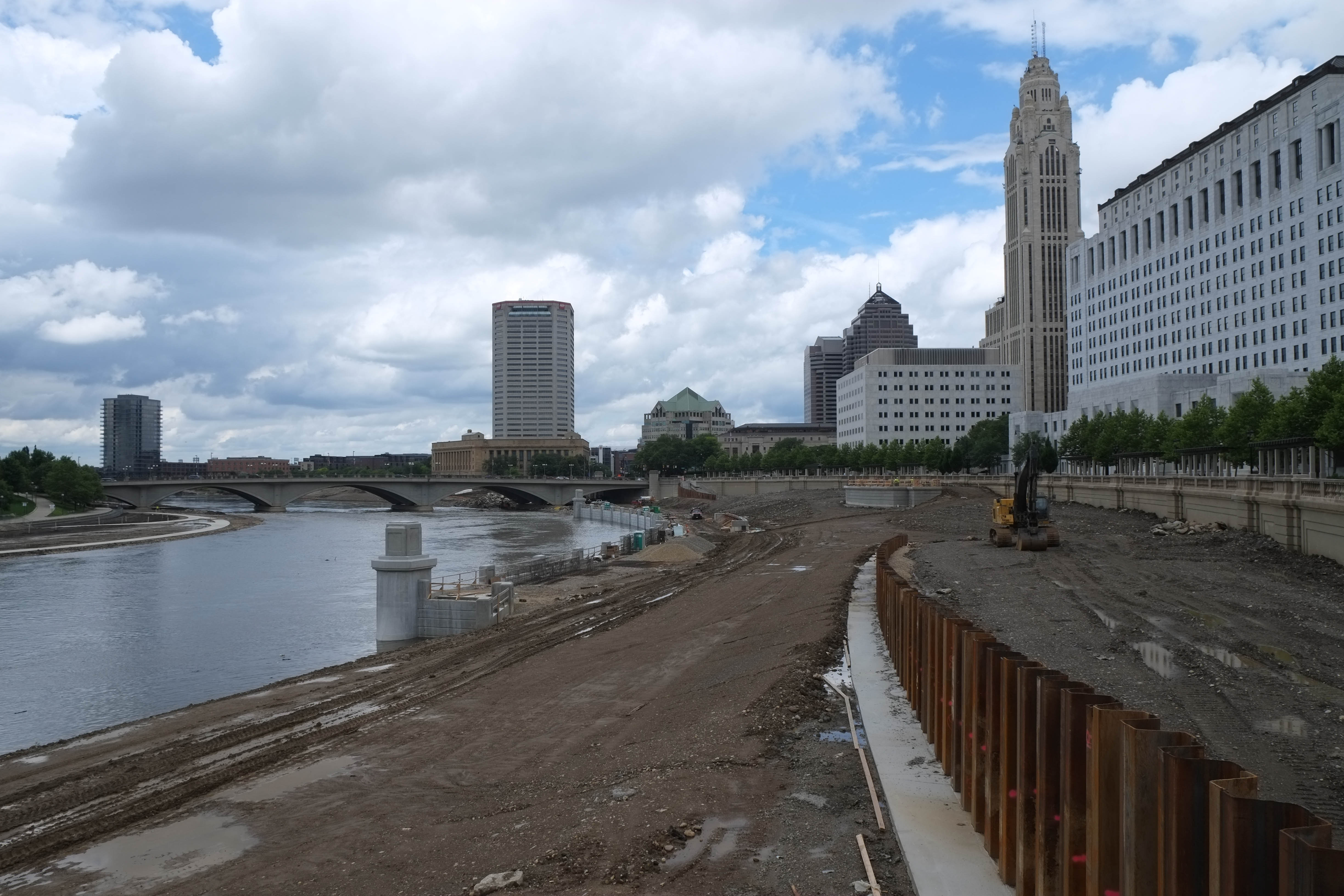
Creating park space in 2015

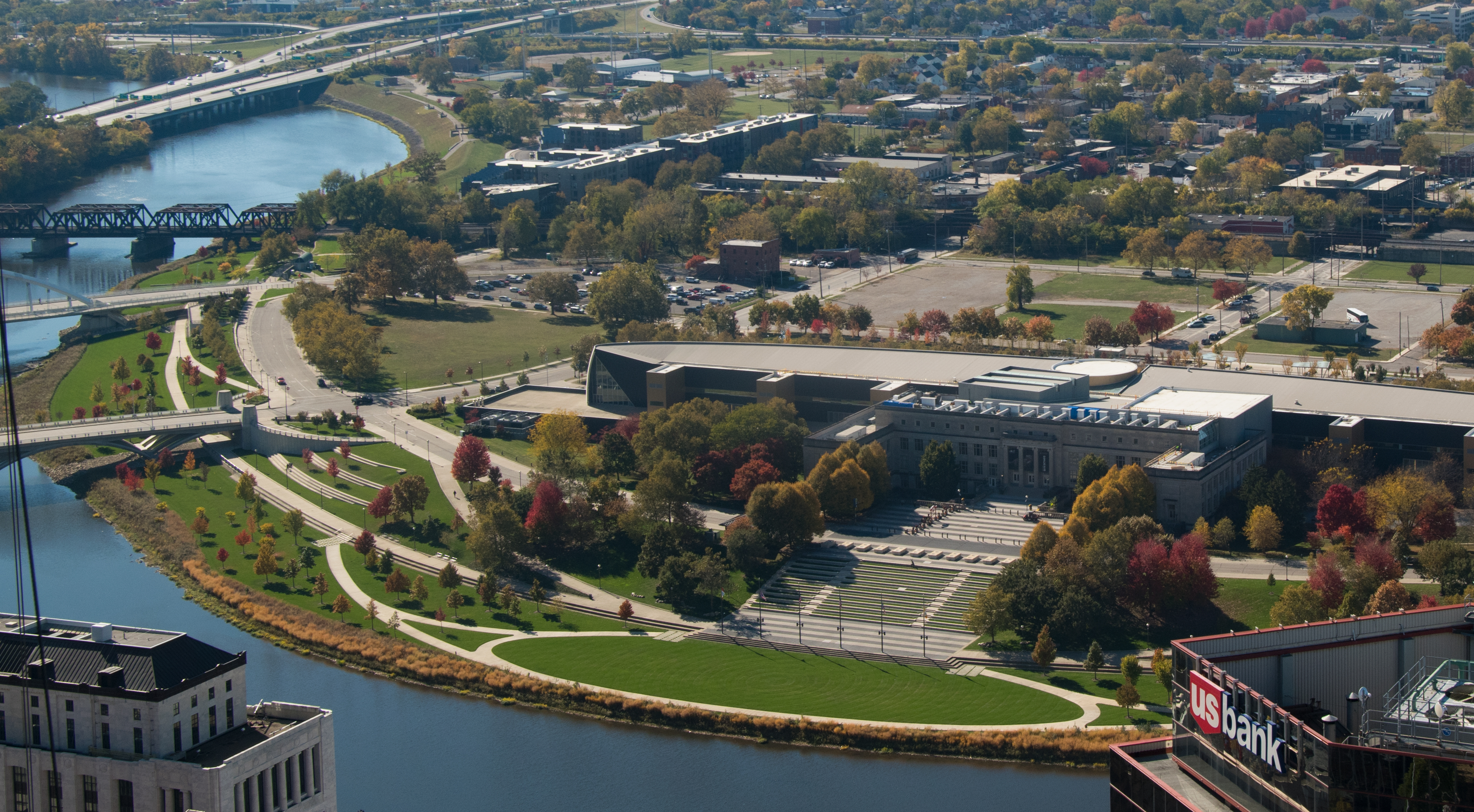
Genoa Park on the west bank

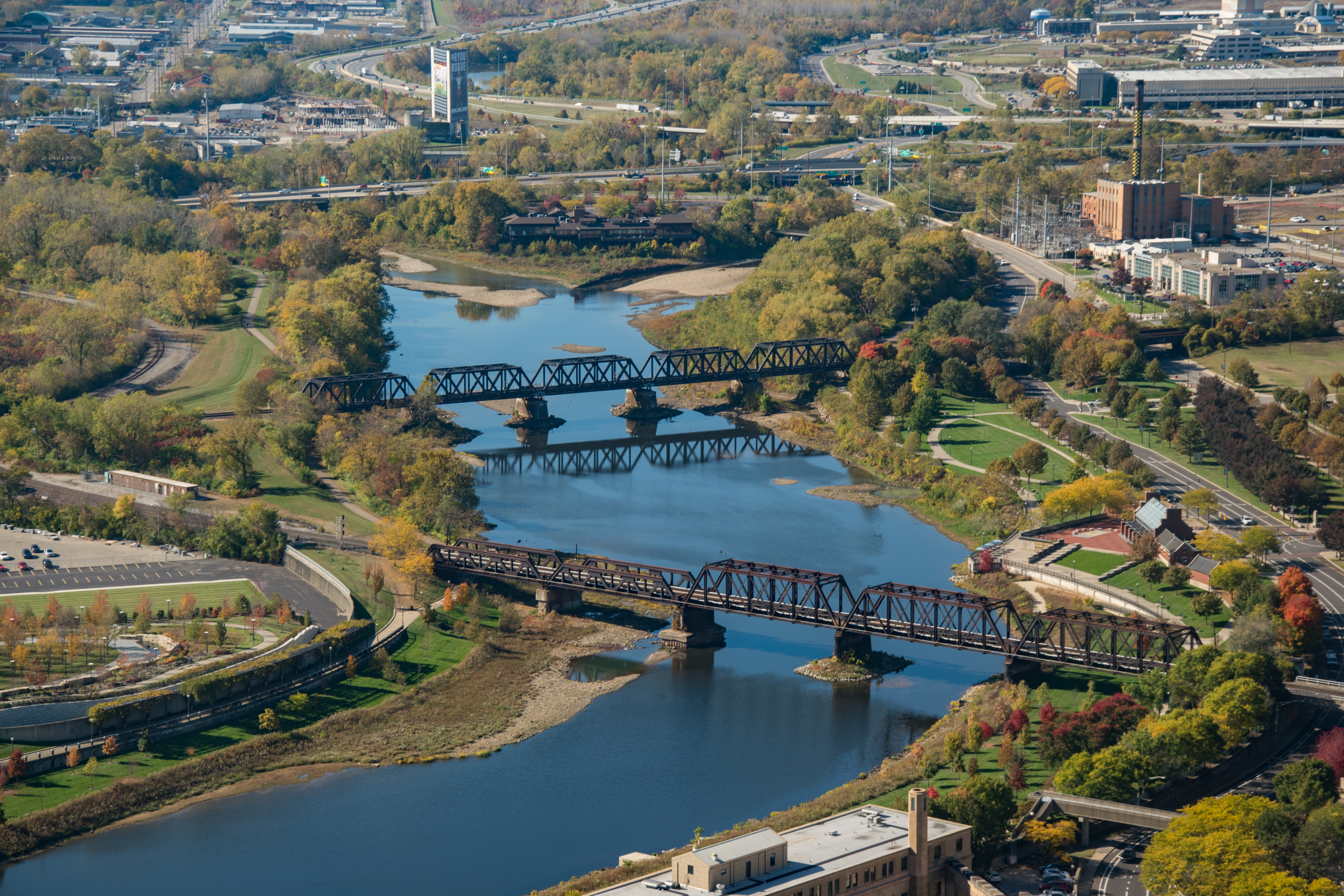
Battelle Riverfront and North Bank Parks on the east bank
