= Battelle Riverfront Park =

Park in Columbus, Ohio, U.S.

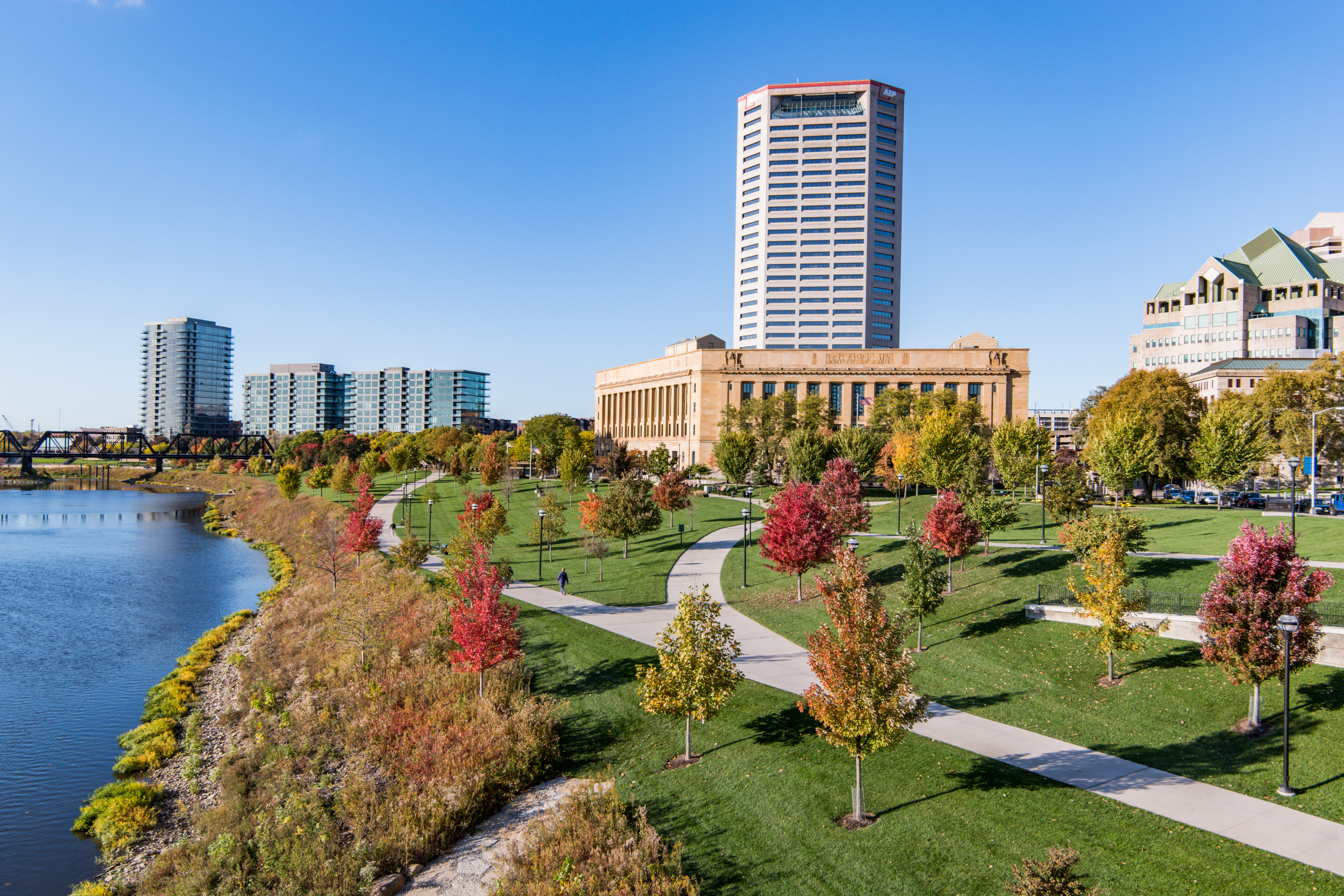
- The park in 2019
- Interactive map of the park among others on the Scioto Mile
- Coordinates: 39°57′47″N 83°00′19″W
- Opened: 1983; 43 years ago
- Administrator: Columbus Recreation and Parks Department
- Public transit: 4, 5, 7, 10, 11, 12; CoGo
- Website: Official website

Battelle Riverfront Park is a 4.1-acre (1.7 ha) park in downtown Columbus, Ohio, United States, near Columbus City Hall. The park was established in 1983. It is named after Gordon Battelle and was funded by the Battelle Memorial Institute.

== Features ==
The park features the James W. Barney Pickaweekee Story Grove (moved from a nearby children's park) amid several monuments and memorials, including the Columbus Firefighters Memorial (1958), Spanish–American War Memorial (1937), Their Spirits Circle the Earth (1987), and To Honor the Immigrants (1992). Alfred Tibor's sculpture Freedom (1985) is also installed in the park.

Several of the park's monuments and memorials were moved here from the Harry E. Richter Workers Memorial Park in 2016. That park, built in 2000, held a memorial originally placed in Franklin Park in 1992. The Richter Workers Memorial Park was replaced in 2016 with the Michael B. Coleman Government Center, which opened two years later.

The Santa Maria Ship & Museum, a replica of Christopher Columbus's Santa María, was docked on the Scioto River by the park beginning in 1991, as part of the city's 1992 Christopher Columbus Quincentennial Jubilee, celebrating the 500th anniversary of Columbus's voyage to the Americas. The ship's presence was aimed to draw people to the Columbus riverfront, though it had limited success, and attendance dropped over the years. The nonprofit tourist organization that operated it closed in 2011, and the Columbus Recreation and Parks Department inherited it. $5–6 million was estimated for its repairs, and with the extensive renovation of the Scioto's riverfront, the ship had to be relocated. It was removed in 2014, and remains in a city-owned lot in the South Side, in ten pieces. Environmental Protection Agency rules no longer permit it back on the Scioto River, and nobody has expressed interest in restoring the ship given the expense.

== See also ==
- List of parks in Columbus, Ohio
