= Saint Cyprian Church (Columbus, Ohio) =

Catholic church and school in Ohio, US

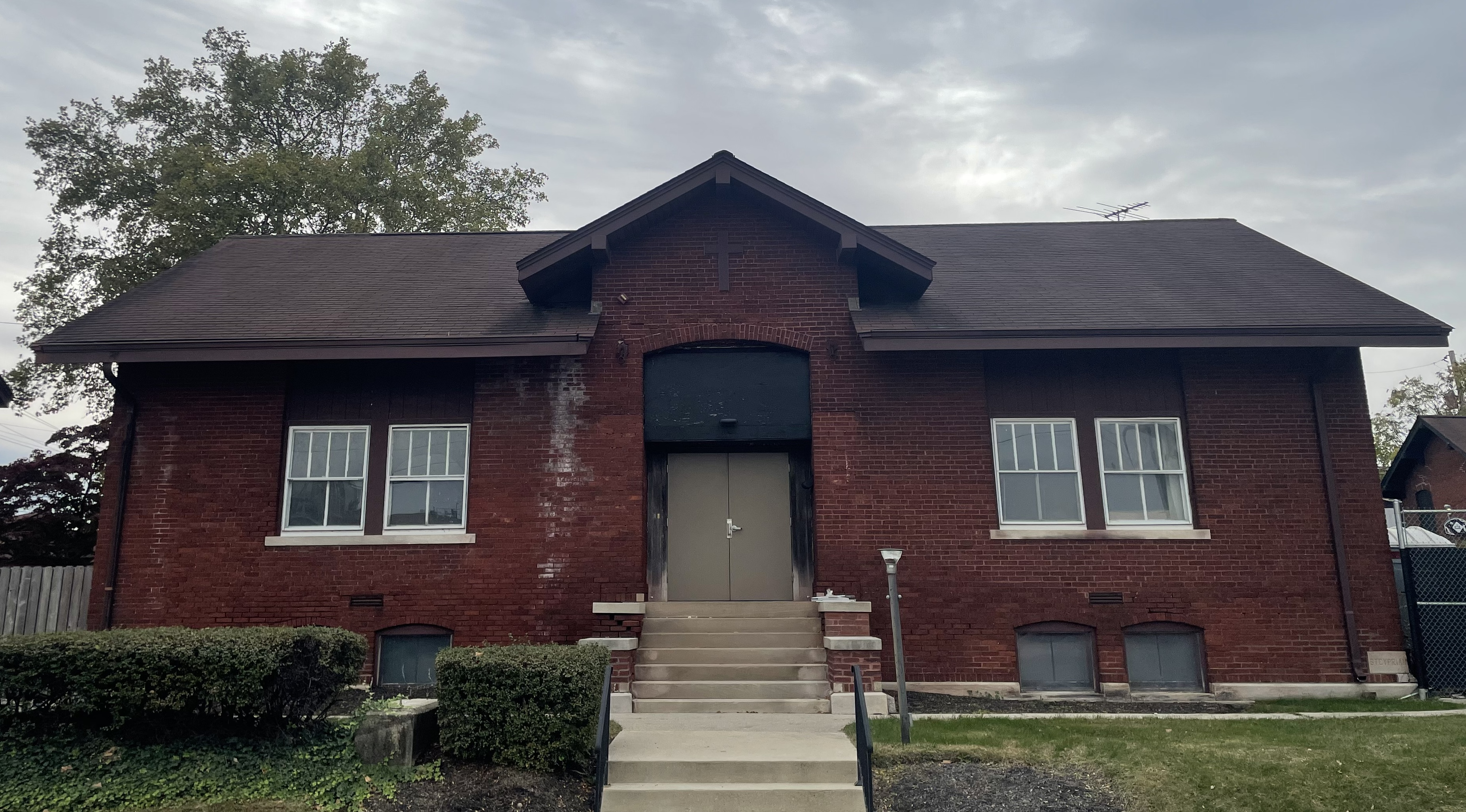
- Saint Cyprian Church
- 39°58′11″N 82°57′51″W
- Address: 1405-1413 Hawthorne Avenue; Columbus, Ohio, US
- Denomination: Catholic
- Religious institute: Sisters of the Blessed Sacrament; Congregation of the Immaculate Heart of Mary

Architecture
- Completed: 1912
- Closed: 1958

Administration
- Parish: St. Dominic Parish

Saint Cyprian Church was a Black Catholic parish church and parochial school of the Diocese of Columbus, located in the King-Lincoln Bronzeville neighborhood of Columbus, Ohio, United States. The parish was founded in 1912, merged with the neighboring St. Dominic Parish in 1957 and closed the following year. The complex continued to be used by the Columbus diocese and other charities until 1999, when The Ohio State University acquired the buildings for storage and medical office use. In 2021, the church and school buildings were placed on Columbus Landmarks' list of "Most Endangered Sites".

== History ==
=== Founding ===
As African Americans began to settle in Columbus during the Great Migration, bishop James Hartley requested in 1911 that Katharine Drexel send Sisters of the Blessed Sacrament for Indians and Colored People to staff a school for black children in Columbus. Hartley agreed to pay $8,000 for the construction of a combined church and school, and the Sisters of the Blessed Sacrament would build a convent for $4,400. On April 19, 1912, ground was broken for the school building, which would be dedicated to Cyprian of Carthage. The site was across the street from St. Anthony Hospital (now Ohio State East Hospital), and the sisters attended Mass in the hospital chapel until the St. Cyprian chapel was ready.

At the ceremonial laying of the cornerstone, on June 4 of the same year, the diocesan newspaper described how it had been Hartley's intention to bless the cornerstone "in privacy, but numbers of colored people had gathered at the place and showed their deep interest by their earnest and respectful demeanor during the solemn and impressive ceremony." The building, upon completion, had two large schoolrooms and a chapel that could seat 250 people. Very few black people in Columbus were Catholic at the time of the founding of the congregation, and there was only one African-American Catholic present at the first Mass of the parish. The school opened with 28 pupils, all non-Catholic, and by the following year enrollment had grown to 84 pupils with four sisters serving as teachers, all under the direction of Fr. John O'Neil, the founding pastor. In 1914 a second building, housing three schoolrooms and a large basement, was completed.

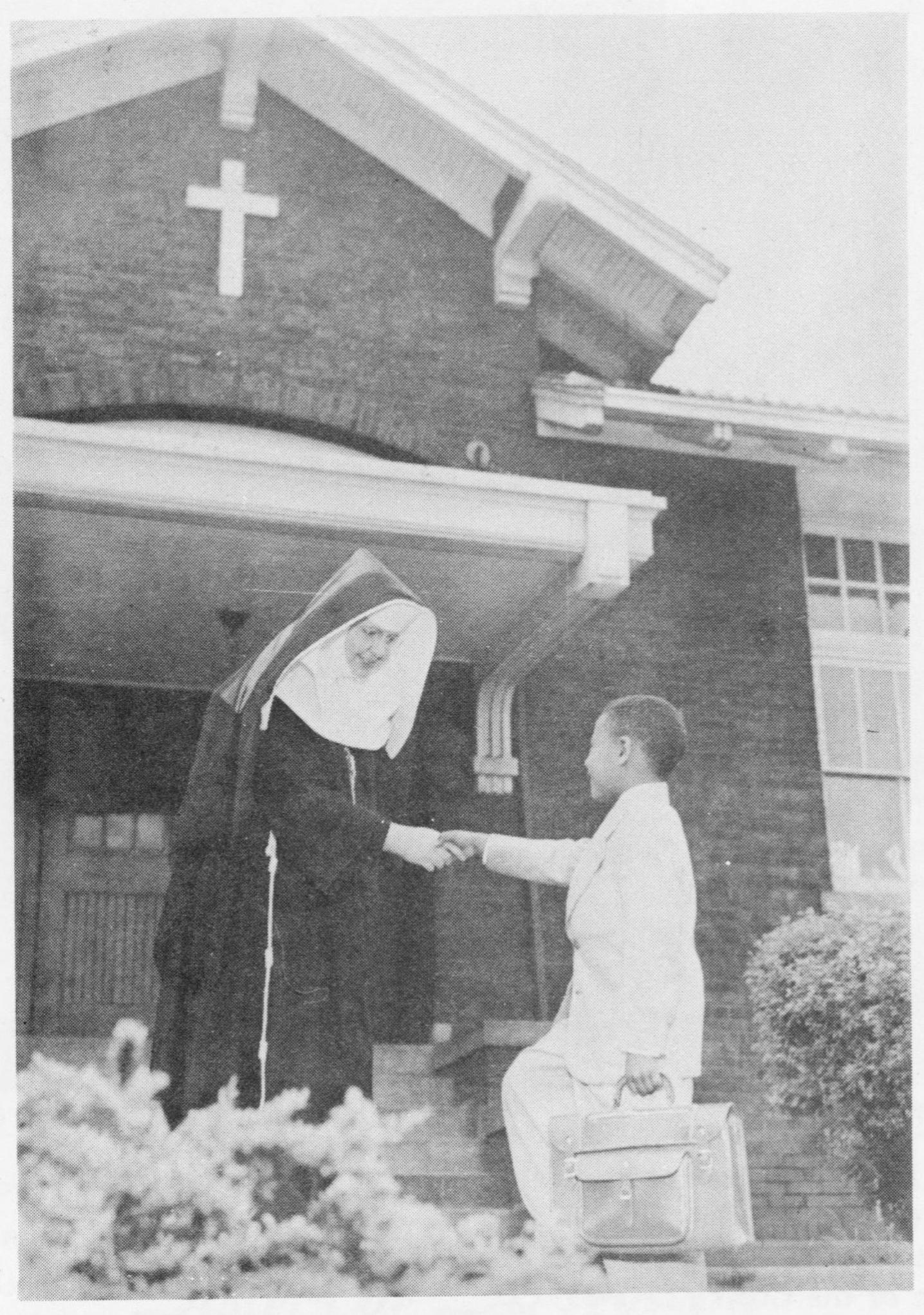
A Sister of the Blessed Sacrament greeting a schoolboy at St. Cyprian in the 1950s.

=== Closure and alternate use ===
By the mid-1940s, the congregation recorded over 500 baptisms, a school attendance of 125 with a majority of students being non-Catholic, and a total parish membership of around 400. In 1946, the CICM Missionaries took over care of the parish from the Diocese. Due to changing populations in the neighborhood, as well as the proximity of St. Cyprian to St. Dominic, the two parishes were merged on March 25, 1957, and the parish schools were merged in 1958. The Sisters of the Blessed Sacrament continued to teach at St. Dominic School until it was merged with the parochial schools of Holy Rosary Church and Saint John the Evangelist Church in 1970.

Masses were occasionally said at the St. Cyprian chapel and the former school buildings were used to house the Diocesan Men's and Women's conferences, as well as the Columbus branch of the Confraternity of Christian Doctrine. The chapel on the property was closed in 1958 due to vandalism but reopened in the early 1960s to house the first Byzantine Catholic congregation in Columbus until 1965. The other buildings on the property went on to house a clothing bank sponsored by Franklin County Childrens Services before being purchased by the Ohio State University in 1999. Ohio State uses the property for storage and medical offices. In 2021, Columbus Landmarks designated the complex as one of its yearly "Most Endangered" sites, along with the Pythian Temple and James Pythian Theater.
