= Hassan Jeru-Ahmed =

African American activist (1924–2011)

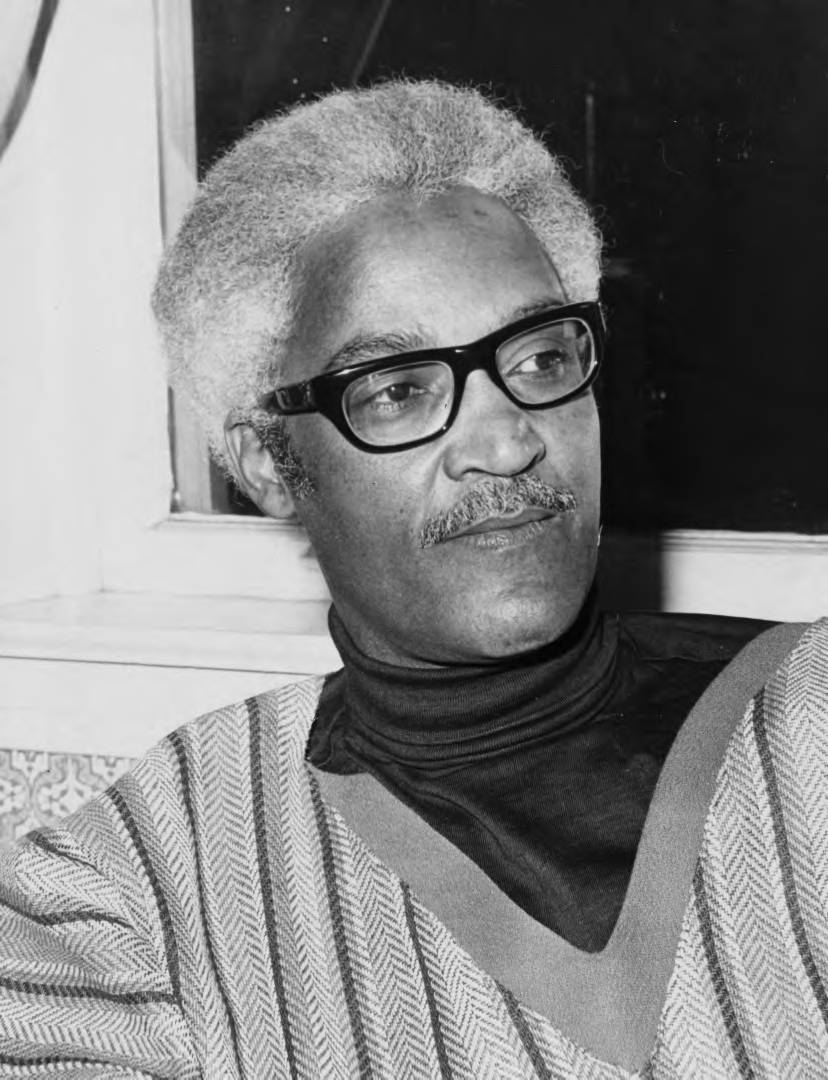
- Hassan in 1971
- Born: Albert Roy Osborne; March 24, 1924; Washington, D.C., US
- Died: July 21, 2011 (aged 87)
- Organizations: Blackman's Voluntary Liberation Army; Blackman's Development Center
- Movement: Black Nationalism; Back-to-Africa; Black Power; Black Separatism; War On Drugs

Hassan Jeru-Ahmed (born Albert Roy Osborne; March 9, 1924 – July 21, 2011) was an American Black power, Black separatist and anti-drug activist and politician who founded the Blackman's Volunteer Army of Liberation as well as the offshoot Blackman's Community Development Center. He also ran for delegate of District of Columbia's at-large congressional district in 1972.

== Biography ==
=== Early life ===
Albert Osborne was born in 1924 in Washington, D.C., and attended Shaw Junior High School until he dropped out at the age of 17 after being imprisoned for robbery. He became addicted to heroin and was incarcerated for property crimes first at the National Training School for Boys and then at the Federal Correctional Institution, Petersburg. During World War II, he was drafted into the United States Army Air Forces, serving in both the European and Pacific theaters. He also visited North Africa, and later stated that the people there gave him the name Hassan. At the end of the war, he returned to D.C. and briefly ran a delicatessen, was placed under psychiatric hold in 1950, and returned to jail for check fraud in 1957. During this stint in prison, he encountered the ideology of Elijah Muhammad, Marcus Garvey, and Malcolm X. His wife was also murdered during one of his sentences. In 1962, upon his release from prison, he became a wig salesman during a time when yak-hair wigs were very popular among blacks in Washington, D.C.

=== Blackman's Volunteer Army of Liberation ===
He was living in Los Angeles during the Watts riots in 1965, and met Black Muslims there who began to convince him of Black nationalism. A wig shop Osborne owned in the L.A. area was burned down in the riots. He then returned to Washington D.C. and organized the Blackman's Volunteer Army of Liberation (BVLA) in 1966, initially envisioning the organization as a paramilitary back-to-Africa group. It was also around this time that Osborne changed his name to Hassan Jeru-Ahmed, preferring to simply be called "Hassan".

Hassan initially planned for the BVLA to be a successor of the ideologies of Marcus Garvey and Malcom X, planning to return to Africa with his Black Star Regiment and become resistance fighters in countries like Angola, Southern Rhodesia, and South Africa. Members of the BDC dressed in military fatigues, black berets, and fezzes. Realizing the impracticality of their back-to-Africa ambitions, the BVLA pivoted to organizing food drives, neighborhood cleanups, and improving local housing. By 1968 Hassan added neighborhood watch responsibilities to the group's activities, first in the Mount Pleasant neighborhood which at that time had high rates of heroin use as well as crime.

=== Anti-drug activity and Blackman's Development Center ===
Hassan viewed drug dealers as race traitors and believed that heroin reached Washington, D.C. by means of a conspiracy between the government and the Mafia. BVLA members would also physically raid D.C. drug houses, assault drug dealers, and destroy stocks of heroin, after first verbally warning dealers. This led to death threats against Hassan and BDC buildings being burnt down.

In the days leading up to the 1967 Newark riots, Hassan and an associate disrupted a city planning meeting concerning the use of eminent domain to construct a hospital in a predominantly black neighborhood, and began to conduct target practice with a rifle behind a storefront the BVLA had leased. The state select commission which investigated the riots noted the presence of Hassan prior to the unrest and his disappearance during the disorder itself.

In the late 1960s, Hassan and the BVLA organized the Blackman's Development Center (BDC), which began as a community center which taught vocational skills. Its mission soon expanded to drug addiction treatment via methadone in May 1969, serving thousands of addicts over its existence. The BDC and Hassan began to collaborate with the federal government in addiction treatment, with Hassan testifying before a Senate subcommittee on alcohol and narcotics in April 1970. Robert DuPont, later Richard Nixon's drug czar, met with Hassan in 1969 to discuss collaboration, with DuPont saying that the BVLA was the "largest game in town".

On February 26, 1971, the United States Department of Health and Human Services and the Department of Labor gave the BDC grants totaling $523,000. An additional $169,000 of funding was given by the District of Columbia's Narcotics Treatment Administration. By this time, Hassan's treatment program was treating 2800 addicts per week.

=== Antisemitism and move to Ohio ===
This funding prompted protests and letter-writing campaigns from the Anti-Defamation League, which pointed to the distribution of antisemitic tracts signed by Hassan by the BDC. These described the NAACP as a tool of the "Jewish-Communist conspiracy" and posited the existence of the International Jewish conspiracy, among other antisemitic tropes. The BVLA also received funding from Willis Carto, the endorsement of George Lincoln Rockwell, and was featured on anti-semitic radio shows. The League led a letter-writing campaign protesting the Health and Human Services grant to Hassan's organizations. This prompted Hassan to file suit against the ADL for $24 million in damages due to alleged defamation and criminal conspiracy. A resulting audit of the BDC's use of funds showed financial mismanagement and irregularities with the organization's bookkeeping.

This scrutiny led to Hassan moving his operations to Columbus, Ohio in the summer of 1971, receiving $25,000 of public funds from Franklin County. The local director of the BDC in Ohio sought the ADL's endorsement of the new initiative, which the League declined to give due to the ties between the Washington organization and the Ohio chapter. The publishing of audit results showing aforementioned mismanagement of funds by the BDC resulted in the withdrawal of the Franklin County grant. Despite this, by December 1971, the BDC was treating addicts in four facilities in Columbus, funded by donations from local businesses as well as a $33,000 emergency grant from the Ohio Department of Health. Their use of a former convent on the campus of St. John the Evangelist Church, next to an active school building, prompted opposition from area residents and parents. In 1973, the facility was only treating 33 addicts, and did not have enough money to take on new patients, leading Columbus City Council to consider eliminating a budget appropriation funding the BDC.

In 1972, Hassan ran for delegate of the District of Columbia's at-large congressional district.

Hassan remained active in Washington D.C., seeking to elect the first African-American President of the United States in the 1984 United States presidential election under the initiative of the Black American Party which he founded. He announced the opening of a new treatment facility in the northeastern section of Washington in 1990. Hassan Jeru-Ahmed died on July 21, 2011.
