= Saint Dominic Church (Columbus, Ohio) =

Catholic church in Columbus, Ohio, US

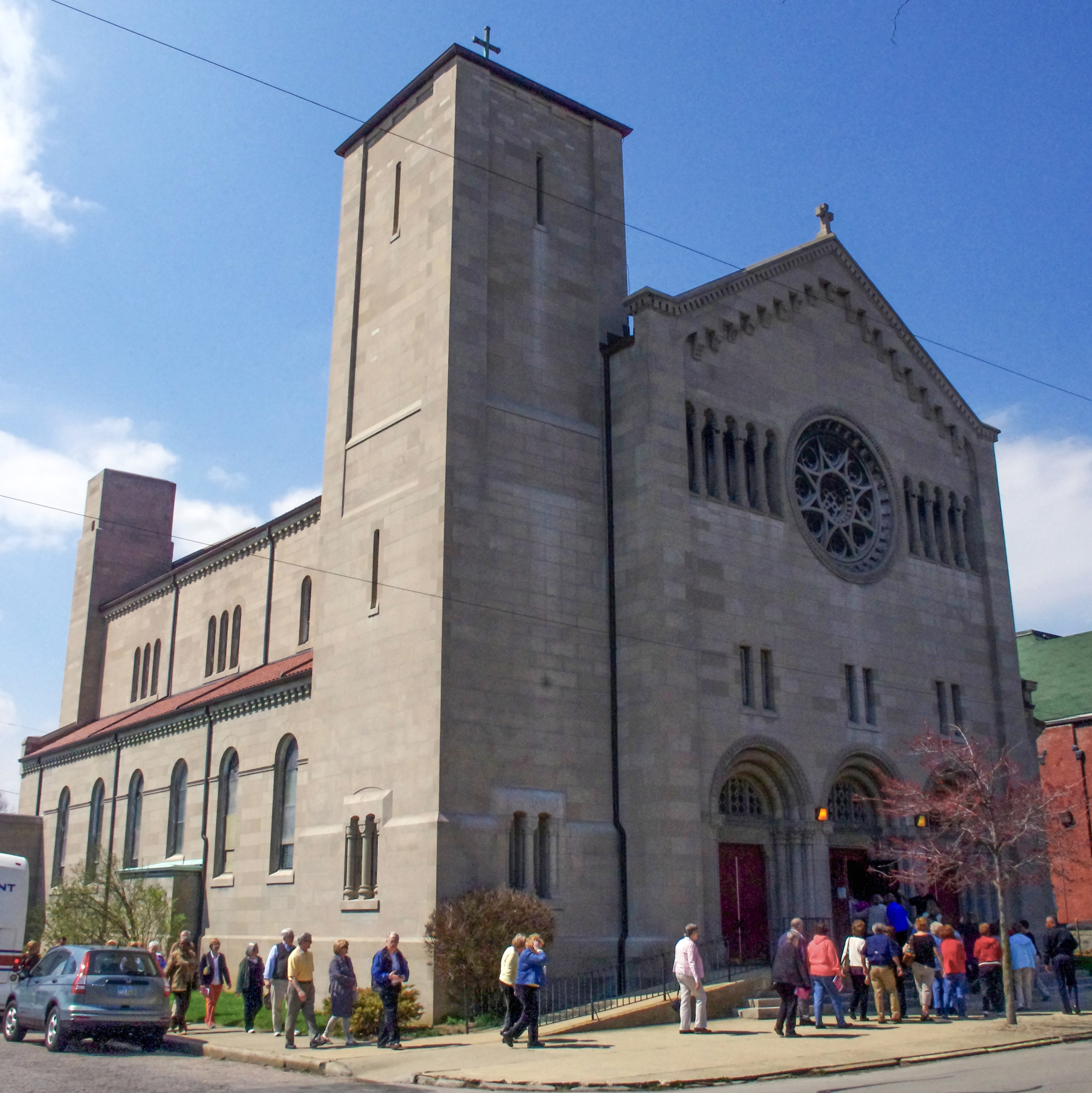
- The church in 2014
- Saint Dominic Church
- 39°58′29″N 82°58′24″W
- Address: 455 North 20th Street; Columbus, Ohio, US
- Denomination: Catholicism

History
- Founded: 1889
- Consecrated: 26 November 1916

Architecture
- Architect(s): John Comes and John Kauzor
- Architectural type: Roman Basilica
- Years built: October 1914–November 1916

Administration
- Diocese: Roman Catholic Diocese of Columbus

Clergy
- Bishop: Earl K. Fernandes

Saint Dominic Church is a Roman Catholic parish church of the Diocese of Columbus in the Mount Vernon neighborhood of Columbus, Ohio, United States. The parish was founded in 1889 and the current Roman Basilica-style church was completed in 1916. In 1957, neighboring Saint Cyprian Church was merged into St. Dominic, as well as the Community of Holy Rosary-Saint John in 2024.

== History ==
=== Founding ===
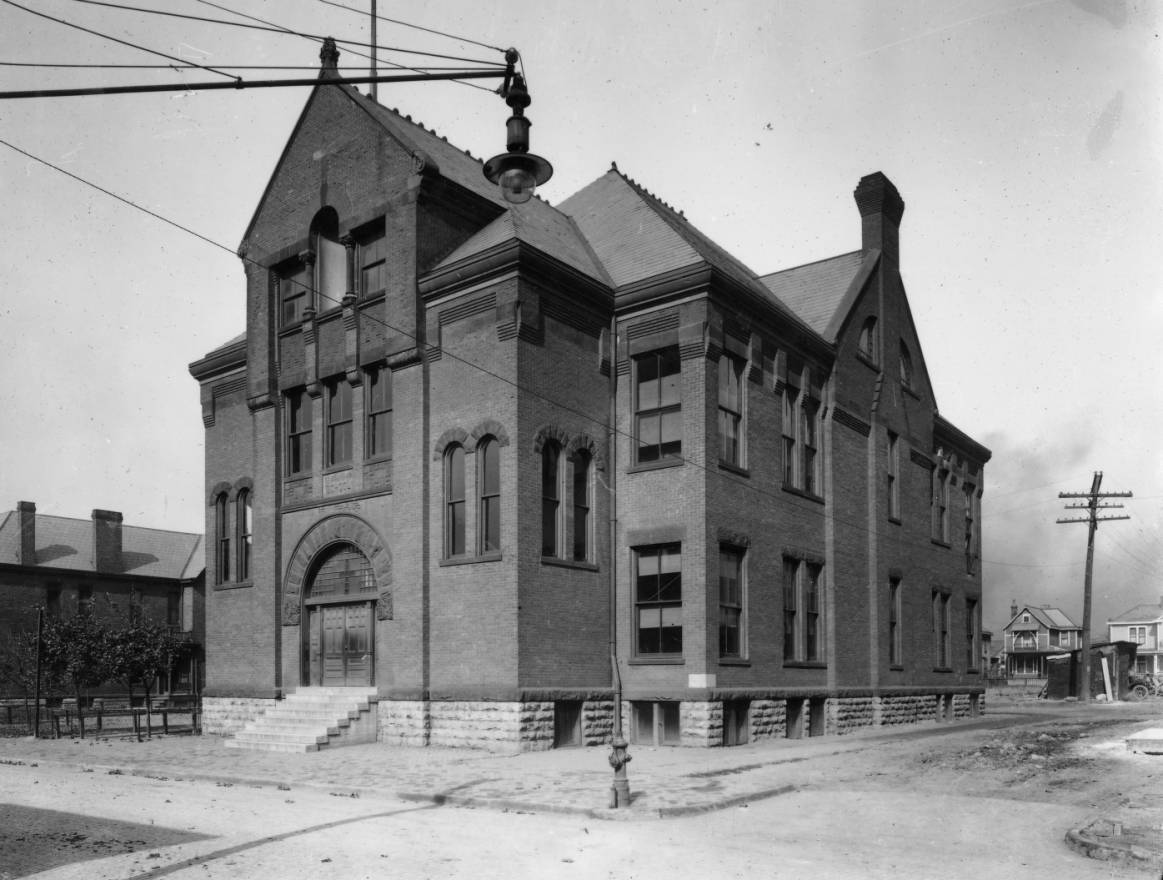
The 1891 combined school and church building which was torn down in 1990.

In the spring of 1889, Fr. Thomas O'Reilly was appointed by John Watterson to organize a Catholic congregation in the northeastern section of the city of Columbus. The previous year, three lots had been purchased at the intersection of Devoise and 20th Streets. The first Mass for the parish was said in Benninghoff Hall on September 1, 1889, at an altar donated by the Sisters of Notre Dame de Namur, with an overflow congregation standing in the rear of the chapel and in the stairwells. Later that month a parochial school was organized in a vacant portion of a nearby public school, serving the 125 pupils of St. Dominic's, with Sisters of St. Joseph from Baden, Pennsylvania teaching. This resulted in controversy due to anti-Catholicism in the area, which then in turn prompted Washington Gladden, a prominent Congregationalist minister, to speak out in favor of the Catholic school. That following November, the parish began to fundraise for a new building housing both a chapel and classrooms, the cornerstone of which was laid by James Hartley on August 17, 1890. On February 2, 1891, Bishop Hartley dedicated the completed building and said Mass there, allowing the schoolchildren to vacate the public school building. In 1895 a Queen Anne-style pastor's residence was constructed and six years later a convent was constructed for the sisters serving in the school.

=== Construction of current church and merger with St. Cyprian ===
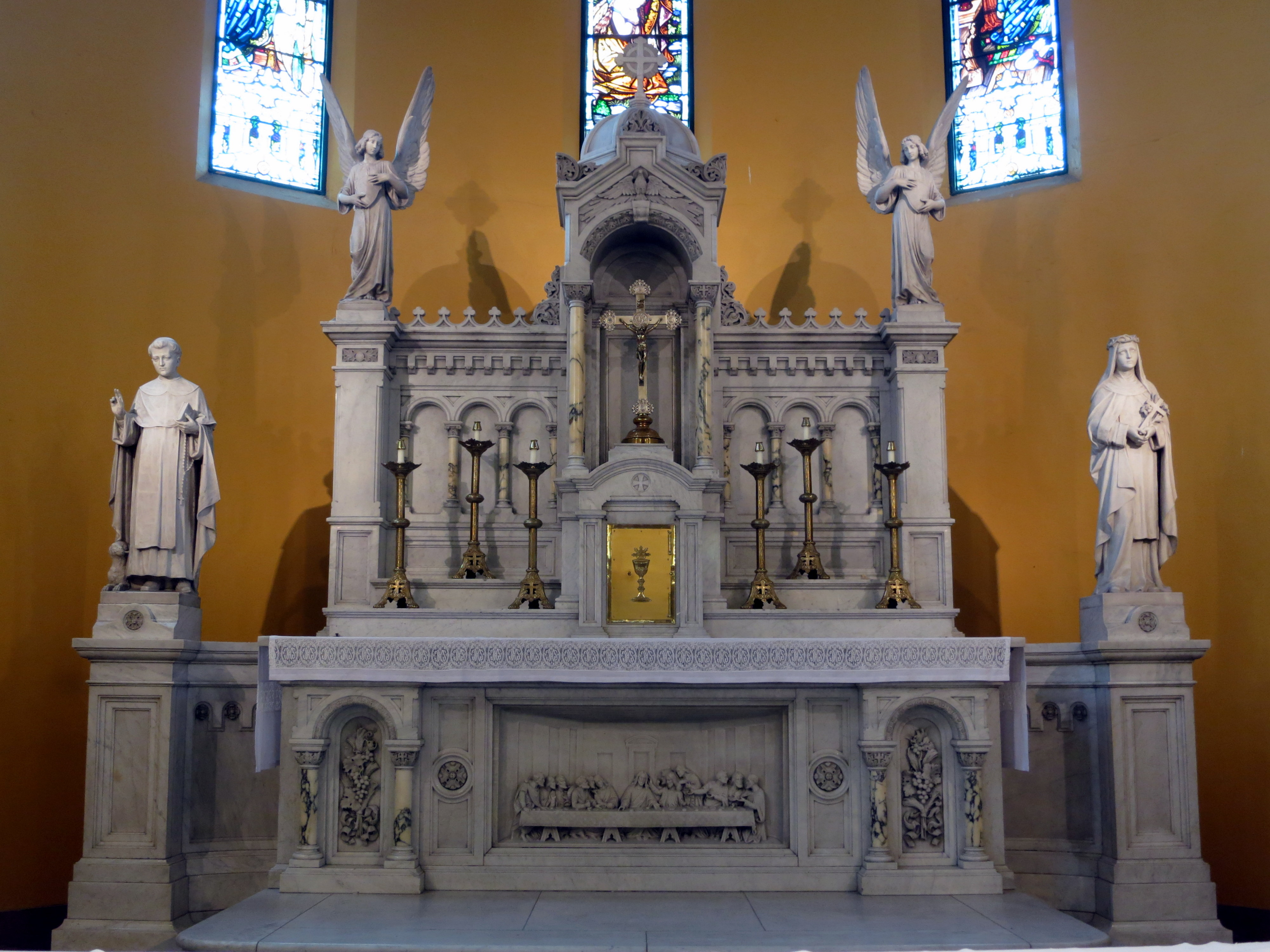
The high altar and tabernacle of the 1914 church.

In October 1914, ground was broken for a new dedicated church building with D.W. McGrath serving as contractor and the cornerstone laid on May 9, 1915, by Bishop Hartley. Work began on the superstructure designed by John Comes and John Kauzor of Pittsburgh the spring of 1915. The church was dedicated by Hartley on November 26, 1916, with Bishop Peter Muldoon of the Diocese of Rockford preaching the sermon for the Mass. The exterior of the church is built out of Bedford stone, the interior columns out of polished granite, and the altars and altar rails from Carrara marble. The cost of the construction of the church, school, rectory, and convent totalled $140,000. The same year as the completion of the church, the Sisters of St. Joseph were recalled to Pennsylvania and were replaced by Sisters of Charity of Nazareth.

Due to the moving of the Pennsylvania Railroad's facilities in the area, many families moved away in the late 1910s and early 1920s, and decline in the population of the parish continued through the following decades. in 1924 the parish school had an enrollment of 375, a number which dropped to 206 by 1943. The parish school also operated a high school department from 1925 to 1926, as well as from 1937 to 1944. From 1954 to 1957, the parish was administered by the Congregation of the Immaculate Heart of Mary. Beginning in the early 1940s, the congregation became predominantly African-American, a trend that continued when neighboring Saint Cyprian Church—founded for black Catholics in 1912—was merged into St. Dominic in 1957. Previously, the parish had been made up of Irish and then Italian immigrants. The Sisters of the Blessed Sacrament, who had taught at St. Cyprian, took over the school at St. Dominic and the Sisters of Charity moved to the newly opened St. Matthias school. During this time, the church hosted conferences concerning the welfare of black Catholics, as well as the Catholic Interracial Council of Columbus. A fire at the 75-year-old school building caused $20,000 of damage in July 1960, but the damage was repaired and the school rededicated by auxiliary bishop Edward Hettinger in October.

=== Demographic change; School merger and closure ===
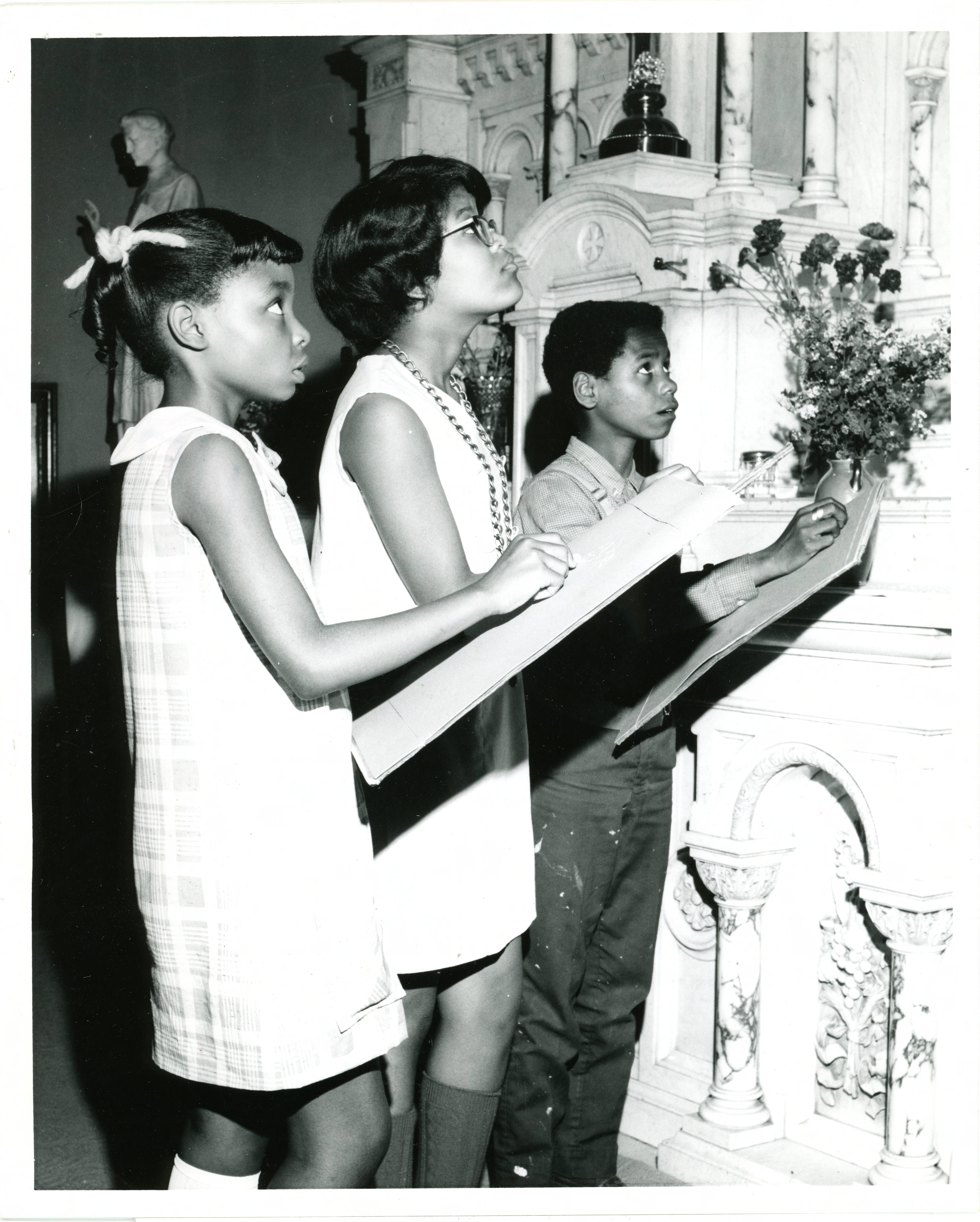
Black schoolchildren practicing drawing inside St. Dominic, 1970.

In 1970, St. Dominic School was consolidated with the parochial schools of the then-separate neighboring parishes of Holy Rosary and St. John, and the Sisters of the Blesed Sacrament ceased teaching at the St. Dominic campus. The consolidated school was named Pope John XXIII School, and the St. Dominic school building housed grades 4–6. Due to declining enrollment and staffing cuts, Pope John XXIII School closed following the 1983 school year. This closure, along with white flight and a lack of success in Catholic outreach to the predominantly-black neighborhood, all lead to declining attendance at the church in the following years.

During the pastorate of Fr. Thomas Petry, from 1987 to 1999, cultural adaptations such as African dress and Gospel music and jazz settings of the Mass were introduced, and the church hosted Vespers commemorating Martin Luther King Jr. as well as Juneteenth celebrations. Black Catholics from other areas of Columbus, including the suburbs, chose to travel to St. Dominic for Mass. Despite hopes of refurbishing the closed parish school building for alternate use in the late 1980s, the building was torn down in 1990. Aaron Diehl, an award-winning American jazz artist, grew up playing the organ at St. Dominic in the early to mid-1990s, beginning at the age of 7. A 2018 natural gas explosion across the street from the campus caused $200,000 of damage to the church and rectory, prompting the demolition of the rectory the following year. In 2024, the neighboring, also predominantly-black parish of Holy Rosary-St. John was merged into St. Dominic by Earl K. Fernandes, with St. Dominic serving as the sole worship site of the combined parish. Holy Rosary and St. John had been merged in 1979, and Holy Rosary Church sold to a Baptist congregation in 1983. As of July 8, 2025, Fr. Jude Esua Fongouck is the administrator of the parish.
