= Holy Rosary Church (Columbus, Ohio) =

Former Catholic church building in Columbus, Ohio, USA

- Rock of Faith Baptist Church
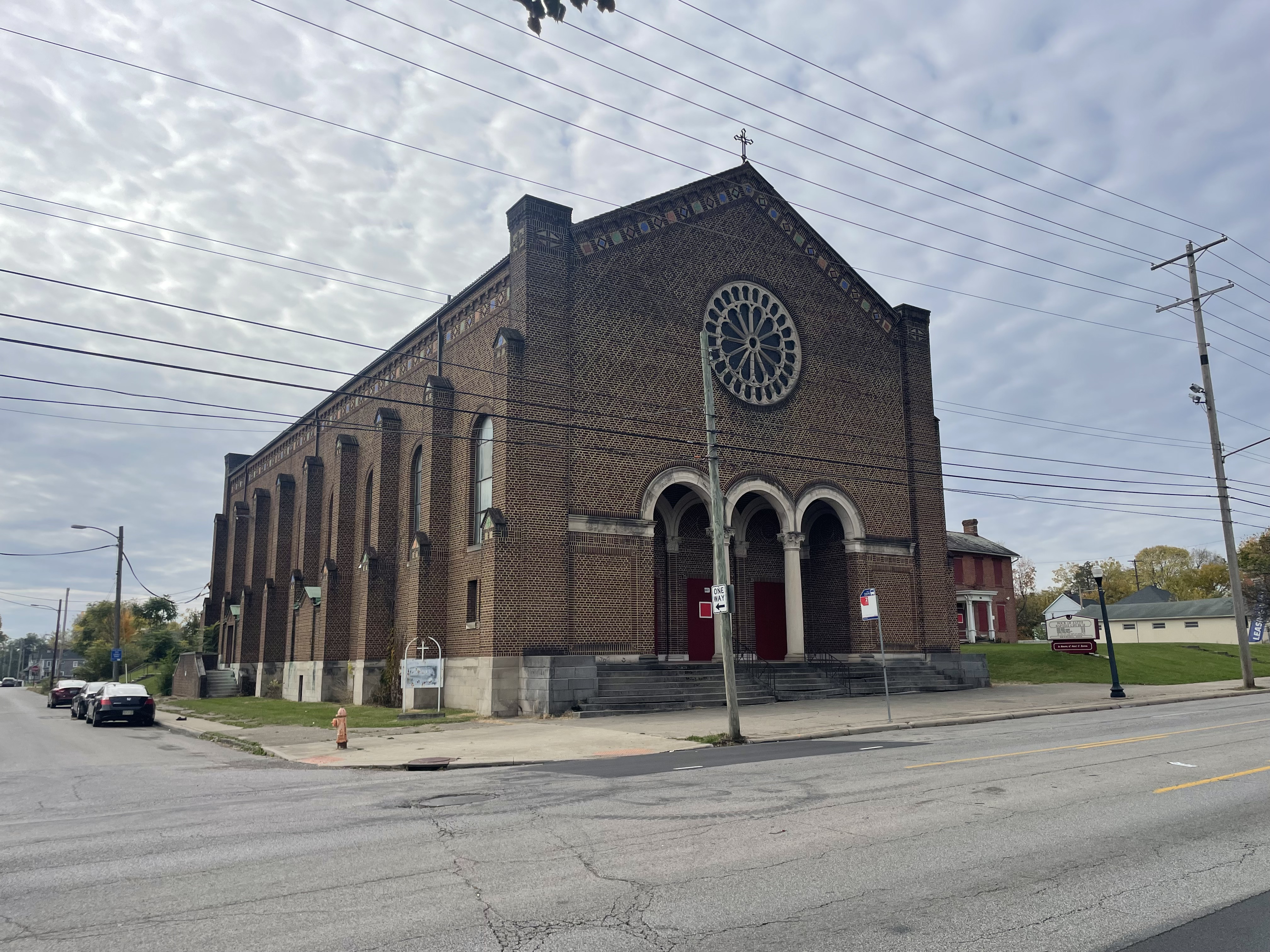
- Holy Rosary Church
- 39.9571°N 82.9547°W
- Address: 1667 East Main Street; Columbus, OH, 43205
- Denomination: Baptist
- Previous denomination: Catholic

History
- Founded: 1 May 1905
- Founder: Francis William Howard
- Dedicated: 2 February 1916
- Other dedication: 18 September 1983

Architecture
- Architect: Harvey Hiestand
- Style: Lombard
- Years built: 1913-1916
- Groundbreaking: 13 April 1913
- Construction cost: $70,000
- Closed: 1 June 1979

Administration
- Parish: St. Dominic

- Holy Rosary Roman Catholic Church Complex
- Location: 1651 E. Main St. (rectory); 1667 E. Main St. (church); 498 Berkeley Rd. (high school); 1640 E. Mound St. (convent)
- Area: 3.18 acres (1.29 ha)
- NRHP reference No.: SG100010473
- Added to NRHP: 5 July 2024

Holy Rosary Church was a Catholic parish church of the Diocese of Columbus, located on the east side of the city of Columbus, between the neighborhoods of Franklin Park and Driving Park, that has served a Baptist congregation since 1983. The Catholic parish was founded in 1905, the current Northern Italian-Lombard building completed in 1916 with Renaissance Revival elements added to the interior in the 1950s. In 1979, it was merged into the neighboring congregation of St. John the Evangelist Church, which in turn was merged with St. Dominic Church in 2024. The Holy Rosary campus was acquired by Rock of Faith Baptist Church in 1983, and plans for its redevelopment into an event center and housing were released in 2024. The campus is the site of a residence dating to the 1850s, which was used as a stop on the Underground Railroad.

The parish also operated a primary school from 1906 to 1983 and a high school from 1924 to 1966. The high school graduated over 2,700 students during its time of operation. The campus, including church, rectory, high school building, and convent, was listed on the National Register of Historic Places in 2024.

== History ==
=== Background and St. Vincent Quasi-Parish ===
Following the founding of St. Vincent's Orphan Asylum by Bishop Sylvester Rosecrans in 1875, local Catholics in the area began to attend Mass and receive baptism in the orphanage chapel rather than travel the two or more miles to St. Joseph Cathedral, Saint Patrick or Holy Cross Church. Between 1875 and 1877, there are 18 recorded baptisms at St. Vincent and the majority of them were local residents rather than orphans living at St. Vincent. Most of these residents were of German descent and had settled west of Alum Creek. A freestanding chapel was constructed and completed by 1885, and hosted two Masses on Holy days of obligation and Sundays. By 1902 the quasi-parish had grown such that it was a burden to Fr. John Goldschmidt, the chaplain of St. Vincent orphanage and a building fund was begun at St. Vincent the following year. Bishop Henry Moeller established the congregational boundaries as Broad Street to the north, the Franklin County line to the east, Livingston Avenue to the south, and Winner Avenue to the east.

=== Founding ===
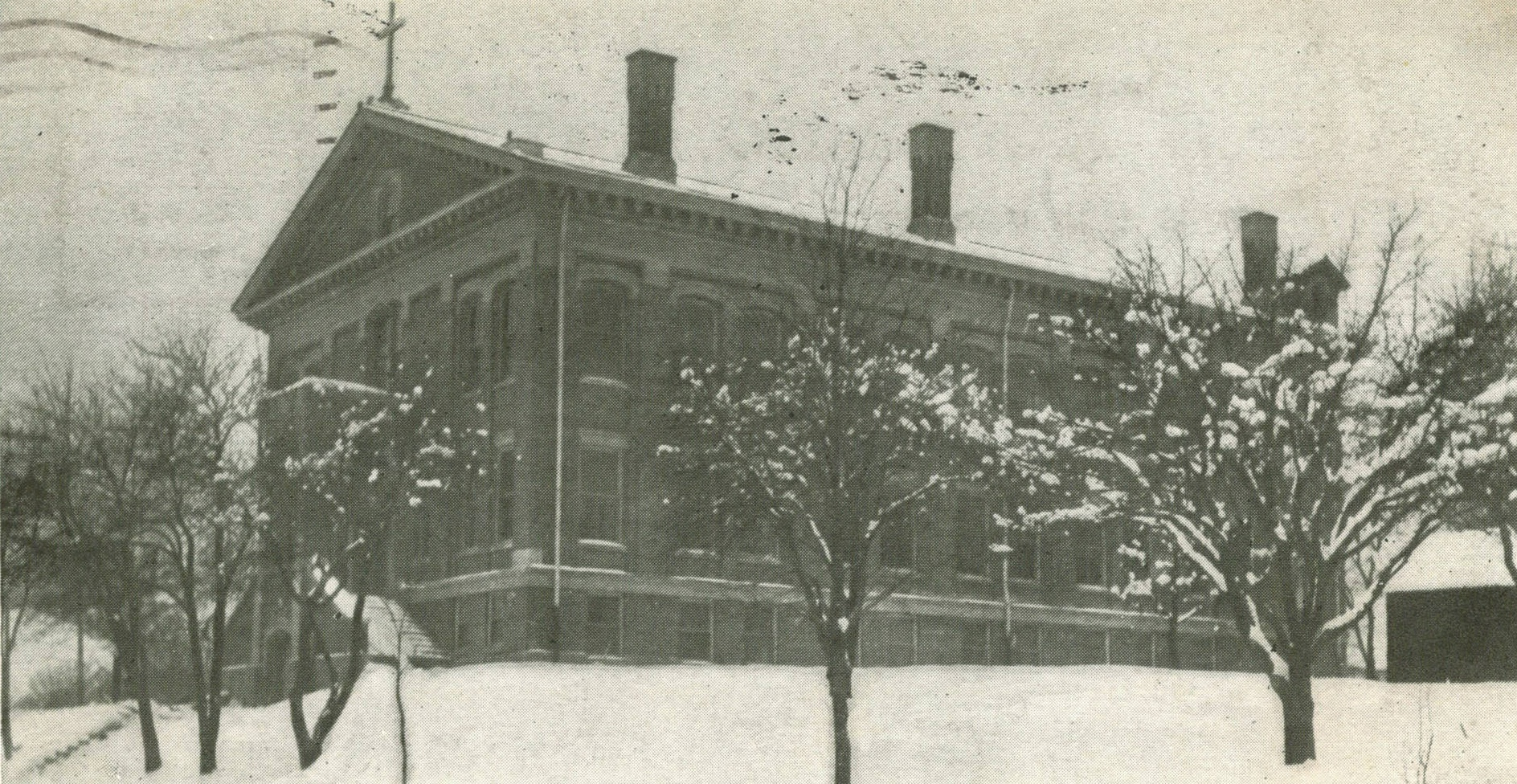
The 1906 combined church and school building, which was demolished in 1973.

On May 1, 1905, Bishop James Hartley established Holy Rosary Parish and appointed Fr. Francis Howard as its first pastor, commissioning him to build a church and a school on plot of land on the corner of Main and Seymour streets that had been purchased for $7300. This property had an existing I-house on it that had been built around 1850 and had served as a stop on the Underground Railroad. It had been owned by a William Armstrong prior to being sold to the church. The congregation was founded to serve the growing suburbs on the Near East Side of the city of Columbus. Plans for a combined church and school building were drawn by Columbus architect David Riebel, and ground was broken on July 26, 1905. The cornerstone was laid in front of a crowd of 5,000 on October 1, 1905 by Msgr. Francis Xavier Specht and on the feast of the Annunciation, March 25, the building was dedicated by Bishop Hartley. This building cost $40,000. A parochial school served by the Sisters of St. Francis of Penance and Christian Charity, also known as the Stella Niagra Franciscans, was founded with 170 pupils on September 8, 1906. The first class of four children graduated from the grammar school on June 30, 1906.

=== Current church ===
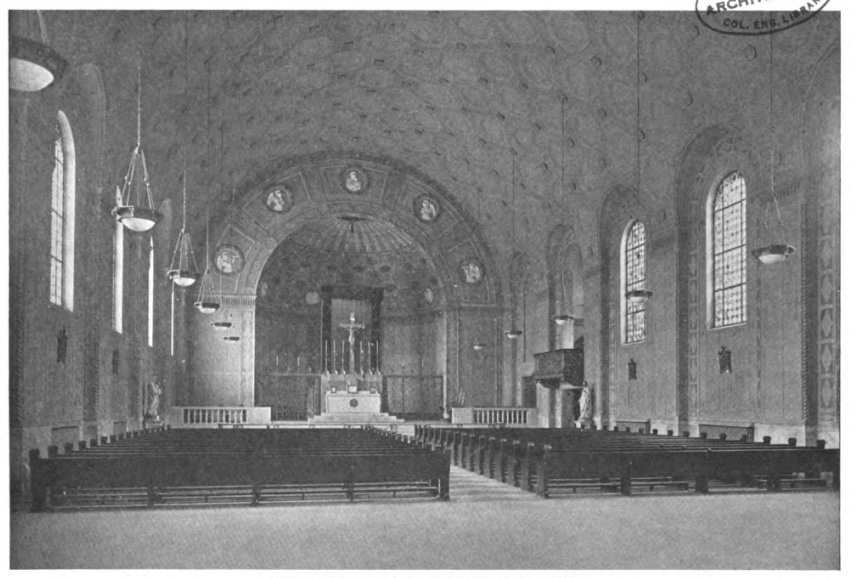
The interior of Holy Rosary upon its completion in 1916.

In 1910, discussion concerning the building of a new, purpose-built church began among parishioners, and Fr. Howard announced the beginning of work for this effort on New Year's Day of 1913. Ground was broken for the building on April 13, 1913 but work did not begin until November of that year. The cornerstone of the church was laid by Hartley on May 24, 1914 and the roof and brickwork was completed by that November. Harvey Heistand and Gordon & Kaelber were the architects for the building, which was designed in the Lombard architectural style and modeled partly after Santo Stefano, Bologna. The exterior is constructed of diaper-patterned brick accented with colored tile and topped with red tile roofing, with a campanile on the western side of the building. The construction cost approximately $70,000. Fr. Howard would often inspect the work with opera glasses to ensure it was completed properly. The church was completed and consecrated on February 2, 1916 by Bishop Hartley and Mass began to be offered in the church regularly later that month. The primary altar of the church was consecrated by Hartley on May 7 of the same year. Following the completion of the new church, the parish consisted of 260 families and 1200 people and the school had an enrollment of 240. In 1923, Fr. Howard was named bishop of the Diocese of Covington and replaced by Fr. John Murphy.

=== Holy Rosary High School, partition of St. Catharine and Christ the King ===
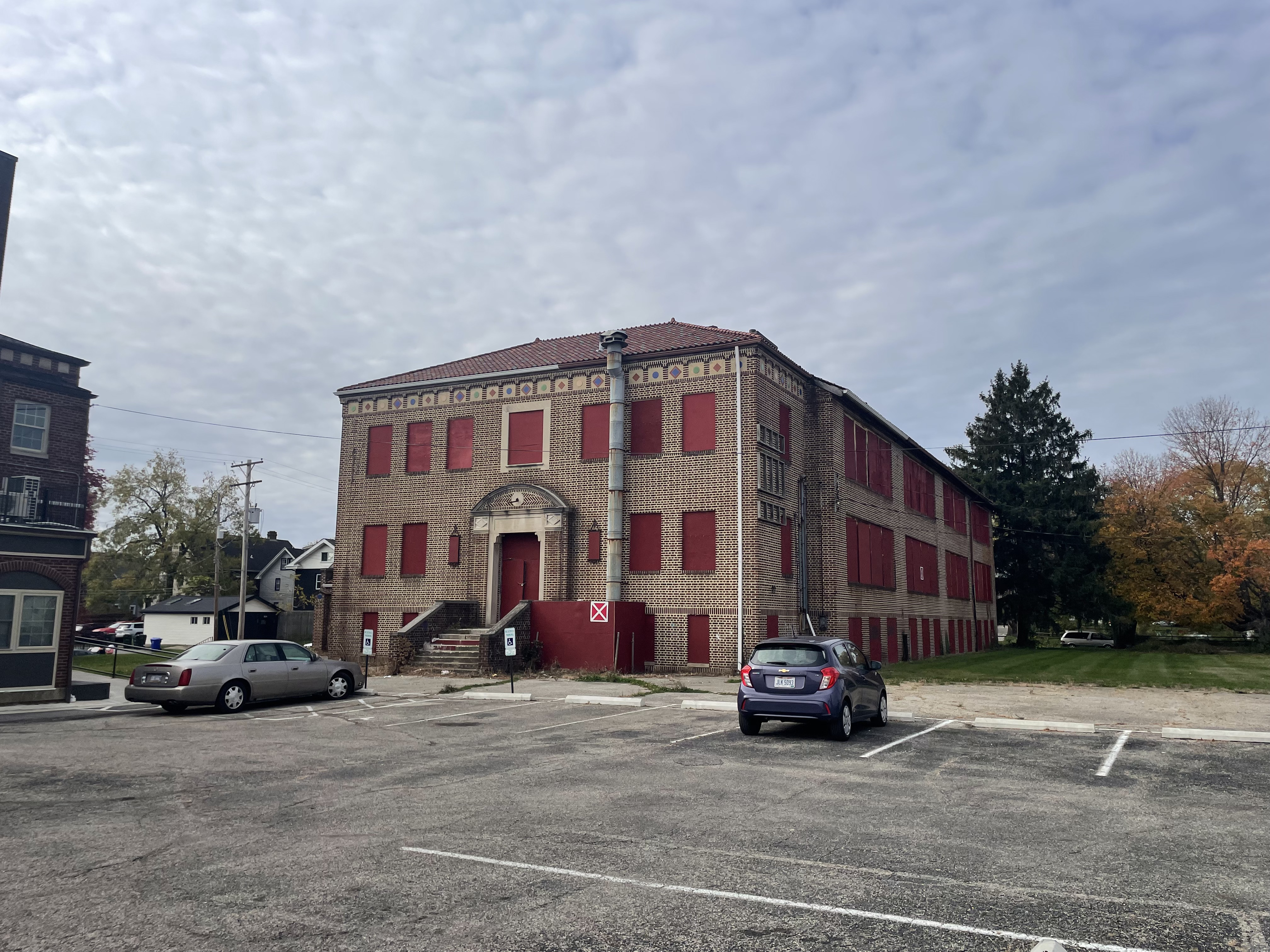
The Holy Rosary High School building in 2025.

Following a 1918 campaign to pay off the parish debt, a resulting surplus of money allowed for the establishment of a parochial high school which would serve most of the east side of Columbus, as none of the existing Catholic high schools (Sacred Heart for girls on the north side, St. Mary on the south side, and Holy Family on the west side) served this area. The first class of freshmen entered in 1924 and were taught in extra space in the elementary school building. The parish purchased additional surrounding lots of land in 1921 and 1925, and broke ground on a dedicated high school building, again designed by Heistand, on November 4, 1926. The building, situated on the south side of the property was completed in 1927 and dedicated by Hartley on August 21. In May of 1931, James Hartley partitioned the territory of Holy Rosary east of Alum Creek and north of Main Street and made into the new parish of St. Catharine, serving the suburbs of Bexley and Eastmoor. By this time, Holy Rosary had over 700 students in the elementary and high school and 3,100 parishioners. Despite the split of the eastern territory of the parish, by 1944 the parish had over 800 students in its schools and 3,400 parishioners. In January of 1946, Christ the King Parish was split off from Holy Rosary by Michael Ready, bounded by Alum Creek, Main Street, Refugee Road, and the Franklin County line, and serving the neighborhoods of Berwick, Reynoldsburg, and southern Bexley.

=== Postwar expansion and decline ===
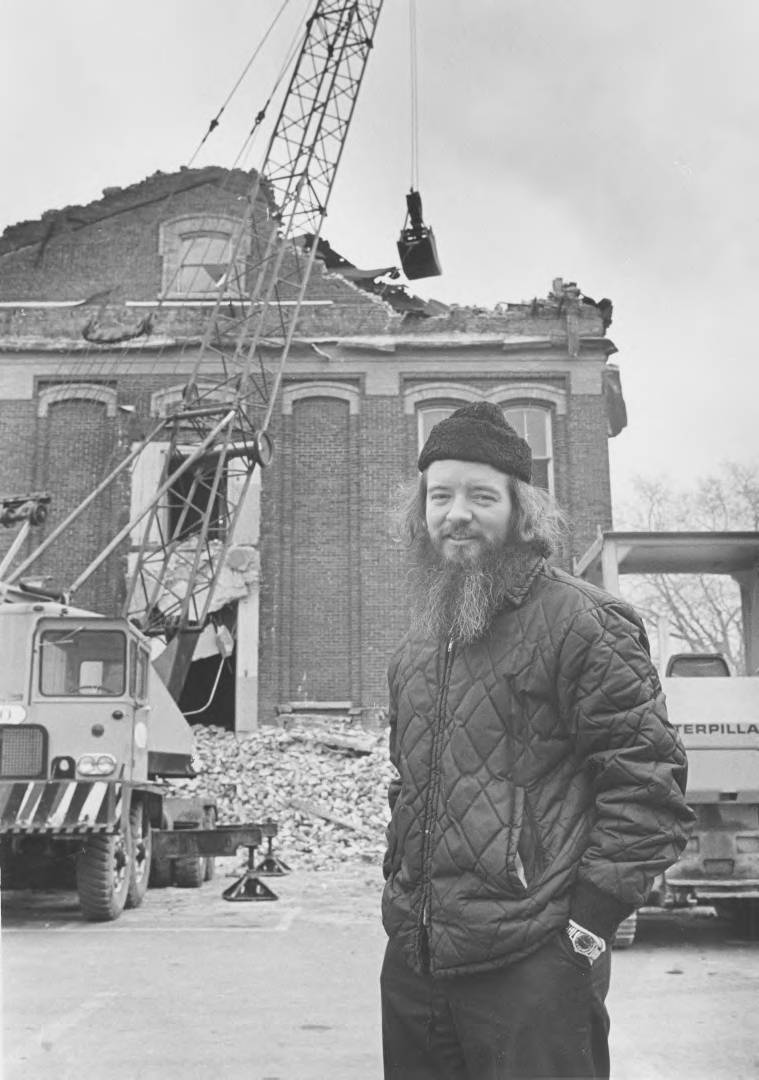
Fr. Bill Metzger of the Diocese of Columbus looks on as Holy Rosary's 1906 school building is demolished in 1973.

A new altar arrangement for the sanctuary at Holy Rosary was introduced in September of 1952, with the addition of a baldachin and marble pillars in the Renaissance Revival style. The Stella Niagra Franciscans teaching at both the elementary and high schools had resided at St. Vincent Orphanage since coming to the parish in 1906, walking the three blocks to the schools daily. In January 1950, Bp. Ready asked Fr. Harry Connolly, the pastor, to explore building a convent for the sisters on the grounds of the parish. Ground was broken two years later and the building was blessed by Hartley in January of 1953. In 1953, Holy Rosary High School was admitted to the North Central Association of Colleges and Schools, being one of only four other diocesan secondary schools to gain this accreditation. At the time of the parish's celebration of its golden jubilee in 1955 it had produced 22 priests and 43 religious sisters in its 50 years of existence. In 1959, the parish also had the most seminarians of any parish in the diocese, with seven coming from Holy Rosary. In 1963, enrollment at Holy Rosary High School had declined to 185 students, drawn from six different parochial schools. Student numbers continued to decline and Holy Rosary High School graduated its last class in June of 1966. The elementary school moved into the high school facility the following year, and the original 1906 school building was demolished in 1973. Remaining high school students transferred to Fr. Wherle High School. In 1970, Holy Rosary Elementary merged with the schools of nearby St. John the Evangelist and St. Dominic Church to form John XXIII Elementary which served primarily a primarily African-American and Protestant student body. The Holy Rosary building housed grades 7 and 8. John XXIII School closed in 1983 due to budget deficits and the Holy Rosary school building was sold to Rock of Faith in 1991.

=== Merger into St. John and closure ===
Holy Rosary's membership had significantly declined following the construction of Interstate 70 through downtown Columbus, which cut off the southern portion of the parish territory and displaced over 100 families of the parish. White flight lead to neighborhoods being inhabited by mostly non-Catholic African-Americans, and deferred maintenance in the Holy Rosary building lead to Masses returning to being said at St. Vincent orphanage. In February of 1979, auxiliary bishop George Fulcher announced that Holy Rosary and St. John were being given particular attention during evaluations of possible mergers and closures of parishes in the central part of the city of Columbus. In May of the same year, bishop Edward Herrmann approved the merger of Holy Rosary into neighboring St. John Church effective June 1, 1979, citing high maintenance costs and a Sunday Mass attendance of 75. The merged parish was known as the Community of Holy Rosary-St. John, and worshipped at St. John. This resulting congregation was merged into Saint Dominic Church in January 2024, and St. John church closed.

=== Rock of Faith Baptist Church ===
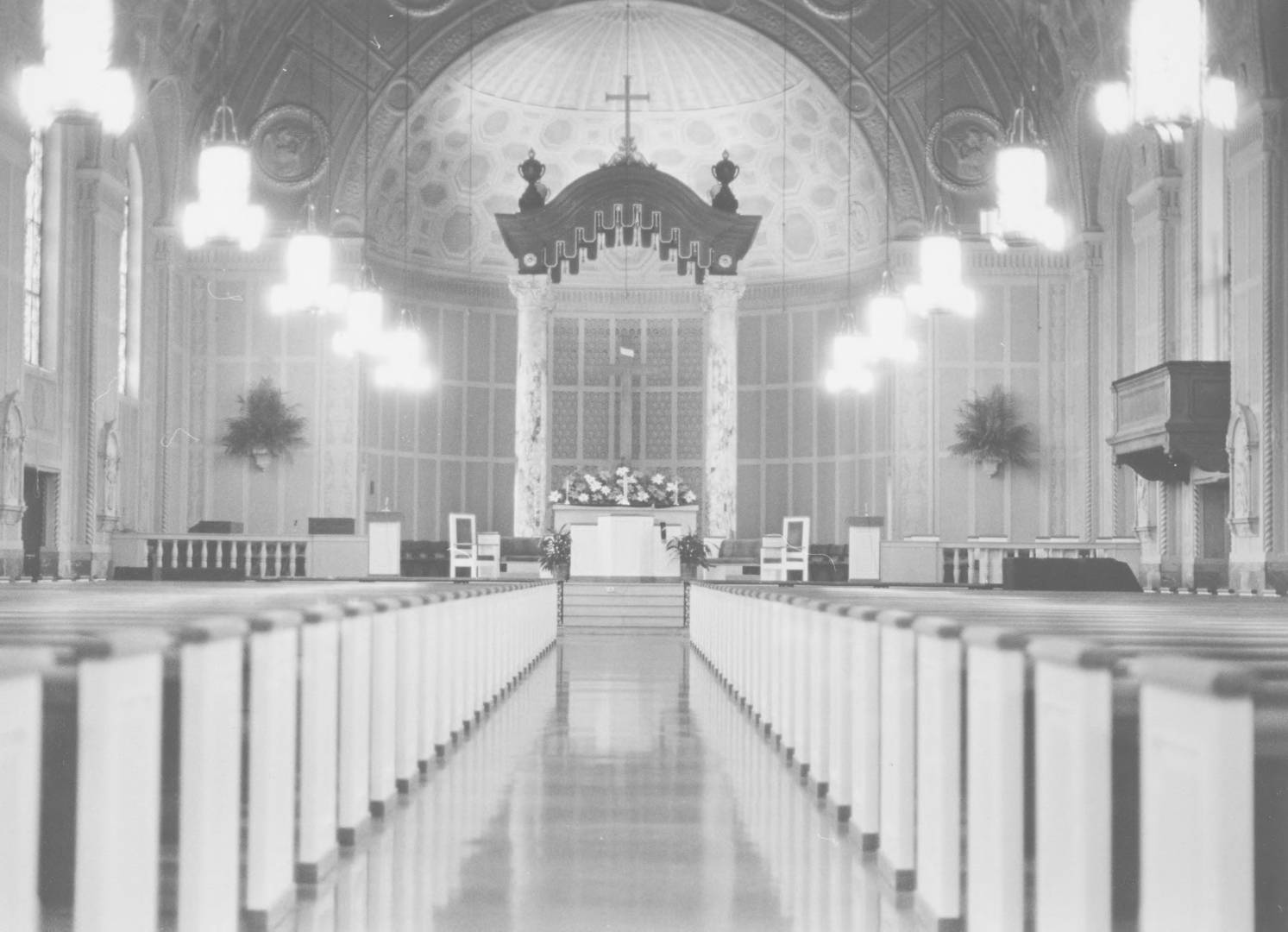
The interior of Holy Rosary following renovations by Rock of Faith Baptist Church.

The church building was sold to a Baptist congregation, Rock of Faith Baptist Church, in September of 1983. Rock of Faith dedicated the new church on Sunday, September 18. The church founded Diversified Community Services, a nonprofit corporation working in urban renewal and developing affordable housing, especially for people with developmental disabilities. DCS' techniques in operating halfway houses attracted some critiques, comparisons to boot camp, and allegations of civil rights violations. Rock of Faith also hosted performances of George Frideric Handel's Messiah in 1987 and a performance about the African-American experience of AIDS in 1989. In the 2010s the main church building fell into disrepair and the space was closed, and was designated as an endangered building by Columbus Landmarks in 2018. The high school building had been similarly designated the prior year. The former convent building was turned into apartments in 2019. In 2022, a real estate developer based in Hilliard purchased the property for $200,000 in an effort to revitalize the area, and invested $450,000 in maintaining the church building in hopes of redeveloping it into an event and performance space, while keeping it open for religious use. The church, rectory, high school, and convent were all listed on the National Register of Historic Places in July of 2024. In June 2026 the high school building was demolished, with developers stating the property would eventually house mixed-use residential and commercial spaces.

== Gallery ==
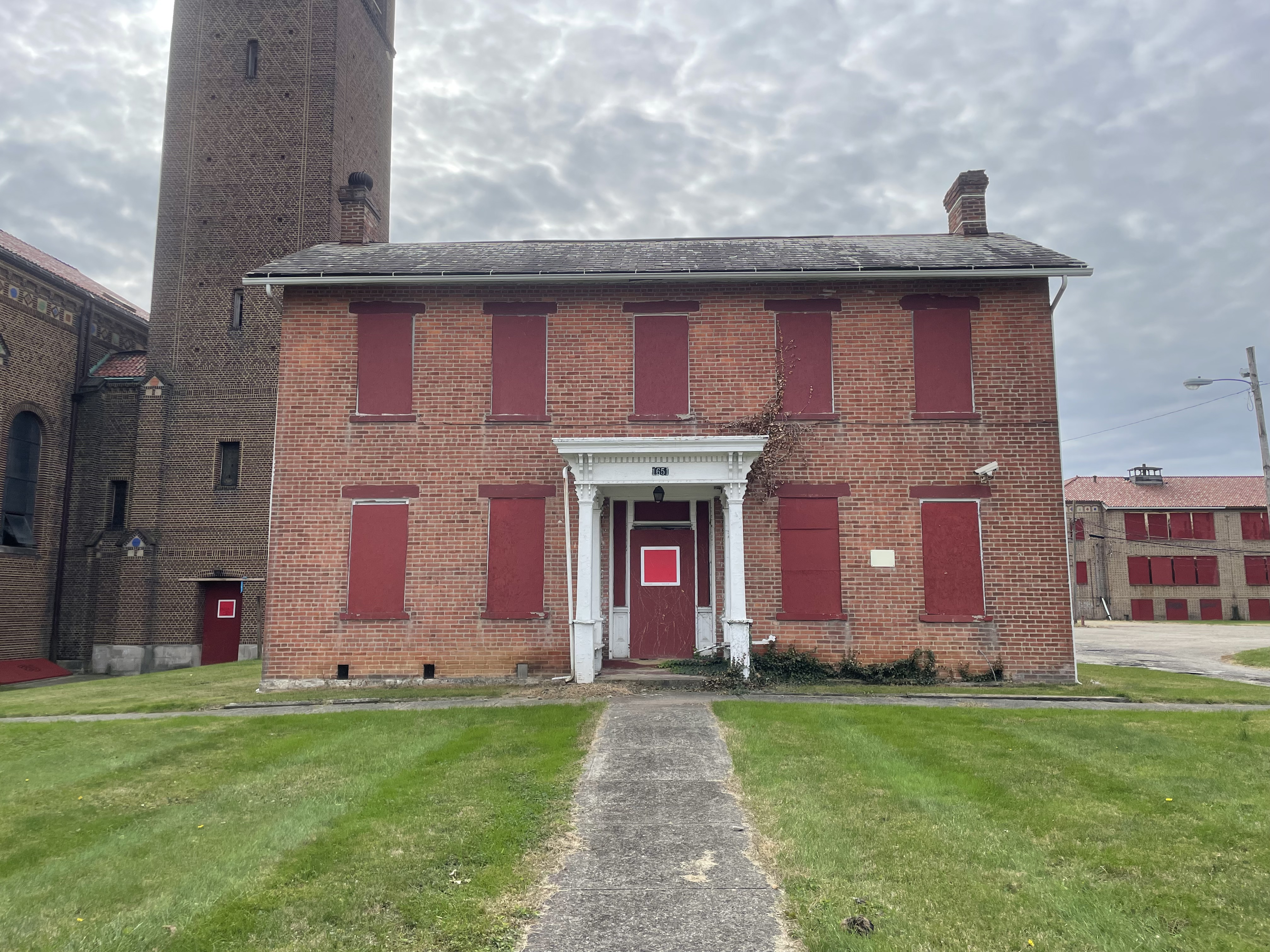
This circa 1840 I-house was the first building constructed on the Holy Rosary property and went on to serve as the parish rectory.

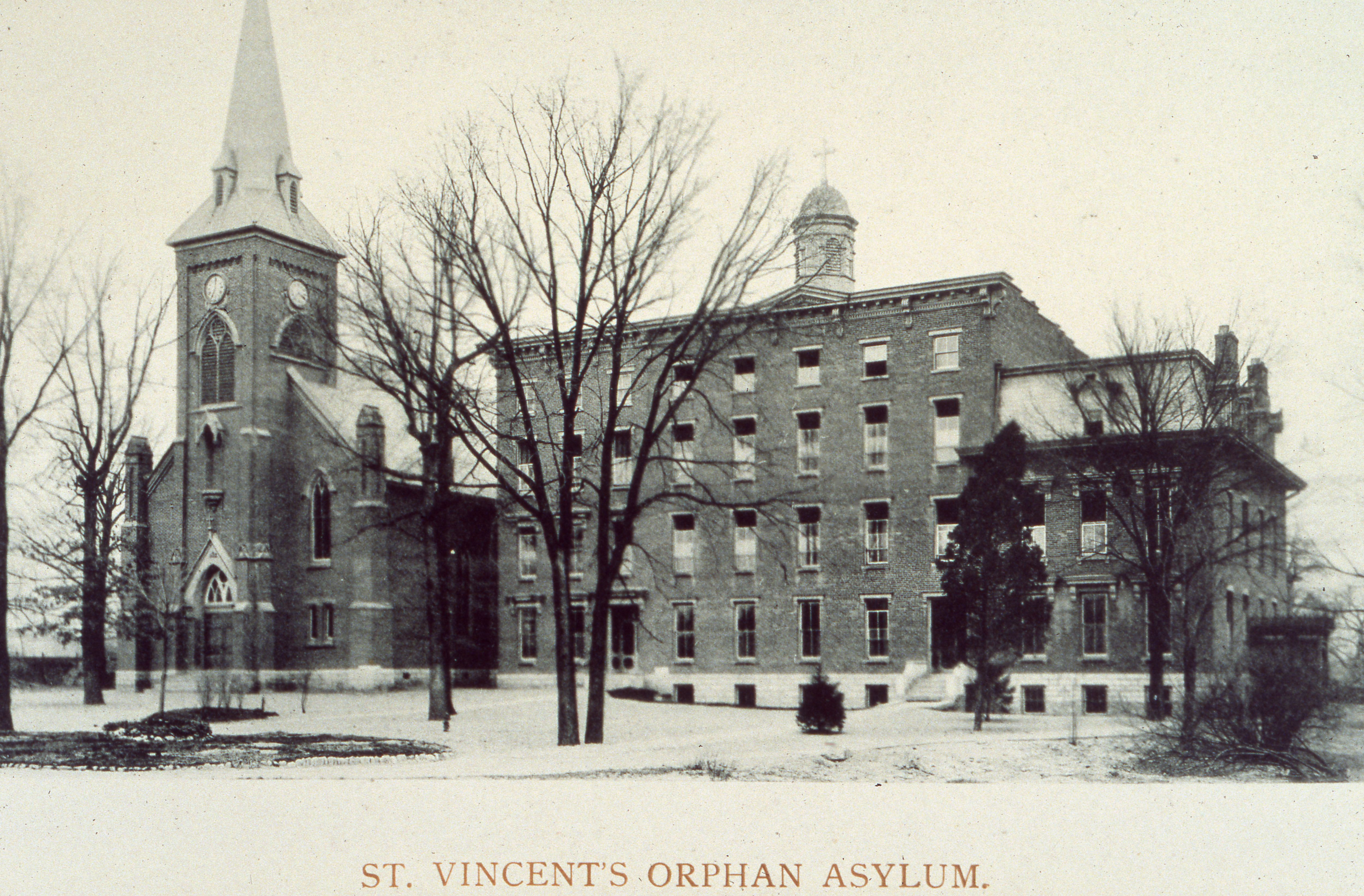
The congregation that would become Holy Rosary initially met at St. Vincent Orphanage from the late 1800s to 1905.

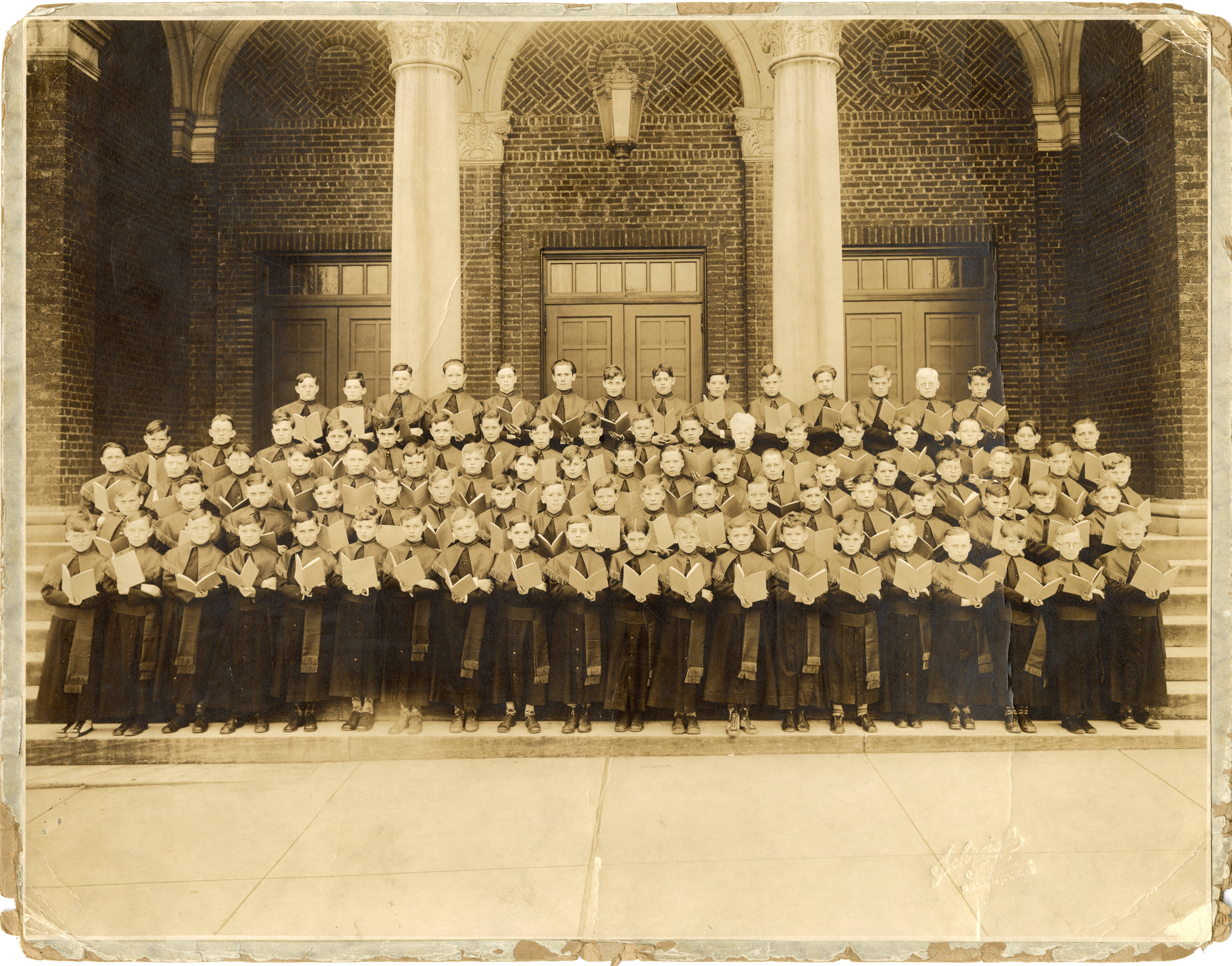
Choirboys at Holy Rosary circa 1930

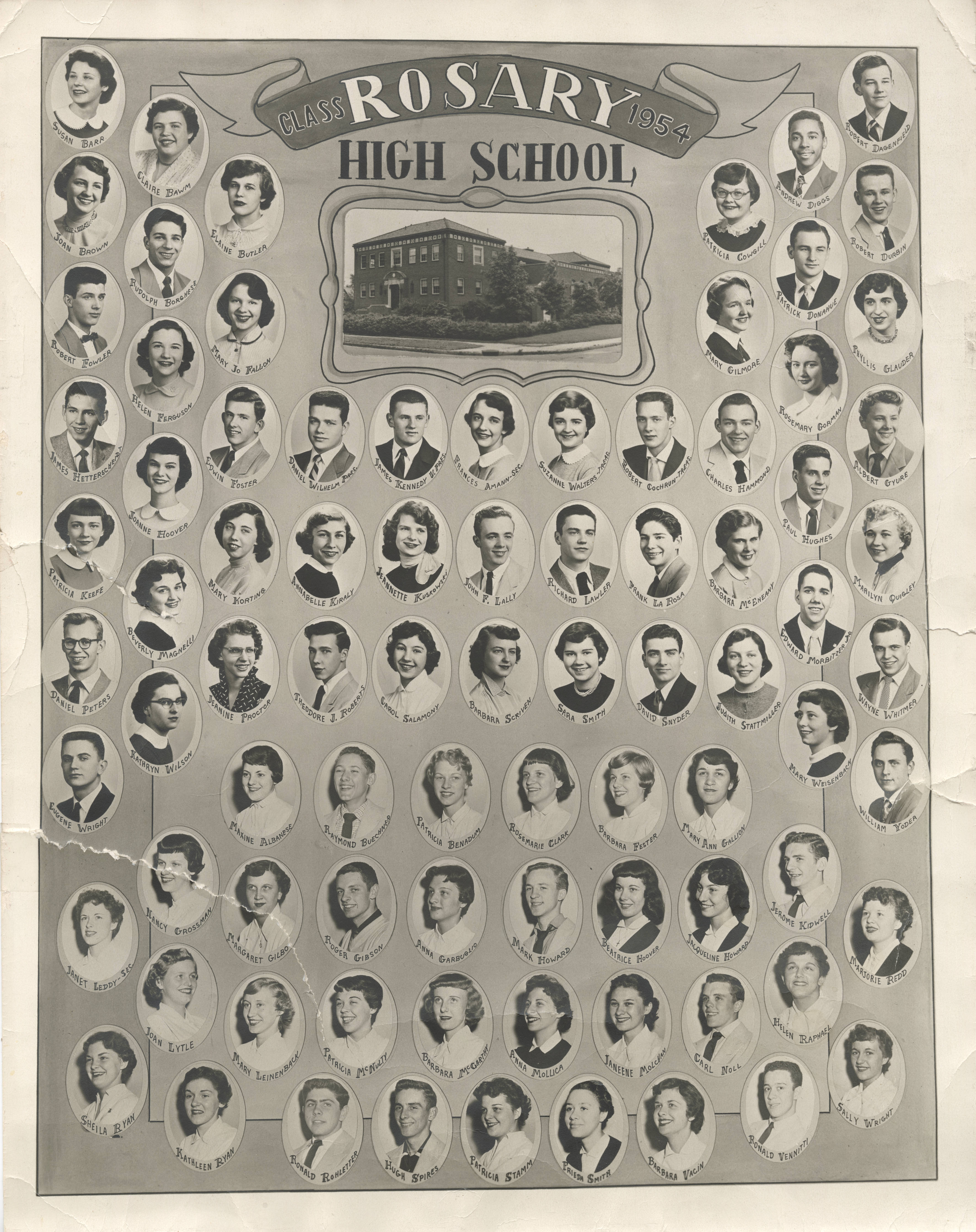
Holy Rosary High School composite from 1954

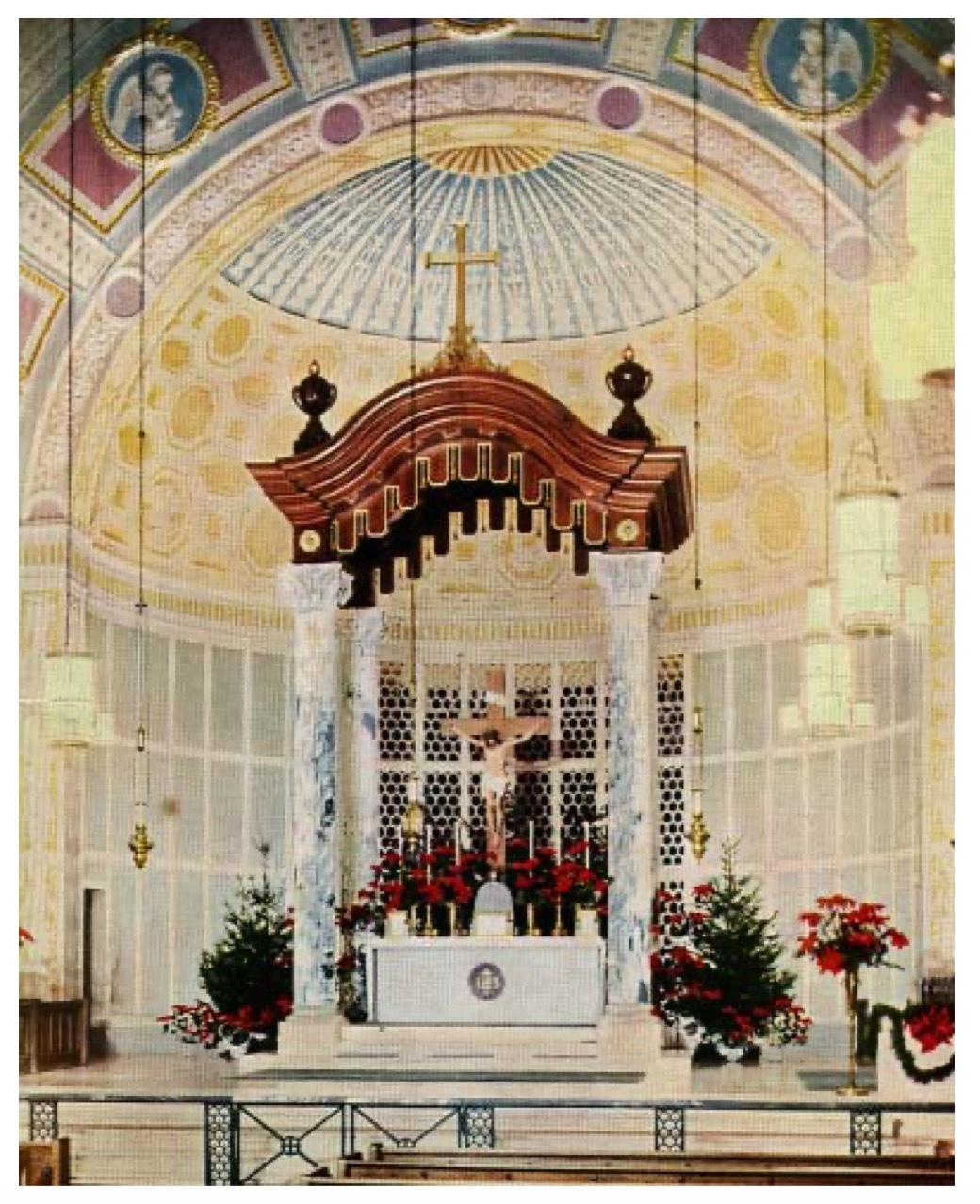
The sanctuary of Holy Rosary following 1952 renovations that added a baldachin.
