= Prior Foster =

African American educator (born c. 17989)

- Born: c. 1799; Pennsylvania, United States
- Died: Unknown
- Occupations: Abolitionist, Educator

Prior Foster, born in 1799 in Pennsylvania, was a Black abolitionist and conductor of The Underground Railroad in Coshocton, Ohio. At a young age, Foster moved to Coshocton, where he lived for more than three decades. As a young boy, he received a solicitor's education. Foster owned several properties in Coshocton and surrounding towns, one of which was his double shanty home located in Harbaugh Corner in Coshocton County. Later in his life, Foster founded of The Woodstock Manual Labor Institute in Lenawee County, Michigan, which ran successfully for about a decade.

== The Underground Railroad in Coshocton and Ohio ==
Ohio had many Underground Railroad routes—in part, because of its geographic location. It bordered Kentucky, where slavery was legal, and Lake Erie, through which freedom seekers could travel to safety in Canada. Coshocton County, Ohio, was part of the Muskingum River Underground Railroad Corridor. Four Underground Railroad routes converged in Coshocton, where the Tuscarawas River and Walhonding River join to become the Muskingum River. From Roscoe Village in Coshocton, freedom seekers would often take the Walhonding Canal and move from station to station along the Ohio and Erie Canal until they reached Lake Erie.

Even though Ohio was never technically a slave state, the Black Laws that were enacted in Ohio in 1802, 1804, and 1807 were highly restrictive of Black people's rights and freedoms. They were created in response to freedom seekers either seeking asylum in the state or passing through on their way to freedom—hence, the Underground Railroad activity. The 1804 laws stated that a $10 to $50 fine would be issued to anyone helping freedom seekers in any way. Additionally, if someone were to help a Black person leave Ohio and get caught, they would face a $1,000 fine. Additional laws passed in 1807 stated that every free Black person who wanted to move to Ohio had to provide proof that they were a free person and not a "fugitive slave." They also needed two White people to vouch for them, offering to be financially responsible if the Black person acted out or could not financially support themselves. Specifically, a $500 promissory bond needed to be posted, which is nearly $18,000 today. Furthermore, Black residents of Ohio could not defend themselves in a court of law against a White person because they were not allowed to testify.

== Early life ==
Records show that Prior Foster was born in 1799 in Pennsylvania. Although records do not indicate the specific circumstances of his move from Pennsylvania to Ohio, it is known that he moved to Coshocton, Ohio, early in his life. His father, Prior Foster Sr., lived in Stark County, Ohio, for many years until his death in 1840. His father was a freed Black man, and his mother was named Rebecca Breymer, a Dutch woman. Additionally, Foster had three brothers: Robert, Levi, and Joseph. Abolitionism was carried throughout the family, as they were all involved in the social justice activism. Most notably, Joseph Foster worked closely alongside Prior Foster at the Woodstock Manual Labor Institute, and Levi Foster assisted freedom seekers through the Underground Railroad in Canada.

After moving to Coshocton, Foster received an education, a valuable concept to his father, according to his brother's biography. The first Clerk of Courts in Coshocton, Adam Johnston, taught Foster and a White boy named Joseph Burns, at the courthouse, which operated out of a cabin known as "King Charlie's Tavern" from 1811-1819. Adam Johnston was a close relative of some of Coshocton's first White settlers. Foster and Burns were memorable students for Johnston, who later recalled them studying together in his office.

Prior Foster was the owner of a significant amount of land during the early 1800s, which was notable given the restrictions imposed by Black Laws established in Ohio. Foster owned two major land plots in Coshocton, which he won at a public auction, earning widespread recognition. He went on to own an estimated 1,000 acres across neighboring towns, most prominently in Newcastle. Foster devoted some of his land to being a safe haven for runaway slaves.

== Role in the Underground Railroad ==
Historical records show that Prior Foster was a "conductor" for the Underground Railroad. He hid freedom seekers in his double shanty home at Harbaugh Corner in Coshocton as they made their way toward freedom in the northern United States and Canada. He provided them with safe shelter, food, and clothing while hiding them overnight.

One of the dangers that Prior Foster and the freedom seekers he assisted had to be wary of were "slave catchers" and kidnappers who sought to capture them and return them to their enslavers for a bounty or re-sell them in the south—a phenomenon known as the Reverse Underground Railroad. At one point, some Virginian bounty hunters arrived in Coshocton and posted signs offering large sums of money to anyone who returned "runaways." While this was happening, Foster and more than a dozen freedom seekers he was assisting hid at a spot on the Muskingum River known as "Hanging Rock." One Coshocton resident was so offended by the bounty hunters' behavior that he knocked one of them into the mud, which caused them to flee town. Afterward, Foster safely transported the people in his care to the home of Eli Nichols.

Rev. William E. Hunt, one of Coshocton County's early White settlers, wrote about Prior Foster in his book Historical Collections of Coshocton County, Ohio (published in 1876). Hunt gave an account of an incident that occurred in 1839 involving Prior Foster and several freedom seekers. Multiple United States officers were pursuing the freedom seekers with the intention of returning them south, in accordance with the Fugitive Slave Laws of the time. Foster and several people "in sympathy with him" attempted to hide the individuals among some rocks up the Walhonding River. However, the freedom seekers were eventually captured and returned to slavery. This incident likely signaled the end of Foster's tenure as an Underground Railroad conductor.

Records indicate that during this time period Prior Foster also worked for The Philanthropist, an abolitionist newspaper edited by James G. Birney. In 1841, Birney moved to Michigan, a state considered more hospitable to freedom seekers and abolitionists. Prior Foster and his family would soon follow.

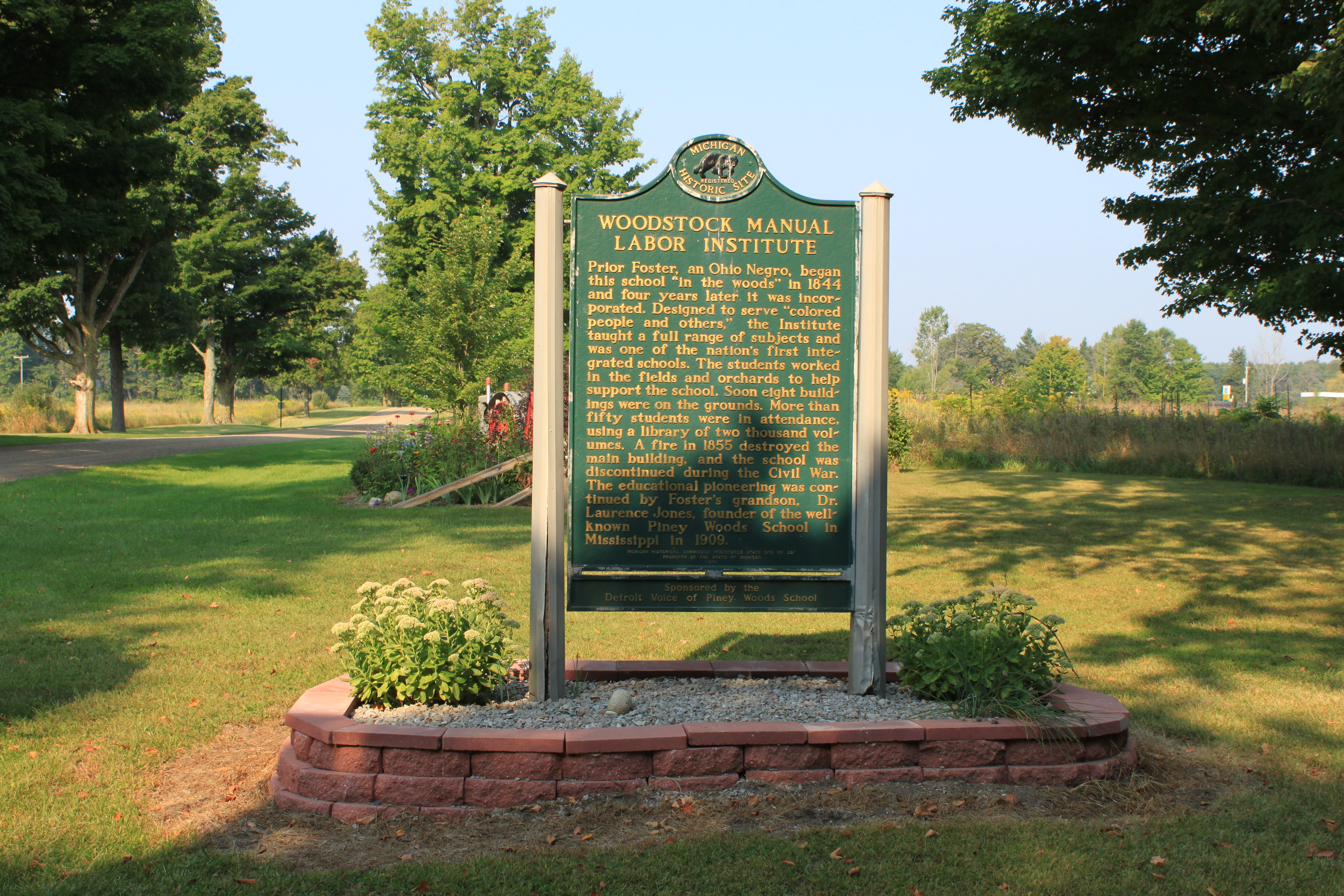
Historical marker presenting information about the Woodstock Manual Labor Institute, started by Foster

== Woodstock Manual Labor Institute ==
In 1842, Prior Foster and his brother attended an abolitionist meeting in Massillon, Ohio, where they were designated representatives of a new initiative to start a school for Black children. The school was to be called the "Grand River Institute," and Foster and his brother were tasked with fundraising and seeking out a good location for it somewhere in the United States.

Foster spent the next several years gathering support for this initiative in the North. However, records show that he had a falling out with the abolitionists in Masillon, who published an announcement in 1943 in The Liberator, saying that Foster had failed to report to the committee and was appropriating funds for his own use.

By 1844, Foster had acquired several hundred acres of land in Lenawee County, Michigan, and established the Woodstock Manual Labor Institute. That year, about 30 students enrolled, many of whom helped construct the school's building in exchange for tuition. Although the school’s primary focus was on providing educational opportunities to Black students, it was open to people of all races, genders, religious affiliations, and backgrounds. In 1845, Foster went before the Michigan Legislature with a petition to incorporate the school. However, legislators rejected his petition, claiming that there weren't enough Black people in Michigan to render his school necessary. Despite this setback, Foster continued with his plans to provide quality education to children of color and to ultimately improve their lives amid the era of enslavement and Black Laws. In 1848, the Legislature reversed its earlier decision and officially incorporated the Woodstock Manual Labor Institute, making it the first manual labor institute for Black students to be chartered by a state legislature.

Foster continued to be dogged by controversy in the school's early years. In addition to facing claims of mismanaging the school's money, he also was accused by Frederick Douglass' newspaper The North Star, of attempting to recruit students to his school by falsely claiming he had their endorsement. In response to these accusations, Foster published a refutation in The Liberator, and 10 signatories testified that they had reviewed the school's finances and found nothing amiss.

By 1850, the Woodstock Manual Labor Institute had about 60 students, a library of 1,400 books, and eight buildings. The school offered classes in subjects, including reading and writing, algebra, chemistry, philosophy, Greek and Latin, and piano. In the following years, many citizens openly praised Foster for the establishment of the school. The school continued to operate until approximately 1860. Experts speculate that a fire that destroyed the boarding house, waning financial support, and the dawn of the American Civil War may have all contributed to its closure.

== Late Life ==
Records indicate that by 1864, Prior and his wife Abigail, along with some of their children, had moved to Morris, Illinois, to be closer to their son George Washington Foster.
