= Underground Railroad in Ohio =

Ohio played a significant role in the Underground Railroad due to its key location on the Kentucky border and the anti-slavery sentiments in the state. Abolitionists serving the Underground Raildroad worked with enslaved people to organize escape routes to the North, and many of these routes intersected and passed through the state of Ohio. Many of the Underground Railroad sites in Ohio are still standing today and provide the public with opportunities to learn about history.

Historians estimate 1,543 to over 2,000 Underground Railroad agents and operators in Ohio helped between 40,000 and 50,000 fugitive slaves escape to ports near Cleveland, and escape through the Great Black Swamp to ports near Toledo and Sandusky to cross Lake Erie and find freedom in Canada. Historians believe more stations existed in the Underground Railroad between the Ohio River and Lake Erie than the official records state because of the massive organization of effort and resources to deliver slaves to freedom. Ohio historian Wilbur Henry Siebert described the Underground Railroad as "the beginning of a renaissance of American morals."

== Background ==
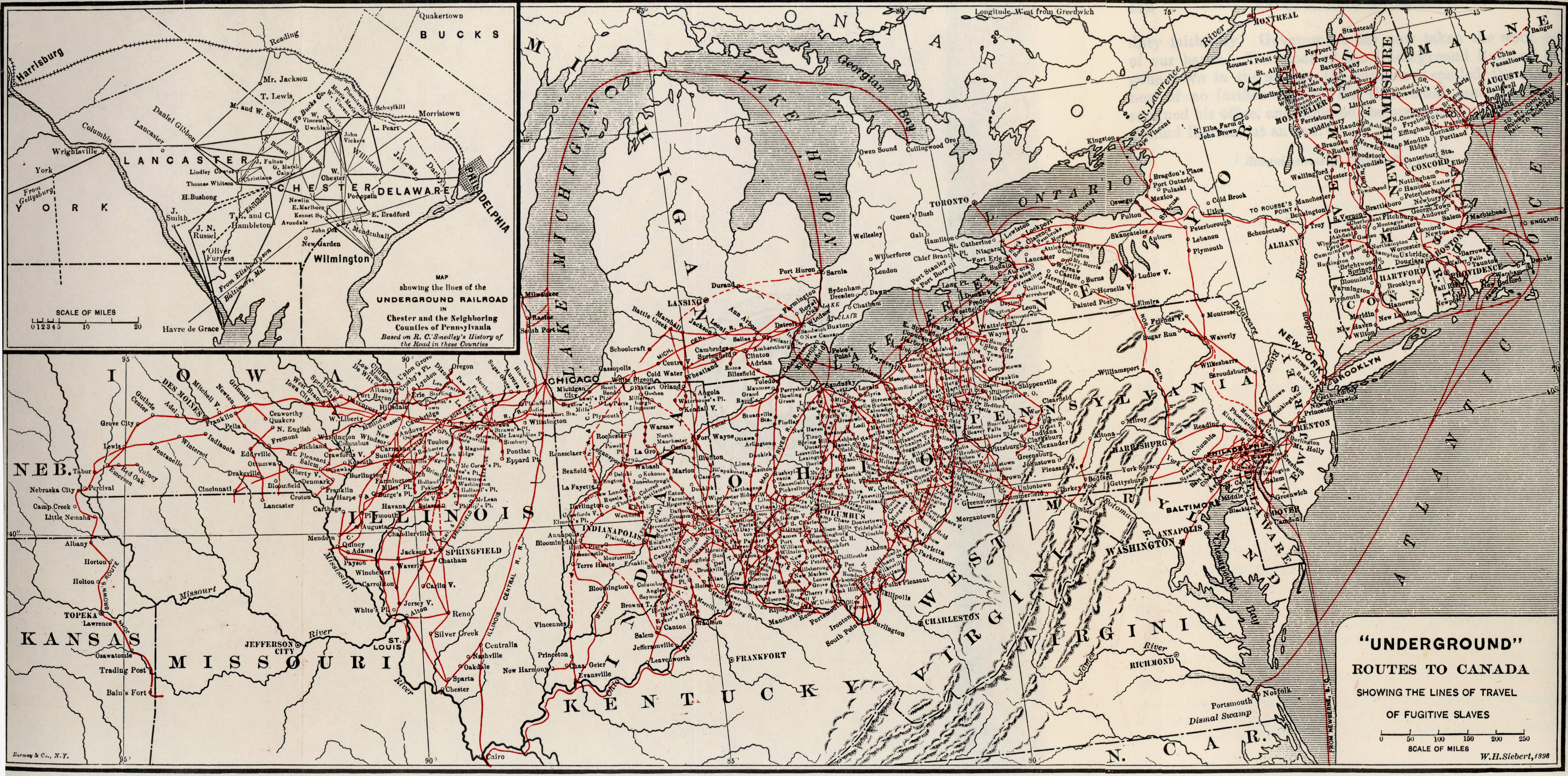
Map of Underground Railroad Routes

When the 1787 Northwest Ordinance outlawed slavery in lands newly acquired by the United States government, including the land which would become the state of Ohio in 1803, a divide formed between slaveholding and free territories. Many enslaved people in the southern United States sought to escape bondage long before the term "Underground Railroad" emerged. Throughout slaveholding states, the support system for freedom seekers was local and informal. In the 1830s, the system known as the Underground Railroad became more organized and widespread. Communication about the Underground Railroad required secret methods, such as coded signals, nighttime travel, and the use of the North Star for navigation to keep escape efforts hidden. Conductors and guides (often free Black people or white abolitionists) used signals such as lamps in windows and provided safe houses and directions to help those escaping reach freedom safely. During the 1840’s many interconnected local networks helped individuals reach freedom rather than one mainstream operation. The Underground Railroad reached its peak during the 1850s before it ended after the abolition of slavery in 1865.

=== Fugitive Slave laws ===
The Federal Fugitive Slave Laws of the U.S. Constitution became a major source of conflict in Ohio and the broader United States in the lead up to the Civil War. The conflicts led to the creation of the Federal Fugitive Slave Acts of 1793 and 1850, which required the capture and return of freedom seekers. These laws intensified the struggle faced by the Underground Railroad, therefore, creating tension in the Northern states as abolitionists faced greater punishment under the law for helping freedom seekers.

=== State laws ===
Although the Northwest Ordinance of 1787 banned slavery in the Northwestern territories, many loopholes existed within the Ordinance, including one stating that “voluntary” indentured servitude was allowed. White settlers who moved to Ohio from slave-holding states like Virginia and Kentucky often brought enslaved people with them and called them indentured servants.

Despite the fact that Ohio's officially ended slavery in 1803, Ohio's Black Laws of 1804 and 1807 made it challenging for the Underground Railroad to operate. In particular, Conductors had to adapt and become more careful as they continued their work. People fleeing slavery still faced significant risks due to the Ohio Fugitive Slave Law of 1823, which accounted for many arrests and kidnappings of fugitives.

== Ohio routes ==
Ohio had around 3,000 miles of routes for escaping slavery that ran through the state. The Ohio River was an important physical boundary on the Underground Railroad, symbolizing the separation of slavery and freedom. Towns such as Ripley, Oberlin, and Salem turned into sanctuaries for those who were seeking freedom.

=== Ohio river and its tributaries ===
Skiff

One major entry route to Ohio involved boating across or down the Ohio River in a skiff, a steamboat, or a borrowed canoe. Escape journeys were often taken at night to ensure secrecy and safety. From the river, there were at least 23 safe points of entry to the state, 13 of them entering from the Kentucky shore. Tributaries of the Ohio River also provided modes of travel for freedom seekers. Although some freedom seekers traveled through the state by river or canal, most were guided by allies on foot through the harsh terrain.

=== Major counties ===
Ohio and Its Counties

Ohio routes zig-zagged across the state, generally approaching the Northwest and often linking with departure points on Lake Erie, such as Cleveland, Toledo, Sandusky, Fairport Harbor, and Ashtabula. The lake provided a major escape route toward Canada once slaves crossed the state of Ohio. Some of the major counties with active stations included Richland, Putnam, Trumbull, Huron, Belmont, Ashtabula, Jefferson, Lorain, and Mahoning. They contributed a significant amount to the Underground Railroad trails. Below are their trail distances:

- Trumbull (Northeast Ohio): 153 miles
- Richland (North Central Ohio): 123 miles
- Huron (North Central Ohio): 120 miles
- Ashtabula and Jefferson (Eastern Ohio): 117 miles
- Lorain (Northeast Ohio): 108 miles
- Mahoning (Northeast Ohio): 105

Additionally, there were also multiple cross-state connections from Indiana to the west and Pennsylvania to the east.

While traveling through the state, people escaping bondage often received help from Quaker settlements, Wesleyan Methodists, or free Presbyterian churches, many of whom held abolitionist beliefs.

In addition to routes, when groups of self-emancipated people came upon unpopulated land in Ohio, it was not uncommon for them to establish small free communities or safe havens. These societies often welcomed escaped runaways.

Due to a lack of records and the intense secrecy of these operations, it is uncertain how many people achieved freedom after traveling through Ohio; however, the number is estimated to be between 40,000 and 80,000 people.

=== Coshocton, Ohio ===
Coshocton, Ohio, was a significant "station" on the Underground Railroad because it was located at the confluence of the Walhonding and Tuscarawas Rivers, which joined to form the Muskingum River approximately 100 miles north of the Ohio River. Prior Foster, a black man who was educated in Coshocton, was the main conductor from this area. From Coshocton, freedom seekers sometimes used the Ohio and Erie Canal to travel to Lake Erie and cross into Canada.

=== Ripley, Ohio ===
The town of Ripley was a key area for runaway slaves. Thousands of slaves used Ripley as a haven due to its prime location downstream from the town of Maysville, Kentucky. Although slavery was deemed illegal as a result of Ohio's state constitution, when the Fugitive Slave Act was passed in 1850, tensions around slavery became increasingly high in the town, causing deep divides among the townspeople.

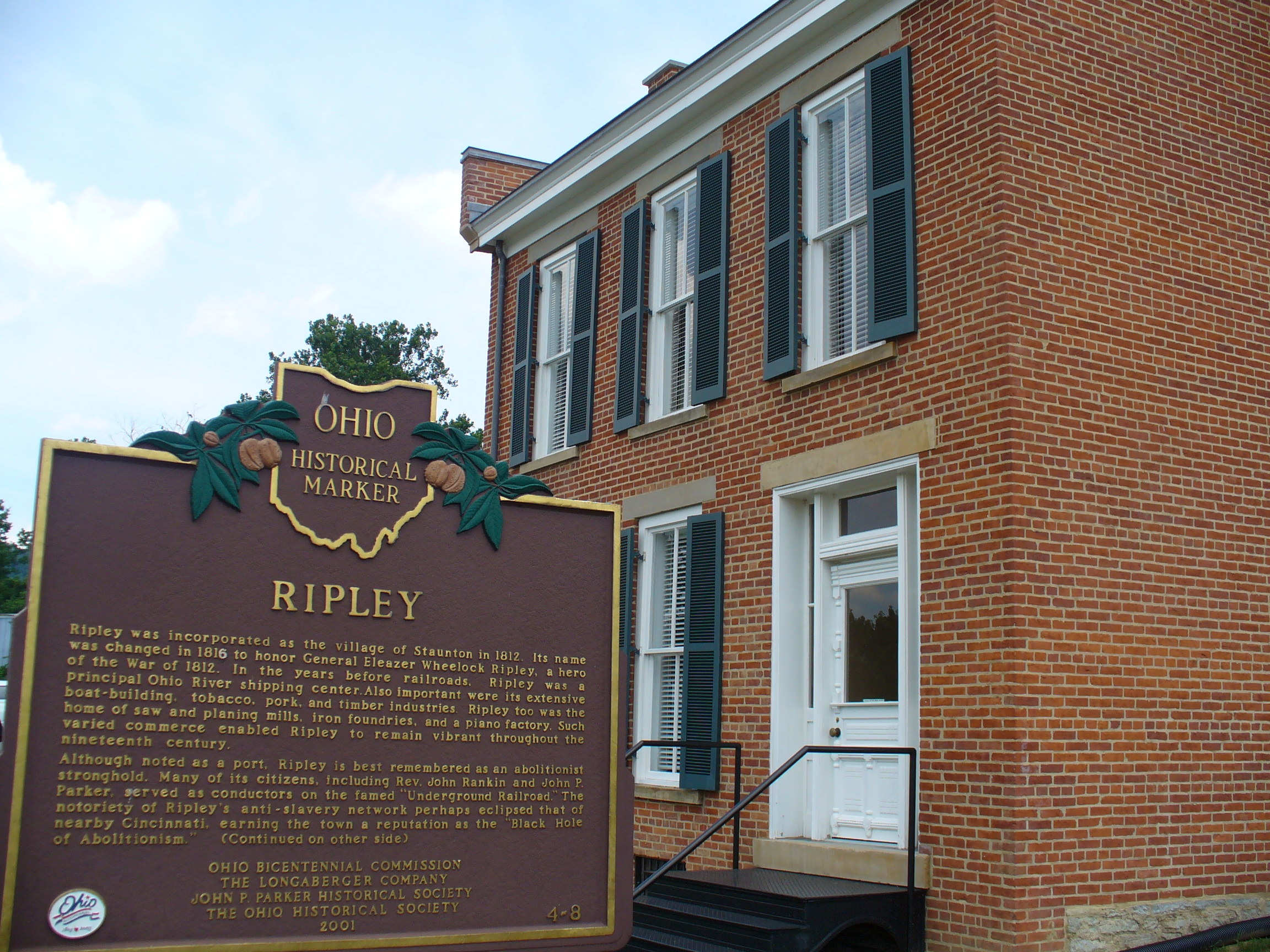
John P. Parker House (Located in Ripley)

In the town of Ripley, John P. Parker played a key role in the Underground Railroad. Before living in Ripley, John P. Parker was enslaved until he earned his freedom through purchase. In 1845, after settling in Ripley, Parker used his knowledge as a skilled laborer working in a foundry casting iron. With his bold actions in the rescuing of runaway slaves, Parker's courage caused him to grow in popularity. Well-known names such as John Rankin and Levi Coffin also assisted Parker in his actions.

=== Gallipolis and Marietta, Ohio ===
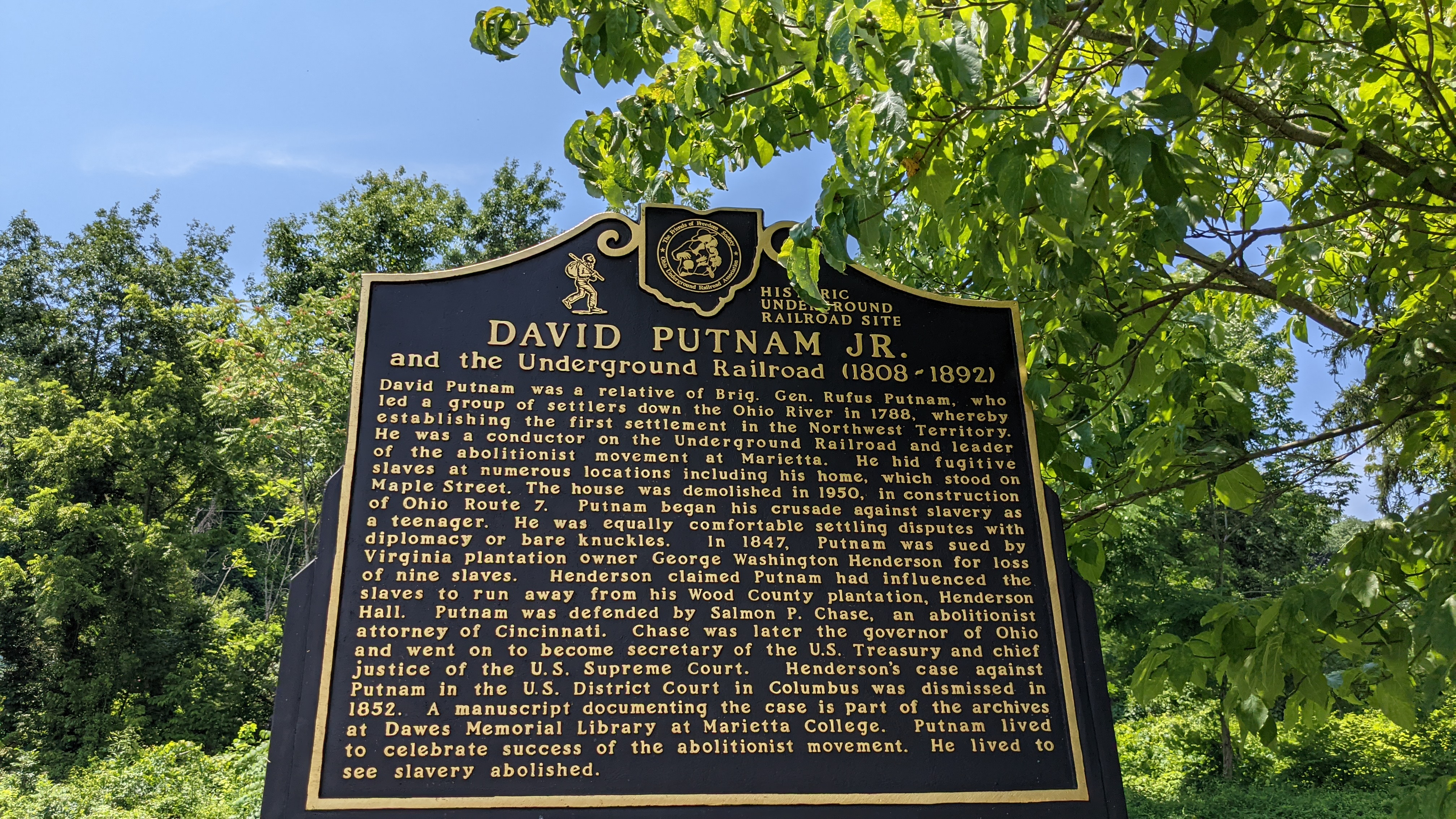
Historical Marker Honoring David Putnam Jr and His Contribution

Freedom seekers were about to cross the Ohio River between Gallipolis and Marietta with the help of David Putnam Jr. Helping runaway slaves often came with great cost. Local "slave catchers" learned what Putnam was doing and set up a trap for him. They surrounded Putnam’s residence while he was helping a runaway slave. People started gathering around the residence when the commotion started, allowing Putnam and the runaway slave to escape.

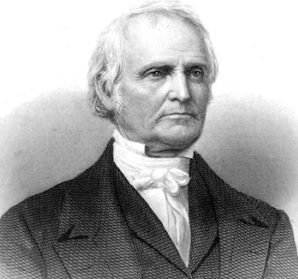
John Rankin (Mechanicsburg Resident and Committed Abolitionist)

=== Mechanicsburg ===
Mechanicsburg became one of the most noted spots on Ohio's Underground Railroad. Three main routes passed through this location, but each conductor and guide knew little about the others' roles to maintain secrecy. In Mechanicsburg, Reverend John Rankin was a conductor on the Ohio River. He would light a lantern in his attic window and try to help runaway slaves cross the river safely. Many other conductors would follow his example, guiding freedom seekers using similar signals.

== Legacy ==
After the abolition of slavery, many Ohio towns worked to preserve historical sites associated with the Underground Railroad. In Cincinnati, the National Underground Railroad Freedom Center, the Harriet Beecher Stowe House, and the Ohio Freedom Path are sites used to commemorate the efforts of abolitionists and conductors. The Freedom Center’s goal is to highlight abolitionists who contributed to the movement during the 19th century. The author of Uncle Tom’s Cabin, Harriet Beecher Stowe, has a house available for public viewing located in Cincinnati's Walnut Hills neighborhood. The Ohio Freedom Pathway starts in Cincinnati and is an audio-guided walking tour that can be accessed through a mobile app.

In Ripley, Ohio, there is the John Parker House and the Underground Railroad walking tour. The Underground Railroad walking tour is a self-guided tour that highlights specific sites connected to the history of the Underground Railroad in Ohio. These landmarks, resources, and houses are preserved so they can educate the next generation of visitors about the efforts of those who were involved in the Underground Railroad.
