= Saint John the Evangelist Church (Columbus, Ohio) =

Church in Columbus, Ohio, US

- Community of Holy Rosary-St. John
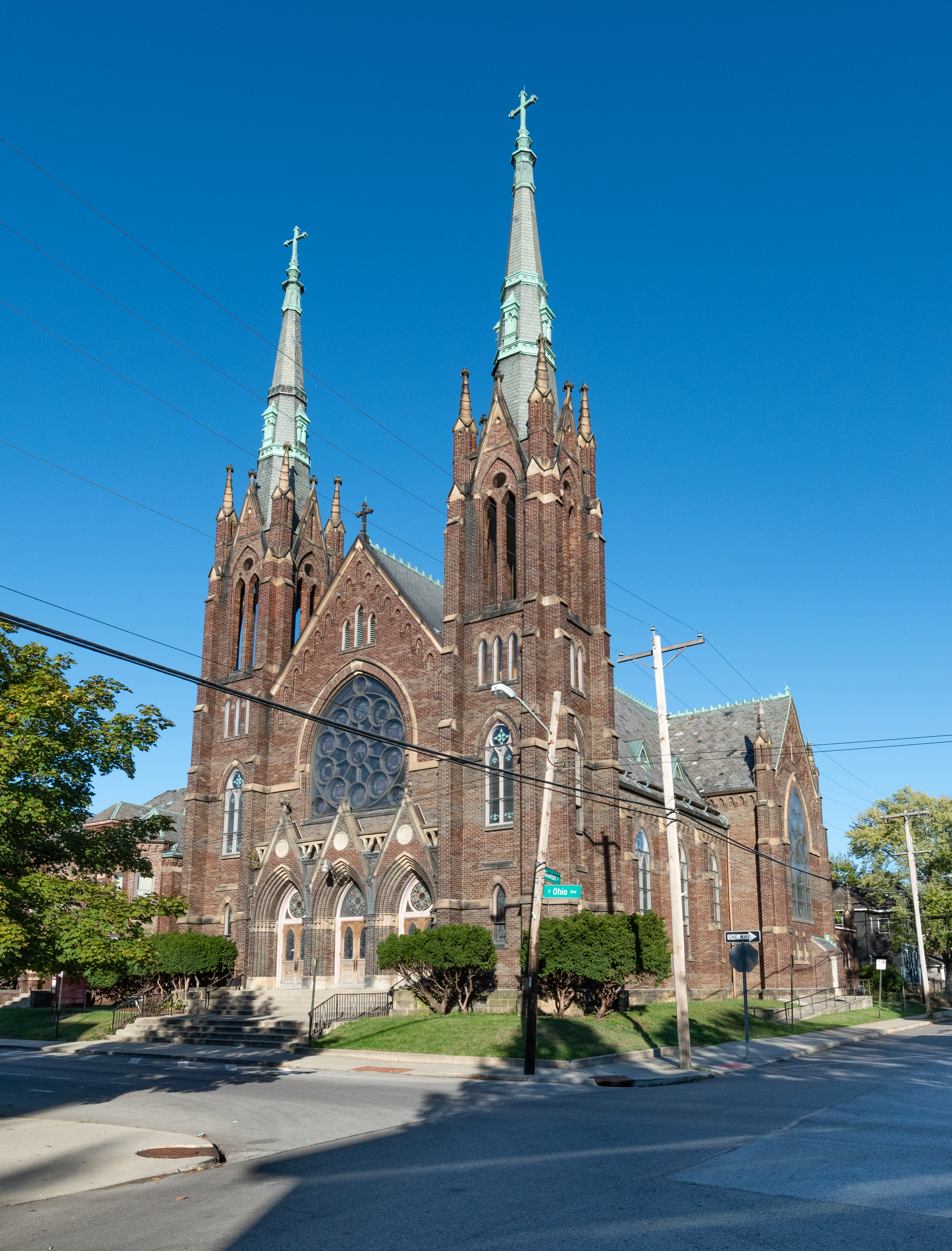
- Saint John the Evangelist Church
- 39°57′6″N 82°58′16″W
- Location: Old Oaks Historic District
- Address: 648 South Ohio Avenue; Columbus, Ohio, US
- Denomination: Catholic
- Religious institute: Society of Jesus (1992–2009)

History
- Founded: 1897
- Consecrated: 24 September 1899

Architecture
- Architect: William P. Ginther
- Style: High Gothic
- Closed: 12 May 2024

Specifications
- Capacity: 800
- Length: 136 ft.
- Width: 54 ft.

Administration
- Diocese: Roman Catholic Diocese of Columbus
- Parish: St. Dominic

Saint John the Evangelist Church was a Catholic church of the Diocese of Columbus located on the Near East side of Columbus, Ohio, United States. The initially German-American congregation was founded in 1897, and the High Gothic church building was completed the following year.

In 1979, neighboring Holy Rosary Church was merged into the parish, forming the Community of Holy Rosary-St. John and within the decade was 70% black. The merged community was again merged into Saint Dominic Church in 2024. While all Masses for the merged parish are hosted at St. Dominic, the St. John campus continues to host a food bank, learning center and a health clinic sponsored by the Sovereign Military Order of Malta. Columbus Landmarks designated the complex as one of its "most endangered" sites the year of its merger and closure.

== History ==
=== Founding ===
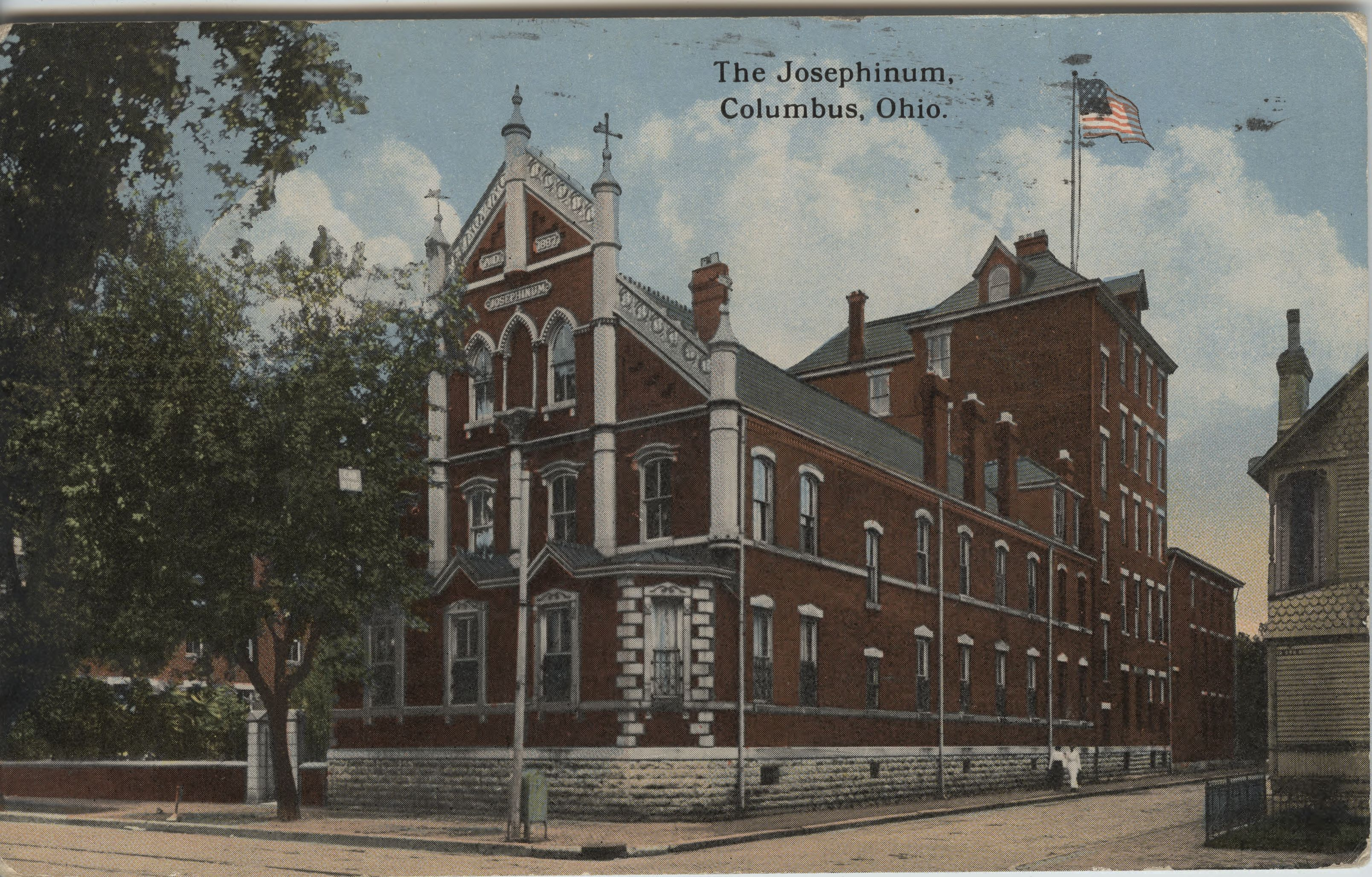
The Josephinum's original campus in downtown Columbus hosted the St. John community for Mass before the construction of the current church.

In November 1897, Simon Weisinger, the first pastor of St. John's, was reassigned from St. Augustine Church in New Straitsville, Ohio, to oversee the founding of a new parish to serve the southeastern portion of the city of Columbus, at the request of bishop John Watterson. Catholics, mainly those of German heritage, had been drawn to the area following the establishment of the Pontifical College Josephinum on East Main Street, which hosted public Mass on Holy days of obligation as well as Sundays. This growth in the lay Catholic population prompted Joseph Jessing to recommend to bishop Watterson that a parish be formed to serve this community.

The first Mass of the parish was said by its founding pastor on January 22, 1898, at St. Turibius Chapel at the Josephinum's campus where services continued to be held until property could be purchased. The following month, six lots of land were purchased on Ohio Avenue, with ground being broken for the foundation in May and the cornerstone being laid by Watterson on July 3, 1898. The rectory on the property was finished on December 6, 1899, and the completed church was dedicated by Fr. Francis Xavier Specht on September 24, 1899, due to the death of Bishop Watterson in April.

=== Church ===
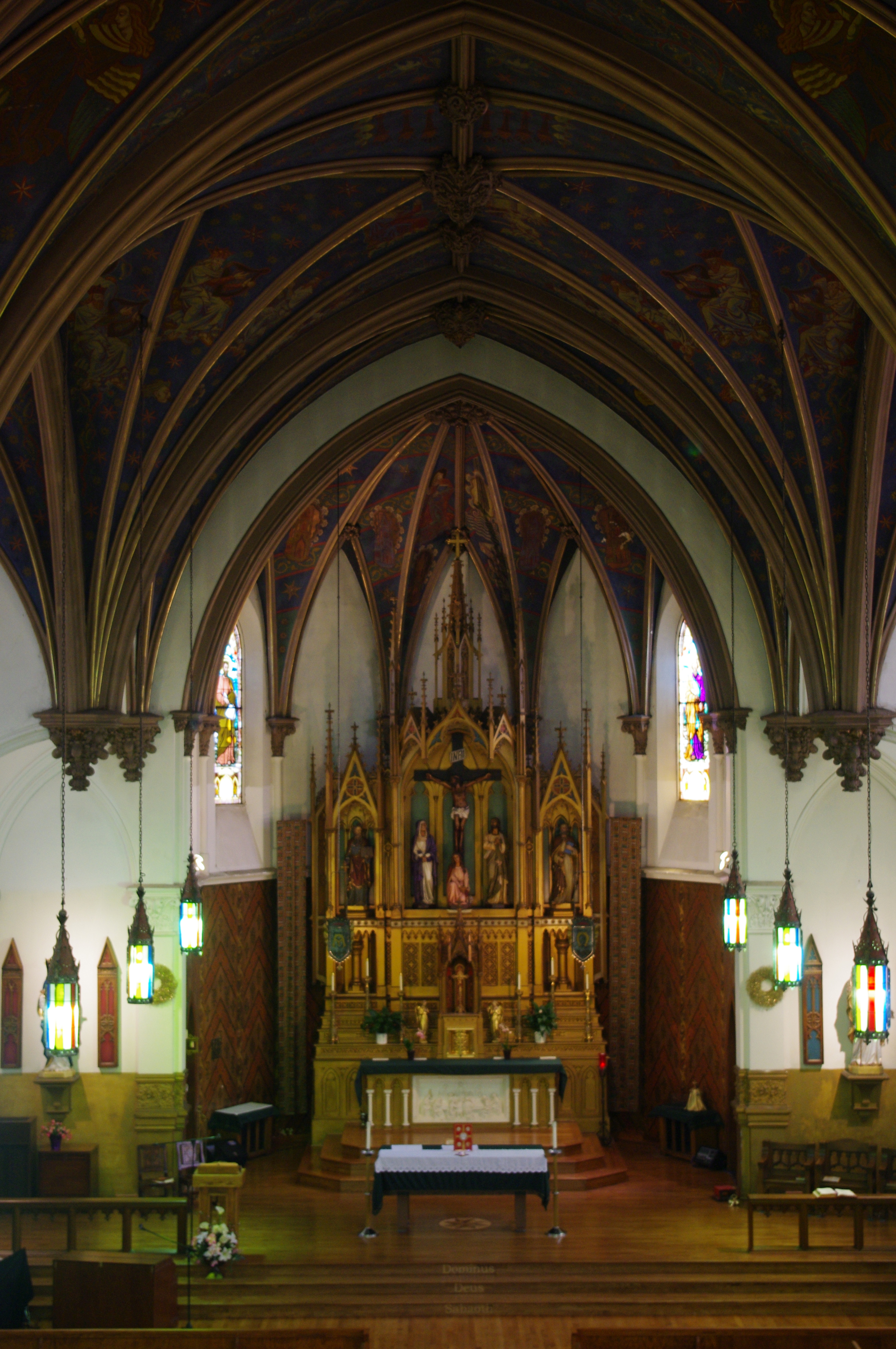
The interior of St. John Church in 2013

The High Gothic church building designed by architect William P. Ginther and completed in 1899 is built of rock-faced vitrified brick. There are stained-glass windows of the Four Evangelists in the sanctuary, along with a depiction of the Adoration of the Magi in honor of Bishop Sylvester Rosecrans in one transept and on the facing side the Ascension of Jesus in honor of Bishop Watterson. The reredos of the main altar is 32 feet high, the spires of the church 132 feet high, and the original seating capacity of the church is 800. The organ for the church was installed by December 1899, and required the enlargening of the choir loft to be made to fit in the space. The church building, rectory, and land cost $51,000.

In 1903, bishop Henry Moeller defined the territorial boundaries of the parish of St. John the Evangelist as composed of most of the eastern side of the city of Columbus, roughly bordered by Truro Township to the north, Madison Township to the south, St. Leo Church to the west, and the Franklin County line to the east.

=== School ===
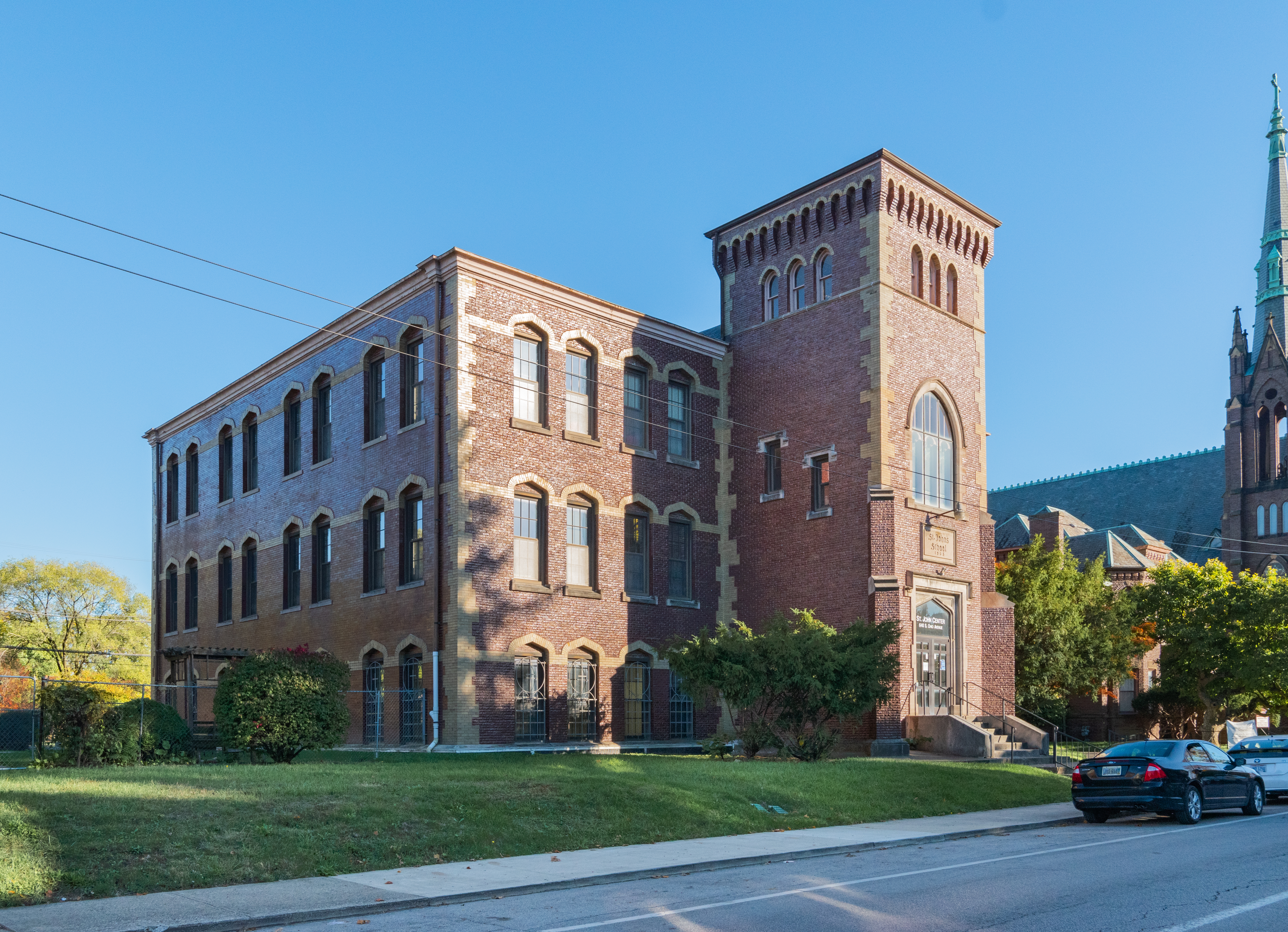
The St. John school building, now home to the St. John Community Center

The congregation began to organize a parochial school in 1905 and the schoolhouse, with eight classrooms and an auditorium with a seating capacity for 800, was dedicated by Bishop James Hartley on August 26, 1906. The building, constructed of the same brick as the church and rectory, was built on a vacant lot directly north of the church building, and was designed by Columbus architect David Riebel.

150 pupils were enrolled in its first year of operation and by 1918 that number had grown to 400. Students from the primary school usually went on to Holy Rosary High School. The teachers were Sisters of St. Francis of Penance and Christian Charity, housed in a convent on the property which was completed in August 1908. The school hall hosted a lecture on Catholicism and socialism given by James Boyle, former American consul to Liverpool, in February 1911. The construction debts of the parish were paid off by September 1922. In July of that same year, Corpus Christi Church was formed from the territory of St. John south of Columbus Street.

The parish also operated a ninth grade beginning in 1935, also taught by the Sisters of St. Francis, which had an enrollment of about 30 for its decade of operation. This number began to decline due to World War II and closed in 1945 or 1946. A parish center with eight bowling lanes, social hall, gymnasium, and meeting spaces located across the street from the church was blessed by Bishop Clarence Issenmann on January 10, 1960. He also bowled the first frame of the alley.

=== Decline and merger with Holy Rosary ===
In the early 1960s, St. John had over 2,000 parishioners. This number declined to less than 300 by 1972, and school enrollment similarly declined. As a result, St. John School merged with the schools of the nearby parishes of Saint Dominic and Holy Rosary, forming a joint school called John XXIII School, which served a primarily African-American and Protestant student body. St. John's school building hosted grades 1–3. John XXIII School closed in 1983 due to budget deficits.

Following the departure of the Franciscan sisters who formerly inhabited the convent on the church grounds in 1971, the Blackman's Development Center, a militant Black power group under the leadership of Hassan Jeru-Ahmed, opened a drug rehabilitation facility there, prompting controversy. This was particularly due to its proximity to the still-active school building. The convent went on to house staff members of the BDC. Major renovations were undertaken to the church in 1973, with two-thirds of the pews being removed from the building to create a flexible worship area, the walls being painted white, and a confessional being removed to make space for a handicapped ramp. Removed items, including statues, pieces of altar rail, and side altars, were auctioned off in the church yard.

In May 1979, neighboring Holy Rosary church was merged into St. John, forming the Community of Holy Rosary-St. John, which worshipped exclusively at the St. John campus, as Holy Rosary's church building was sold to a Baptist congregation shortly following its merger. Holy Rosary's membership had significantly declined following the construction of Interstate 70, and White flight lead to neighborhoods being inhabited by mostly non-Catholic African-Americans. These issues also affected St. John.

=== Outreach ===
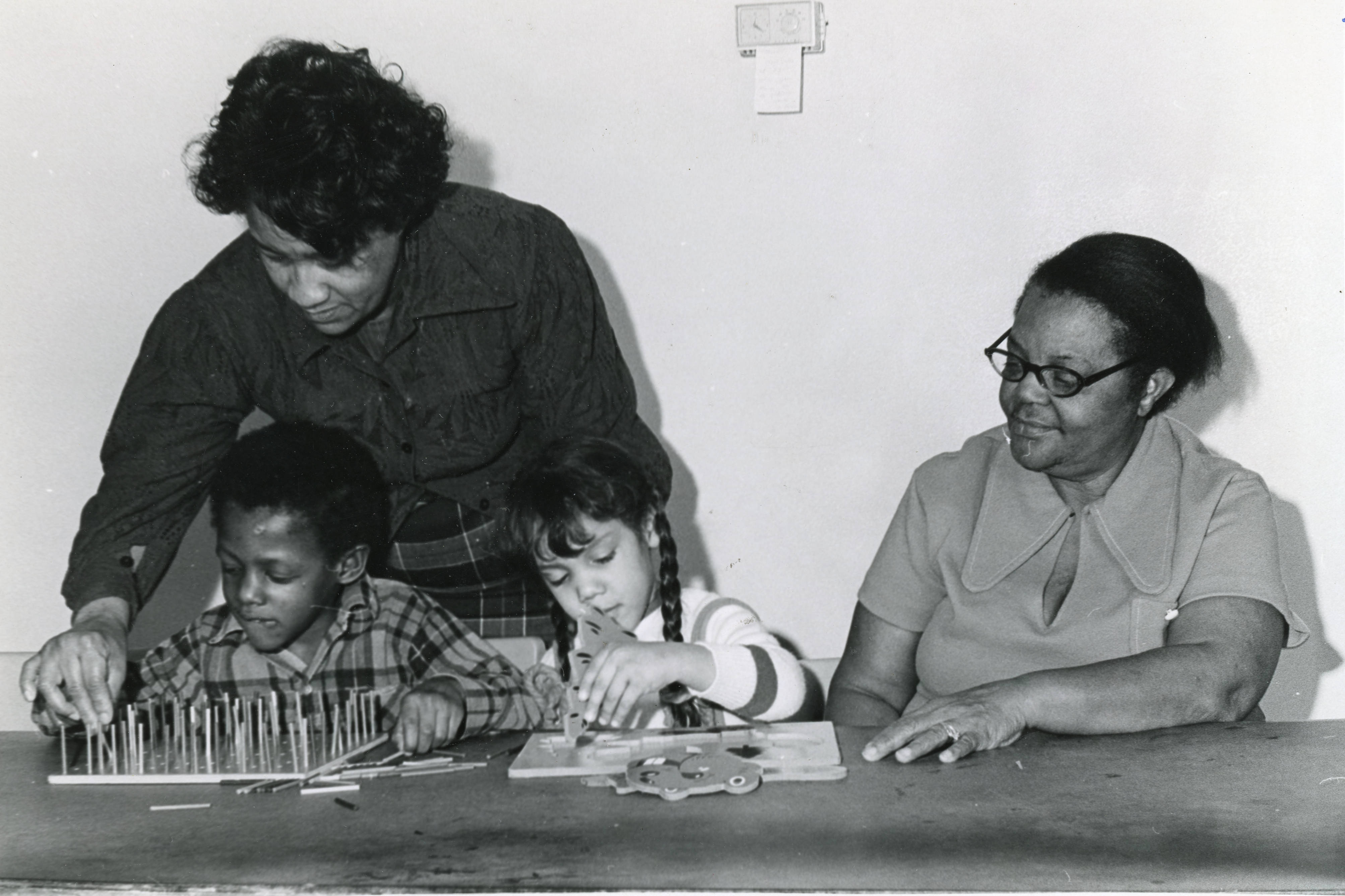
Children and parents at the Head Start program hosted at St. John

In the mid-1980s, St. John began to introduce Gospel music in services to make black congregants feel more welcome, and attendance grew from 75 to 200 over the course of a year. Ohio State University's Division of Black Studies operated continuing education courses from the parish hall in the mid-1970s. The parish hosted commemorative Masses for Martin Luther King Jr. Day, and George Stallings Jr. spoke at a parish revival in 1986. By the end of the decade, the congregation was approximately 70% black.

In 1971 the parish founded the St. John Community Center, which organized food drives. The program was serving free hot lunches to 200 people per weeekday in 1985, serving primarily people from the Near East Side of Columbus out of the old St. John school building.In 1990, priests of the Jesuits took over staffing the parish due to the order's familiarity with urban parochial work. Responsibility for the parish was returned to the Diocese of Columbus in 2009.

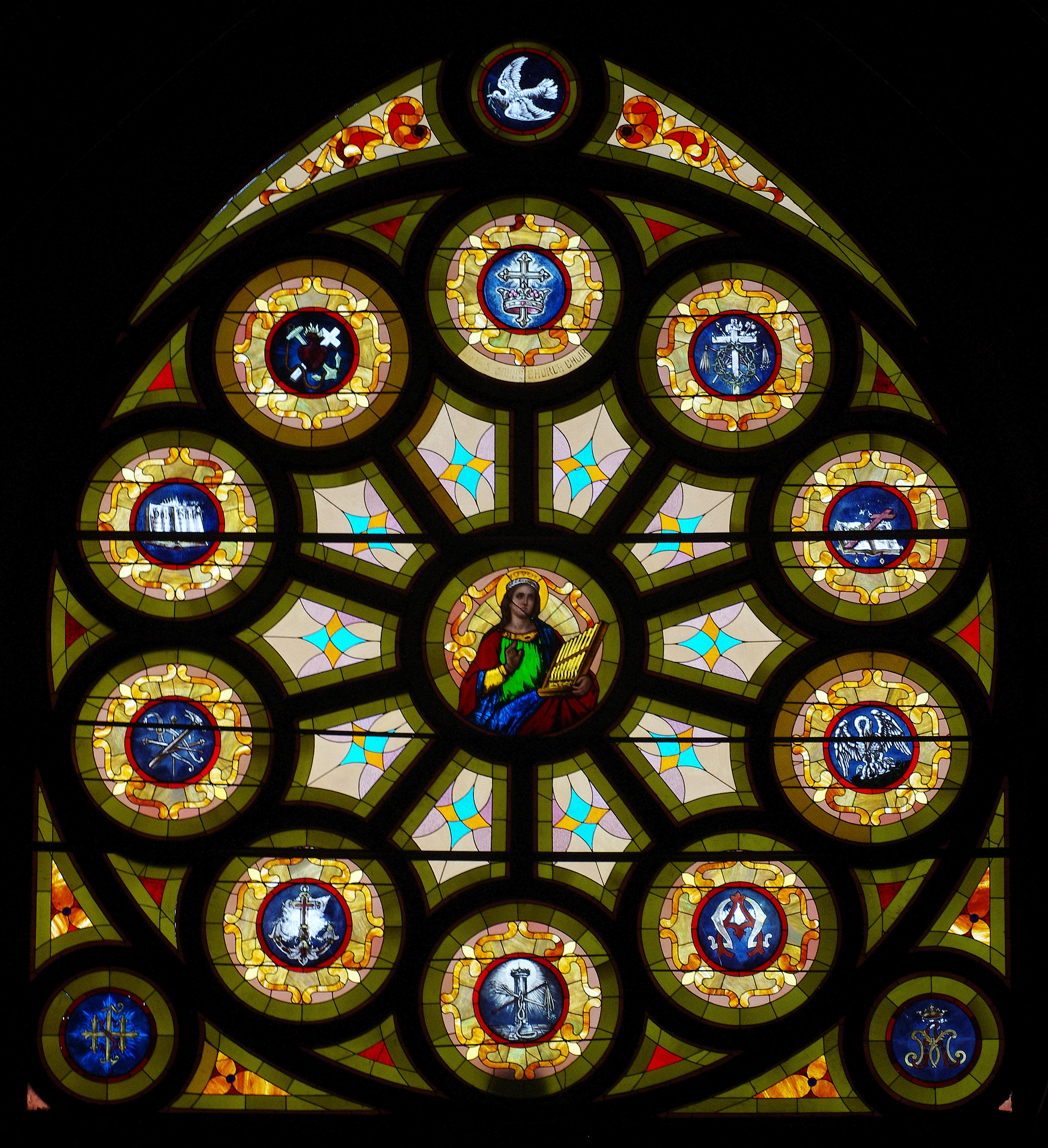
The St. Cecilia stained-glass window which sustained damage in 2011

Damage from a piece of the rose window at the rear of the church falling into the choir loft in 2011 required $67,000 in repairs, which was paid for by an anonymous donor. $35,000 was also given for new lighting for the interior of the church building.

=== Closure and merger into St. Dominic ===
As part of a wider campaign of church mergers and closures in the Columbus diocese, Holy Rosary-St. John was merged into St. Dominic Church, another predominantly African-American church on the East Side of Columbus, by Earl K. Fernandes on January 17, 2024. The Columbus Diocese stated that this was in part due to low Mass attendance and deteriorating facilities which necessitated millions of dollars of repairs. While the St. John church building is no longer the site of Masses, the St. John Community Center continues to operate out of the school building, hosting a food bank, GED classes, and a medical clinic sponsored by the Sovereign Military Order of Malta. The building was deconsecrated on January 21, 2026.
