= Woodland Park (Columbus, Ohio) =

- Neighborhood of Columbus
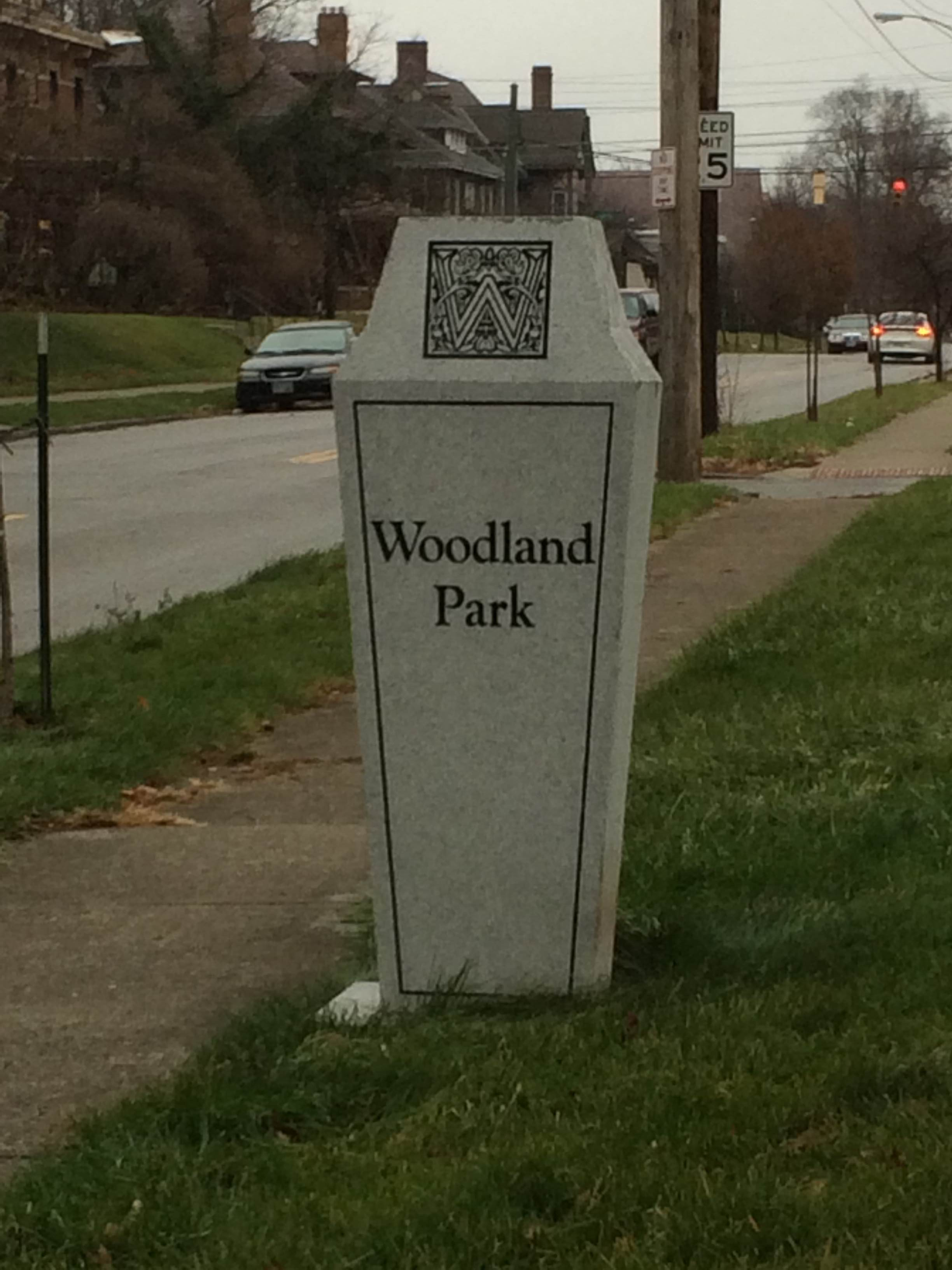
- Neighborhood Marker for Woodland Park
- Interactive map of the neighborhood
- Coordinates: 39°58′08″N 82°57′30″W
- Country: United States
- State: Ohio
- County: Franklin
- City: Columbus
- ZIP Code: 43203, 43219
- Area code: 614

Woodland Park is a residential neighborhood located in the Near East Side of Columbus, Ohio that houses approximately 1,500 residents. The neighborhood was previously home to such figures as artist Emerson Burkhart, cartoonist Billy Ireland, and judge William Brooks. Established in the early 20th century, Woodland Park has grown from its planned neighborhood roots into a neighborhood that contains various faith communities, schools, sources of entertainment and recreation, and borders an extension of the Ohio State University medical center.

== History ==
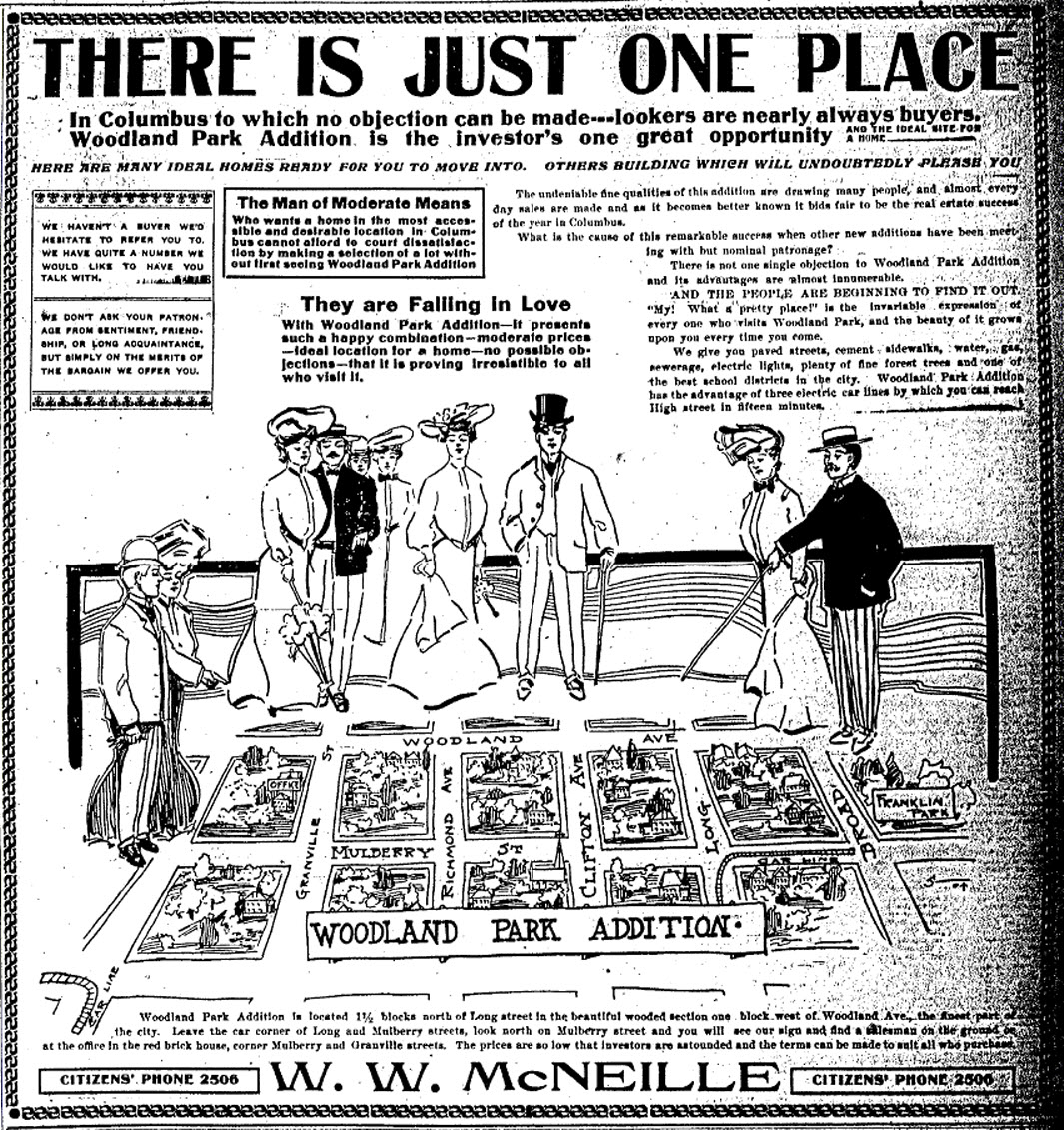
The original advertisement for Woodland Park

Woodland Park, one of Columbus’ first planned neighborhoods, is named for Woodland Avenue and the Woodland Park Addition. Woodland Park Addition is a subdivision that can be identified as early as 1899. The first homes in the area were built in the mid-1890s. At the center of Woodland Park Addition is Hawthorne Park bounded by Hawthorne Park Road. Development of Woodland Park Addition was limited and located primarily along Long Street and Woodland Ave. An advertisement in the Columbus Dispatch on June 26, 1904 boasted the amenities offered in the neighborhood; "We give you paved streets, cement sidewalks, water, gas, sewerage, electric lights, plenty of fine forest trees and one of the best school districts in the city. Woodland Park Addition has the advantage of three electric car lines by which you can reach High Street in fifteen minutes."

Throughout the 20th century, owners motivated by racism put restrictions in deeds preventing those of African descent from purchasing homes. However, these restrictions eventually became irrelevant, as wealthy African American professionals and musicians could pay the sellers overwhelming amounts of money for said homes. Wexner Heritage Village can cite its beginnings back to Woodland Park. In an interview conducted by the Columbus Jewish Historical Society, Annette Tanenbaum notes that the Heritage House was located on Woodland Avenue near Long Street. She adds that it was the first facility in Columbus dedicated to taking care of elderly Jewish people. Heritage House was built in 1951. Today the Wexner Heritage Village continues to provide elderly care to people in the Jewish community.

== Geography ==
Woodland Park is located within the Near East Side of Columbus, Ohio. It is a centrally located neighborhood and two miles away from Downtown Columbus. It is also under the jurisdiction of the Near East Side Area Commission.

The boundaries of the Woodland Park Addition are Clifton Avenue to the north, Long Street to the south, Woodland Avenue to the east and Parkwood Avenue (formerly Mulberry Street) to the west. Over time, recognized boundaries of the neighborhood expanded, and the modern boundaries are I-670 or Maryland Avenue to the North, Broad Street to the south, the Norfolk and Western Railroad to the east, and Taylor Avenue to the west.

Woodland Park is adjacent to the neighborhoods of Shepard to the north, Franklin Park to the south, Eastgate to the east, and King-Lincoln Bronzeville and Mount Vernon to the west. Portions of Woodland Park also overlap with Eastwood Heights.

== Landmarks ==
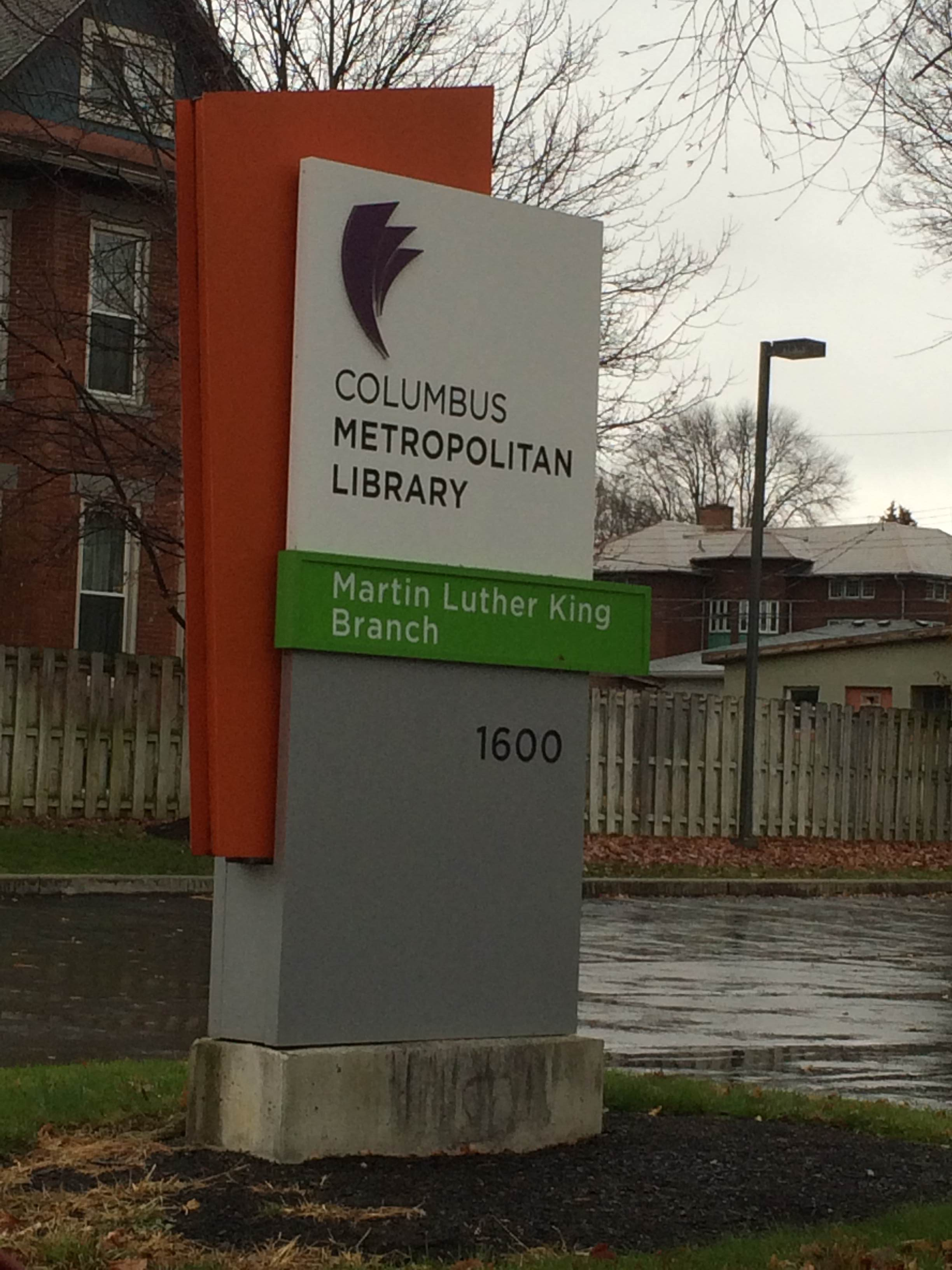
The Martin Luther King Branch of the Columbus library on E. Long Street

Woodland Park includes a stretch of Broad Street that is included in the East Broad Street Historic District. East Broad Street contains multiple structures that were constructed in the early 1900s, with 88% being residential in nature. These structures represent the height of Broad Street's development.

Other landmarks include the following:

- East High School
- The Mansion Day School
- Park Towers
- Emerson Burkhart Home
- Franklin Park Conservatory
- Martin Luther King Branch of the Columbus Metropolitan Library
- Eldon and Elsie Ward YMCA

== Transportation ==
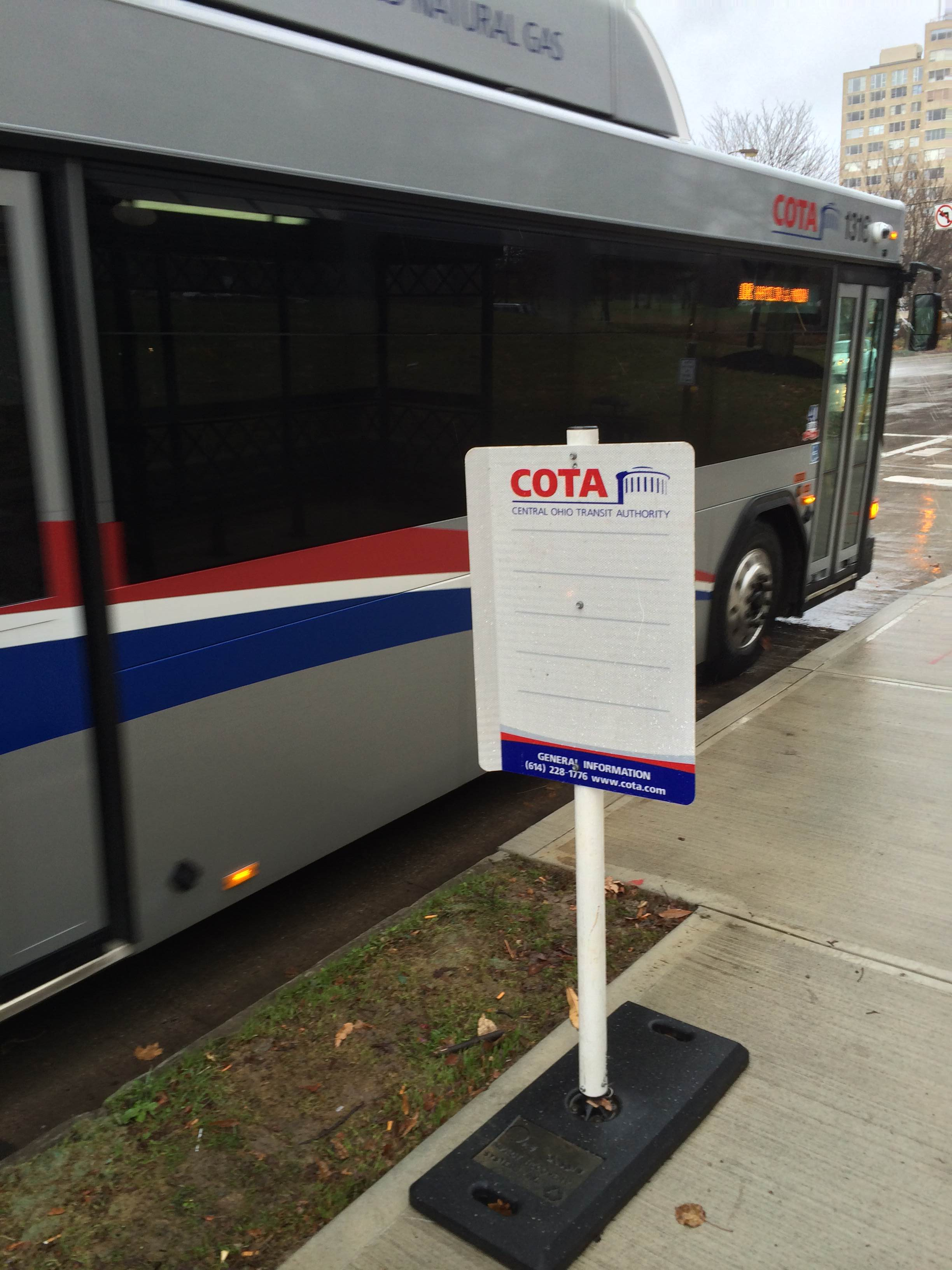
COTA is one of many ways to get through the city of Columbus.

Woodland Park's southern boundary, Broad Street, is notable because of its history as the National Road. Woodland Park’s eastern boundary, the Norfolk and Southern Railroad, is notable as well. Originally constructed as the Scioto Valley Railroad, and later operated as the Ohio Subdivision of the Norfolk and Southern Railroad. The railroad terminated about a mile and a half, or less, north of Fifth Avenue in the modern day Americrest neighborhood.

The neighborhood once had a streetcar line that connected it with downtown. The streetcar went east-to-west along Long Street, and turned north-to-south to connect Long to Broad Street, and to the north side of Franklin Park. The Streetcar began service prior to 1905 and ceased operations shortly after 1940. Additionally, there are 10 Central Ohio Transit Authority, or COTA, bus stops in the neighborhood with access to the No. 6, the "Sullivant" route, and No. 10, the "East Broad Street” route. Other COTA routes include the No. 16 and No. 81 routes.

== Residential ==
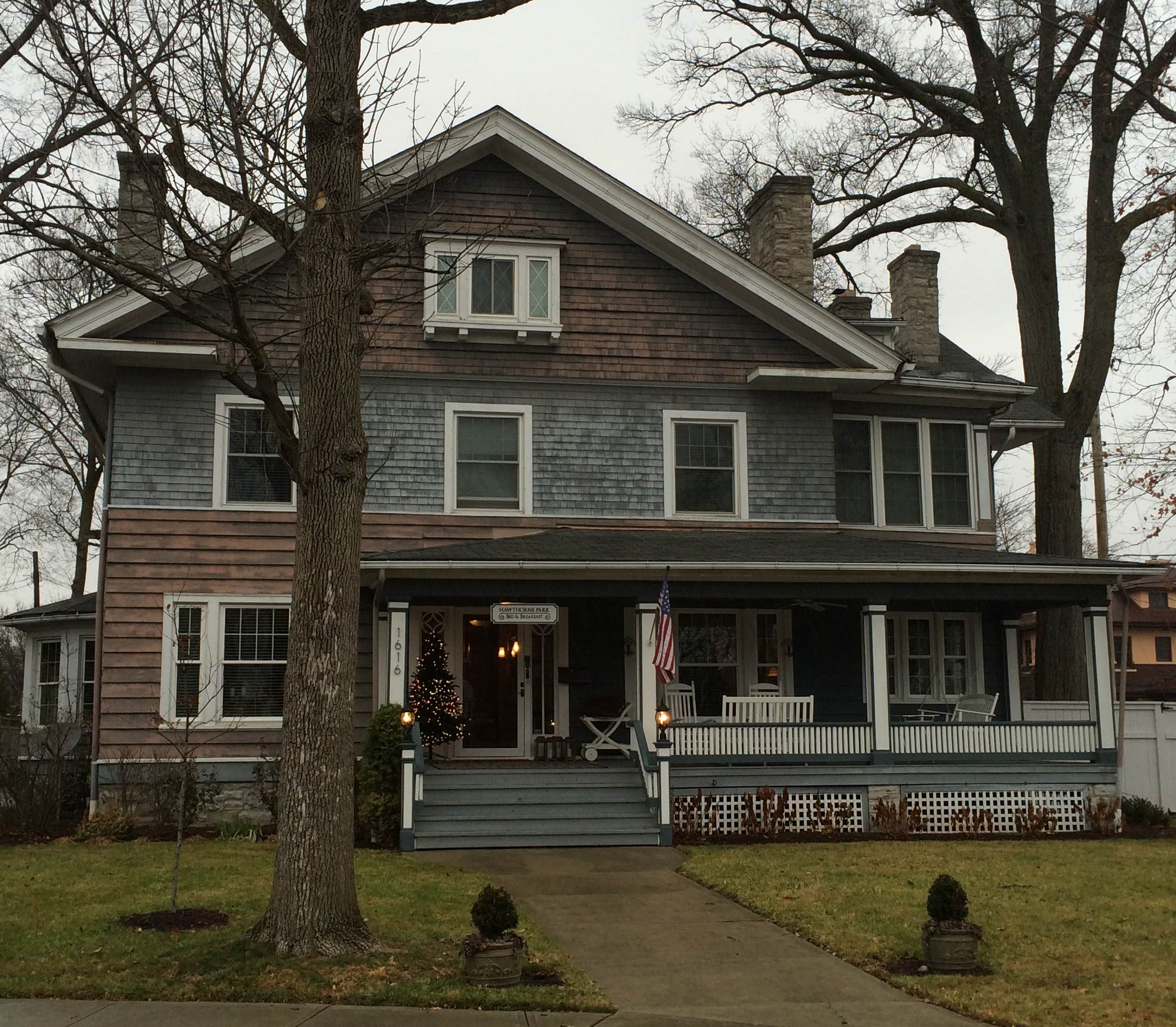
A bed and breakfast in Woodland Park

=== Demographics ===
Demographically, the primary residents of Woodland Park are African Americans with the second most residents classifying themselves as White. Median household income in Woodland Park is slightly below the median income of Columbus, measuring at $24,568 in 2011. Accordingly, median rent in the neighborhood measured at $456 per month in 2011 also. The median age of men and women in Woodland Park is 35, with an average of 2.1 people per household.

=== Architecture ===
The residential area of Woodland Park can be described as a variety of houses with different architecture styles. It is made up of large homes and mansions, town-homes, bungalows, and apartments. Architecture styles of Woodland Park homes range from Queen Anne, Tudor, Greek Revival, Cape Cod, Colonial Revival and Dutch Colonial styles. Woodland Park is home to a Lustron Home that was built in 1950 at 1818 East Long Street. The home is a Westchester Deluxe model. The Lustron Corporation of Columbus built these prefabricated homes after World War II to meet housing shortages.

==== Park Towers ====
Park Towers is a collection of condominiums found at 1620 East Broad Street in the Woodland Park neighborhood. The structure was built in the early 1960s. Park Towers includes office suites on the first floor and 141 private residences available for purchase on the remaining floors. Common areas of the Park Towers building include a lobby, exercise facility, and community garden for residents.

==== Emerson Burkhart home ====
Artist Emerson Burkhart moved to Woodland Park in the mid 20th century and resided at 223 Woodland Avenue until his death in 1969. Annually Burkhart opened his Woodland Avenue home to the public for an open house art show. Thousands of people visited the 22 room home to view the artist's pieces and his home.

=== Religion ===
The largely residential neighborhood boasts several churches, including the Saint Phillip Lutheran Church, Ashbury United Methodist Church, United House of Prayer, and the Jerusalem Tabernacle Baptist Church.

The St. Philip Episcopal Church held its first service in 1891 on the corner of Cleveland Avenue and Naughten Street in downtown Columbus, Ohio. In 1962 the church was relocated to Woodland Park at 166 Woodland Ave. The church continues to congregate in Woodland Park.

In addition to serving its community in a religious role, Woodland Christian Church serves the community in a political role. The church's website claims that it values justice and provides residents such resources as the opportunity to register to vote, election information, and encourages political organization through its Political Action Team.

== Education ==
=== Mansion Day School ===
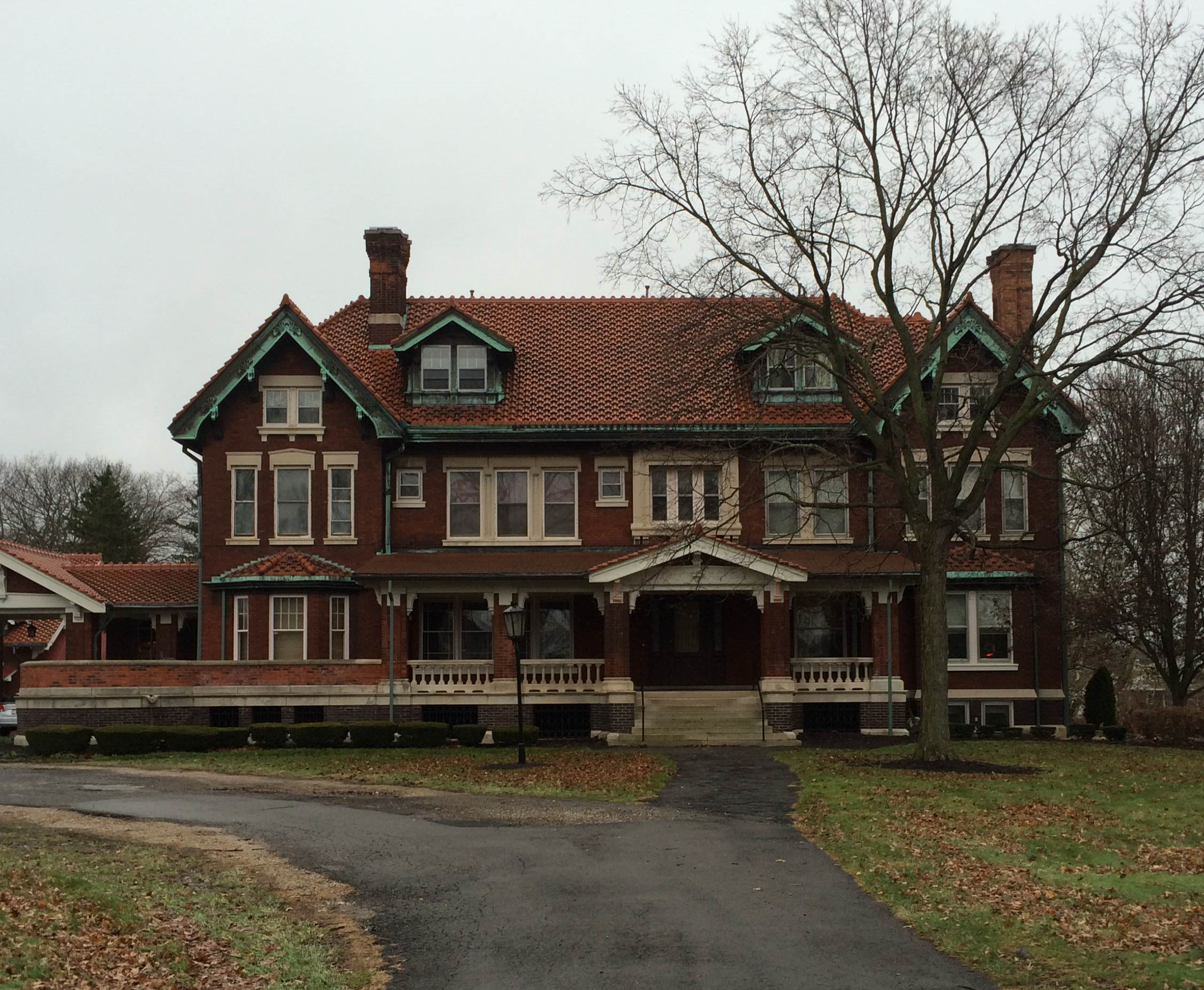
The Mansion Day School

What is today known as the Mansion Day School was originally a mansion built for William A. Miller in 1904, designed by David Riebel. The structure, known as Miller's statement house, has 24 rooms with 15 fireplaces and includes Italian tile and mahogany. William A. Miller was the president of the H.C. Godman shoe company, which had four factories in Columbus, Ohio and four factories in Lancaster, Ohio. The company had up to 3,000 employees at the time of Miller's death in 1921. His wife Anna was a philanthropist and opened the third floor of their home to homeless children. In 1934 the structure was purchased by the Glenmont Home for Christian Scientists and was turned into a nursing home.

The structure has operated for two decades as the Mansion Day School. The elementary school is headed by executive director Dee James and serves students from across greater the greater Columbus area, including the cities of Gahanna, Pickerington, and Dublin. The school is unique because it has a competitive application for admittance.

=== East High School ===
Woodland Park is also home to East High School, a historic public school located at 1500 East Broad Street that is part of Columbus City Schools. Architects Howell and Thomas designed the original school which was built in 1922. East High School was one of five high schools built in accordance with the Smith-Hughes Act whose purpose was to provide federal funding to communities and expand educational opportunities. The school is notable for its connection to the African American population of Columbus and the various famous students that graduated from there, including actor Philip Michael Thomas and athlete and actor Bernie Casey. East High School prides itself in offering a college preparatory curriculum and claims that over $3.5 million worth of scholarships were awarded to the graduating class of 2013. Various clubs offered by East High School include a Science, Technology, Engineering, and Mathematics Club, National Honor Society, a poetry slam, and marching band and drill team.

== Entertainment and recreation ==
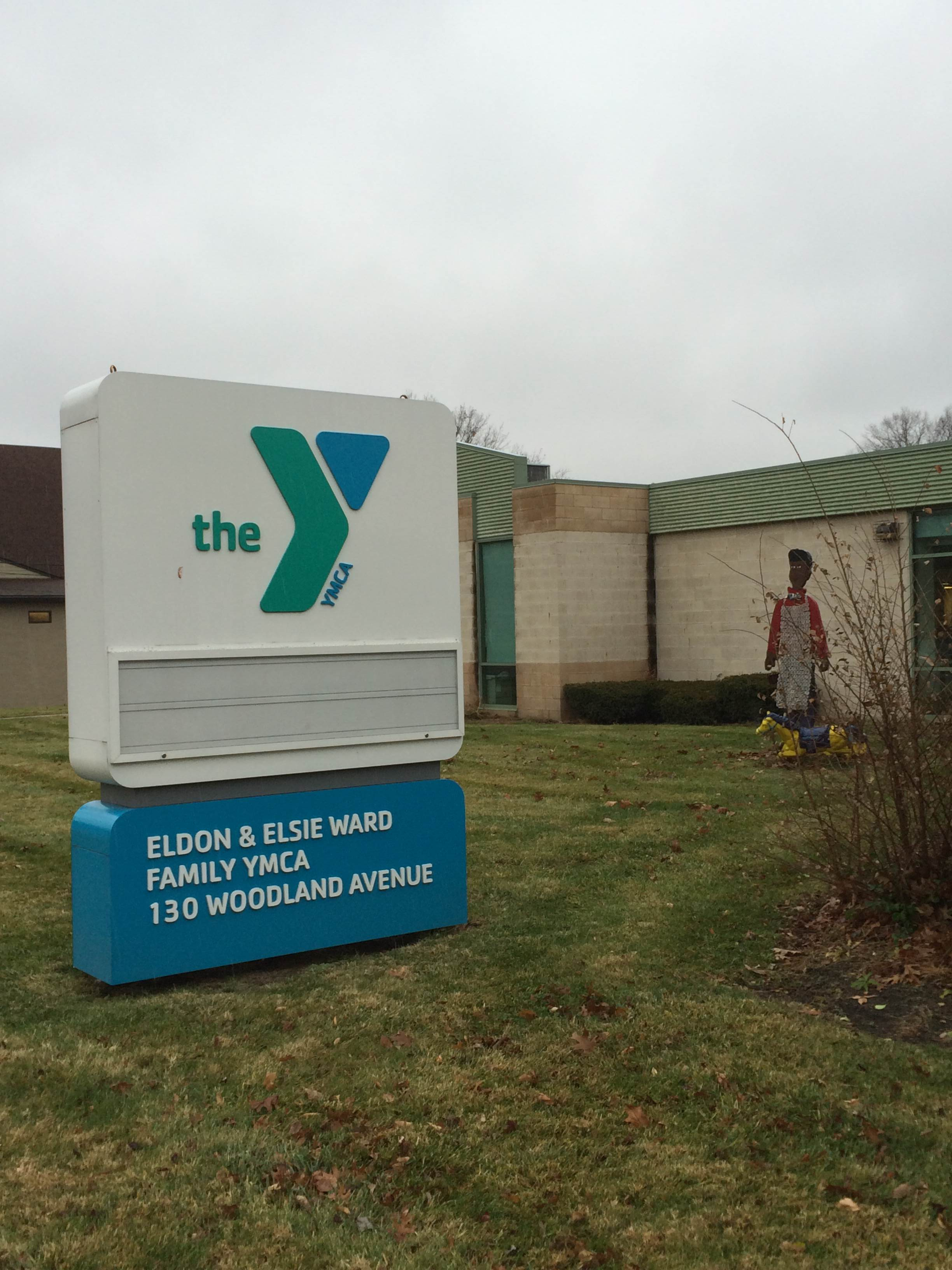
The Eldon and Elsie Ward YMCA is located on Woodland Ave.

=== Franklin Park Conservatory ===
The Franklin Park Conservatory is located just south of Woodland Park, on the south side of Broad Street. The greenhouse, now known as the Palm House, was inspired by the architecture of the Chicago World's Fair and Columbian Exposition and the City Beautiful movement. Franklin Park Conservatory opened to the public in 1895 and in addition to the greenhouse provided the public with carriage paths, a lake, and a boathouse. The park was run by the Columbus Recreation and Parks Department until 1989 when ownership was transferred to a 10 member board of trustees and executive director

=== Columbus Metropolitan Library ===
Woodland Park is also home to a branch of the Columbus Metropolitan Library. The "Martin Luther King" branch located on E. Long Street offers programming such as a TedX club, where teenagers can work with students from the Ohio State University to come up with inspirational speeches based on their own life experiences. Other programs include reading workshops to help children develop reading comprehension skills outside of the regular classroom. Daily programs include homework help for children in school and job searching advice for older individuals.

=== Eldon and Elsie Ward YMCA ===
Originally known as the Spring Street YMCA, The Eldon and Elsie Ward YMCA was founded in 1919. It was one of the first YMCAs in the United States that was principally designated to serve a black community. In 1962, the YMCA moved to the Woodland Avenue location where it presently sits and was renamed the East Side YMCA. In 1997 it again underwent a name change and was named the Eldon and Elsie Ward YMCA to honor their lifelong support of the Columbus community. Eldon Ward was most well known as the head of the E.E. Ward Moving and Transit Company, but he was also a Sunday school teacher and leader in the community. Today, the YMCA named after the late couple offers community members recreational classes as well as facilities such as a gymnasium and a pool. The YMCA of Central Ohio cites part of its key tenants as "youth development, healthy living, and social responsibility".

== Gallery ==
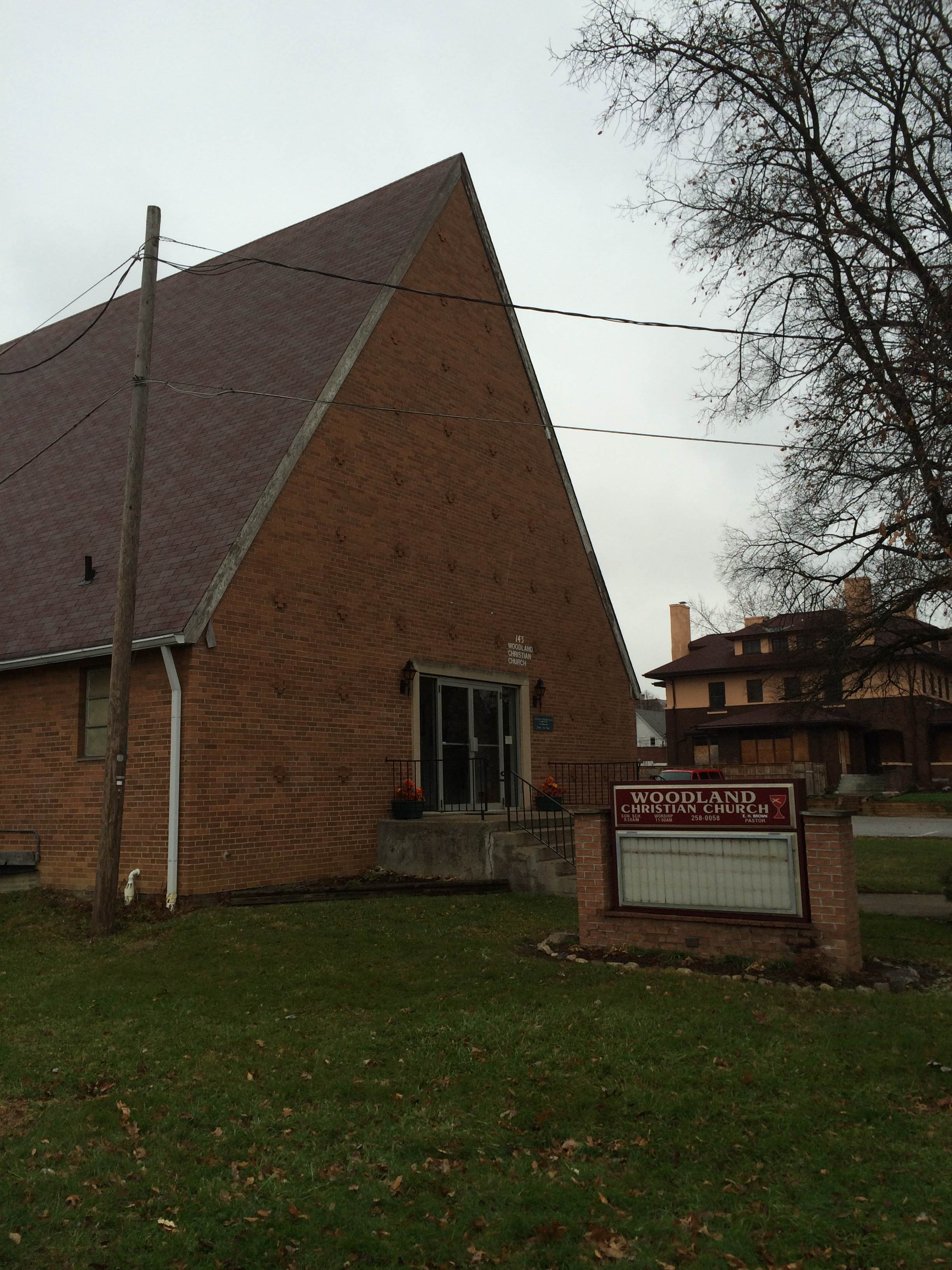
Woodland Christian Church

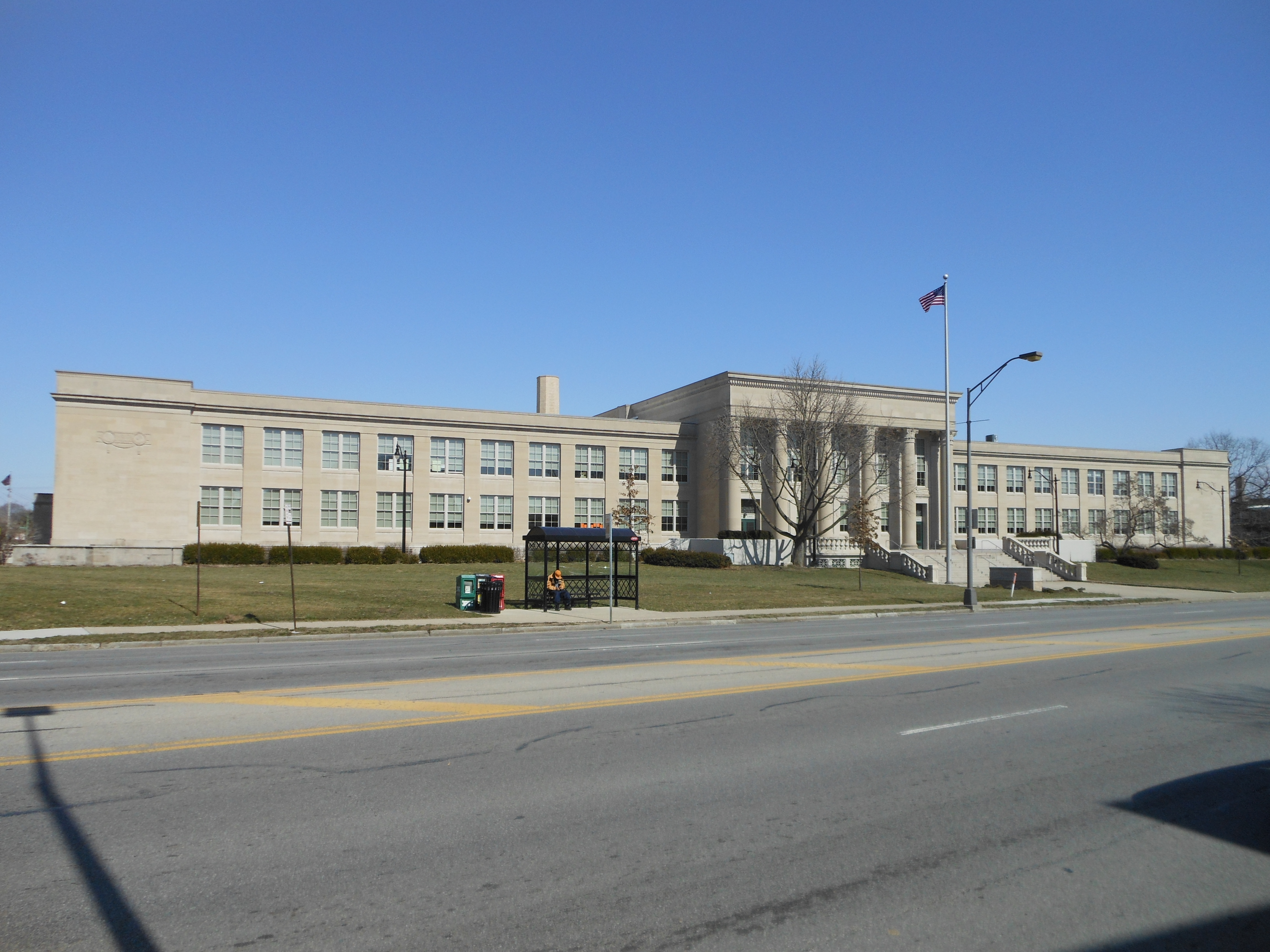
East High School

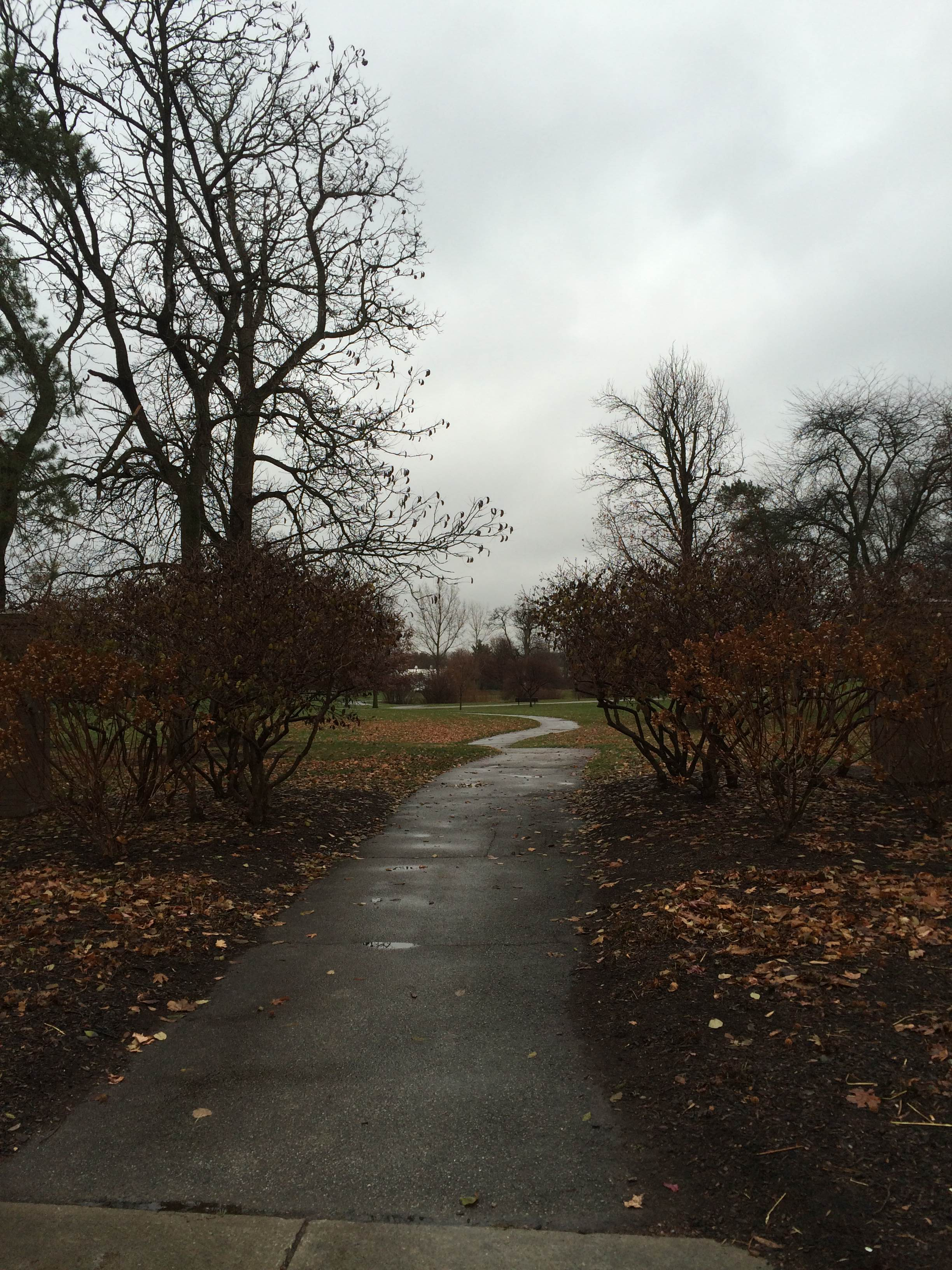
Franklin Park Conservatory pedestrian entry
