= Mt. Vernon Avenue Commercial Building =

- Interactive map of the Mt. Vernon Avenue Commercial Building area

General information
- Architectural style: Romanesque Revival, Georgian
- Location: 1533-1537 Mt. Vernon Avenue, Columbus, Ohio
- Coordinates: 39.974062°N 82.961337°W
- Estimated completion: 1900

The Mt. Vernon Avenue Commercial Building is a historic building in the Near East Side area of Columbus, Ohio. The building sits on Mount Vernon Avenue, between the modern-day neighborhoods of Mount Vernon and King-Lincoln Bronzeville.

== Attributes ==
The building sits at the southwest corner of Mount Vernon and Taylor avenues. It has elements of multiple architectural styles, including Romanesque arches, and Georgian features including an ornate cornice and parapet and denticulated upper windows.

== History ==
The structure dates to 1900. It was built as a boarding house for women. In the 1920s, it became the offices of the Accurate Measure Oil Co. It later served as a barbershop and drug store, and held a laundromat from 1962 to 1981. In the 1970s, it also held Lucy's Restaurant. Its most recent use was to hold the gallery of Ohio State University art professor Pheoris West. In 2016, the structure was sold to the nonprofit organization Partners Achieving Community Transformation (PACT). The site was subsequently listed as one of Columbus's most endangered historic sites, in the 2016 listing by Columbus Landmarks. Later that year, PACT hosted a community event to ascertain the community's desire to renovate or demolish the building and the Pilgrim Elementary School building. The attendees argued toward preserving the historic buildings where possible.
