= Leonard Pearl Henderson House =

Henderson House
- Interactive map of Henderson House
- Location: 1544 Atcheson Street, Columbus, Ohio
- Coordinates: 39.977588°N 82.962091°W
- Built: c. 1873 or 1920
- Owner: The Ohio State University (2022–present)

The Henderson House is a historic building in the Mount Vernon neighborhood of Columbus, Ohio. The house was built in the late 19th or early 20th century, and was notably owned by Leonard Pearl Henderson, who made the property a hub for traveling Black entertainers.

The building was at risk for demolition in 2022–2023, as the Ohio State University proposed building a rehabilitation center on the site.

== Attributes ==
The residential building on the property is made of brick, with two stories and 2,735 square feet (254.1 m^{2}). The building sits on a 5-acre lot, on a hill at Taylor Avenue and Atcheson Street, adjacent to the Wexner Medical Center's Outpatient Care East facility and just north of the Ohio State East Hospital.

During its operation as a bed and breakfast, the house had three guest rooms, as well as a coach house suite, over top of a two-car garage. The interior had a 1950s-style kitchen and a law library, with old volumes on Ohio law. Its furniture was mostly inherited, including a dining room set once owned by the family of president Andrew Jackson. The entrance hall had a long winding staircase with low rails, attributed to the age of the house. The front yard had a century-old buckeye tree. Its backyard included a flower garden, walking path, and off-street parking. Food preparation for the inn was run by its owner LeNora Henderson-Johnson, with lawn care and maintenance by her husband, Caney Johnson. The bed and breakfast catered to short- and long-term guests, meetings, and parties.

The building is described in news media as a historic Black landmark and a site deeply intertwined with Columbus's Black history.

== History ==
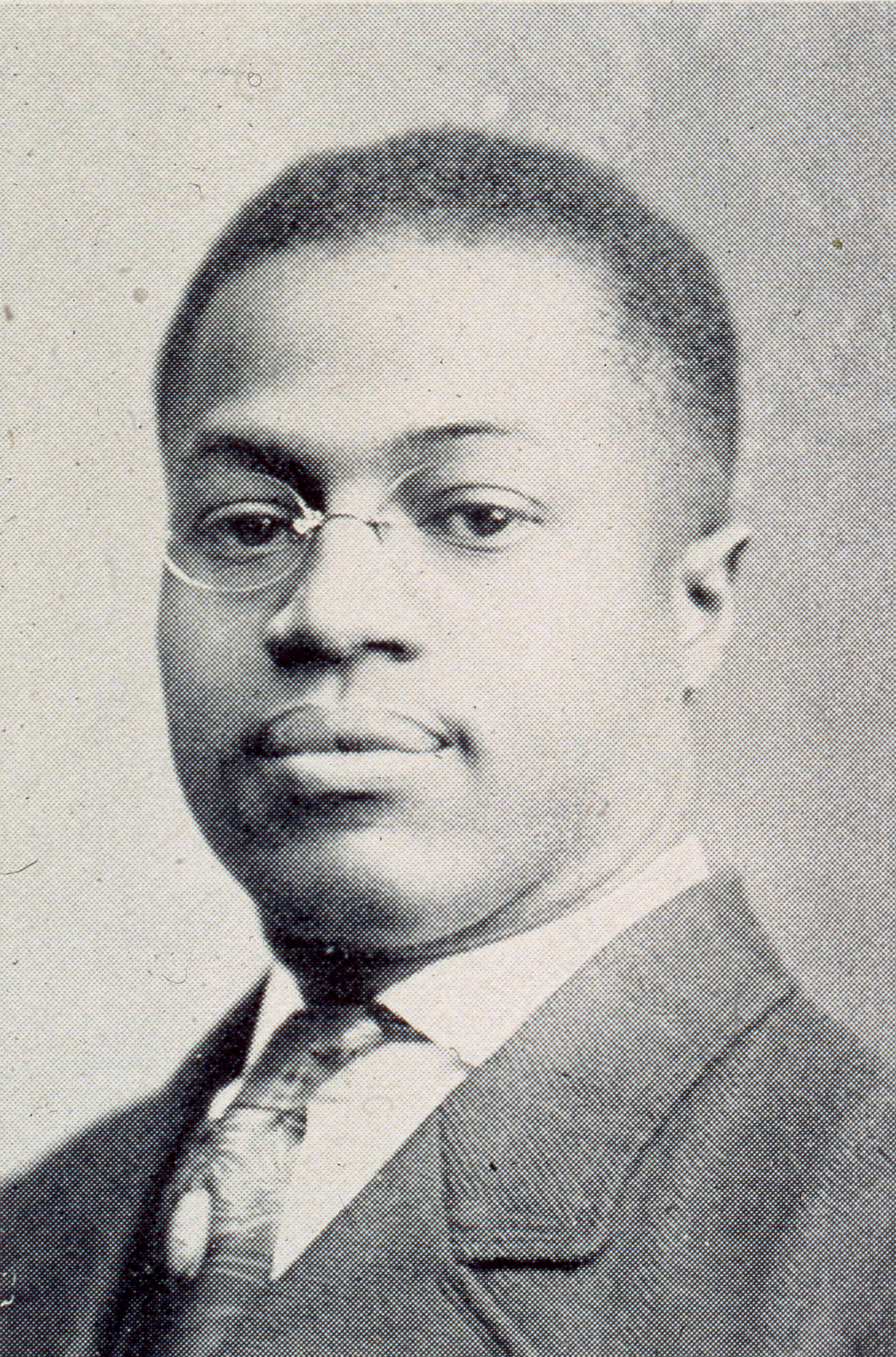
Leonard Pearl Henderson

The house was built around or before 1873, according to The Columbus Dispatch; or in 1920, according to the Franklin County Auditor's office. The property was once farmland, owned by the family of former U.S. President and Ohio Governor Rutherford B. Hayes beginning in 1873. It became part of his 66-acre farm there, once far outside of Columbus. Hayes likely never lived there, though his family may have.

In 1942, it was sold to and became home to prominent local attorney Leonard Pearl Henderson, an employee of the Franklin County Probate Court and operator of a law firm in Downtown Columbus, and his wife Ferne Henderson, a singer. By the time of his death, he was the oldest practicing African American attorney in Ohio. Henderson made the house an informal social hub for traveling African American entertainers and celebrities including Louis Armstrong, Wilt Chamberlain, Duke Ellington, Joe Louis, and Cab Calloway during the era of segregation. Beginning on July 5, 1995, the house became the first Black-owned bed and breakfast in Ohio, owned by Henderson's daughter LeNora Henderson-Johnson and operating until 2017. It was believed to be the only Black-owned bed and breakfast in Ohio in 1997. In 1998, the Henderson House Bed & Breakfast was featured in the magazine Black Enterprise as one of the bed & breakfasts that caters to Black people.

In 2017, Henderson-Johnson sold the house and property for $800,000 to the Partners Achieving Community Transformation (PACT, an organization that includes Ohio State, the city government, and the local housing authority), which aims to revitalize the area around the hospital. The house has been vacant for several years, and was not maintained under the organization's ownership.

In August 2021, the Ohio State University approved plans to purchase the property, hoping for future development on the site. It purchased it from the Partners Achieving Community Transformation for $1 in January 2022. In August 2022, Ohio State proposed building a three-story, 80-bed, 86,000-square-foot (8,000 m^{2}) rehabilitation center on a 2.6-acre site including the Henderson property, and which would require demolition of the Henderson House, despite Ohio State's ownership of a 5-acre site nearby. The hospital would open in 2025, replacing the 60-bed Dodd Rehabilitation Hospital on Ohio State's main campus. Amid news of the proposed demolition, Ohio State released a statement that it cherishes the site's history and would receive community input in finding a way to honor the location's history, stories, and legacy. In February 2023, the university proposed a zoning change to allow the hospital construction to the Near East Area Commission, and later announced it is postponing its project as submitted. The proposed demolition spurred resistance from residents of the Near East Side area, as well as from the Columbus Landmarks Foundation. In May 2023, the university announced it was no longer considering demolishing the house. The Columbus Landmarks Foundation listed the Henderson House as an endangered site in June 2023, in the 2023 edition of its Most Endangered List.
