= Mount Vernon (Columbus, Ohio) =

Neighborhood in Columbus, Ohio

- Neighborhood of Columbus, Ohio
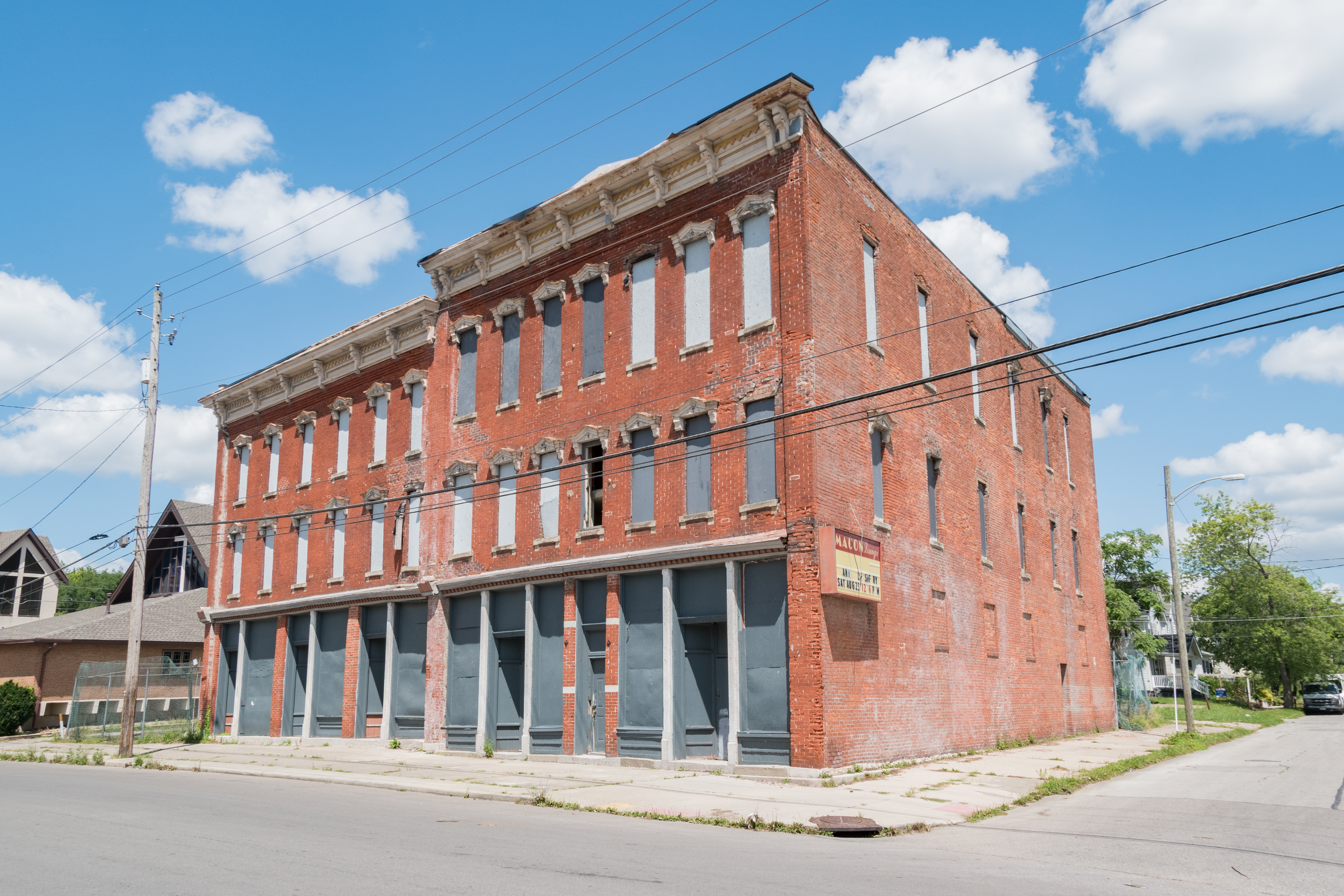
- The Macon Hotel
- Interactive map pinpointing the approximate neighborhood center
- Coordinates: 40°N 83°W
- Country: United States
- State: Ohio
- County: Franklin
- City: Columbus

Mount Vernon is a predominantly African-American historic neighborhood in Columbus, Ohio, United States. The neighborhood lies within the historic Near East Side community, north of King-Lincoln Bronzeville. Mount Vernon borders Interstates 71 and 670. Its main thoroughfares, Mount Vernon Avenue, Long Street, Atcheson Street, and Champion Avenue define the community's limits.

The neighborhood is named for Mount Vernon Avenue, the center of a once-thriving economy. In the 19th century into the 1970s, the area (including the present-day King-Lincoln Bronzeville) held thousands of Black families and businesses, with a variety of businesses lining the avenue. It was during an era of segregation and isolation for the community, and thus Black families were self-sustaining in the area. Beginning in the 1950s, interstate highways were constructed in Columbus. The highways physically divided parts of the neighborhood and their large land uses forced families and businesses to relocate, leading to more vacancies and an overall neighborhood decline.

The Leonard Pearl Henderson House in the neighborhood is a historically-significant house near an Ohio State University medical center. The building was proposed for demolition in 2023.

The neighborhood also includes a large apartment complex, Latitude Five25. The complex was formerly a public housing project called Sawyer Towers. It was privatized in 2009 and renovated into Skyview Towers, and changed hands twice again. In 2023, following numerous violations, the city attempted to force the owners to pay for its long-needed repairs, and ended up deeming the towers unsafe, forcing its residents to relocate.

== Gallery ==
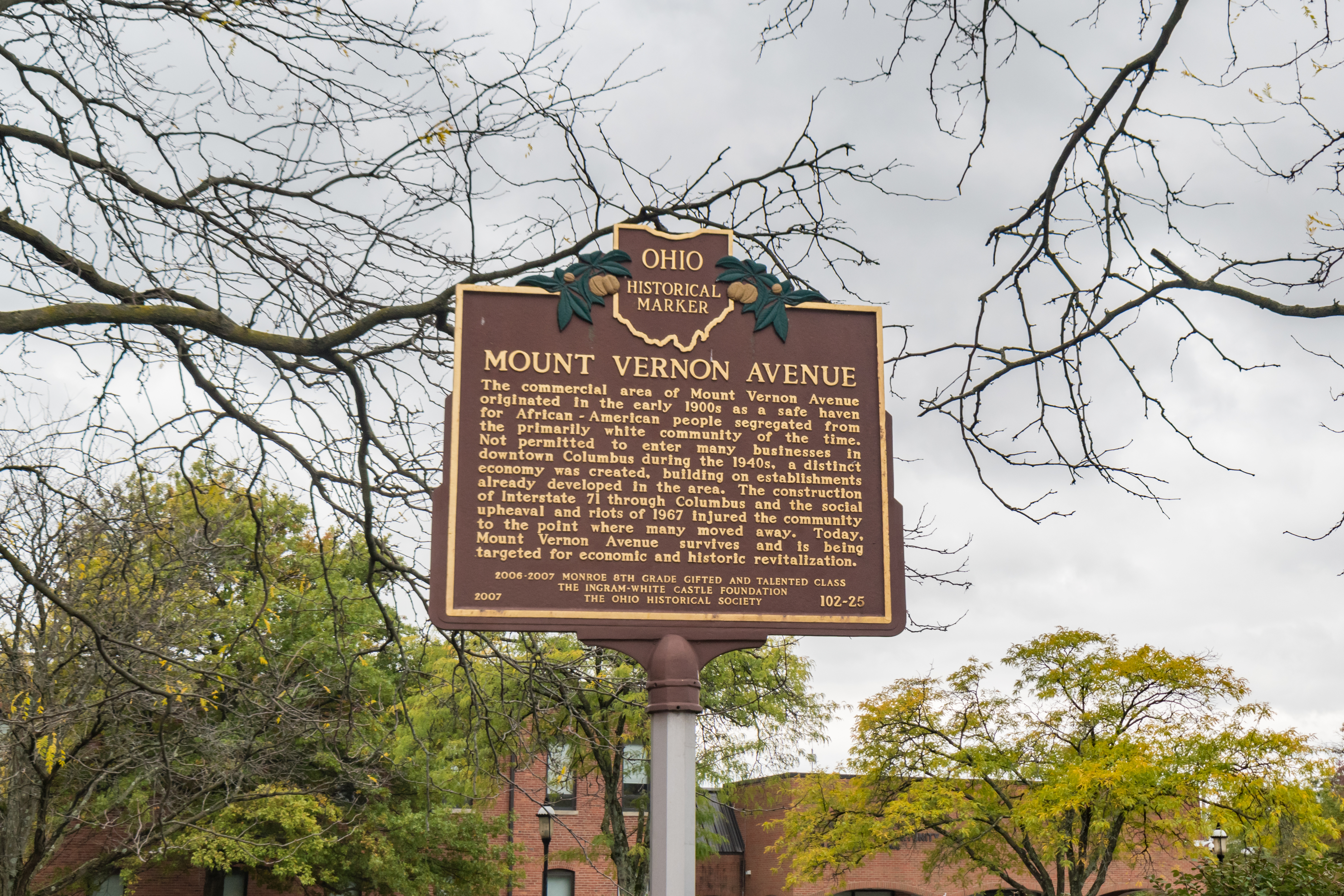
Historical marker

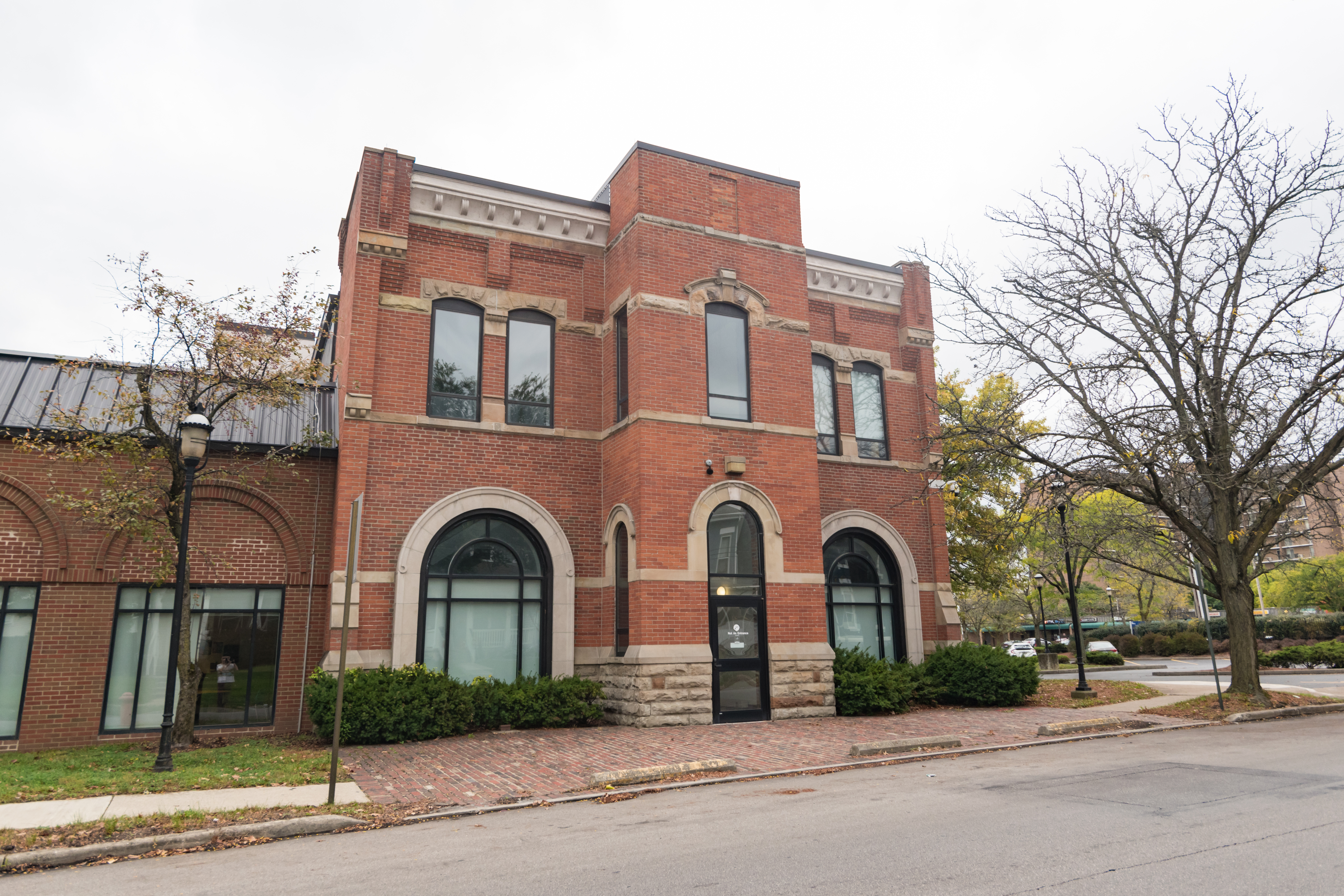
Former Engine House No. 8

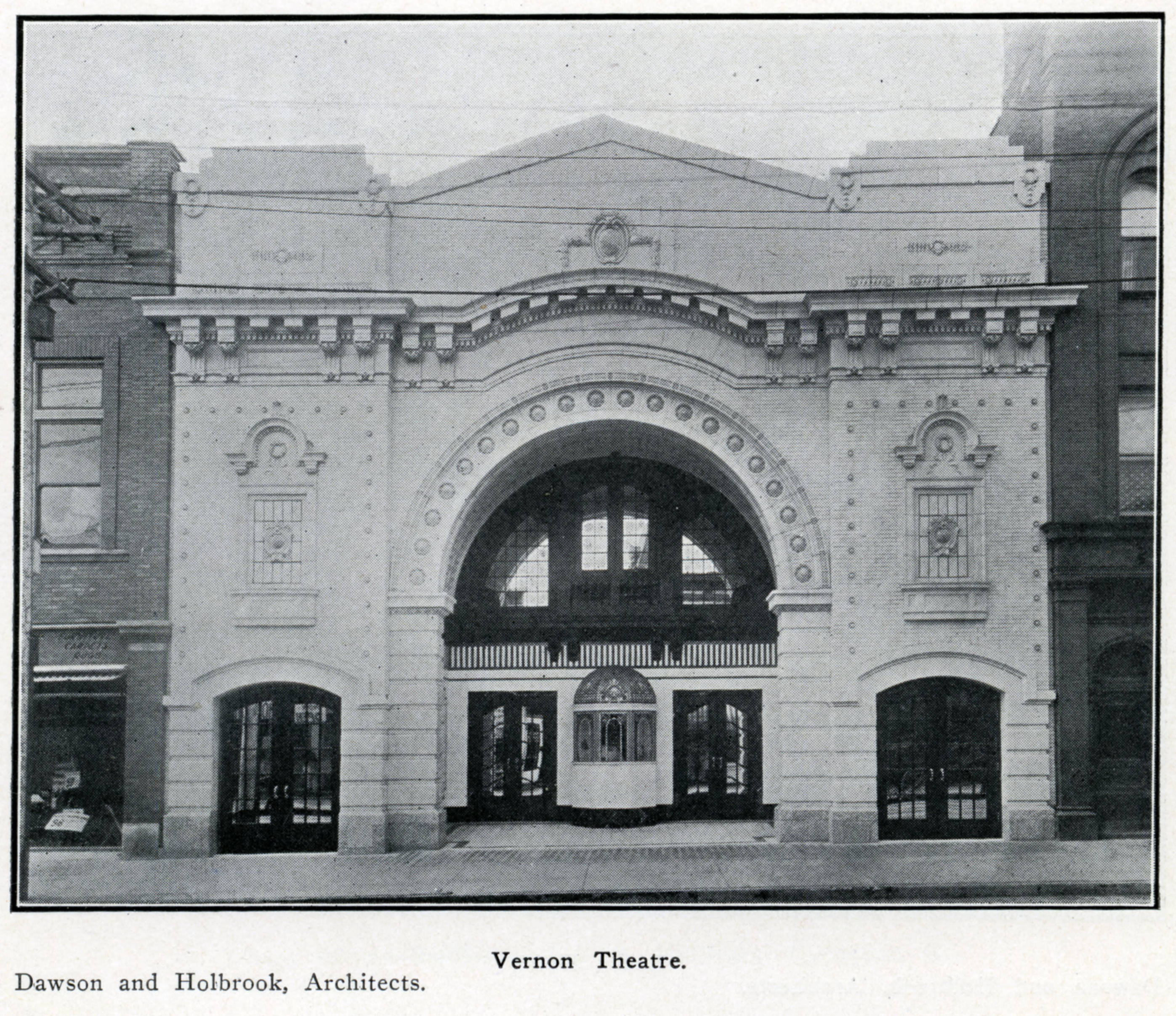
The Vernon (later Cameo) Theatre, 1914

The Felton School

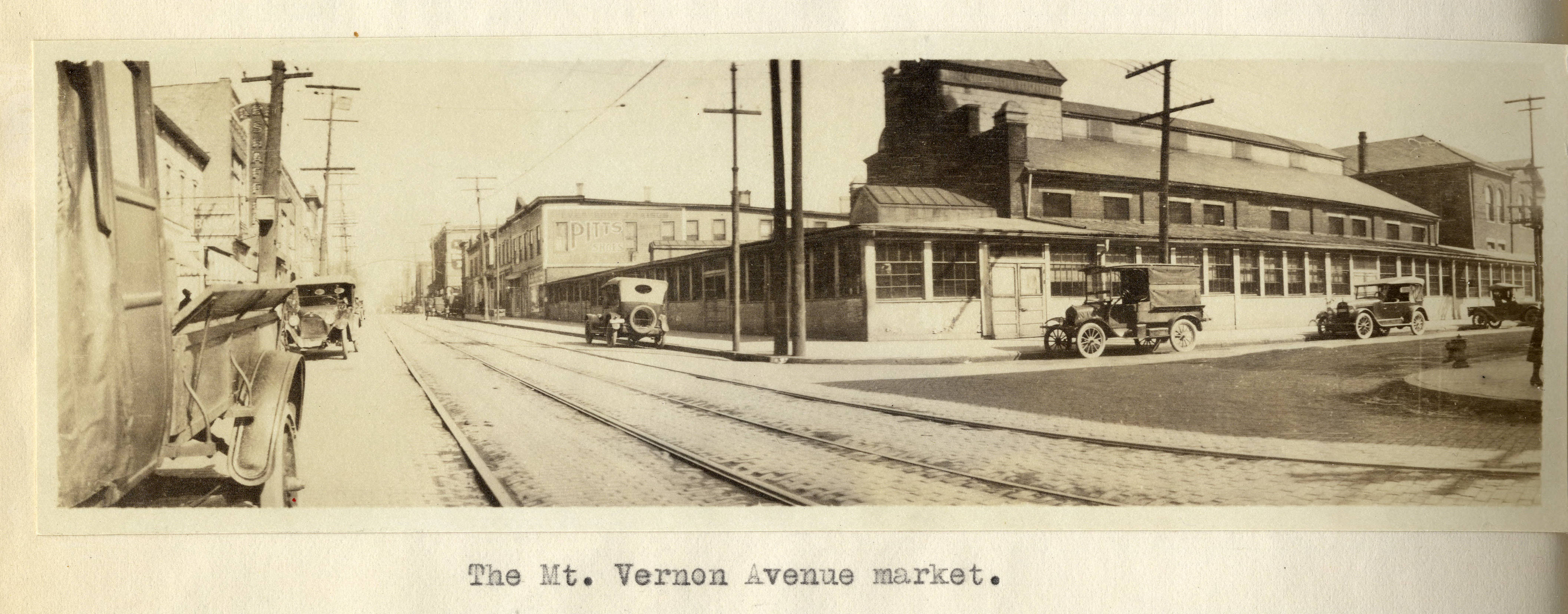
Mt. Vernon Avenue in 1922; the East End Market House is at the right

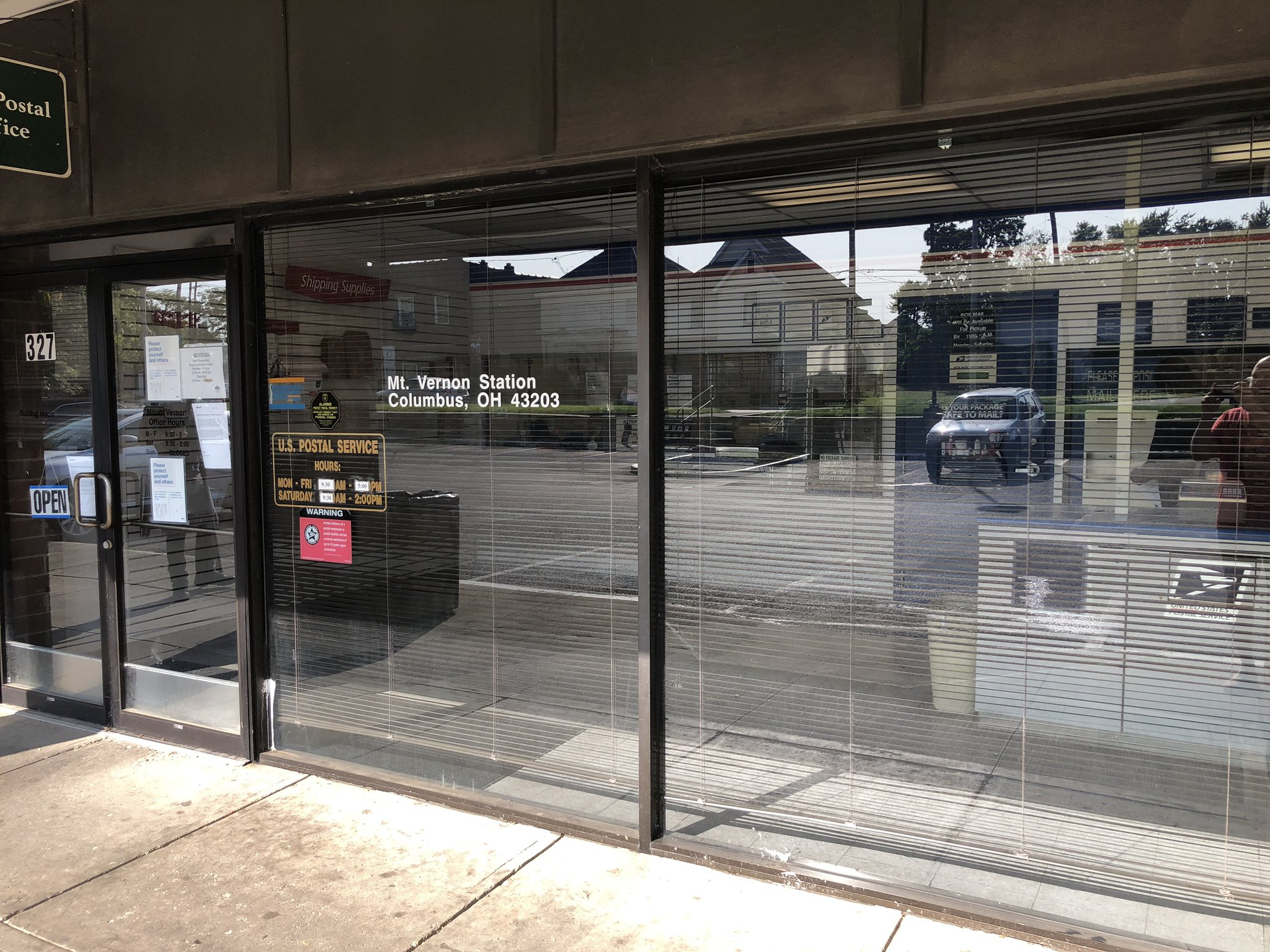
Mt. Vernon post office

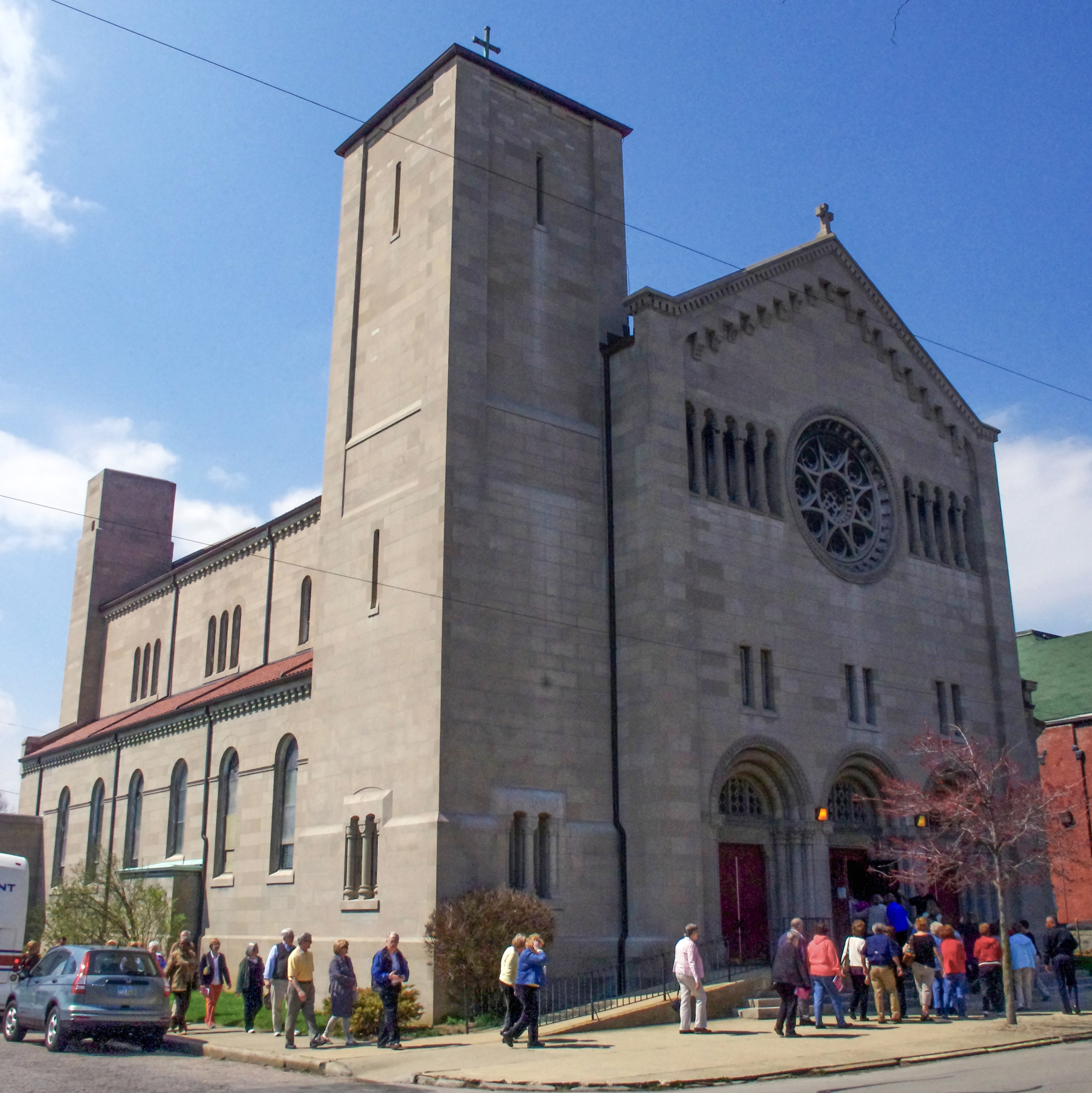
Saint Dominic Catholic Church

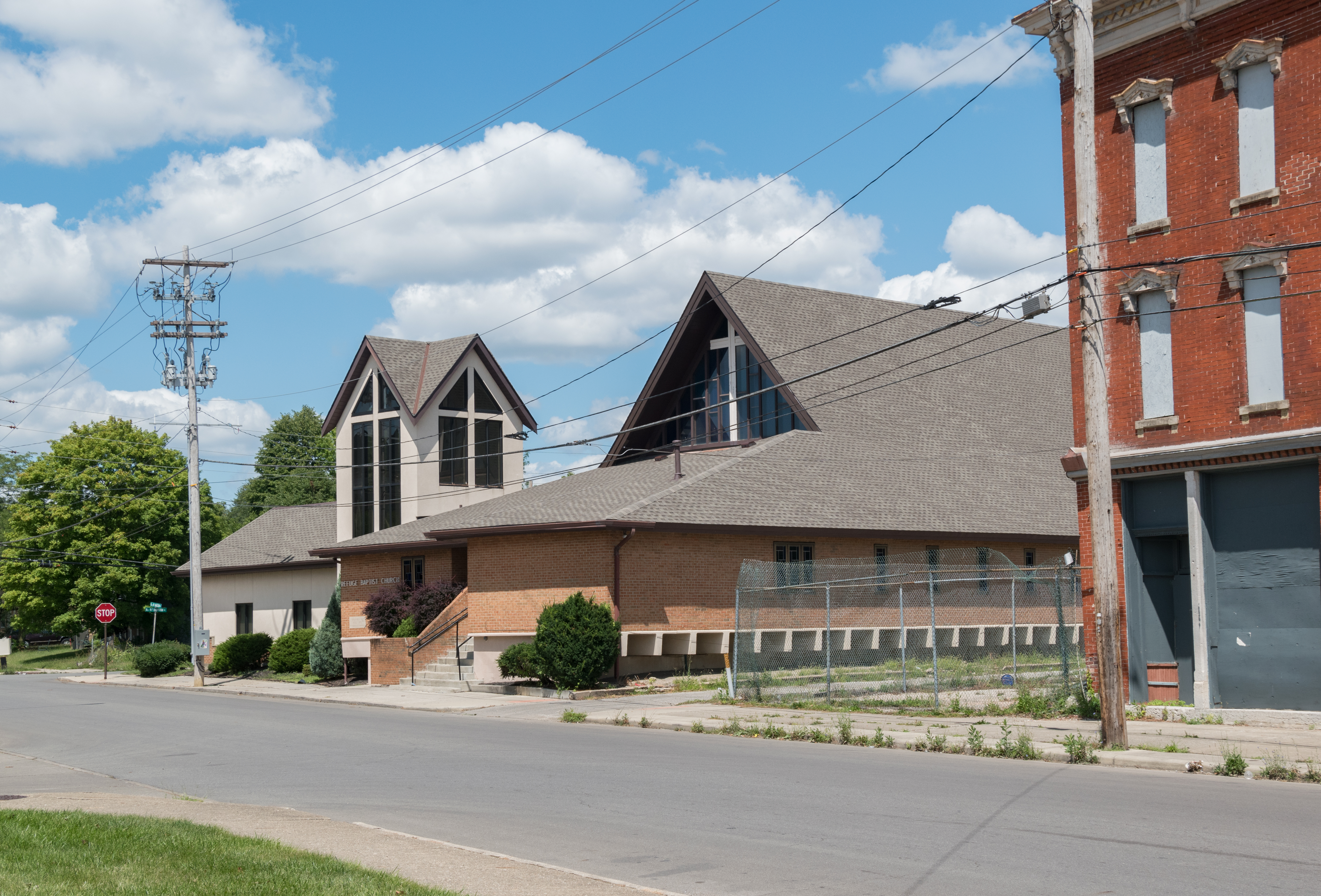
Refuge Baptist Church

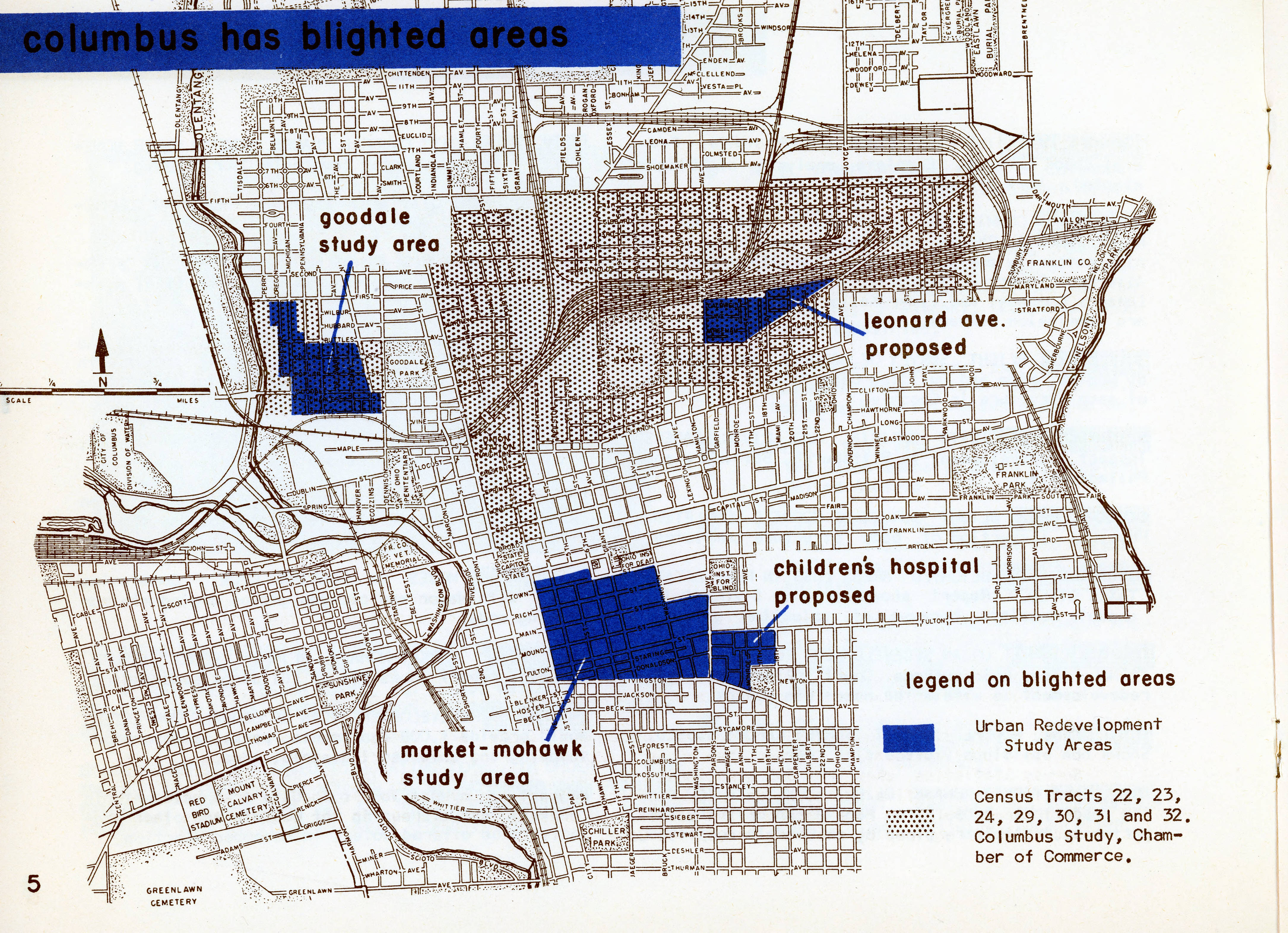
Mount Vernon, part of the shaded area redeveloped in the 1950s

== See also ==
- Mt. Vernon Avenue Commercial Building
