= Near East Side, Columbus, Ohio =

Neighborhood in Columbus, Ohio, U.S.

Coordinates: 39°58′N 82°58′W

Interactive map of the neighborhood

The Near East Side is a neighborhood located near downtown Columbus, Ohio, made up of several neighborhoods: Mount Vernon, King-Lincoln Bronzeville, Eastgate, Franklin Park, Nelson Park, Olde Towne East, and Woodland Park.

== History ==
Following the Civil War, the city of Columbus began to grow at unprecedented rates. The development of the street car transit system changed the footprint of the city, as more residents were able to live further away from their place of employment. Areas along major arterial routes grew even more, and the edge of the city was pushed out to Alum Creek (due to annexation). At this time the Near East was a prestigious and wealthy community, containing many large and luxurious homes, successful businesses, and a thriving artist community.

By the 1920s the Near East area had developed its own identity and a collection of unique neighborhoods. Hamilton Park and Long Street became a wealthy African American neighborhood filled with stores, theatres, offices, restaurants, and numerous clubs and lounges featuring jazz music.

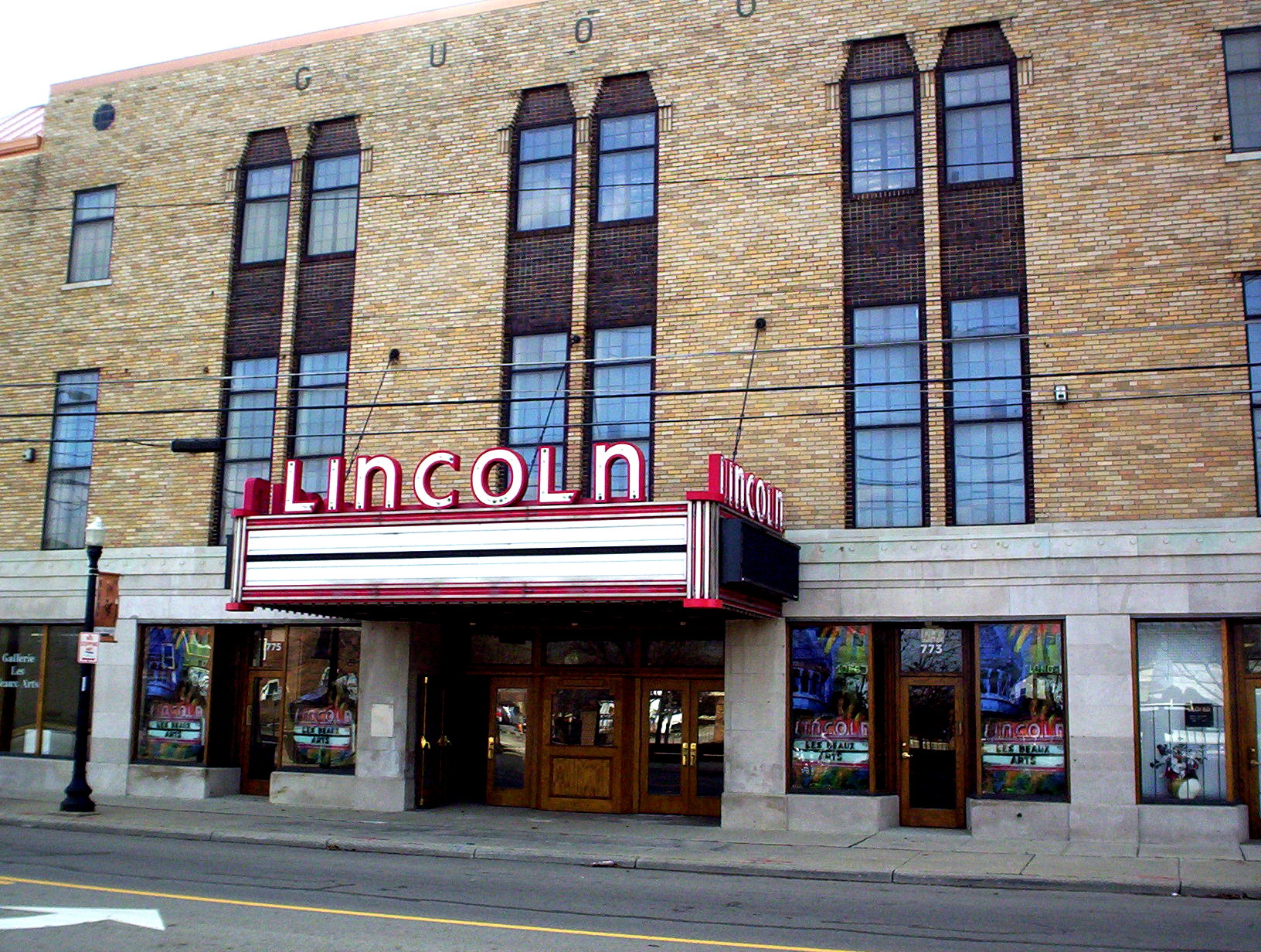
The historic Lincoln Theatre

The area had five movie houses located close to one another: Dunbar Theater at Mount Vernon and Champion avenues; The Cameo, on Mount Vernon Ave near 20th, which prohibited African Americans from entering; The Pythian Theater, on Mount Vernon near Monroe and Garfield, which is now the King Arts Complex; and Lincoln Theater and Empress Theater on Long Street near Hamilton Park.

By the early 1940s, Poindexter Village, one of the nation's first public housing projects, was opened in the Near East. It was named after Reverend James Preston Poindexter, the first African American City Council Member of Columbus.

The increased interest in and ownership of the automobile continued to change the Near East Side, as sprawl, regional shopping centers, and suburbs altered the character of cities. Two of the most dramatic events in the Near East were the construction of the interstate highways in the 1960s; Interstate 71 North and South, and Interstate 70 East and West. The new construction served as a hard barrier to the area, which further separated Broad Street from the rest of downtown. However, highway exits directly into the area further spurred development and simultaneously ended the use of Broad St as the main East-West travel road. The East Side On Columbus’ East Side is a bulk of the city’s urban community as the Columbus Ohio ghetto expands from multiple communities including the King Lincoln neighborhood, or Bronzeville, and into areas of the far East Side along either James Road or Livingston.

Over the years the East Side would become infamous for the old Uzi Alley and Poindexter housing complexes, as well a number other ‘hoods from Trevitt N Atcheson to Elaine Road.

== Geography ==
The Near East is bounded by I-670 to the North, I-70 to the South, Alum Creek to the East, and I-71 to the West. The area is approximately 2.5 square miles and occupies the space directly east of the original city laid out in 1812.

U.S. Route 40 is an east-west U.S. Highway, which once traversed the entire country and passes through Columbus along Main St. It was built on top of existing freeways, such as the Historic National Road, which connected Zanesville to Columbus in 1833, and Columbus to Springfield in 1838.

== Development ==
The City of Columbus has designated the Near East Side as a Community Reinvestment Area that is "ready for revitalization", with available 15-year, 100 percent tax abatements for all projects that include 10 percent affordable housing, with options to buy out of the requirement.

== Demographics ==
The Near East side is bounded by two zip codes: 43203 and 43205.

As of the 2010 Census, 20,380 residents live in the 43203 and 43205 zip codes. There are 12,368 housing units in the Near East; roughly 30% of these units are unoccupied. Nearly 70% of the units in the Near East are Renter Occupied.

== Education ==
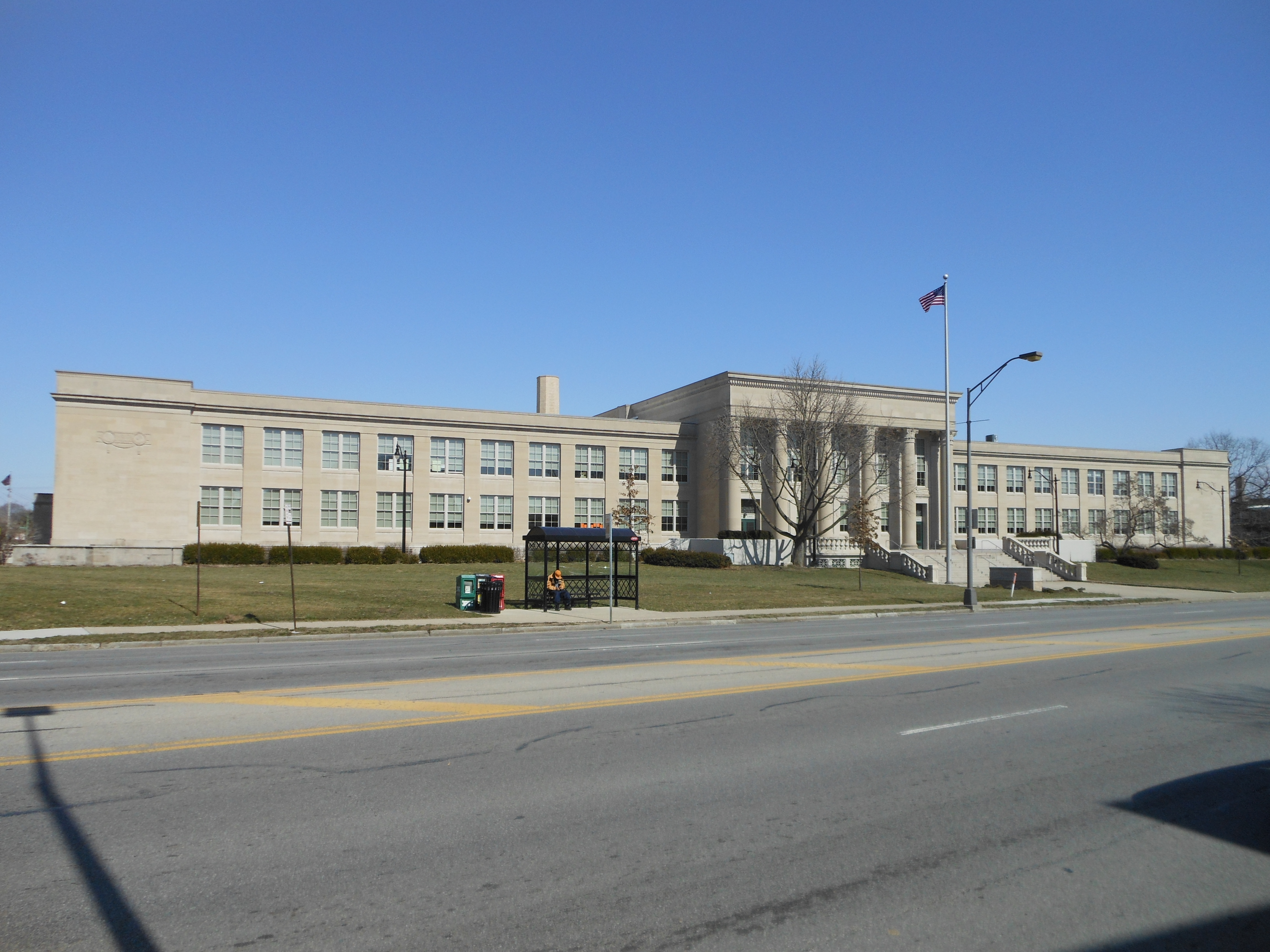
East High School in Woodland Park

The Near East is home to two elementary schools, Eastgate Elementary and Beatty Park Elementary; two middle schools, Champion Middle and United Schools Network charter school Columbus Collegiate Academy; and one high school, East High School.

== Historic districts ==
=== Columbus Near East Side District ===
The Columbus Near East Side District was listed on the National Register of Historic Places in 1978.

==== Bryden Road District ====
The Bryden Road District was established as a local historic district in 1990. It was initially met with apprehension, for fear of certain historical aspects being erased from the area. The Bryden Road District is subject to architectural review by the City of Columbus Historic Resources Commission. Bryden Road was renamed in order to thwart the expansion of the streetcar through the neighborhood; on one side it is Town Street and on the other side of Parsons Ave it is Bryden Road. The Bryden Road District runs east-west through both the Franklin Park and Olde Towne East neighborhoods. The area once was referred to as the "Silk Stocking District" because of the display of prosperity and opulence. More than 50 architectural styles can be found along Bryden Road, including French, German and Renaissance influence.

=== East Broad Street Historic District ===
The East Broad Street Historic District is a historic district that was listed on the National Register of Historic Places in 1987. It includes the section of East Broad Street from Ohio Avenue on the west to Monypenny Street on the east.

== Neighborhoods ==
=== Beatty Park (Mt. Vernon Avenue District) ===
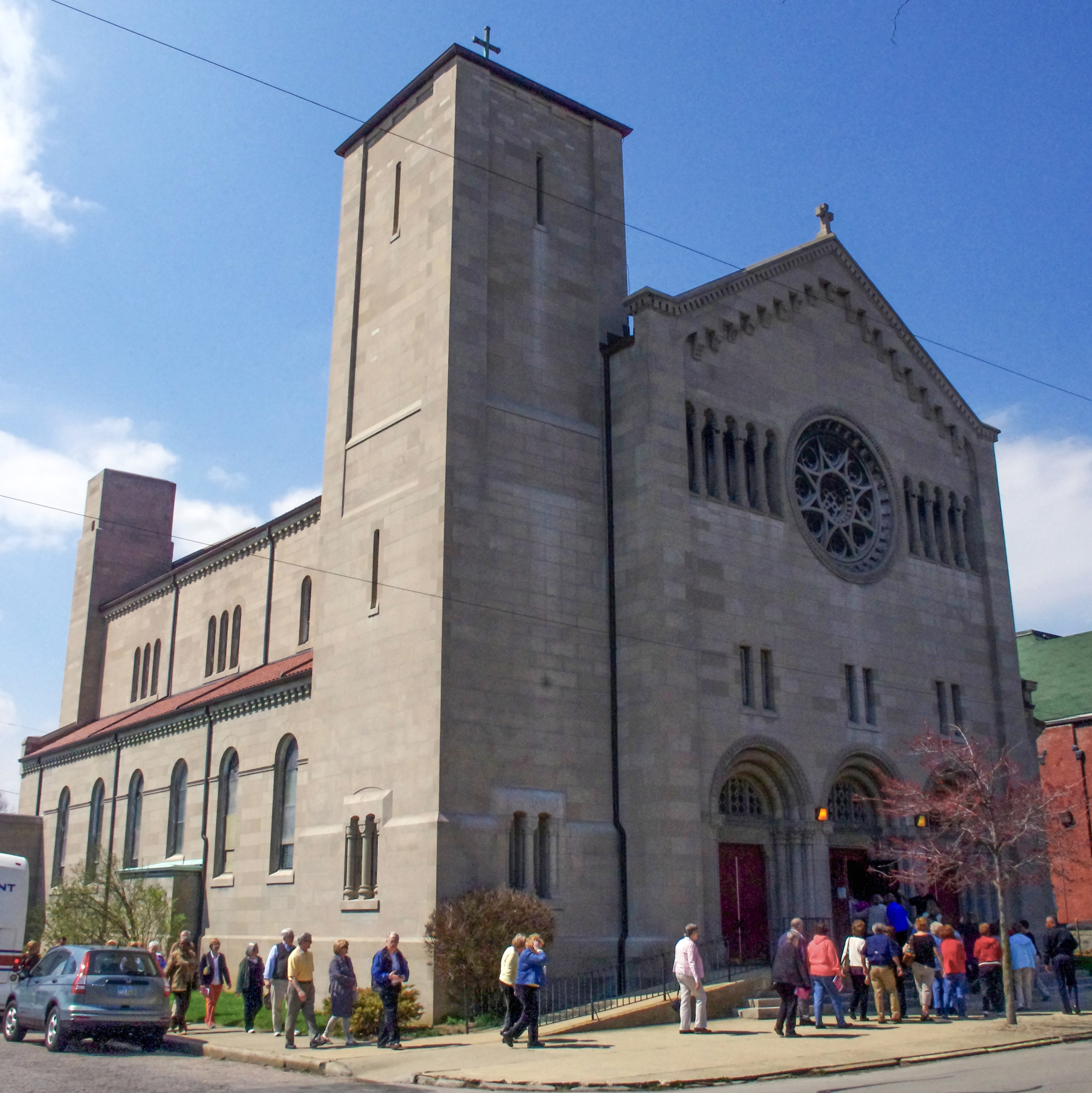
St. Dominic Roman Catholic Church is a historic landmark in Mount Vernon.

Mount Vernon lies within the historic Near East Side community. It borders interstates 71 and 670. Its main thoroughfares, Mount Vernon Avenue, East Long Street, Atcheson Street, and Champion Avenue define the community's limits. It is a part of the Bronzeville area and had a strong African American and Jewish community.

=== Eastgate and Nelson Park ===
Developed in 1916, the Eastgate neighborhood includes Nelson Park, Eastgate Elementary School, and the intersection of East Broad Street and Nelson Road. It is commonly referred to as both Eastgate and Nelson Park.

=== Eastwood Heights ===
Eastwood Heights is bordered by Taylor Ave on the east, East Broad Street on the South, Hawthorne Ave on the north and Hughes St. on the west.

=== Franklin Park ===
This neighborhood is bounded by East Broad Street to the north, East Main Street to the south, and Wilson Avenue to the west.

The Alum Creek tributary separates the Franklin Park neighborhood from the City of Bexley and the area originally known as the "Wolfe Addition to Franklin Park," which is known in modern times as the Wolfe Park neighborhood. The Holtzman Main business district along the west bank of Alum Creek within the Franklin Park neighborhood.

Franklin Park is surrounded on the north by the other Near East neighborhoods of Eastgate, Nelson Park, Woodland Park, Eastwood Heights, and Bronzeville/King-Lincoln.

To the south are Hanford Village, Driving Park, and Old Oaks, which are both considered to be Columbus' Near South.

Olde Towne East is another Near East neighborhood that is situated between the Discovery and Market Districts of downtown Columbus and the Franklin Park neighborhood.

=== Hamilton Park ===
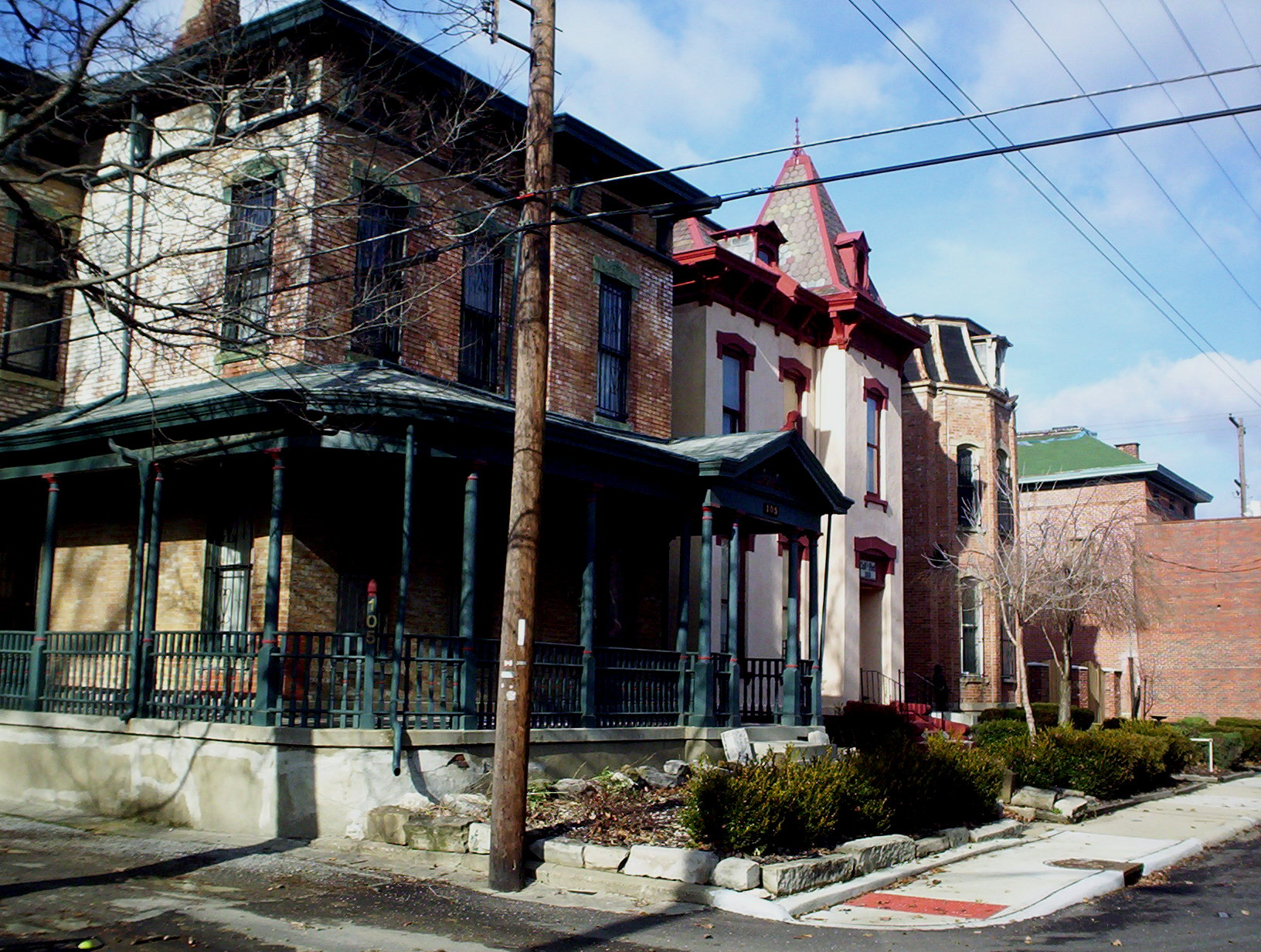
Houses in Hamilton Park

This historic neighborhood is located along Hamilton Park Avenue, between East Broad and East Long streets. The area was one of four residential areas built around "park-like boulevards." Due to the construction of the interstate, only 3 remain. The area was predominantly African American and was attractive to certain groups because of the area's proximity to the railroad tracks, which provided transportation and work. The area features unique architectural elements such as conical turrets, ironic columns, frieze windows, projecting bays, contrasting stone trim and tall chimneys...

=== Hanford Village ===
Hanford Village has been placed on the National Register of Historic Places. Originally founded as a village in 1909 and annexed by Columbus in 1955, Hanford was marketed to African American veterans, but much of the neighborhood was wiped out in the 1960s when I-70 was constructed.

=== Holtzman-Main ===
The area is located between Nelson Road and the west bank of the Alum Creek tributary within the Franklin Park Neighborhood. It is an old industrial district, which has plain buildings, lacks landscaping, and has narrow streets and alleys. The area is mainly commercial with businesses that include day care centers, a social service agency, catalog distribution, automotive repair services, car washes, a fuel center, and fast food and grocery. The Northern boundary of the area is Clowsen Field, Capital University's baseball diamond. A revitalization plan exists with recommendations to make aesthetic improvements and utilize the area as a gateway into the Franklin Park neighborhood and Near East.

=== King-Lincoln Bronzeville ===
Just east of Downtown Columbus, this area is bordered by the Mount Vernon neighborhood and Atcheson Street on the north, North 20th Street on the east, Olde Towne East and East Broad Street on the south, and Interstate 71 on the west. The area was at one time much larger, including parts of what is now the Discovery District. The creation of I-71 significantly cut the area off from Downtown, causing socioeconomic decline and the growth of crime and violence. The neighborhood has become the focus of the city's revitalization efforts which include renovation of the historic Lincoln Theatre, construction of new condos and expansion of retail space along Mt. Vernon Avenue and East Long Street, which hosts the annual Long Street Tour cycling event.

=== Old Oaks ===
Old Oaks is a historic street car neighborhood which started its growth when streetcar service became electrified in 1891. The area was designated a historic neighborhood in 1986.

=== Olde Towne East ===
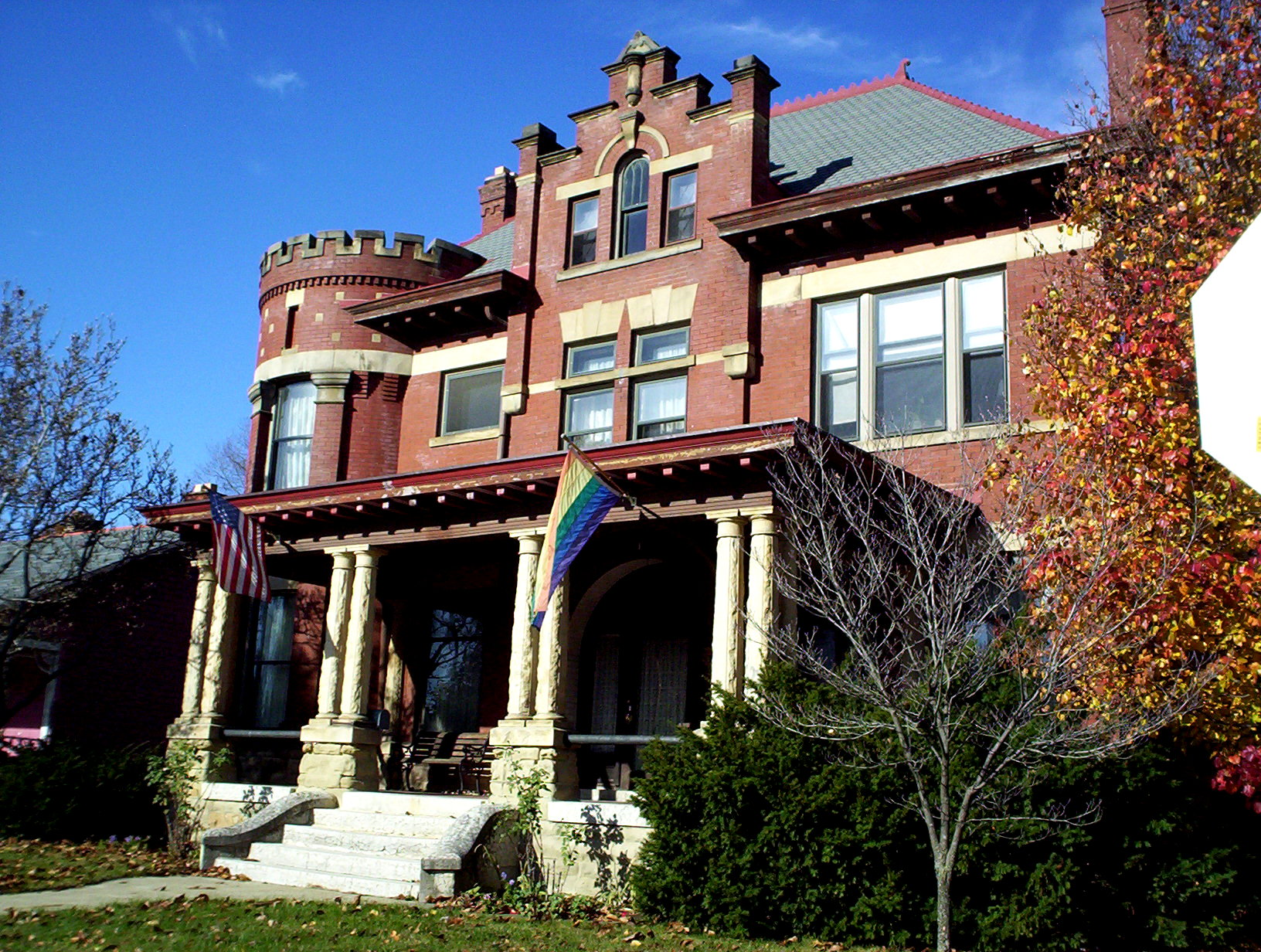
A mansion in Olde Towne East.

Olde Towne East is a neighborhood located in the historical Near East Side. It is one of Columbus' largest and oldest neighborhoods. Nestled between Downtown, Bexley, Old Oaks and South of Main. The area has over 1,000 homes, some as old as the 1830s, and more than 50 architectural styles including Italianate, Queen Anne and Victorian.

=== South of Main ===
South of Main is a neighborhood located in the Near East Side. It is bounded by Main Street to the north, Interstate 70 to the south, the west bank of Alum Creek to the east, and Wilson Avenue to the west. Hanford Village, which was divided and decimated with the construction of I-70 in the 1950s, was once part of what is now known as the South of Main neighborhood. The most distinctive landmark at the far northeastern corner of the neighborhood is the cluster of silos that once stored grain and are now owned and used by Omni Materials.

=== Woodland Park ===
This is the area bordered by Maryland Avenue to the north, Nelson Road to the east, East Broad Street to the south, and Taylor Avenue to the west. According to the Woodland Park Neighborhood Association website: "The neighborhood is home to an eclectic mixture of exquisite architecture including Colonial, Federal, Arts and Crafts, Victorian, Tudor, Mission, Dutch Colonial, Colonial Revival, Greek Revival, Georgian Colonial, French Eclectic, American Foursquare and Cape Cod. The neighborhood is composed of homes, town-homes and apartments ranging in size from massive mansions to bungalows and from penthouses to studio apartments. This diverse mixture of homes makes Woodland Park a comfortable, affordable and attractive neighborhood to live in."

== Structures and landmarks ==
The Near East area features over 1,000 unique homes with at least 50 different architectural styles. The Bryden Road and Broad Street corridors were once home to some of the wealthiest citizens with the most decadent homes, influenced by Queen Ane, Italianette, French, German, and Renaissance styles.

- East High School – located on E Broad St, built 1922. Landmark status. Important to African American communities in Columbus. Famous Ohio State footballer Chic Harley graduated from here.
- Spring Street YMCA / Ward Home and Storage Facilities. – founded 1919. One of the first to specifically serve the black community. The E.E. Ward Moving Company is the oldest African American owned and operated business, still operating today, in the country.
- Lincoln Theatre – located on Long Street, opened in 1929 by Al Jackson.
- Macon Hotel – located in the Bronzeville area, serves as a cultural landmark of the 1930s jazz club scene of the Near East side. Its prominence declined after the construction of I-70, when it was cut off from the rest of the neighborhood.
- Ohio School for the Blind – originally downtown, Columbus was home of "...the first publicly supported school for the blind in the United States." A second building was constructed at Parsons and Main St. It currently serves as the Columbus Department of Health building.
- Poindexter Village / "Blackberry Patch" - originally an area for African Americans to settle after arriving from the Great Migration. It was a shanty town filled with homes constructed from pieces of scrap wood. In 1941 President Roosevelt dedicated the nation's first public housing complex, Poindexter Village.
- Pythian Temple and James Pythian Theater - located on Mt. Vernon Avenue and now existing as a portion of The King Arts Complex since 1987 along with the former Garfield Elementary School. The theater was erected by the Pythian Temple Society and opened on January 10, 1926. The architect, Samuel Plato, was a pioneer as one of the first African-American architects to have designed structure built in Columbus. The building is of Colonial Revival style and was added to the National Register of Historic Places on November 25, 1983.
- Urban Cultural Arts Foundation – established 1978, and is the oldest Black-owned gallery in Columbus.

== Parks ==
Twelve parks, covering 165 acres, are within the Near East Area.

=== Academy Park ===
Located on South Nelson Rd and adjacent to Wolf Park, Academy Park features for-lease baseball diamonds, soccer fields, basketball courts, a trail head, open green space, and Clowson Field. An indoor recreation center is located in the northern area of the park, which provides space for indoor athletic activities.

=== Beatty Park ===
Located on North Ohio Ave, Beatty Park features an indoor recreation center, outdoor playground equipment, basketball courts, well-lit tennis courts, and green space for family friendly activities.

=== Blackburn Park ===
Located on Carpenter Street, this park features a sprayground, basketball courts, green space, tennis courts, playground equipment, an indoor recreation center, and picnic space for families.

=== English Park/Kwanzaa Playground ===
English Park was so named as it was the site of the home of the English family, and is now home to the Kwanzaa Playground that was developed in 1995 as a joint effort between the community and the City of Columbus. Seven local artists and sculptors contributed the design and construction. The park has a human-like shape representing mankind's first ancestor. The playground underwent renovation by the Columbus Division of Parks and Recreation at a cost exceeding $300,000. The park focuses on positive African-American imagery to embrace the concept that "It takes a whole village to raise a child."

=== Franklin Park Conservatory ===
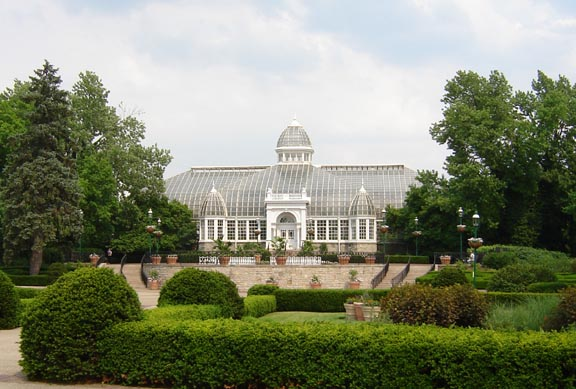
Franklin Park Conservatory.

The Franklin Park Conservatory is a botanical garden and conservatory located in Columbus, Ohio. It is open daily and an admission fee is charged. Originally built in 1895, the Conservatory is on the National Register of Historic Places. Today, it is a horticultural and educational institution showcasing exotic plant collections, special exhibitions, and Dale Chihuly artworks.

=== Hanford Village Park ===
Located on Alum Creek Drive, this small community park features basketball courts, a playground, and picnic and green space for family friendly activities.

=== Linwood Park ===
Located on Linwood Ave, this park is a "pocket park" which features a paved path and benches. The park is maintained by the community.

=== "Pumphouse" Park ===
Located on E Main St, this park was formerly named Main-Alum Park. This park is the site of a water pumping station for Columbus, and is maintained by Bexley. It is also the former site of the Norwood Amusement Park. The park features open-air shelters, greenway trail access, and athletic fields/green space for family friendly activities.

=== Mayme Moore Park ===
Located on Martin Luther King Jr Blvd, features the Amos Lynch Plaza, which is utilized by the King Arts Complex, and is leased by the Garfield School. It is used by the community for gatherings, activities and celebrations. The park also features a gazebo named the Beatty Pavilion. The park has a playground, green space, and picnic space for family friendly activities.

=== Nelson Park ===
Located on Nelson Rd, this park was given to the City of Columbus in memory of David Nelson in 1911. It is approximately 30 acres and features athletic fields, basketball courts, greenway trail access, picnic space, a playground, a shelter space, and well lit walking trails and woods/wildlife areas.

=== Saunders Park ===
Located on Atcheson St, this park was formerly named Maryland Park, which opened in 1921. The first public swimming pool was built here in 1929 thanks to donations from The Columbus Dispatch. The park was dedicated to "Eddie" Saunders, a local African American radio personality, in 1989 and thusly renamed. The park is 14.5 acres and features athletic fields, baseball diamonds, basketball courts, picnic space, a playground, and swimming pools.

=== Sawyer Park ===
Located on Atcheson Street, this park features a community center for children and elderly for family friendly activities. It also features picnic space, tennis courts, and a walking trail.

== Area Commission ==
The Near East Area Commission was established in 1979 "to advocate for and serve the residents and citizens who live and work within the boundaries of the NEAC area."
