= Macon Hotel =

Historic building in Columbus, Ohio

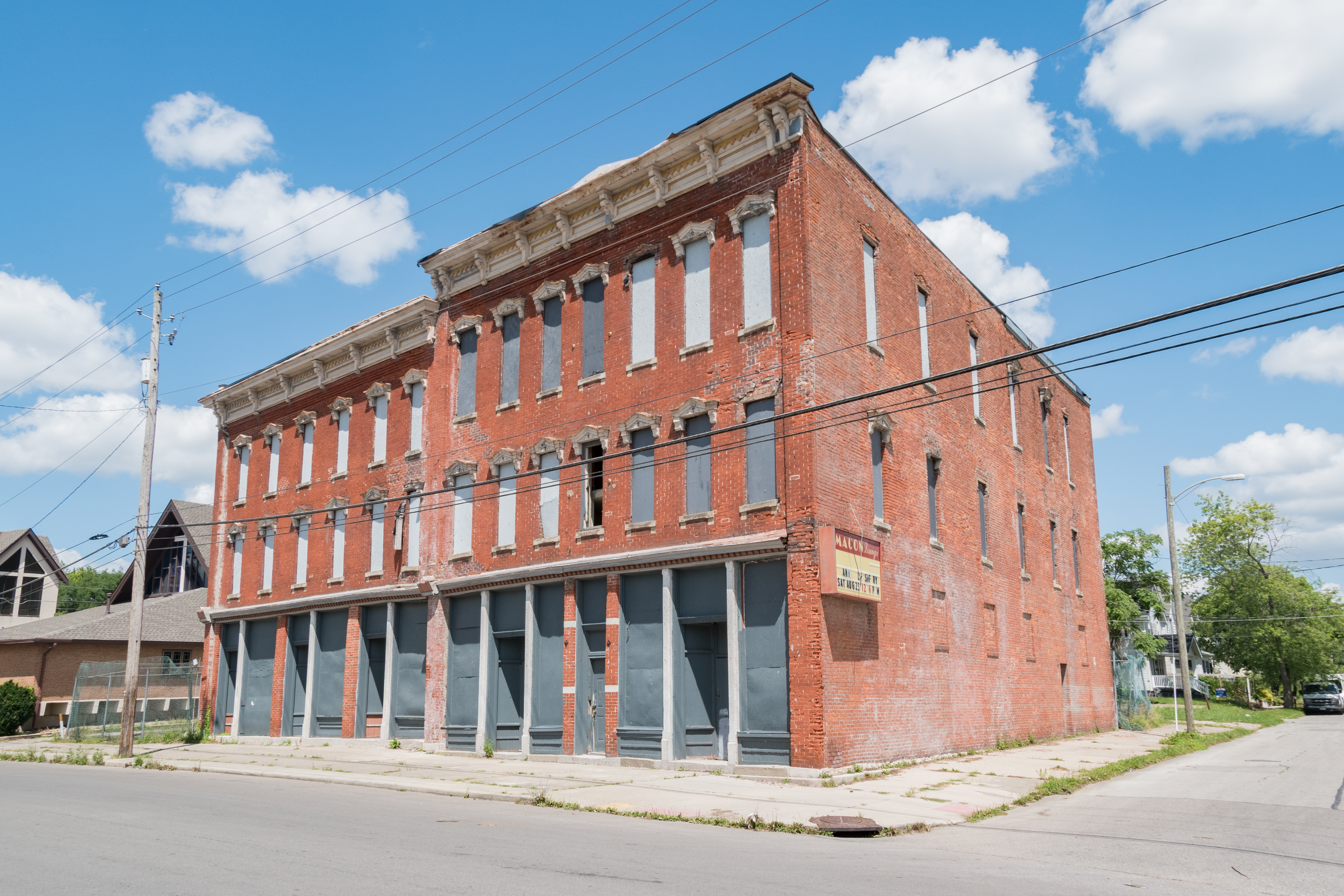
- Location: 366 N. 20th Street, Columbus, Ohio
- Coordinates: 39.973256°N 82.973058°W
- Built: 1888
- Original use: Hotel
- Current use: Vacant

Columbus Register of Historic Properties
- Designated: January 10, 1983
- Reference no.: CR-16

The Macon Hotel is a historic building in the Mount Vernon neighborhood of Columbus, Ohio. The hotel, completed in 1888, served noted jazz musicians in the 20th century. It was listed on the Columbus Register of Historic Properties in 1983.

The hotel building is one of four remaining properties in Columbus included in The Green Book, a historical guide to Black-friendly accommodations.

== Attributes ==
The building is made of brick, and has three stories and 4,930 square feet (458 m^{2}). It is a prominent example of iron frame and brick construction for commercial buildings of the era. The first floor contains an office, bar, kitchen, and three bathrooms. The upper two floors have been gutted.

== History ==
The Macon Hotel was built in 1888. The building became known for hosting prominent African American jazz performers and travelers during its hotel operation. The hotel was featured in The Green Book, a segregation-era guide to friendly lodging for African Americans. Twenty other Columbus properties were also included; only four of those remain.

The Macon hosted entertainers including Count Basie, Ella Fitzgerald, and the Columbus native Nancy Wilson. It later became a lounge and nightclub. It is currently vacant. The Macon was added to the Columbus Landmarks Foundation's "most endangered" list in 2015, 2016, 2018, and 2019, amid continued deterioration.

The building was resold in 2017 for $45,000, to a developer hoping to construct micro-apartments within.

In 2021, plans were announced to convert the building into an extended-stay hotel, with the first floor made into a restaurant and bar. The project would include seven units per upper floor, requiring interior renovations in addition to masonry repairs, painting, new windows, and a new roof.
