= Emerson Burkhart =

American artist

Emerson Burkhart (1905 – 1969) was an American artist based in Columbus, Ohio.

== Early life and education ==
Emerson Burkhart was born on a farm in Union Township near Kalida, Ohio in 1905. After attending Ohio Wesleyan University in Delaware, Ohio, Burkhart moved to Provincetown on Cape Cod, studying with artist Charles Hawthorne. By 1931, Burkhart moved to Columbus to teach at the Ohio School of Art. In 1939, he married Mary-Ann Martin, a famous model who would later become an artist herself. Mary-Ann was a model for several well known artists in New York including Edward Hopper, Yasuo Kuniyoshi, and Eugene Speicher.

== Career ==
From his house on Woodland Avenue, Burkhart quickly established himself to be a “Columbus Institution.” Burkhart became known for his portraits and street scenes of Columbus. It is estimated Burkhart painted 3,000 pieces during his 40-year-career, many of these portraits of Ohio residents whom he would pay a small fee. He even painted a portrait of famed writer Carl Sandburg, who was a friend of his.

In 1934, Emerson Burkhart received a commission from the WPA Federal Art Project for a mural over the auditorium at Central High School in Columbus. The Federal Art Project intended to give artists like Burkhart employment during the Great Depression and provide art for non-federal government buildings. Burkhart created a 13’ by 70’ mural, known as Music, featuring young women and men dancing and playing musical instruments. Just four years later, in 1938, the principal ordered that the mural be painted over as “it was too sexy.” Starting in 1999, over the course of six years, 1,000 art students from the Fort Hayes Metropolitan Education Center, under the supervision of art conservators, worked to remove the paint that once covered the mural. After its restoration, the mural was installed at Greater Columbus Convention Center.

In 1938, Burkhart received his second commission from the WPA for ten life size murals at Stillman Hall on the Ohio State University campus and he was paid $1,209 for 13 months of work. Each mural featured important historical figures like Walt Whitman and David Thoreau. Burkhart connected the content of his murals to the function of the building, which served as the social work building. In one mural titled Elizabethan Court Life, Burkhart contrasted the life of the wealthy privileged class with those of the working class. The murals are still located in the building today.

After the death of his wife in 1955, Burkhart traveled the world with the International School of America as an Artist-in-Residence. After several years of travel, Burkhart returned to Columbus and continued painting local residents and scenes. Burkhart died in his home in November 1969.
