= Franklin Park =

Franklin Park may refer to some places in the United States:

- Franklin Park, Boston, a large public park in Boston, Massachusetts
- Franklin Park (Columbus park), a park in Columbus, Ohio
- Franklin Park (Columbus, Ohio), a neighborhood in Columbus, Ohio
- Franklin Park Conservatory, a conservatory in Columbus, Ohio
- Franklin Park, Florida
- Franklin Park, Illinois
  - Franklin Park station
  - Belmont Avenue/Franklin Park station
- Franklin Park, Middlesex County, New Jersey
- Franklin Park, Trenton, New Jersey
- Franklin Park, New Jersey in Somerset County
- Franklin Park, Pennsylvania
- Franklin Park (race track), a defunct harness racing track in Saugus, Massachusetts
- Franklin Park, the original name of Franklin Square in Washington, D.C.
