= 10 E Broad / W Broad =

Bus line in Columbus, Ohio

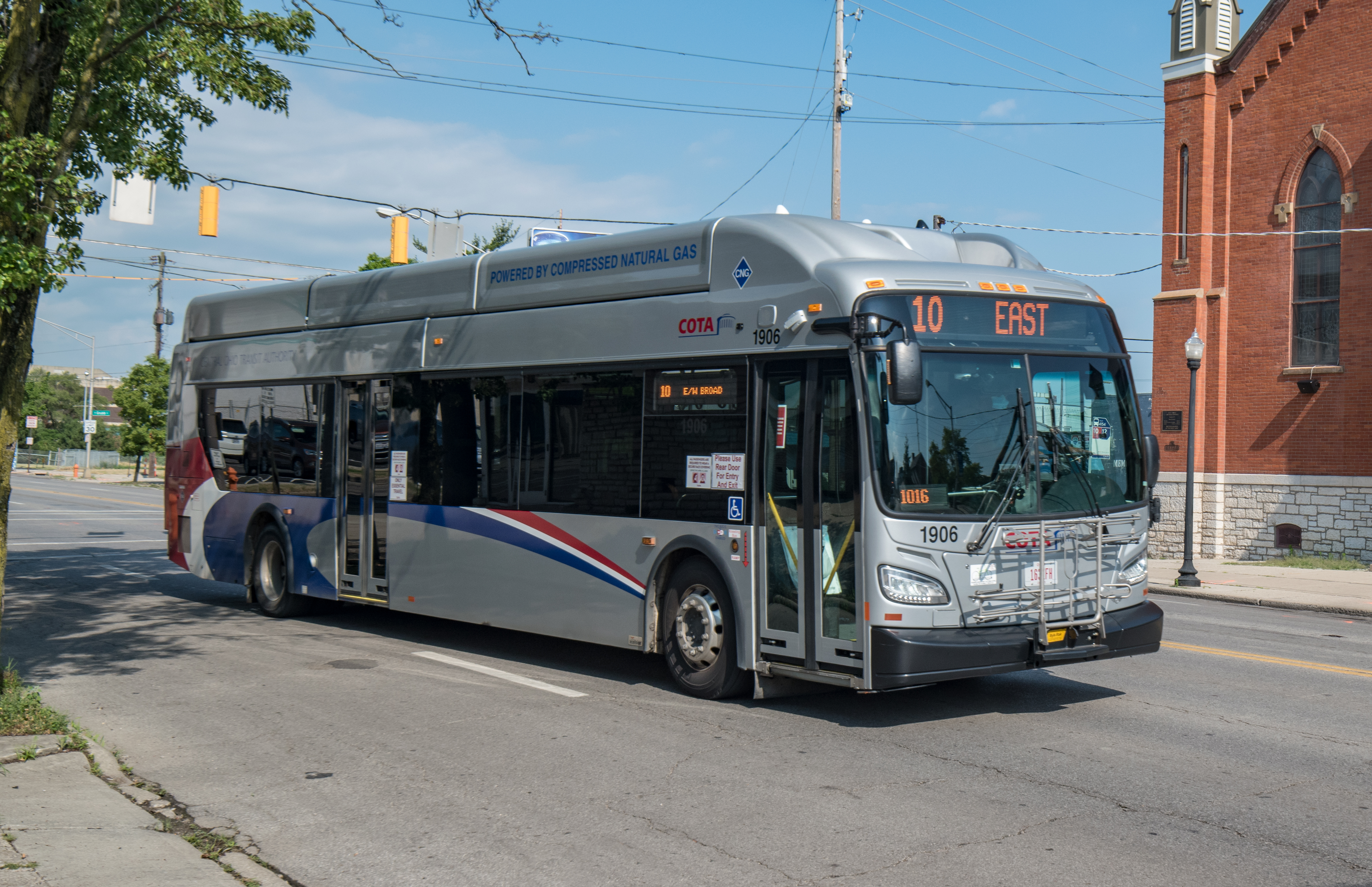
- A New Flyer XN40 on West Broad St. in 2020

Overview
- Operator: Central Ohio Transit Authority
- Vehicle: Gillig Low Floor and New Flyer XN40, CNG-fueled, 40-ft buses
- Status: In service

Route
- Route type: Frequent local service
- Locale: Columbus, Ohio
- Communities served: Prairie Township, the Hilltop, Franklinton, Downtown Columbus, Near East Side, Wolfe Park, Bexley, East Columbus, Whitehall, Reynoldsburg
- Start: Westwoods Blvd. (Prairie Township)
- Via: Broad St.
- End: Limited Pkwy. (Reynoldsburg)
- Length: 20.2 miles (32.5 km)

Service
- Frequency: 15 minutes or better
- Operates: 7 days per week
- Daily ridership: 4,777 (2025)
- Timetable: 10 E Broad/W Broad timetable
- Map: 10 E Broad/W Broad route map

The 10 E Broad / W Broad is a Central Ohio Transit Authority (COTA) bus service in Columbus, Ohio. The line operates on Broad Street, the city's main east-west thoroughfare.

The 10 replaced the West Broad Street streetcar line, an early streetcar line in Columbus, built by the Glenwood and Green Lawn Railroad Company in 1875. This line initially served West Broad Street with horsecars, and horse-drawn omnibuses followed a similar route. The horsecars were replaced with electric streetcars in 1890, and later with trolleybuses. In 1965, the trolleybus line was replaced with a bus line similar to the modern-day 10 E Broad / W Broad.

== Route and ridership ==
Route 10 traverses Prairie Township, the Hilltop, Franklinton, Downtown Columbus, Near East Side, Wolfe Park, Bexley, East Columbus, Whitehall, and Reynoldsburg. It is classified as a local line with frequent service (every 15 minutes or better).

The 10 starts at Westwoods Park & Ride, traveling north on Westwoods Boulevard for a short distance to West Broad Street. The route then travels east on West Broad Street to Broad & High, where at late-night times it travels north to Spring Street for the late-night lineup. At all hours, the bus proceeds east on East Broad Street through Columbus, Bexley, and Whitehall into Reynoldsburg, where it exits onto Limited Parkway at the L Brands office.

Landmarks and parks along the line include COSI, the National Veterans Memorial and Museum, the Discovery Bridge, the Scioto Mile (including Dorrian Green, Genoa Park, Battelle Riverfront Park, and the Scioto Mile Promenade), the Palace Theatre, the Ohio Statehouse, the Jubilee Museum, Franklin County Memorial Hall, the Washington Gladden Social Justice Park, the Columbus Museum of Art, the Main Library, Topiary Park, and Franklin Park and the Franklin Park Conservatory.

The 10 bus has the second-highest ridership in the transit system, only second to the No. 2 bus. The 10 West Broad bus was also the second-most popular as early as 1987, while the 10 East Broad route was the sixth most popular. In 1992, the year of AmeriFlora '92, the route was the system's busiest.

10 E Broad / W Broad route map

== History ==
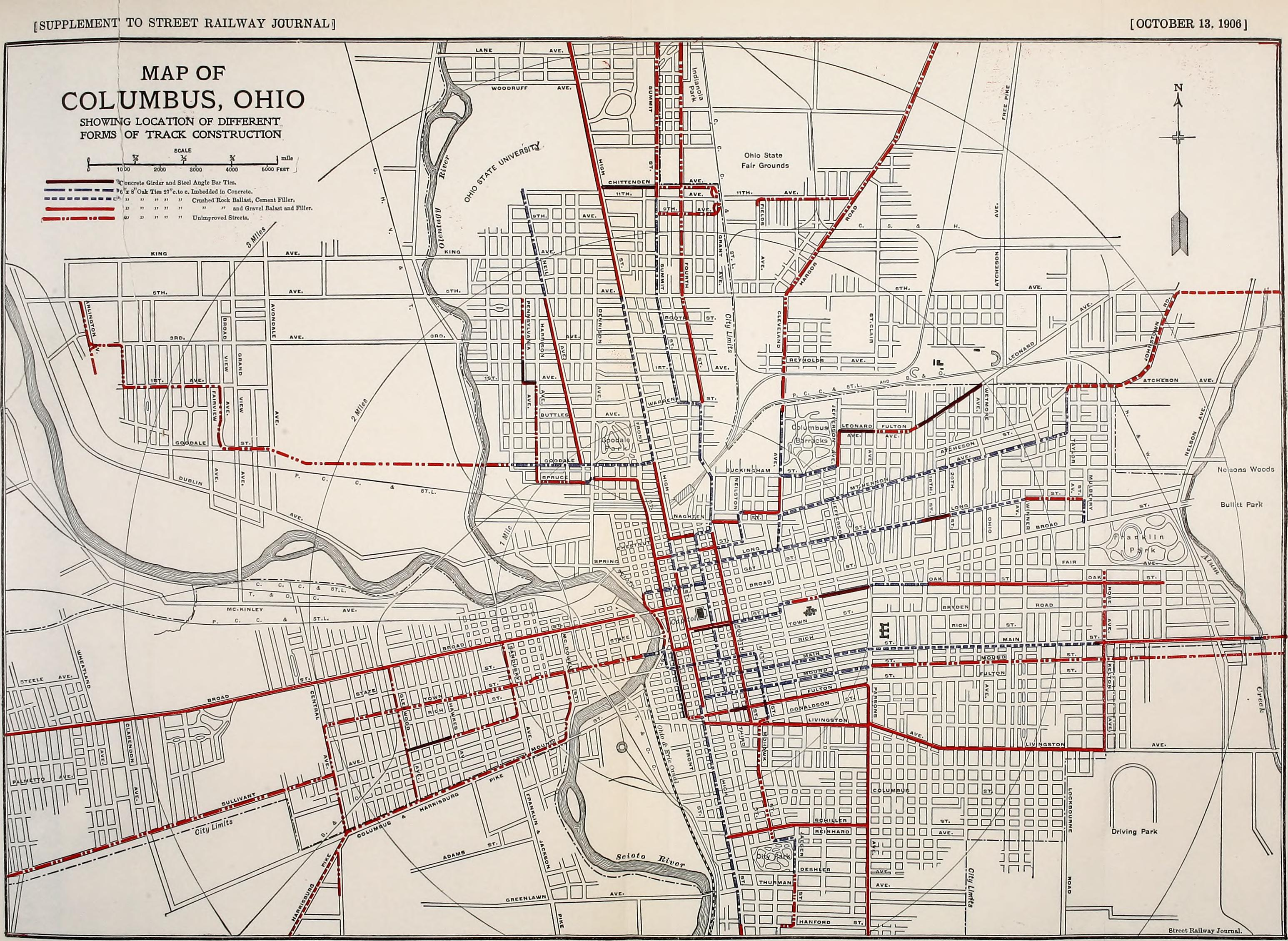
Streetcar lines in 1906, showing the West Broad Street line; streetcars never operated on East Broad

Broad Street has seen public transportation as early as 1860, with a horse-drawn omnibus route run by W. B. Hawkes & Co. The road subsequently was used for horsecars, streetcars, and trolleybuses operating only on West Broad Street (streetcars never operated on East Broad).

In 1875, the newly-formed Glenwood and Green Lawn Railroad Company built a horsecar line from High Street west on Broad to the city's western boundary, with a branch to Green Lawn Cemetery. That line was the first successfully electrified to utilize streetcars, completed in August 1890. The line was later converted to utilize trolleybuses. On January 4, 1965, buses replaced the West Broad trolleybuses, amid the Columbus Transit Company's conversion into 100 percent bus service.

In the 1980s, accessibility became an issue. COTA requested a waiver for a U.S. Department of Transportation regulation that required wheelchair lifts on all buses; COTA hoped the waiver would potentially save money. A 1981 ruling removed the requirement, giving transit authorities more flexibility. A transit accessibility advocacy organization opposed COTA's move. In 1982, a handicapped passenger moved from his wheelchair onto the steps of the bus, preventing the bus from moving in protest. In 1988, routes 10 and 2 were proposed for the first wheelchair lifts to allow handicapped passengers to ride. The first buses were equipped in 1991, and today all buses are wheelchair-accessible.

In 2019, COTA officials stated the 10 route may become the next bus rapid transit (BRT) line in the city, after the CMAX. The route 10 line could support bus-only lanes on West Broad Street, an improvement over the limited BRT features the CMAX offers. LinkUS, a COTA-Columbus-MORPC partnership, is evaluating the corridor the line operates on. LinkUS began the evaluation in 2020 as one of several highly-trafficked routes to investigate upgrading transit service on. The route received some federal funding in 2020, to be released around 2024. BRT was decided as the transit mode for the corridor in July 2021. Construction will be relatively fast as the route is straight and wide; it is aimed to start along with the northwest route by the end of the decade.

== See also ==
- List of COTA routes and services
- Public transit in Columbus, Ohio
