= Franklin Park (Columbus, Ohio) =

Neighborhood of Columbus, Ohio, United States

- Neighborhood of Columbus, Ohio
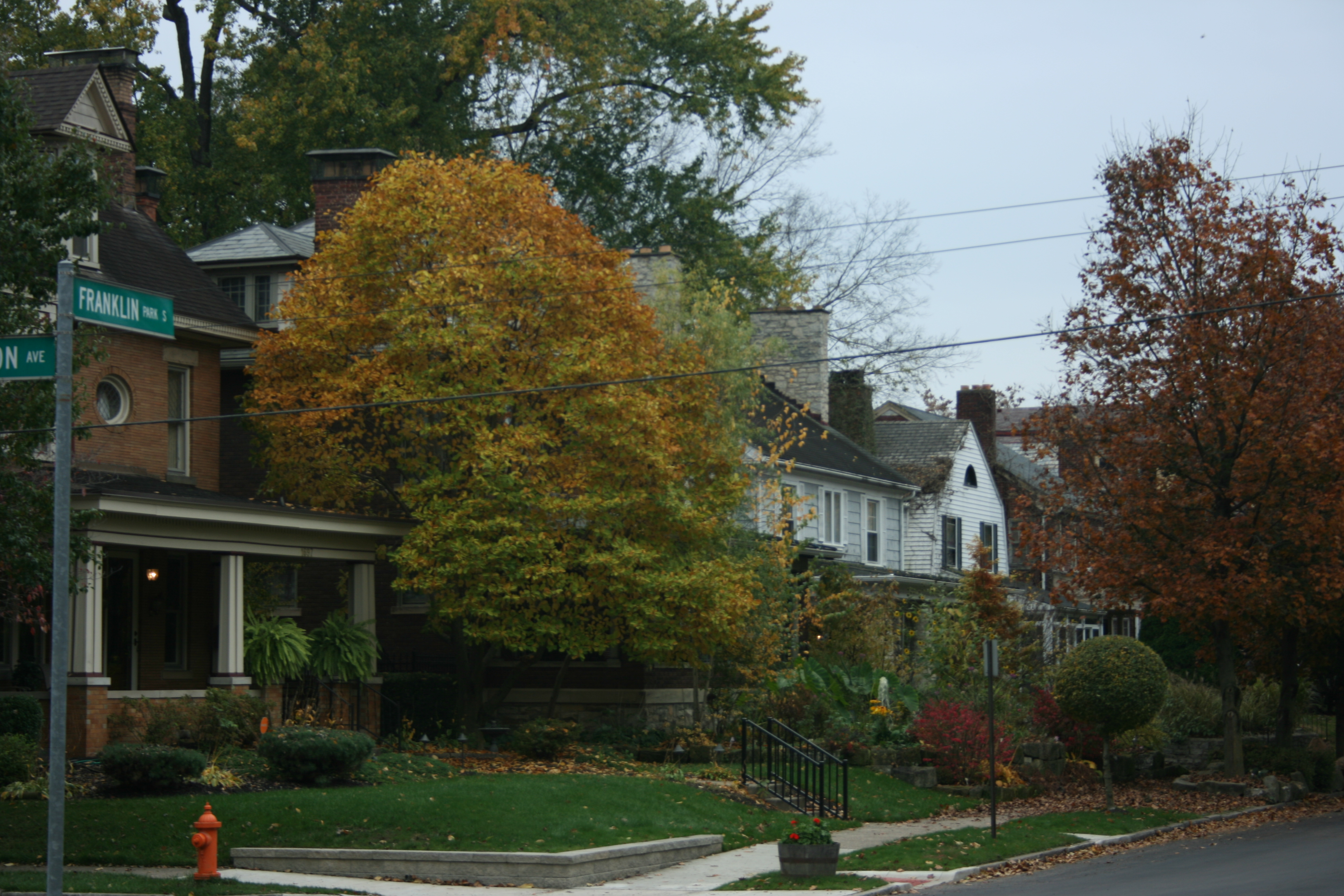
- Homes along Franklin Park South
- Interactive map of Franklin Park
- Coordinates: 39°57′49″N 82°57′36″W

Population (2010)
  - Total: 2,112
- Time zone: Eastern
- ZIP Code: 43205
- Area code: 614
- Website: Franklin Park Civic Association

Franklin Park is a neighborhood located on the Near East Side of Columbus, Ohio. Both the historic neighborhood and landmark, the Franklin Park Conservatory and Botanical Gardens, are named after the 88-acre park.

== History ==
This property atlas from 1899 shows the Franklin Park and Woodland Park areas. The grey overlays represent currently existing structures, and the coral overlays represent currently existing streets. The original area known as Franklin Park Place can be seen, as well as the non-extant racetrack within the park.

Development in Franklin Park began in the 1850s and continued through the 1880s. The neighborhood was home to the Franklin County Fairgrounds for 30 years before it became the recreational park that it is today.

The first known residential area of Columbus lies within the present day neighborhood. The small addition, consisting of three to six blocks, was referred to as "Franklin Park Place". The borders were Franklin Park South (known as Fair Ave) to the north, Bryden Road to the south, the train tracks to the east, and Fairwood Avenue to the west. As one can see from the source, the Franklin Park area consisted of many different subdivisions and additions whose names eventually merged as "Franklin Park."

The development of Franklin Park brought in both the working class and the wealthy. The neighborhood is a mix of both larger mansions and smaller, modest homes. The 1930s were a transitional zone between the fast-paced city life of downtown and the countryside beyond Alum Creek. Up to the 1940s, the streetcar became more common followed by people typically owning their own automobiles. As this became a popular commodity, people would take their Sunday drives on the 1.2 mile loop that circles Franklin park. Not only was Franklin Park a community neighborhood, but people would also come to Franklin Park to drive for leisure, race their automobiles, and picnic with their families.

== Geography ==
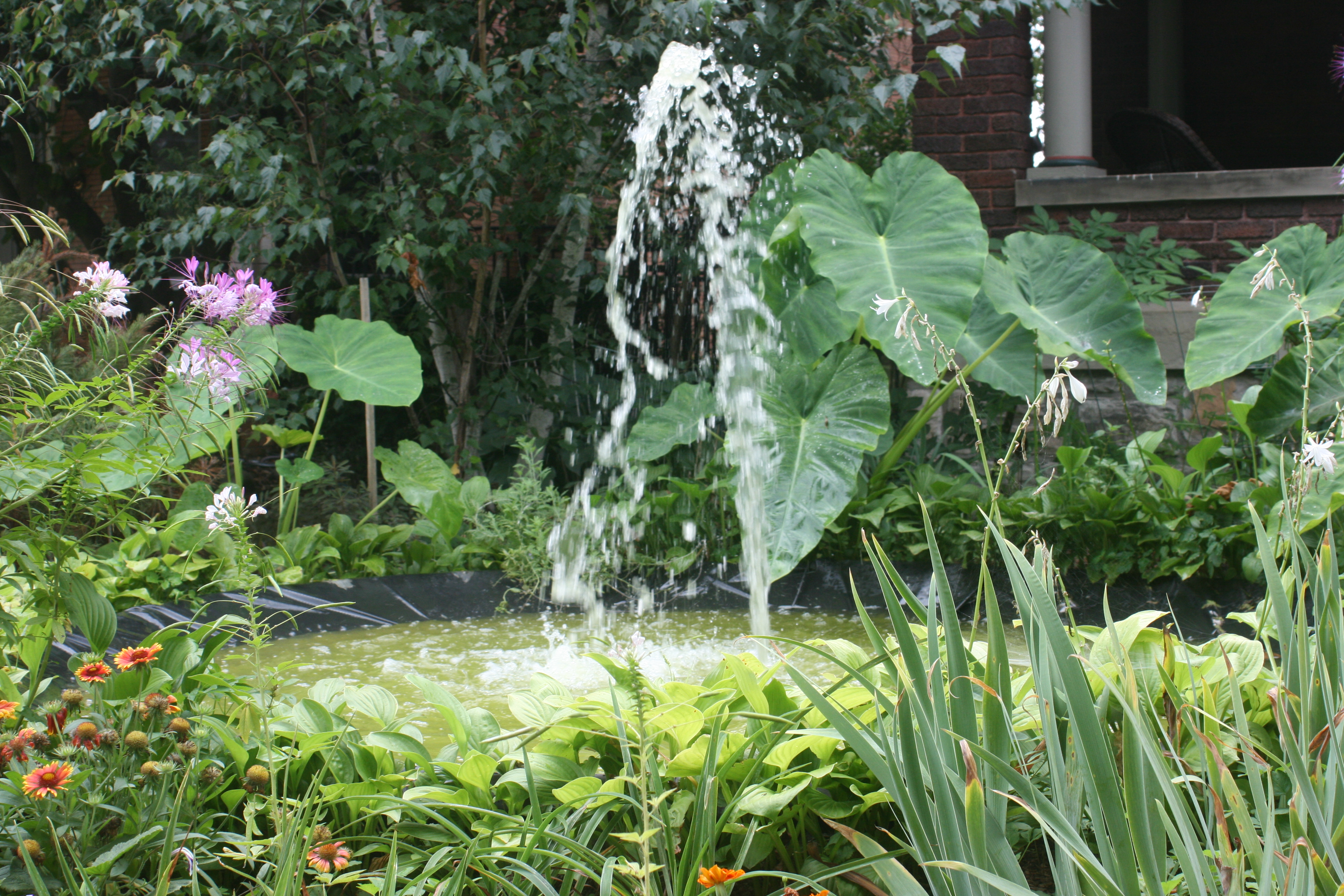
The influence of the park and conservatory in the neighborhood, as seen here in someone's front yard along Franklin Park South.

This neighborhood is bounded by East Broad Street to the north, East Main Street to the south, and Wilson Avenue to the west.

The Alum Creek tributary separates the Franklin Park neighborhood from the City of Bexley and the area originally known as the "Wolfe Addition to Franklin Park," which is known in modern times as the Wolfe Park neighborhood.

Franklin Park is surrounded on the north by the other Near East neighborhoods of Eastgate, Nelson Park, Woodland Park, Eastwood Heights, and Bronzeville/King-Lincoln. To the south are Hanford Village, Driving Park, and Old Oaks, which are both considered to be Columbus' Near South. Olde Towne East is another Near East Side neighborhood that is situated between the Discovery and Market Districts of downtown Columbus and the Franklin Park neighborhood. A Google Map shows the general location of the Neighborhoods of Columbus' Near East and Near South neighborhoods (without boundaries depicted).

The contemporary boundaries of Franklin Park have been disputed since the early 2000s and vary depending on the source. The general consensus would include the boundaries of Broad Street to the north, Main Street to the south, and Alum Creek to the east. The neighborhood's boundary to the west tends to be disputed with Olde Towne East. While some sources claim the boundary between the two neighborhoods to be Wilson Ave, other sources claim Olde Towne East follows a staggered boundary past Wilson Ave.

The Bryden Road Historic District bisects both Franklin Park and Olde Towne East. Franklin Park is primarily zoned residential. Franklin Park includes many single family homes, with duplexes, row-houses, and apartment buildings. There are small pockets of the neighborhood zoned for institutional and commercial uses. These occur primarily along E Main St and Kelton Ave. In addition, the far southeast corner of the neighborhood, known as the Holtzman-Main business corridor situated along the Alum Creek tributary, is completely zoned for industrial and commercial zones.

== Demographics ==
According to Onboard Informatics, the median age in Franklin Park is 34 years old and the median household income is $22,820. The largest portion of demographics in Franklin Park are single parents.

A good amount of Franklin Park's population are long-term residents, residing in Franklin Park for at least 5 years.

== Civic engagement ==
The Franklin Park Civic Association is the oldest organization in the Near East, with formal corporate representation for the Franklin Park neighborhood that is well-documented by articles of incorporation filed with office of the Ohio Secretary of State. Initially, the organization included boundaries that covered most of the territory that comprises the Near East Side.

On April 15, 1965, the Franklin Park Area Council (the neighborhood's earliest registered corporation) was recorded as a nonprofit corporation in the State of Ohio. The first president was Margaret E. Day, with Coleridge O. Jones Jr., and Napoleon A. Bell being the other corporation officers.

The second corporation was founded in 1974 as the Franklin Park Area Improvement Association, and in 1997 was renamed as the Franklin Park Area Association.

Ted Brown, Secretary of State, certified the formation of the Franklin Park Area Improvement Association as a community improvement corporation in the State of Ohio. The filings were submitted on February 28, 1974, by William H. Stewart (chairman) and Albert A. Copeland (Statutory Agent), with other trustees being Louise R. Jones, James C. Shivers, and Robert E. Short who met at 1885 Bryden Road to form the corporation.

At the September 25, 2012 meeting of the Association, the General Membership unanimously ratified a change of name to the Franklin Park Civic Association, Inc. Amended articles of incorporation were filed and recorded with the Ohio Secretary of State in April 2013.

=== Jingle Mingle (now known as the Mingle) ===
The Jingle Mingle was the annual holiday celebration of the Franklin Park Civic Association. Held in the John F. Wolfe Palm House of the Franklin Park Conservatory and Botanical Gardens, the 2012-2014 events were co-hosted with the Olde Town East Neighborhood Association (OTENA). Prior to 2017, the event has taken place in early December and has traditionally been a neighborhood holiday potluck. Although FPCA began using "The Jingle Mingle" term in 2012, the civic association has hosted an early December neighborhood gathering at the Franklin Park Conservatory for many years. During the renovations of the Conservatory to host Ameriflora '92, the holiday event was held at East High School. Since 2019, The Association has held the Jingle Mingle in early January, alleviating conflicts with the most hectic time of the holiday party season.

Since 2011, and now concurrent to the Jingle Mingle, the Franklin Park Civic Association conducts an annual Holiday Raffle and Silent Auction, which are fundraising events for the organization. The December 13, 2015 Jingle Mingle hosted a diverse group of approximately 160 guests from across all of the neighborhoods of Columbus' Near East Side. In addition to gathering to celebrate community and the holidays, drives for the needy are included. Since 2015, the "Socks Wear Out" drive has encouraged attendees to donate personal care items and toiletries, with a special focus to bring new packages of socks as the item most quickly worn out by the homeless.

In 2022, The Mingle was held on the Community Garden Campus in Franklin Park. Pictures and the program from this event can be found on the website of the Franklin Park Civic Association.

== Education and schools ==
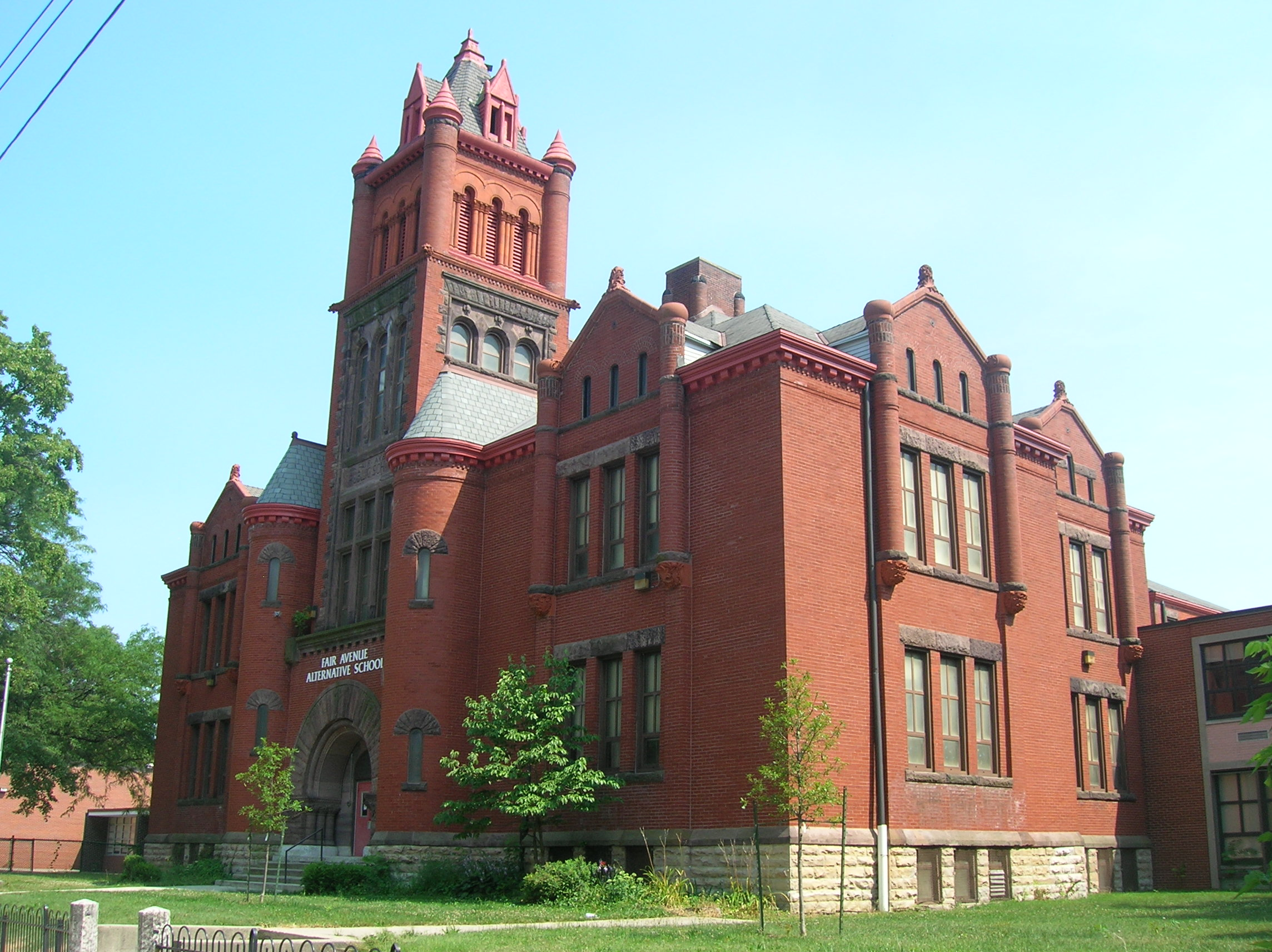
A+ Arts Academy

A+ Arts Academy is a private charter school which opened at 1395 Fair Avenue in the historic building previously known as Fair Avenue Alternative Elementary School and in the late 19th and early 20th century as Fair Avenue Public School.

Columbus City Preparatory School for Girls, formerly known as Franklin Alternative Junior High School as well as Franklin Junior High School, is located on a parcel sitting between Bryden Road and Oak Street with a present-day address of 1390 Bryden Road. Another building known previously as the Theresa Dowd School, as well as Franklin Junior High School, is also situated on the modern day address however, that building fronts Oak Street on the north. That building is currently used only as storage.

Historically, two notable Columbus Schools had original locations within what in the present day is known as the Franklin Park neighborhood. East High School was originally located on the site known in the present as 1390 Bryden Road. The original school was razed to build an earlier incarnation of Franklin Junior High School at 1390 Franklin Avenue. That building was razed to build the present day modernist structure (circa 1970) now ridiculed by many as out of character with the historic structures of the surrounding community.

The other notable school with early beginnings in the present day Franklin Park neighborhood is Columbus Academy. The school sat along the Alum Creek tributary at Franklin Park South and Nelson Road. The building was destroyed by fire in the early 1980s after opening at its new location in Gahanna, Ohio.

The neighborhood is currently in the East High School attendance area in the Columbus City Schools District.

== Recreation and parks ==
=== Franklin Park ===
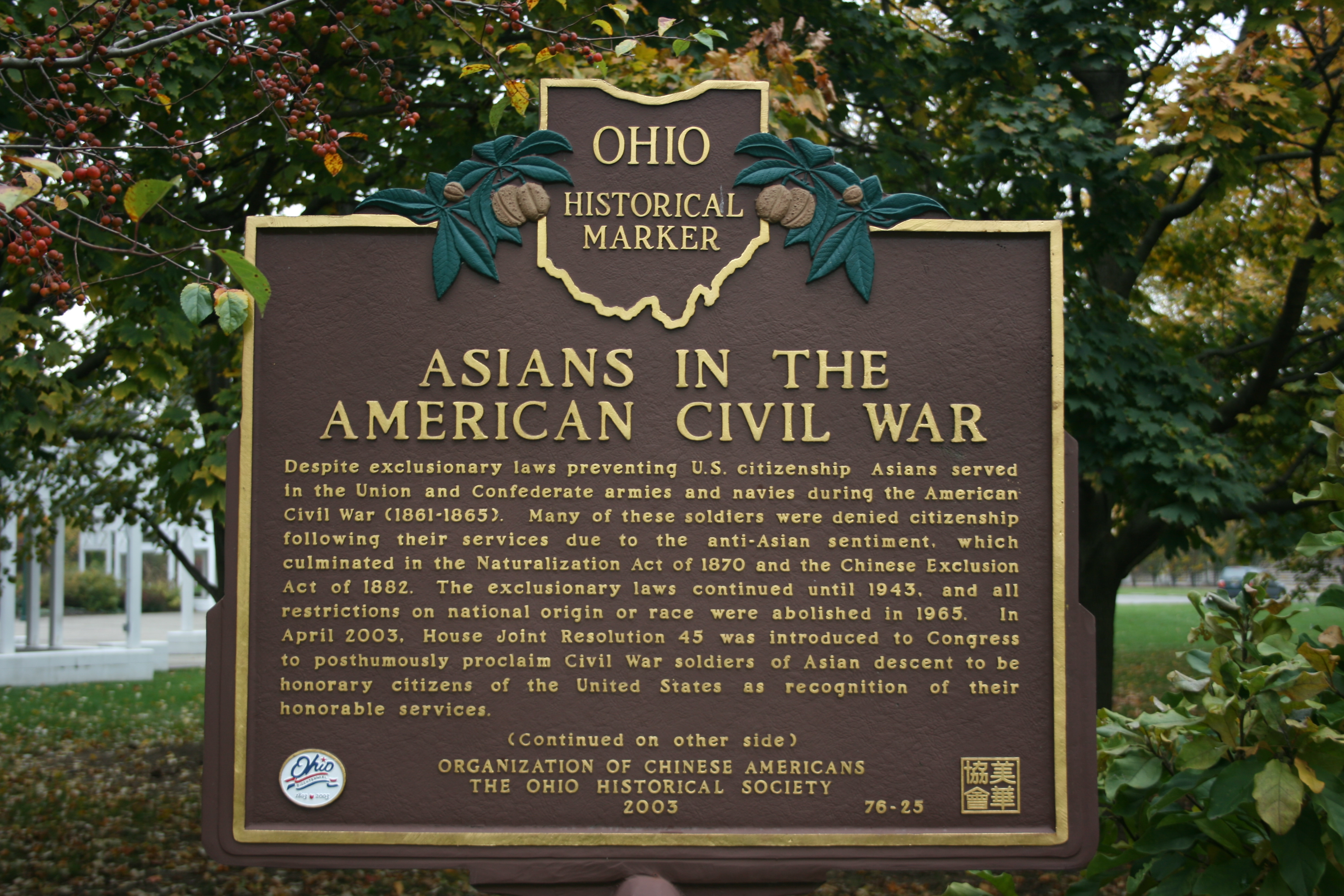
An Ohio historical marker near the Asian garden in Franklin Park, commemorating Asian-Americans serving in the Civil War.

Franklin Park is a landmark for both the neighborhood and the Near East Side. The park encompasses 88 acres filled with several ponds, an amphitheater, terraced waterfalls, a community garden, an Asian-themed garden, a picnic shelter, and playgrounds. The Franklin Park Conservatory and Botanical Gardens also lies within the park, a landmark of the neighborhood and the City of Columbus. Franklin Park is home to twenty one cherry trees gifted from Japan to represent Japanese community of Columbus, Ohio. Twenty of the trees are being kept inside the conservatory's greenhouse before being transplanted outside. The remaining older tree was planted along one of the lakes in Franklin Park on April 27, 2012. The occasion marked the 100 year anniversary of the original Japanese gift, thousands of cherry blossom trees sent from Tokyo to Washington, D.C. "Honda is one of the most-important employers in central Ohio, so there's a strong connection with Japan," said Bruce Harkey, a former Honda employee and the Franklin Park Conservatory's executive director.

=== Rainbow Park ===
The lot commonly known as "Rainbow Park" is located on the southeast corner of Oak Street and Kelton Avenue. The parcel (010-138164) is zoned R3, H35 (residential) and is private property. Prior to 2002, the property was owned by Columbus & Southern Ohio Electric Company. Recently, Connect Real Estate has started construction on a four-story building with 102 apartments and a rooftop deck on the lot, which will be the first built with Connect Housing Blocks, modular housing units assembled in a factory on Westerville Road. The building (proposed in 2018 as part of the company's Trolley District Development) was approved with a new design in July 2019. Groundbreaking was officially held in January 2024.

=== Playgrounds ===
Franklin Park and the Kwanzaa Playground at English Park.

== Religion ==
Franklin Park is home to a variety of churches, temples, and mosques. The following is a list of a few of the neighborhood's places of worship:

- Meredith Temple Church of God in Christ- on Chapel St.
- Gospel Lighthouse Church
- Hope Christian Church
- Muslim Community Center
- Love Zion Baptist Church.

== Settlement houses and social services ==
Nationwide Children's Hospital (formerly Columbus Children's Hospital) was established in the 1880s located at the Corner of Franklin Park West/Miller Avenue and Franklin Park South/Fair Avenue. The location is now the site of the Park Plaza apartments.

== Structures and landmarks ==
=== Franklin Park Conservatory and Botanical Gardens ===
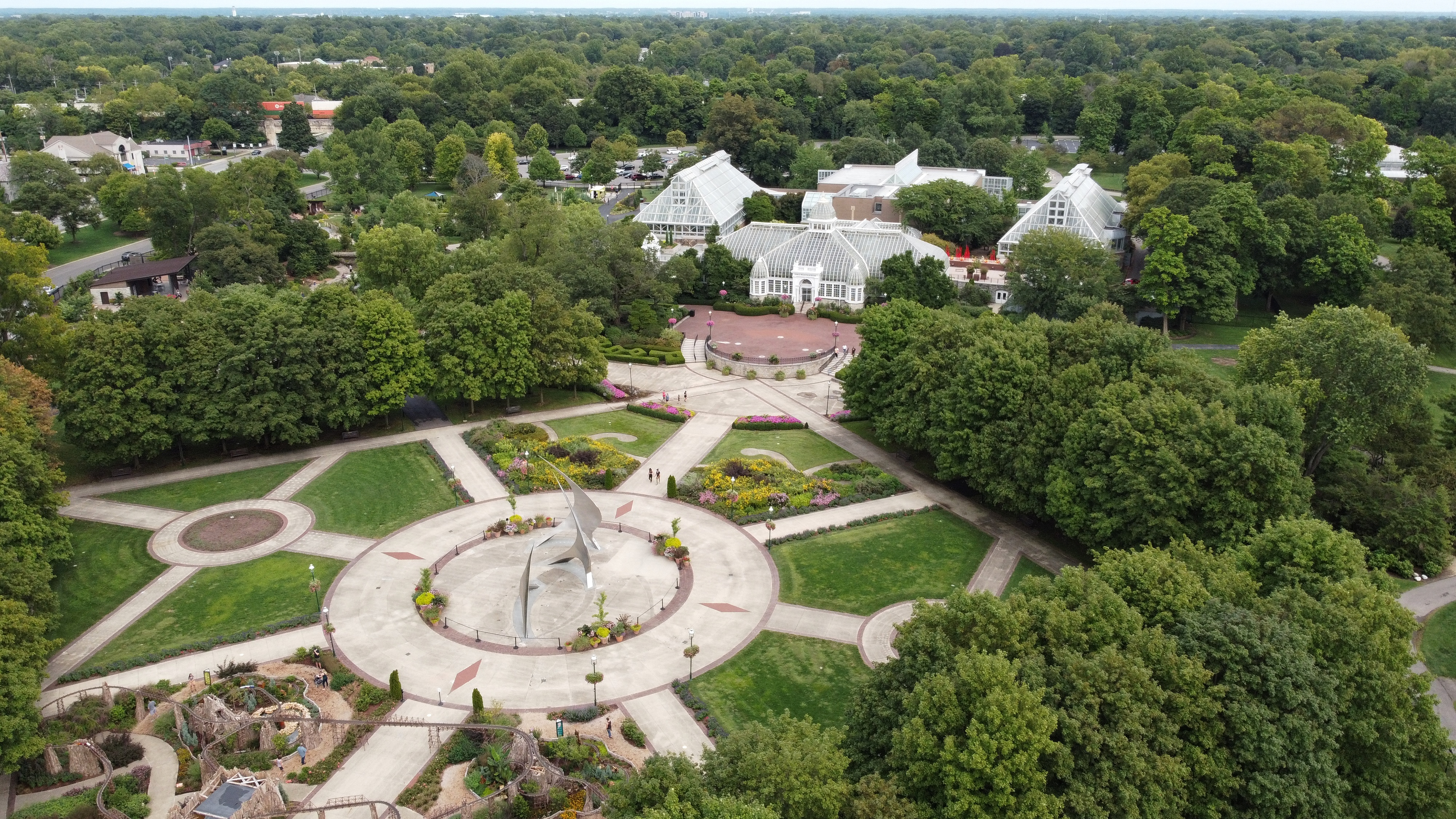
Franklin Park Conservatory greenhouses and grounds

The Franklin Park Conservatory and Botanical Gardens is a landmark structure on the National Register of Historic Places. It is situated on the 88-acre Franklin Park just two miles east of downtown Columbus. Built in 1895, the original conservatory stills stands after many expansions to the site. It is now called the John F. Wolfe Palm House, and houses 43 species of palms from around the world. The Fiddle-leaf Fig in the palm house is one of the oldest remaining plants in the conservatory. Architect J.M. Freese was inspired to build the Victorian greenhouse after the success of the Chicago World's Columbian Exposition of 1893. He drew inspiration from the City Beautiful movement and also from London's Crystal Palace, taking after its ornate, Victorian style.

In the 1930s, the Wolfe Family, better known as the owners of The Columbus Dispatch, bought exotic animals for the Columbus Zoo. The original site of the zoo was located in Clintonville, near the old Olentangy Park, which had its own zoo, both along the Olentangy River. Structures to hold these animals were not quite ready when the Wolfe Family had purchased the exotic animals, so they were temporarily held at the conservatory. To this day, on some of the windows of the Palm House, one can still see the remains of bars on the windows where the animals were once held.

Franklin Park and the Conservatory became the host site for AmeriFlora '92, a six-month international horticulture exposition. Renovation of the historic Palm House and a $14-million expansion began in 1989. The additions totaled 58,000 square feet and included expanded plant collections, classrooms, a library, gift shop, café, and administrative offices. After Ameriflora Ohio Legislature created the Franklin Park Conservatory Joint Recreation District to uphold management of the conservatory and surrounding acres by a new 10-member board of trustees and an executive director.

=== Trolley District ===
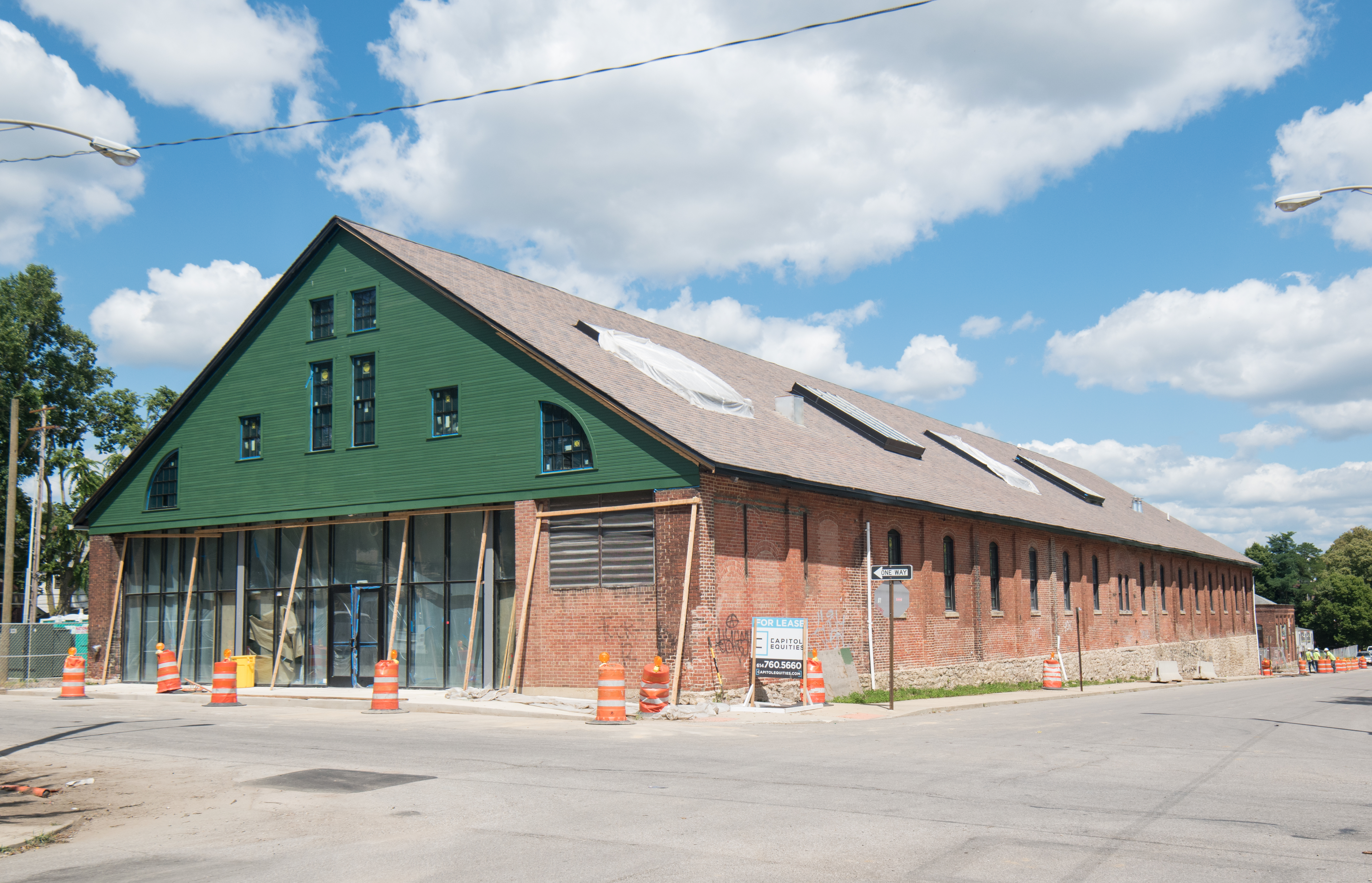
Former west car barn under renovation to hold the new East Market, 2021

The landmark complex of historic buildings making up the Trolley District are situated at the heart of the Franklin Park neighborhood on more than 3 acres. The site includes the East Market food hall and marketplace, as well as several bars and other planned businesses. The six brick buildings at the trolley-barn site were built between 1880 and 1920.

The landmark was purchased in 2014 by a developer with plans for a mixed use facility in the future preserving the historic structures of the complex). In 2014, the tracks from the maintenance shop to Oak Street still remained; however, they were removed by the owner of the property to safeguard their preservation.

=== Royal York Apartments ===
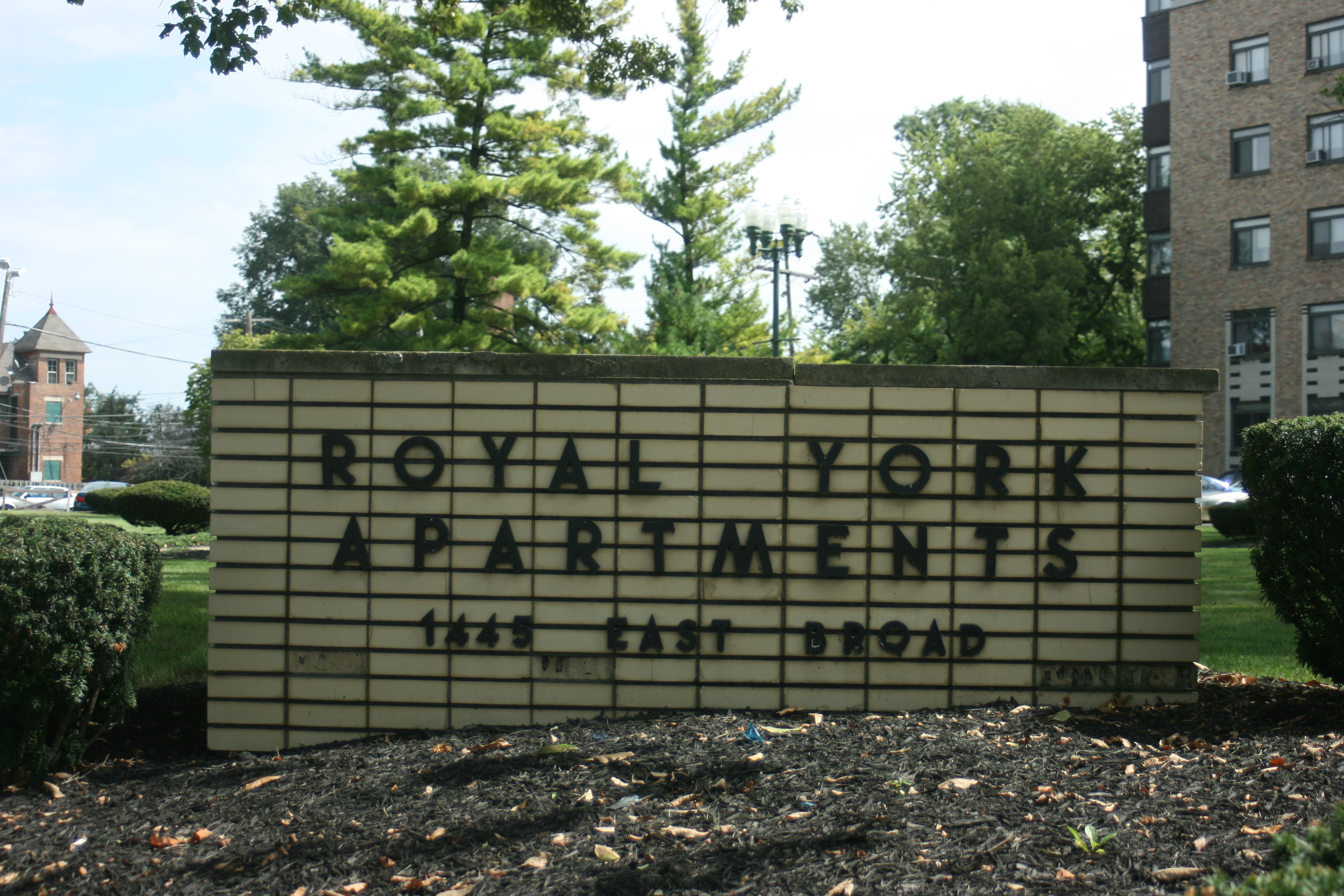
The sign for the modernist apartment complex, the Royal York Apartments.

The 1920s Art Deco style apartments were built in 1937 by architect Howard Dwight Smith who is well known for his designs of the Ohio Stadium. This eight story Modernist apartment building is the tallest building in the neighborhood.

== Entertainment ==
=== Asian Festival ===
Despite the low concentration of Asian residents, the Franklin Park area hosts several attractions tied to the culture of Asian countries and history of Asian-Americans. The neighborhood and park have been home to the annual 'Asian Festival' since 1995. The festival attracts over 100,000 people from around Columbus, the state of Ohio, and beyond.

=== Historic house tours ===
Although homes in the Franklin Park neighborhood had been included in the Olde Towne East Neighborhood Association (OTENA) Tour of Historic Homes before, in 2013, OTENA invited the Franklin Park Civic Association to endorse a showcase of their neighborhood by presenting the first Summer Tour of Historic Homes to feature homes exclusively located outside of their neighborhood. The entire tour was devoted to the homes fronting 88 acre Franklin Park and the Conservatory. The tour began on the grounds of the Franklin Park Conservatory in the Scotts Miracle-Gro Community Garden Campus, with the first stop being the recently restored "Caretaker's Cottage". In addition to serving as a neighborhood resource center and meeting space, the Caretaker's Cottage is home to the American Community Gardening Association. As followup to the Tour, it was revealed that the 2013 Tour of Historic Homes had been the most highly attended tour to date.

In 2018, the Olde Towne East Tour of Historic Homes returned to the Franklin Park neighborhood, this time going further into the neighborhood, unlike the 2013 Tour, which was devoted to homes that were directly across from Franklin Park.

All proceeds of the 2013 and 2018 OTENA Tour of Historic Homes went to the benefit of the Olde Towne East Neighborhood Association (OTENA).

== Transportation ==
Franklin Park was home of the Columbus Railway, Power and Light Co. in 1904. From 1888 to 1948, an experimental electric streetcar ran from Chittenden Avenue to the Fairgrounds that were once located in Franklin Park. This was the beginning of public transportation. In 2009, there was a proposed plan to bring a modern version of the Columbus Streetcar back.

Today, COTA (Central Ohio Transit Authority) operates three bus routes through the Franklin Park area. Route 2 runs along E Main St, Route 10 runs along E Broad St, and Route 11 runs along Bryden Rd.

The Alum Creek Multi-use Trail or The Ohio to Erie Trail is an important trail that runs through Franklin Park. This trail travels along one of the city's river corridors.

=== Notable people ===
- Davey Moore, featherweight champion boxer. Lived at 1683 Franklin Park South from 1961 until his death.
- Frank Packard, architect who built the Fair Avenue School on Fair Avenue, and lived on Franklin Park South

== See also ==
- Charles Frederick Myers house
- Near East Side
- Neighborhoods in Columbus, Ohio
