= Aurora Robson =

Canadian-American artist

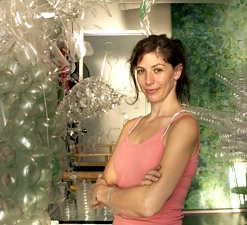
- Born: 1972 (age 53–54); Canada
- Education: Columbia University
- Known for: sculpture, installation, painting and collage

Aurora Robson is a Canadian-American artist who works in sculpture, installation, painting and collage, focusing on themes related to the environment.

== Early life and education ==
Born in Canada in 1972, Robson grew up in Hawaii and now resides in New York, Hudson Valley with her husband and two daughters. Robson attended Columbia University where she graduated with a B.A. in visual arts and art history.

== Work ==
Robson's primary focus is creating works made with plastic collected by intercepting the waste stream, repurposing plastic into art before it is sent to recycling. While her initial work was with common household plastics like water bottles and caps, she is currently focused on large scale sculptures made with industrial plastic. She also paints and creates 3-dimensional collages made with junk mail and excess packaging.

In 2008, Robson founded Project Vortex, a not-for-profit organization consisting of artists, designers and architects from around the world that also work with plastic. The organization strives to bring awareness to plastic pollution and encourage cleanups of waterways. In 2013, she gave a Ted talk at TedxPeachtree entitled "Trash+Love" introducing "Sculpture+Intercepting the Waste Stream," an open source course she designed to foster creative stewardship at academic institutions. The course was first taught by Robson at Mary Baldwin University in 2012. Her goal for the course is to inspire others to look at junk differently and rather than discard it, to create art.

Robson is the recipient of numerous grants, including the Pollock Krasner Grant from the Pollock-Krasner Foundation, a New York Foundation for the Arts Fellowship in Sculpture, a TED/Lincoln Re-Imagine Prize and a National Endowment for the Arts Art Work Grant.

Robson's work and philosophies have been included in WIRED UK, Art & Antiques, Scholastic Issues, BBC News The Forum, National Geographic ASPIRE Textbook, Houston Chronicle and other publications, programs and textbooks.

Some of her exhibitions include: "Plastic Fantastic" at Honolulu Museum of Art in Honolulu, HI, "Sacrifice + Bliss" at Franklin Park Conservatory & Botanical Gardens in Columbus, OH; "Stayin’ Alive" at the McColl Center for Art + Innovation in Charlotte, NC; "Everything, All At Once, Forever" at the Figge Art Museum in Davenport IA and "The Great Indoors" at the Rice Gallery in Houston, TX. In 2018, she opened "Gravity Schmavity" at Penn State Arboretum, PA

The sculpture "Dyno" is permanently installed at The Kingsbrae Garden in Saint Andrews, New Brunswick, Canada. It was made with broken plastic fish boxes. Her sculpture "Lift" is installed permanently in the Gibbs Recreation and Wellness Center at Rice University. "Lift" has solar-powered motors that help it rotate; it is made with 10,000 discarded plastic bottles and 3,000 bottle caps.
