= Franklin Park Conservatory =

Botanical garden in Columbus, Ohio

Franklin Park Conservatory and Botanical Gardens
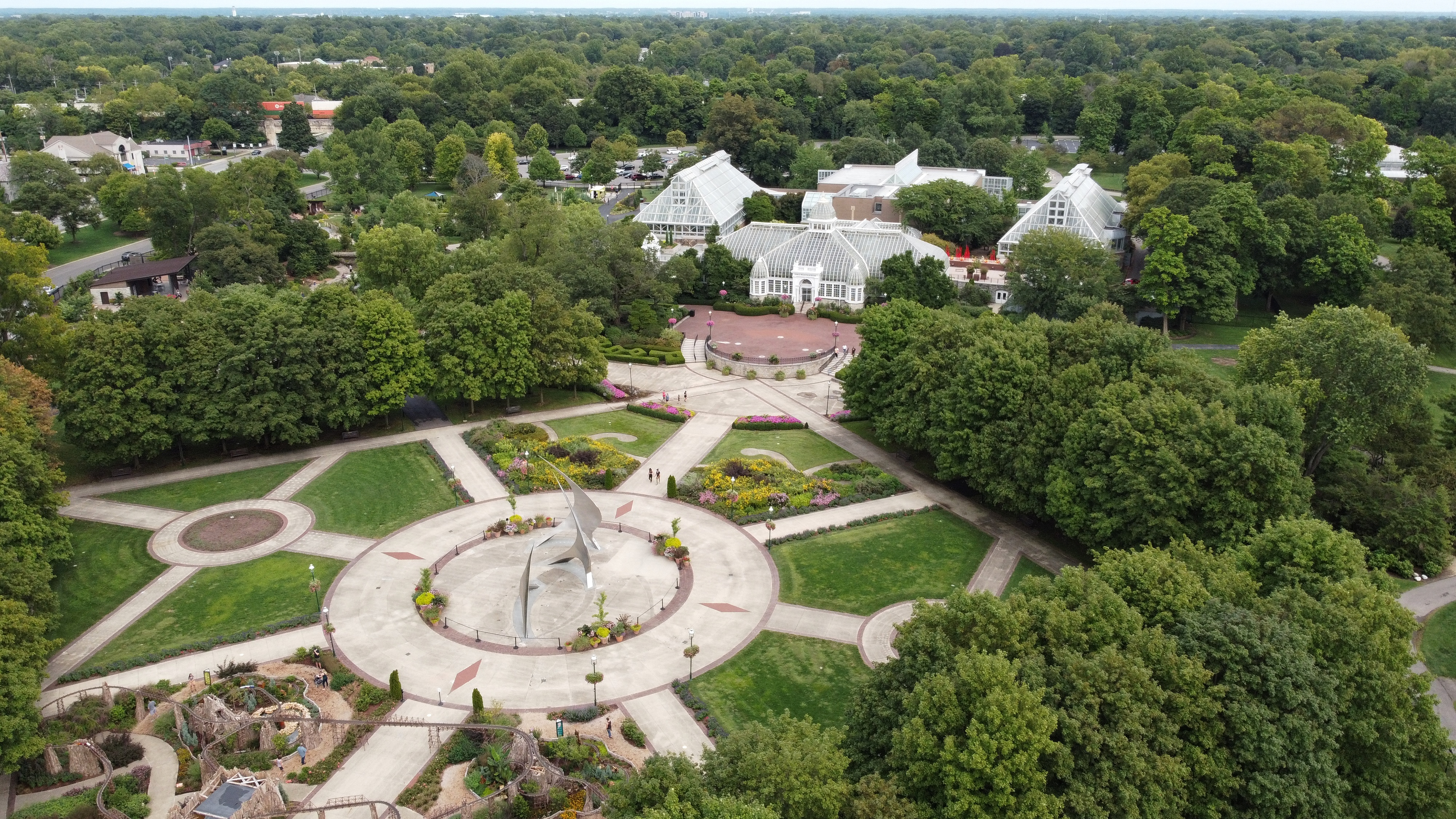
- Conservatory greenhouses and grounds
- Established: 1895; modern entity in 1992
- Location: 1777 E. Broad St., Columbus, Ohio
- Coordinates: 39.965859°N 82.952890°W
- Visitors: 353,399 (2018)
- President and CEO: Bruce Harkey
- Chairperson: Patrick Henthorne
- Architects: John M. Freese (original); Böhm-NBBJ (expansion)
- Public transit access: 10 CoGo
- Parking: Multiple lots
- Website: www.fpconservatory.org
- Franklin Park Conservatory
- U.S. National Register of Historic Places
- U.S. Historic district – Contributing property
- Interactive map highlighting the conservatory within Franklin Park
- Part of: Columbus Near East Side District
- NRHP reference No.: 74001489
- Added to NRHP: January 18, 1974

Franklin Park Conservatory and Botanical Gardens is a botanical garden and conservatory located in Columbus, Ohio. It is open daily and an admission fee is charged. Today, it is a horticultural and educational institution showcasing exotic plant collections, special exhibitions, and Dale Chihuly artworks.

The conservatory contains more than 400 plant species. Biomes representing global climate zones include: Himalayan Mountains, Tropical Rainforest, Desert, and Pacific Island Water Garden. Additional plant collections include a Bonsai Courtyard, Showhouse with seasonal displays, orchids and tropical bonsai collections, and Palm House with more than 40 species of palms. The conservatory is set within the Franklin Park neighborhood, and surrounded by Franklin Park, the 88-acre city park of the same name.

The conservatory was built in 1895 and was added to the National Register of Historic Places in 1974. It was added to the new Columbus Near East Side District in 1978.

== History ==
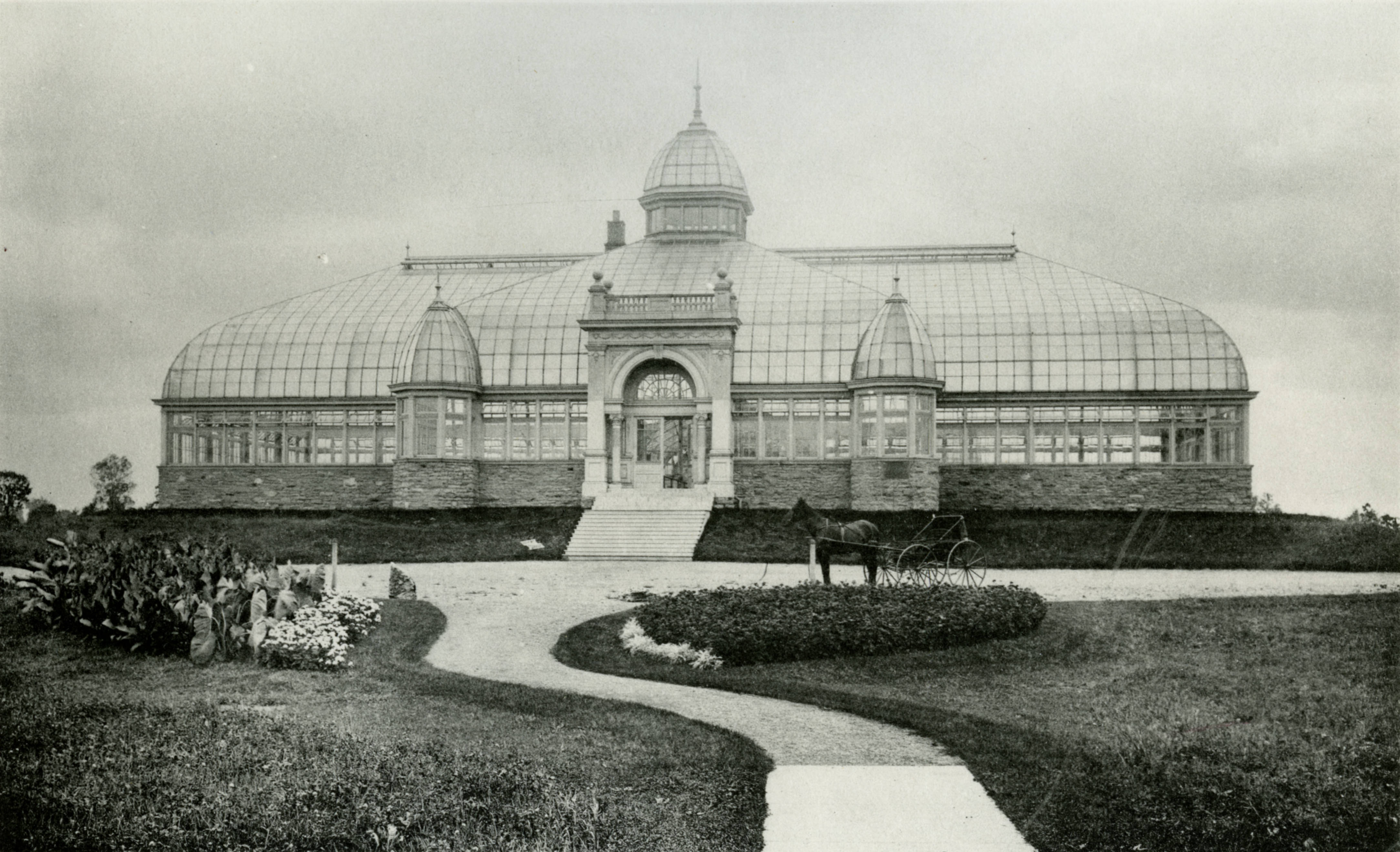
The palm court c. 1897

Franklin County Agriculture Society purchased 88 acres (360,000 m^{2}) of land two miles (3 km) east of downtown Columbus to host the first Franklin County Fair in 1852. By 1874, the Franklin County Agricultural Society agreed on the importance of this piece of land, increased the size to 93 acres (380,000 m^{2}), and made it the official site of the Ohio State Fair.

The state fair occupied the site until 1884, when it moved to a new location north of Columbus. With the change, the lot was abandoned. But on May 17, 1886, the site was officially revived when the Ohio State Legislature passed a resolution declaring it open for use as a public park.

In 1893, the Chicago's World Fair and Columbian Exposition was an immensely influential social and cultural event. It inspired the city of Columbus to create a horticulture building modeled after the Exposition's Glass Palace. This glass structure, built in the grand Victorian style, was erected in Franklin Park and opened to the public in 1895 as the Franklin Park Conservatory.

From 1895 to 1989, Columbus Recreation and Parks Department owned and operated the conservatory. Unfortunately, little is known about the conservatory's earliest days, as a fire in Columbus City Hall destroyed its records in 1921. Much of the conservatory's history has been documented from newspapers and personal written accounts.

For a short period starting in 1927, animals were kept in the lower rooms of the conservatory. In 1929, these animals left the conservatory and became part of the first Columbus Zoo and Aquarium.

Over time, the facility developed a reputation for horticultural excellence and the display of rare and unusual plants. The conservatory also became a popular location for family gatherings, weddings, and other events.

In 1974, in recognition of the conservatory's historic and architectural merit, the original glass structure, today known as the Palm House, was listed on the National Register of Historic Places.

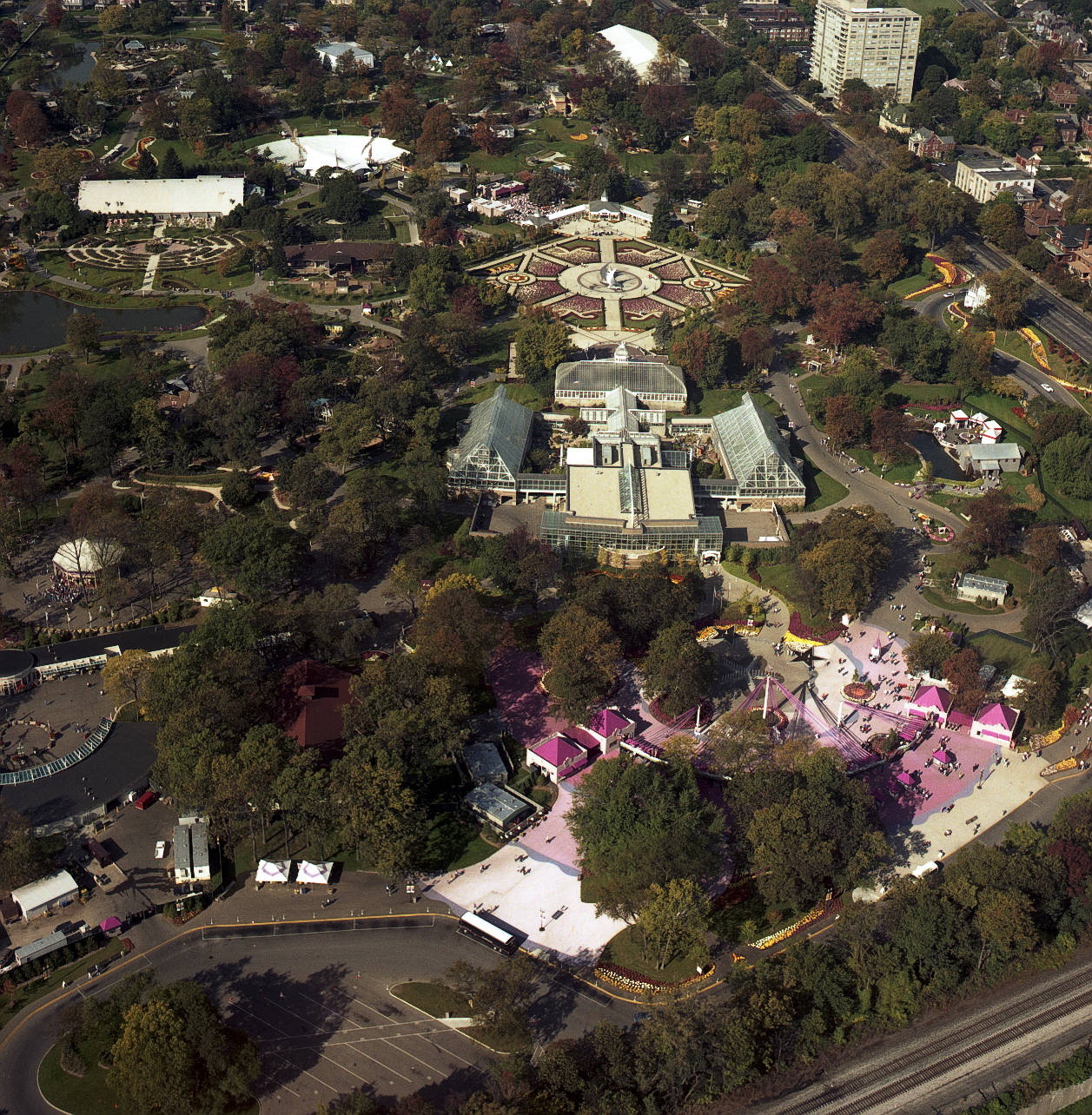
The conservatory and park during AmeriFlora '92

In 1992, Columbus hosted AmeriFlora '92 and chose Franklin Park and the conservatory as the host site for this six-month international horticulture exposition. Renovation of the historic Palm House and a $14 million expansion began in 1989. Additions to the conservatory totaled 58,000 square feet and included expanded plant collections, classrooms, a library, gift shop, café and administrative offices.

In the wake of AmeriFlora, Franklin Park Conservatory's future lay in question. Ohio Legislature created the Franklin Park Conservatory Joint Recreation District for the long-term management of the conservatory. Ownership of the conservatory and surrounding 28 acres was conferred to a new 10-member board of trustees and an executive director. With a handful of dedicated staff, volunteers, and an operating budget of $500,000, the institution began to regain its identity and momentum.

=== Present day ===
In 1994, Franklin Park Conservatory debuted Blooms & Butterflies, becoming the first conservatory in the nation to showcase a seasonal butterfly exhibition. It was an instant success. Since then, the annual exhibition features thousands of tropical butterflies flying through the Pacific Island Water Garden. It attracts thousands of visitors each year, and other conservatories throughout the nation have followed suit.

The years 2003 and 2004 brought new milestones when Franklin Park Conservatory presented Chihuly at the Conservatory, an exhibition that increased attendance by 182 percent. On October 29, 2004, the Friends of the Conservatory, a private, nonprofit group that supports the conservatory's programming, purchased nearly the entire exhibition of Dale Chihuly's artworks valued at close to $7 million. Franklin Park Conservatory is the only public botanical garden in the world to own a signature collection of Chihuly's glass artworks, which represents over 3,000 pieces of glass.

Several exhibitions that merge nature and art have followed. Chapungu: Stories in Stone was a collection stone sculptures by self-taught artists from Zimbabwe, Branching Out featured the work of Patrick Daugherty, and imaginative garden railroads by Paul Busse in Enchanted Express. Contemporary artists including Dennis Oppenheim, Laura Stein, and Andy Goldsworthy came together in the exhibition Bending Nature. Glass artist Debra Moore's orchids were displayed in 2011, and sculpture by Aurora Robson debuted at the conservatory in 2012.

In the fall of 2013, the conservatory hosted an exhibition by internationally recognized British artist Bruce Munro. Light at Franklin Park Conservatory featured 10 large-scale light installations and gallery works.

In 2002, the conservatory undertook the first phase of a comprehensive master plan and raised $23 million to support new construction projects. New gardens, event venues and additions to the Palm House were dedicated in 2008, and contemporary light artist James Turrell was commissioned to illuminate the Palm House with a permanent installation. In September 2009, the conservatory converted four acres of Franklin Park into the four-acre ScottsMiracle-Gro Community Garden Campus. Implementation of the first phase of the master plan ended in 2011 with the completion of a 9,200 sq. ft. support greenhouse.

The facility offers a wide range of educational classes for school groups, families, and individuals of all ages. Its extensive plant collections and special exhibitions provide hands-on learning opportunities about the natural world, gardening, and the arts.

== Gallery ==
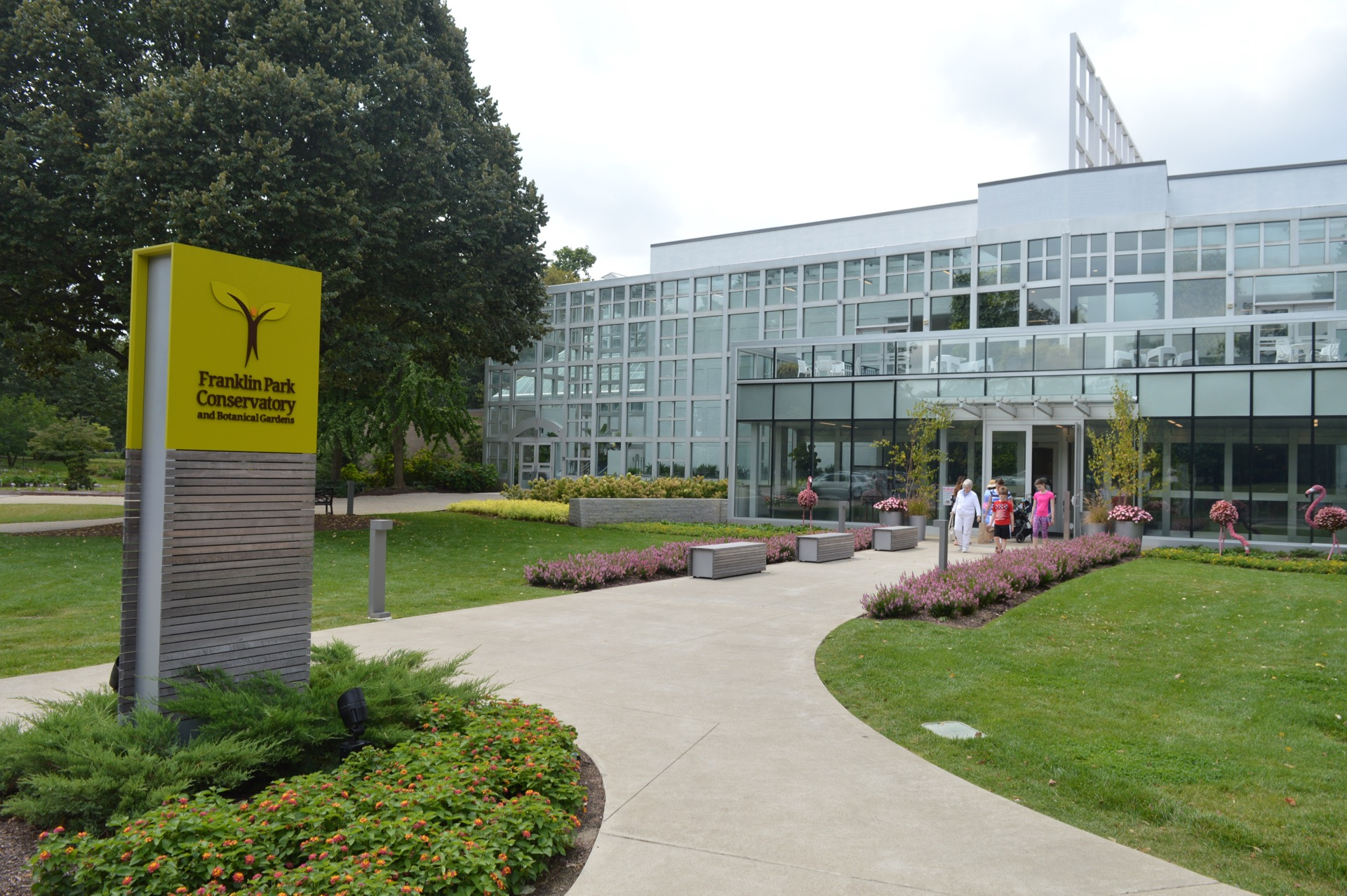
Main entrance

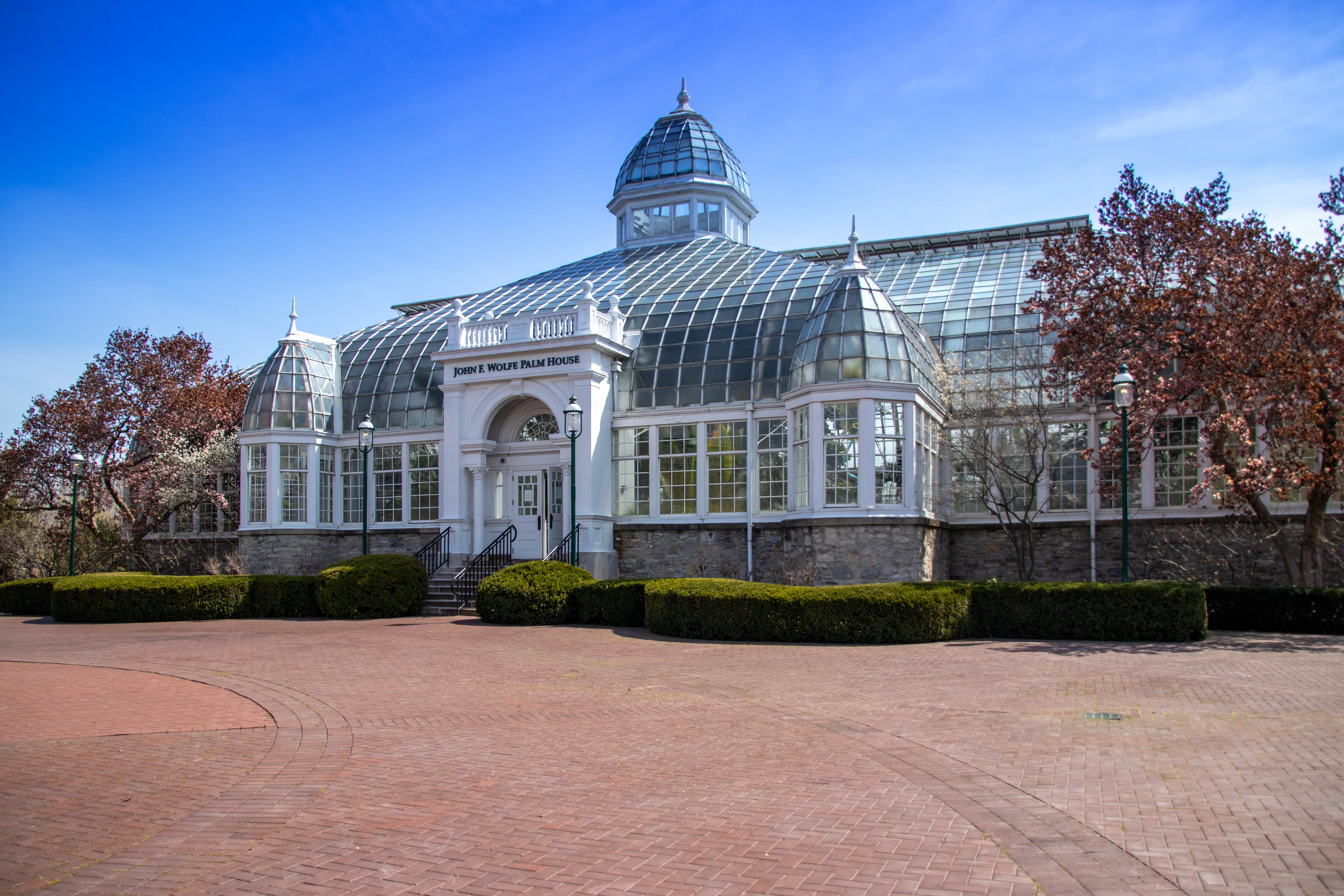
John F. Wolfe Palm House

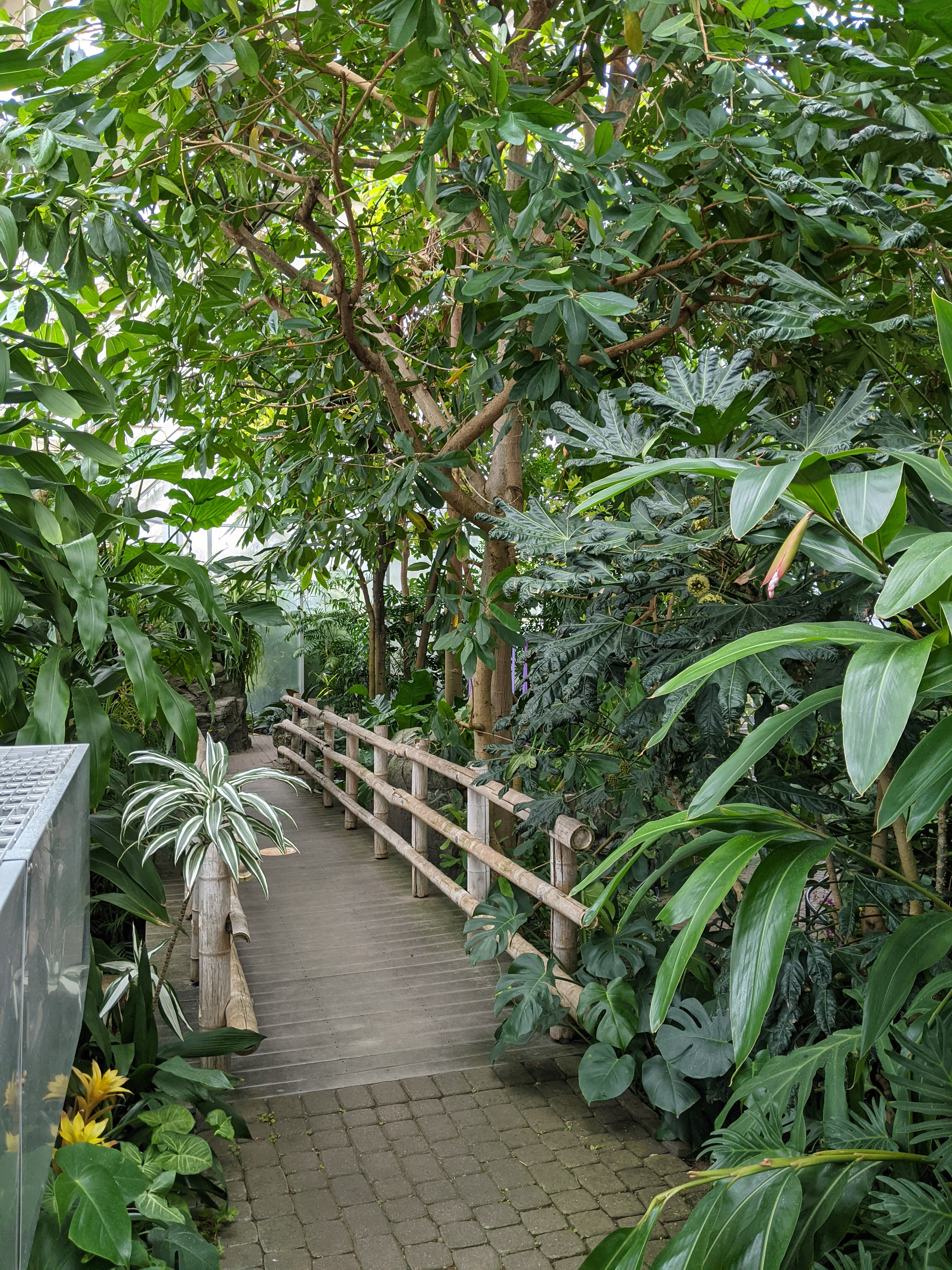
Rainforest biome

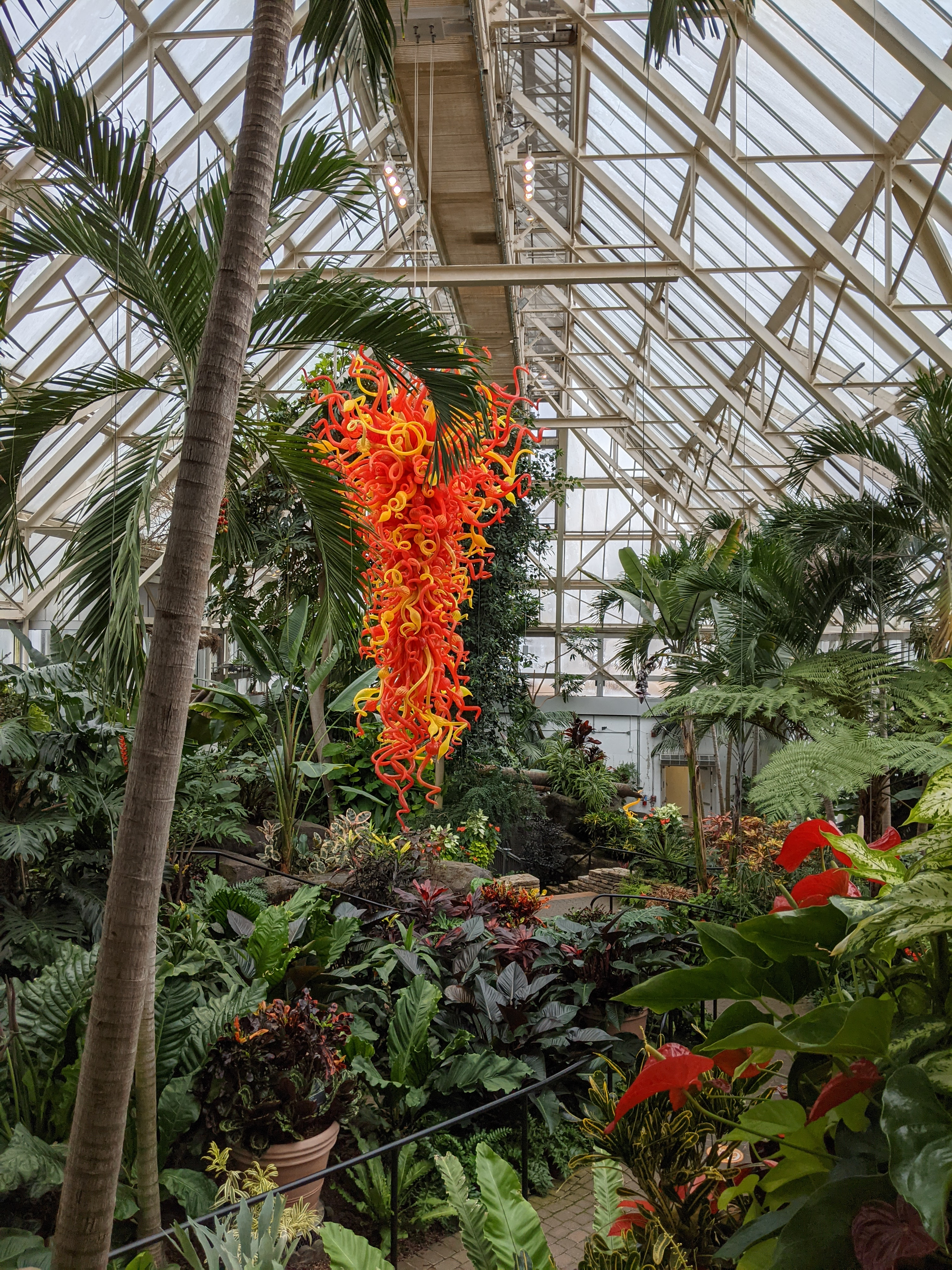
Pacific Island Water Garden

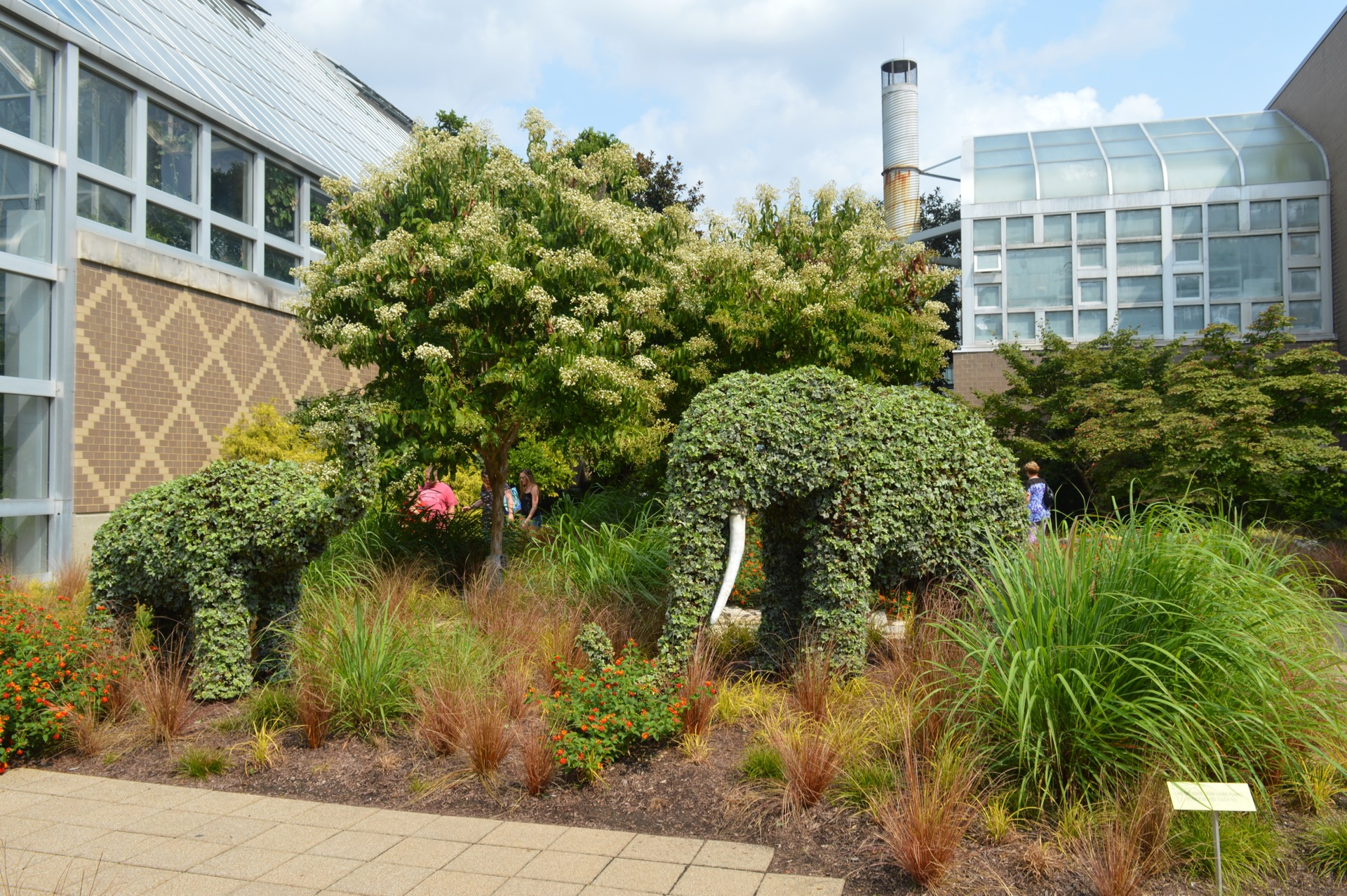
Outdoor topiaries

== See also ==
- List of botanical gardens and arboretums in the United States
- National Register of Historic Places listings in Columbus, Ohio
