= East Columbus (Ohio) =

Settlement in Columbus, Ohio, USA

Coordinates: 39°59′06″N 82°55′40″W

Interactive map of the neighborhood

East Columbus (East Side) is a very large area in Columbus, Ohio. It can be defined as the area bounded by Interstate 70, Interstate 670, and the eastern city limits that stretch miles outside the city outerbelt (Interstate 270). Generally, the East Side is separate from the Near East Side (Near East Side, Columbus, Ohio), with the Near East Side being the area closer to Downtown Columbus.

== Suburbs ==
East Columbus is home to the Columbus suburbs, Bexley, Whitehall, Brice, and Reynoldsburg.

== Demographics ==
East Columbus has an estimated population of 6,360.

== John Glenn Columbus International Airport ==
The East Side is perhaps most visited because of its airport. The East Side contains John Glenn Columbus International Airport (CMH), the largest airport in the Columbus Metropolitan Area.

== Food access ==
The East Side has few major commercial grocery stores. Food insecurity is high for the large area, rated as one of five zip codes with very low food security in Columbus.
