= Franklin Park (Columbus park) =

Park in Columbus, Ohio, U.S.

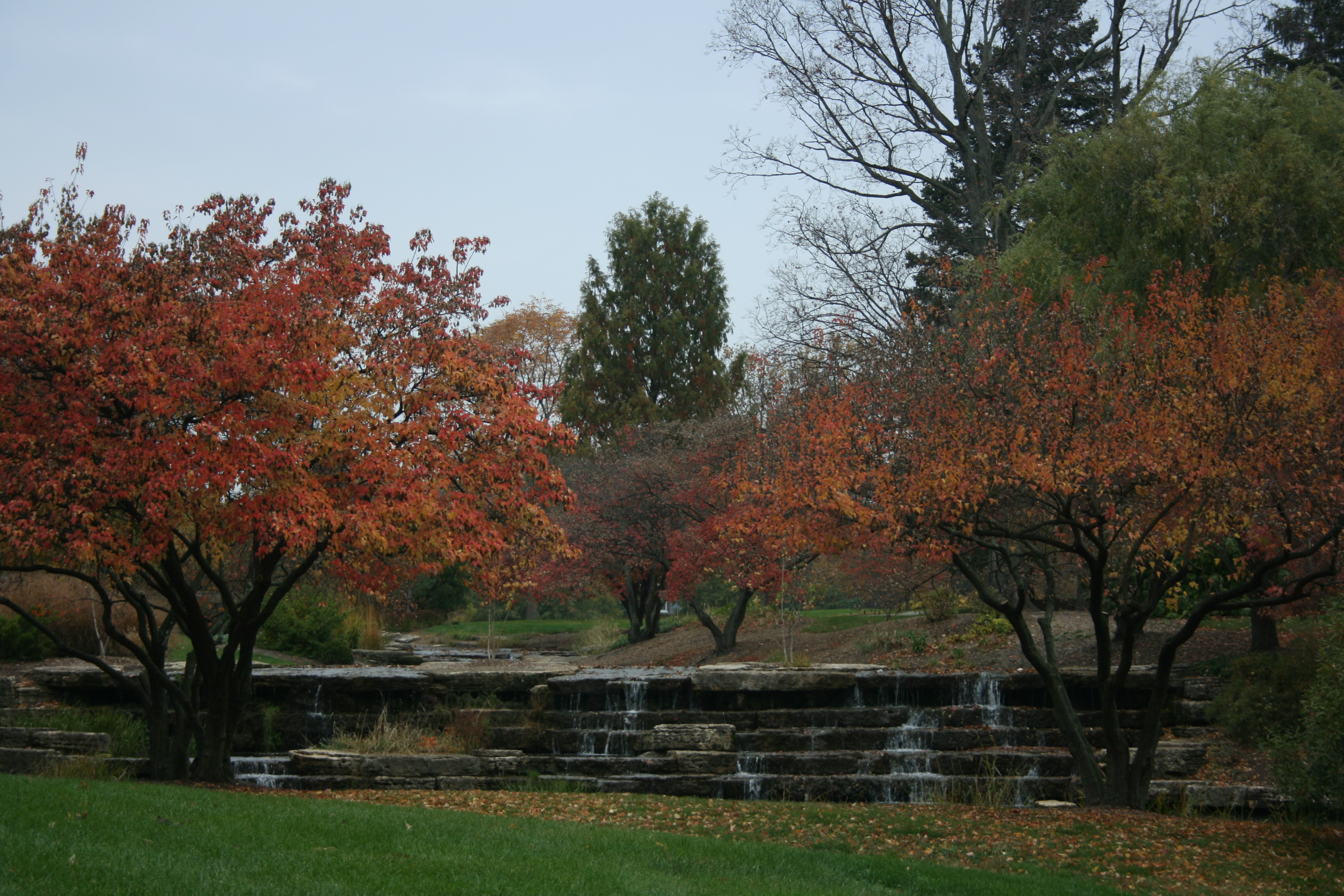
- Waterfalls at the park
- Interactive map of Franklin Park
- Coordinates: 39°57′54″N 82°57′18″W
- Area: 88 acres (36 ha)
- Administrator: Columbus Recreation and Parks Department
- Public transit: 10; CoGo
- Website: Official website

Franklin Park is a public park in Columbus, Ohio, United States. It gave its name to the Columbus neighborhood in which it is contained, Franklin Park.

== Description ==
The park is a landmark for both the neighborhood and the Near East Side. The park encompasses 88 acres (36 ha) filled with several ponds, an amphitheater, terraced waterfalls, a community garden, an Asian-themed garden, a picnic shelter, and playgrounds. The Franklin Park Conservatory and Botanical Gardens also lie within the park, a landmark of the neighborhood and the City of Columbus. Franklin Park is home to twenty one cherry trees gifted from Japan to represent Japanese community of Columbus, Ohio. Twenty of the trees are being kept inside the conservatory's greenhouse before being transplanted outside. The remaining older tree was planted along one of the lakes in Franklin Park on April 27, 2012. The occasion marked the 100 year anniversary of the original Japanese gift, thousands of cherry blossom trees sent from Tokyo to Washington, D.C. "Honda is one of the most-important employers in central Ohio, so there's a strong connection with Japan," said Bruce Harkey, a former Honda employee and the Franklin Park Conservatory's executive director.

== History ==
The park's origins date to 1851, when the Franklin County Agricultural Society organized and purchased eight acres here. From 1874 to 1885, the land was used to host the Ohio State Fair.

The Franklin Park Cascades is a water feature of ponds and waterfalls, constructed in 1991 for Ameriflora '92. The system was renovated in the mid-2010s for about $500,000, though a $2.2 million project in 2019 fully fixed the cascades and made the surrounding area resemble a more natural forest setting.

== Gallery ==
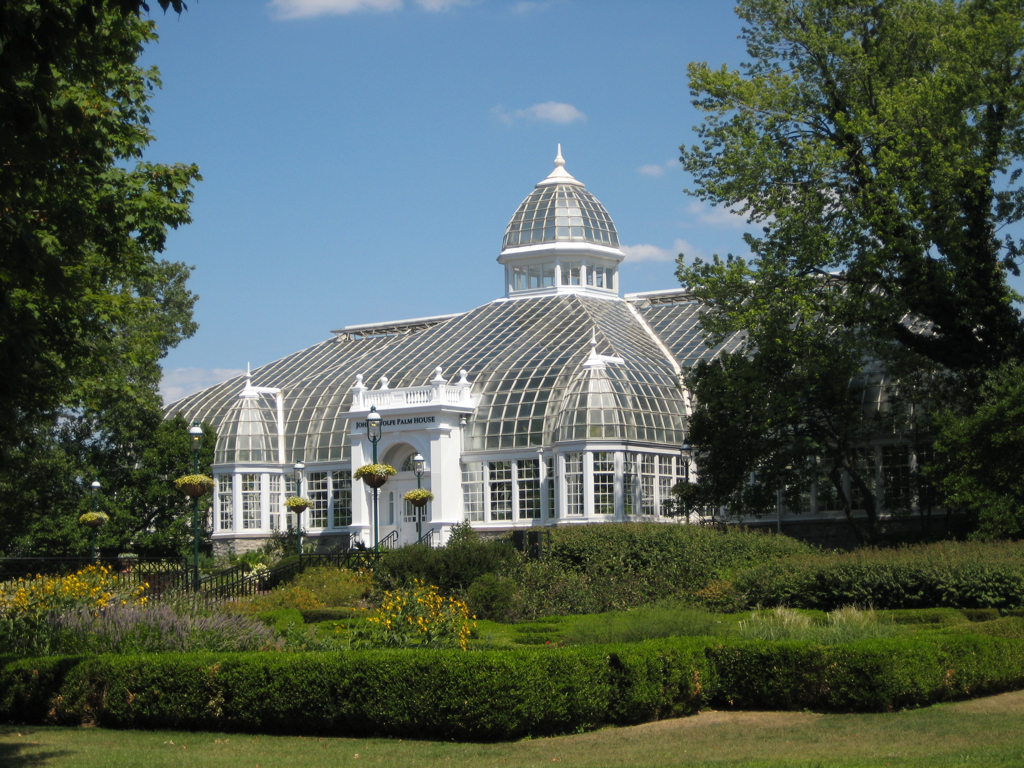
Franklin Park Conservatory

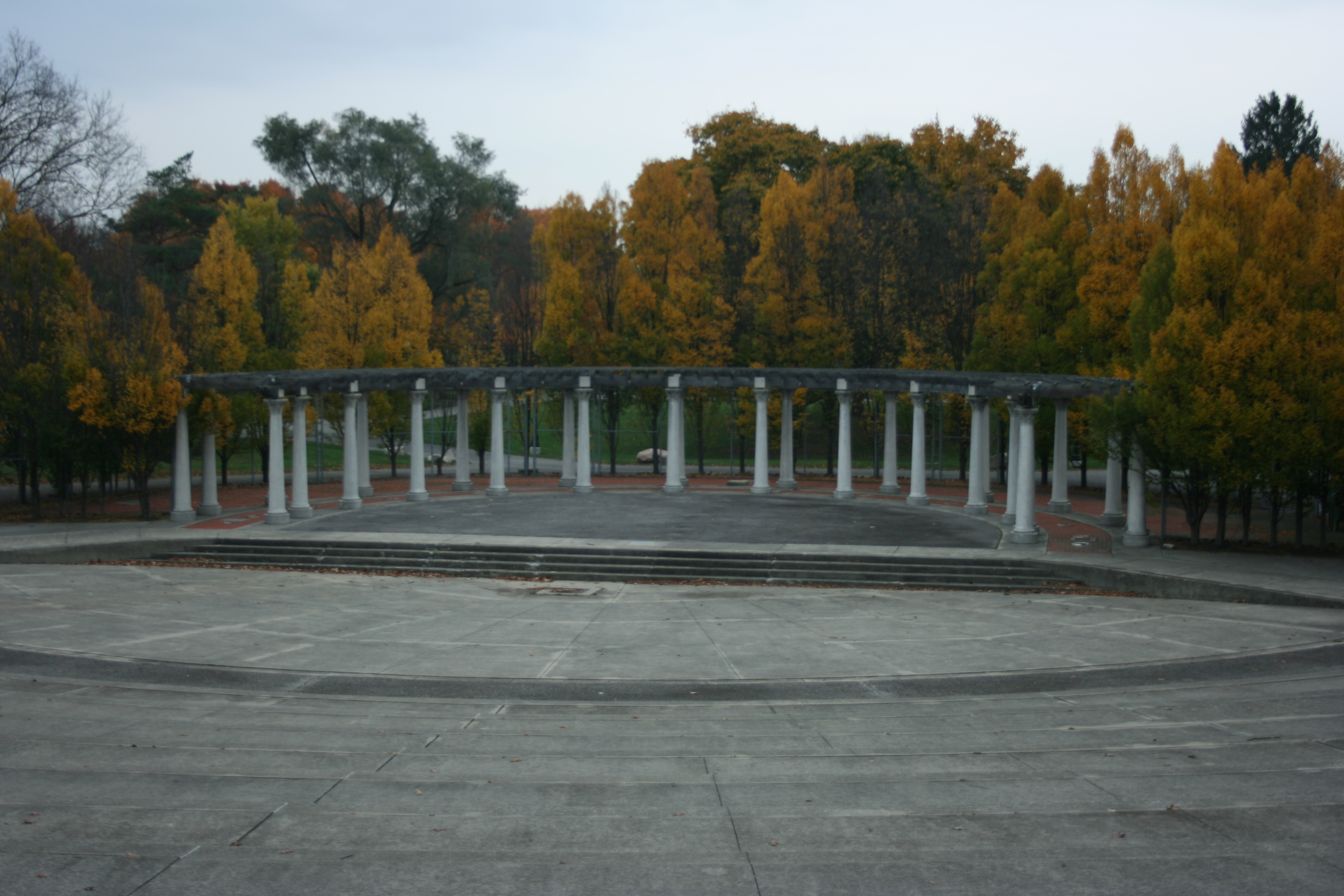
Amphitheater

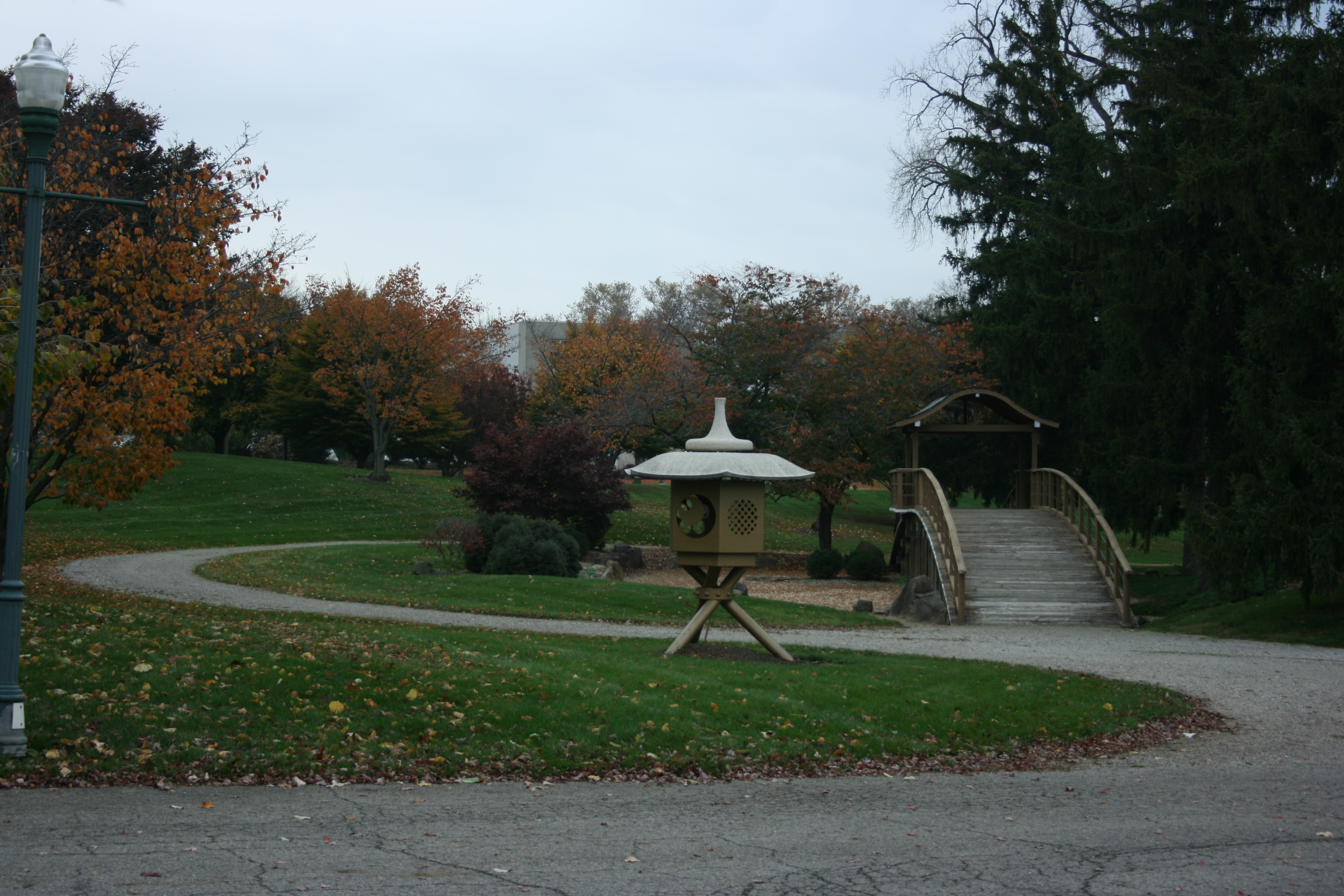
Asian garden

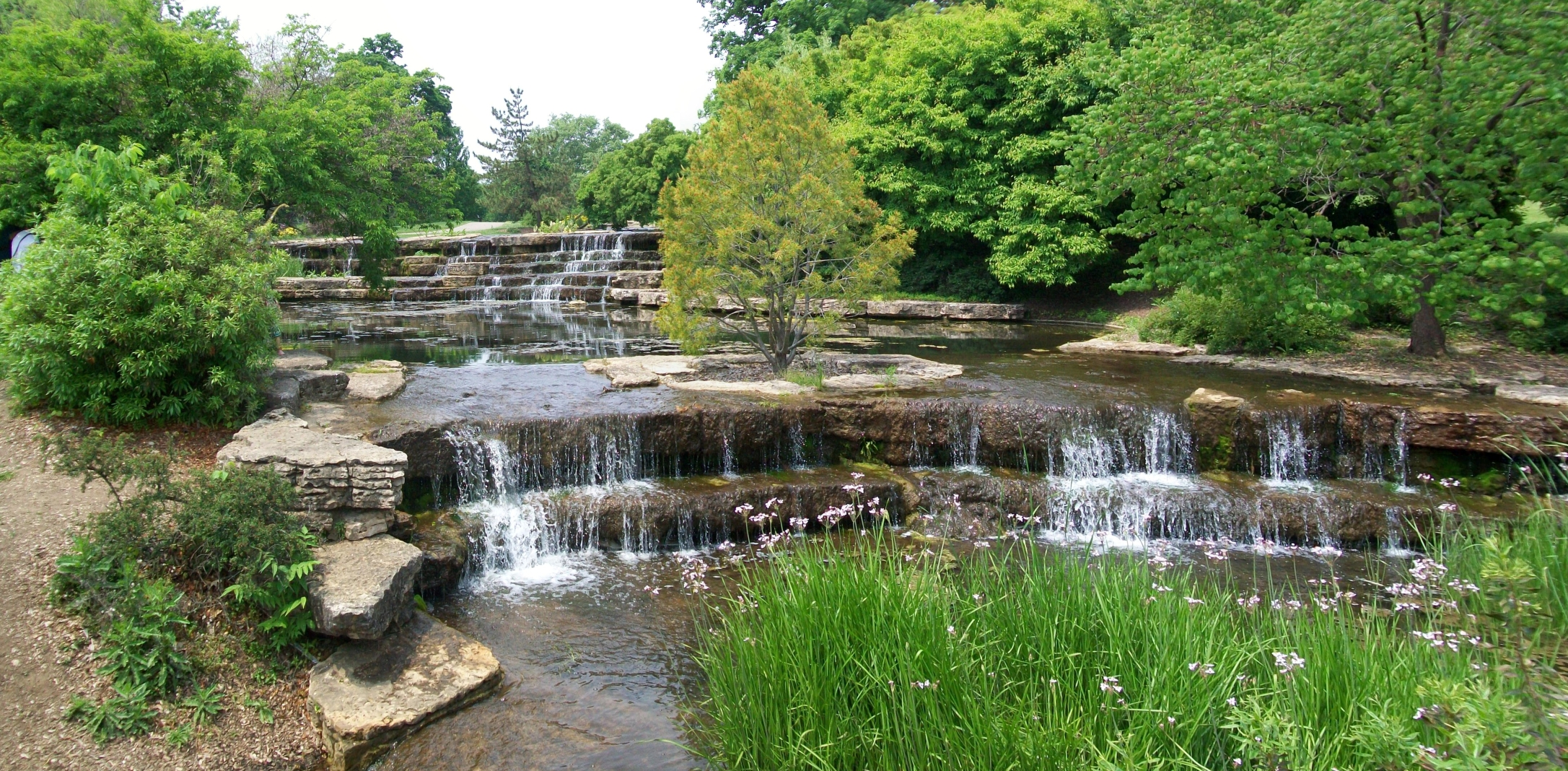
Waterfalls

== See also ==
- List of parks in Columbus, Ohio
