= AmeriFlora '92 =

Floral exhibition in Columbus, Ohio in 1992

AmeriFlora '92 logo

AmeriFlora '92 was an international horticultural exhibition held in Columbus, Ohio, United States from April 20 to October 12, 1992. Taking place on 88 acres (356,123 m^{2}) of landscaped grounds at Franklin Park, the exhibition cost $95 million to produce and attracted 5.5 million visitors. The exhibition was billed as the first international flower show in the United States.

== Origins ==
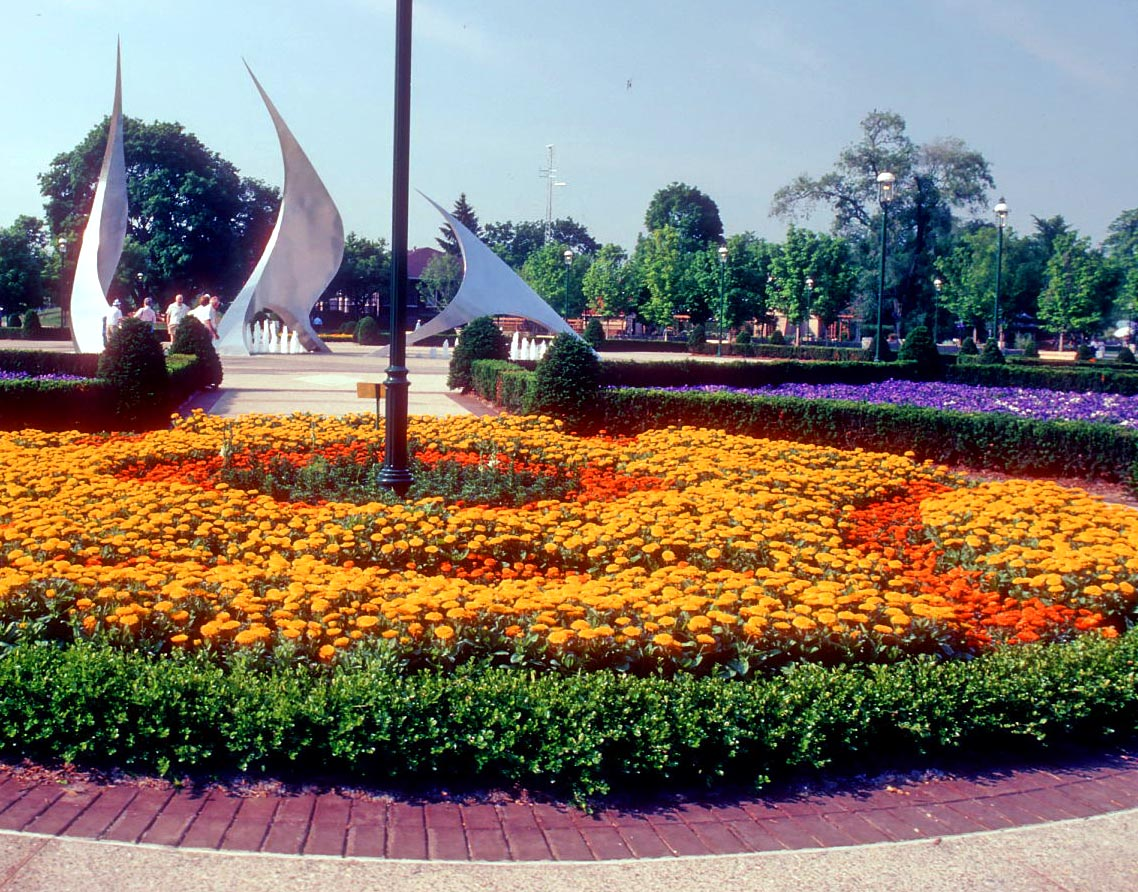
AmeriFlora centerpiece. The sculpture is intended to recall the sails on the Niña, Pinta, and Santa María.

AmeriFlora was formed and incorporated on November 14, 1986, and sanctioned as an official 1992 commemorative event by the United States Christopher Columbus Quincentenary Jubilee Commission in 1989. The organizers wanted to create national attention and put the otherwise quiet city "on the map".

It was billed as the first International Floral and Garden Exhibition in the United States. A team of central Ohio residents, special event planners and horticultural experts began working in the mid-1980s, and by 1992, the staff included over 200 full-time employees.

Franklin Park was part of AmeriFlora's bid for use of the site. It required not only cleaning it up for the exposition but removing all traces of the event and returning it to the city as a public park.

On the grounds sits the Franklin Park Conservatory, originally built in 1895 and modeled after the Glass Palace of the 1893 World's Columbian Exposition in Chicago. A $16 million renovation and expansion project made the Victorian structure the centerpiece of AmeriFlora and Franklin Park.

Topiary Park in downtown Columbus was also created as an exhibit for the festival.

== Financial performance ==
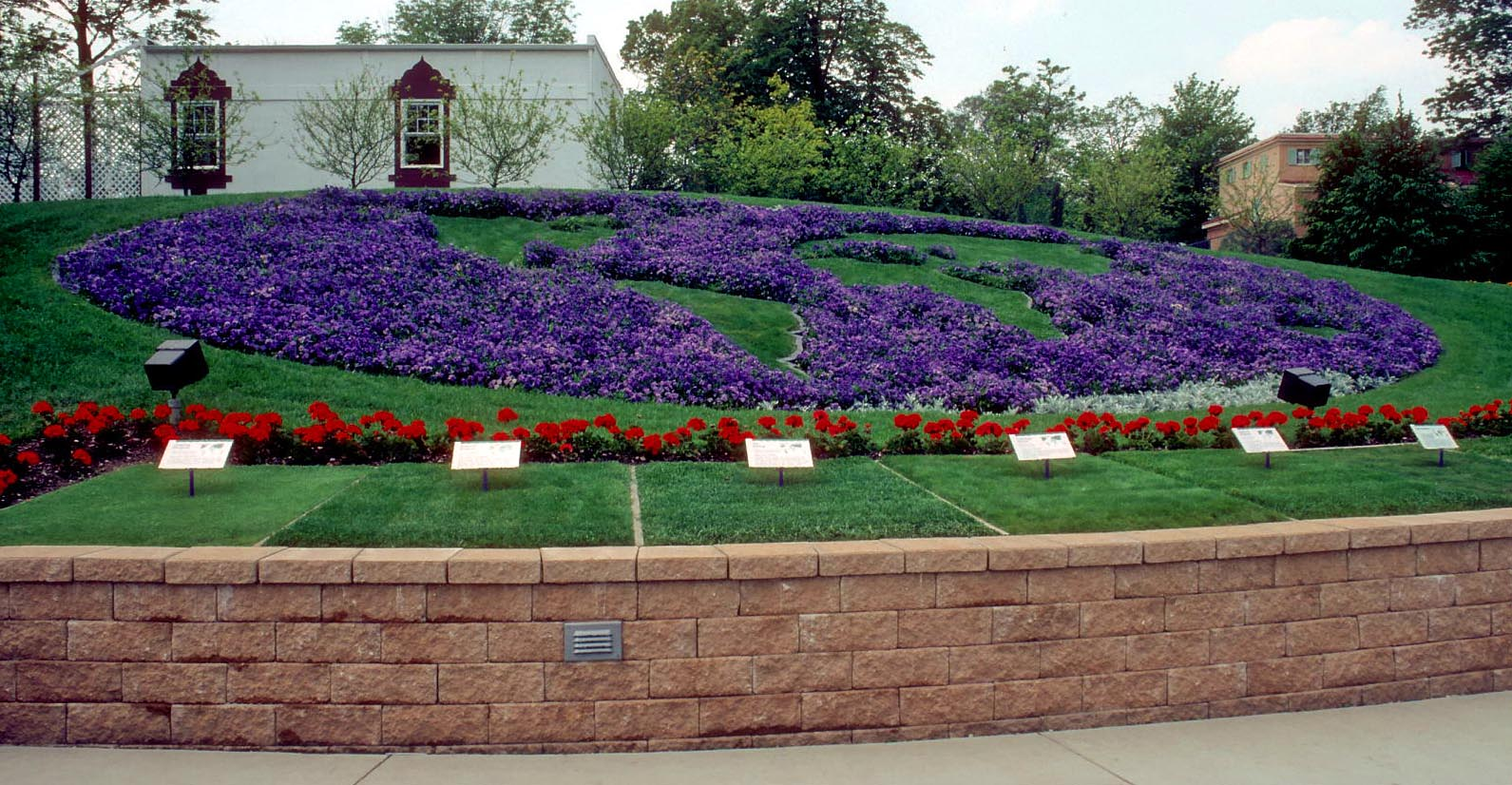
Typical outdoor floral display, in this case, a map of the world

Despite an extensive multi-year publicity and marketing campaign, AmeriFlora did not attract enough visitors to meet the bills, especially as the costs escalated before the gates even opened. Also cited as reasons for low attendance were: torrential rain (14 inches in July that often flooded the lagoons), a lack of interest from the surrounding black community, a boycott by Native Americans due to its celebration of Christopher Columbus, the exhibition's unclear image (as a flower show vs. as a theme park), a lack of enthusiasm for it by professional horticulturalists, and its $20 admission ($46 in 2025).

What was originally planned to be a two-week floral festival evolved into a six-month extravaganza, with the idea being that more tickets could be sold in 26 weeks than two. As operating costs mounted and corporate sponsorships failed to materialize, the attendance projections—and ticket prices—rose accordingly.

Learning a lesson from the monetary failure of the 1989 Son of Heaven Chinese art show (after which the city and state governments disbursed $1.6 million to help cover the loss), AmeriFlora's organizers only requested public money before the event, in the amount of $33 million. When AmeriFlora was not as successful as hoped, The Columbus Dispatch wrote a $2.6 million check to convert the 88-acre (360,000 m^{2}) property into a public park, as had been promised. Although AmeriFlora set up an escrow account to hold the $2.6 million for this purpose, some of its funding was to come from ticket sales, which failed to meet expectations. John F. Wolfe, who published the Dispatch, also served as President of AmeriFlora's Board of Trustees.

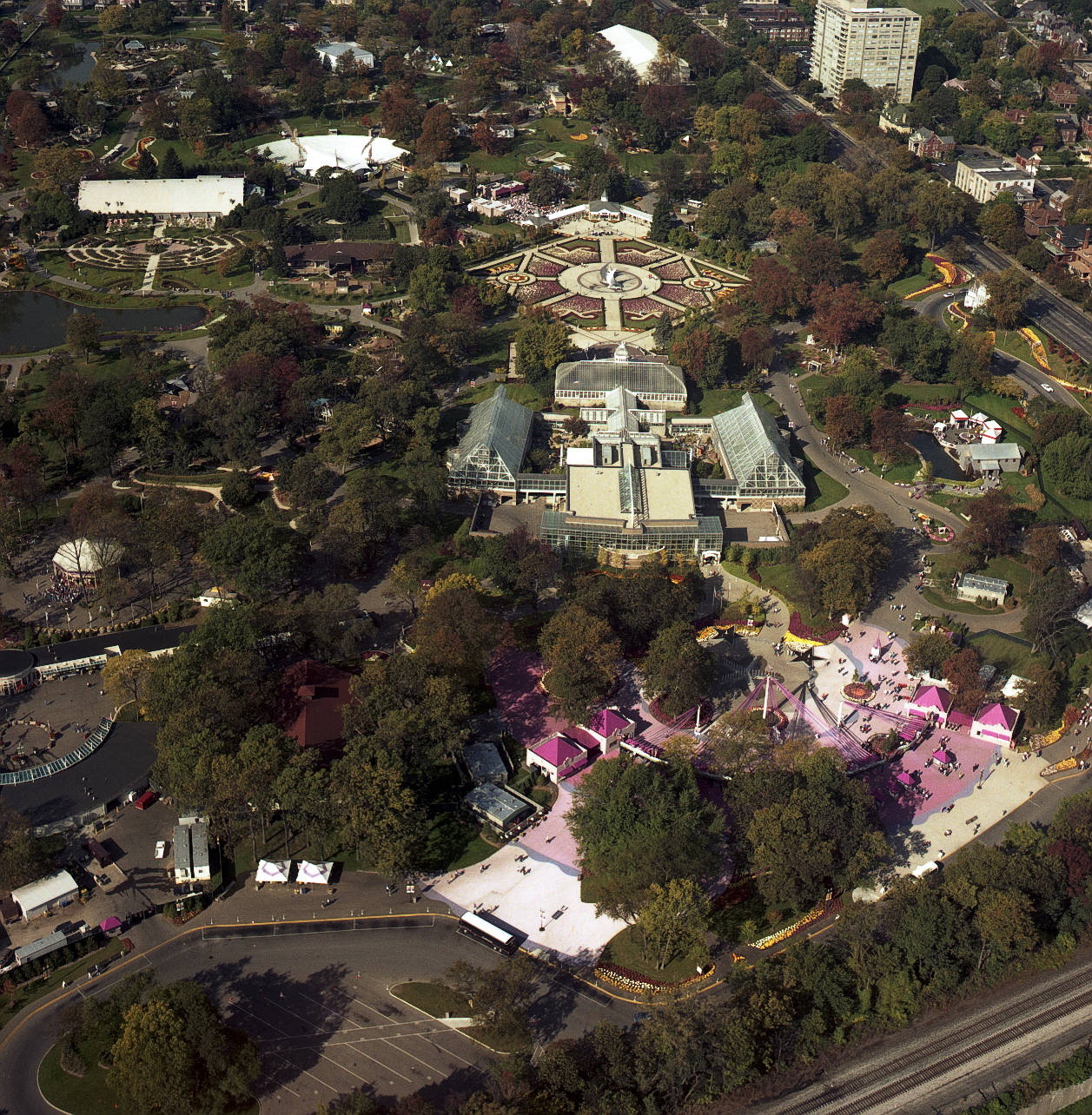
Aerial view of Franklin Park during AmeriFlora

AmeriFlora closed on Columbus Day 1992, but the cleanup, demolition of buildings, and conversion of the grounds into a public park extended into the winter months. Franklin Park Conservatory became the property of the non-profit Franklin Park Joint Recreation District, which still operates the facility today.

== See also ==
- Topiary Park
