= Olde Towne East =

Neighborhood of Columbus, Ohio, United States

- Neighborhood of Columbus
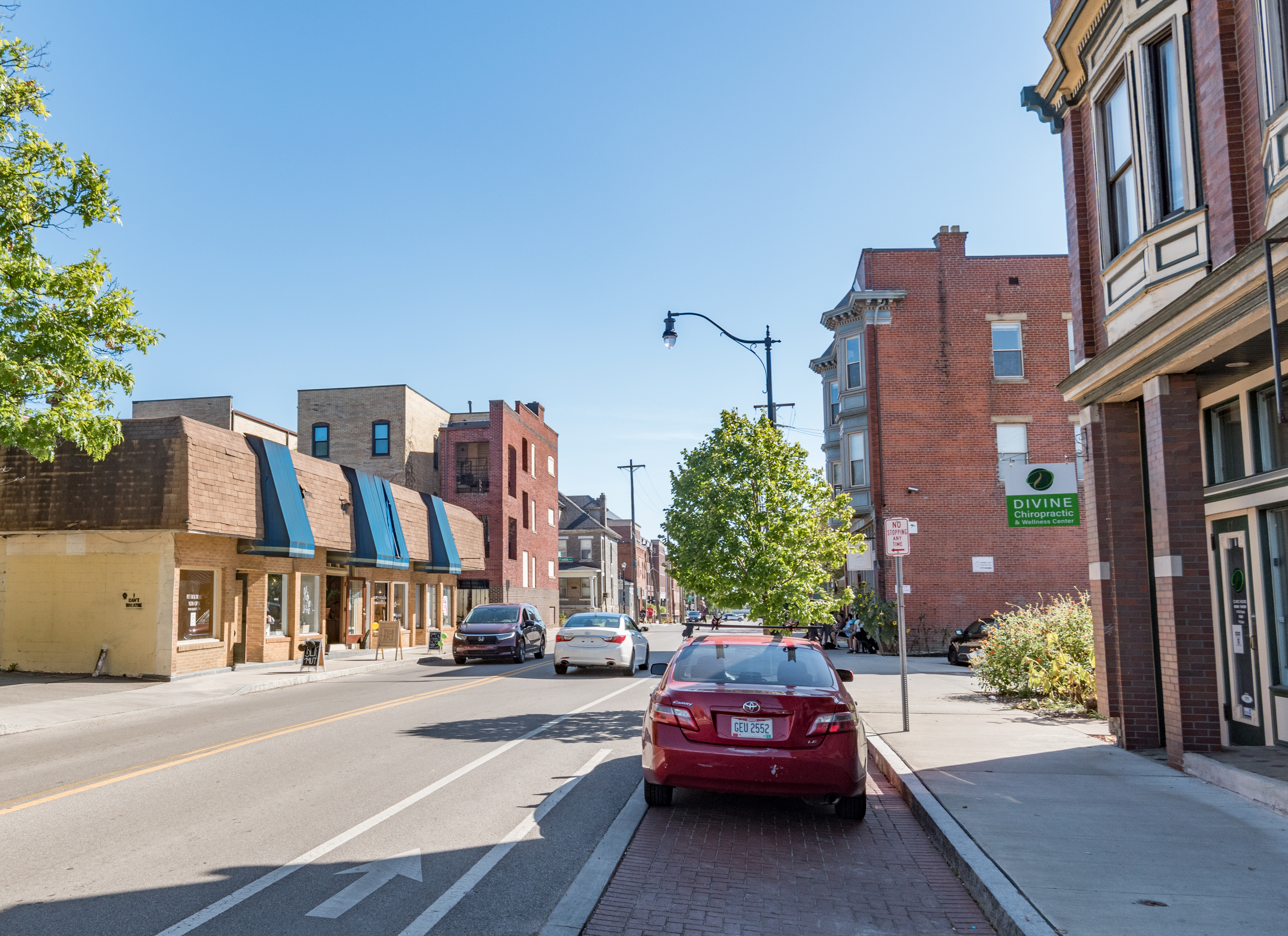
- Part of the Parsons Avenue business corridor
- Interactive map of the neighborhood
- Coordinates: 39°57′29″N 82°58′40″W
- Country: United States
- State: Ohio
- County: Franklin
- City: Columbus
- ZIP Code: 43205
- Area code: 614

Olde Towne East is a neighborhood located in the historical Near East Side of Columbus, Ohio and is one of Columbus' oldest neighborhoods. The area has over 1,000 homes, some as old as the 1830s, and more than 50 architectural styles as a result of its history. These homes were built by many of the famous individuals of Columbus including industrialists, lawyers, judges, teachers, architects, mayors, governors, and legislators, many of whom shaped the city.

== History ==
=== Pre-Columbian ===
The site had long been a waypoint between the Scioto and Muskingum Rivers. By the fifth century, the area had a mound-building culture whose influence lasted into the twentieth century. In later years, COSI would discover sites showing the neighborhood to have been occupied for at least ten thousand years.

=== 1800s ===
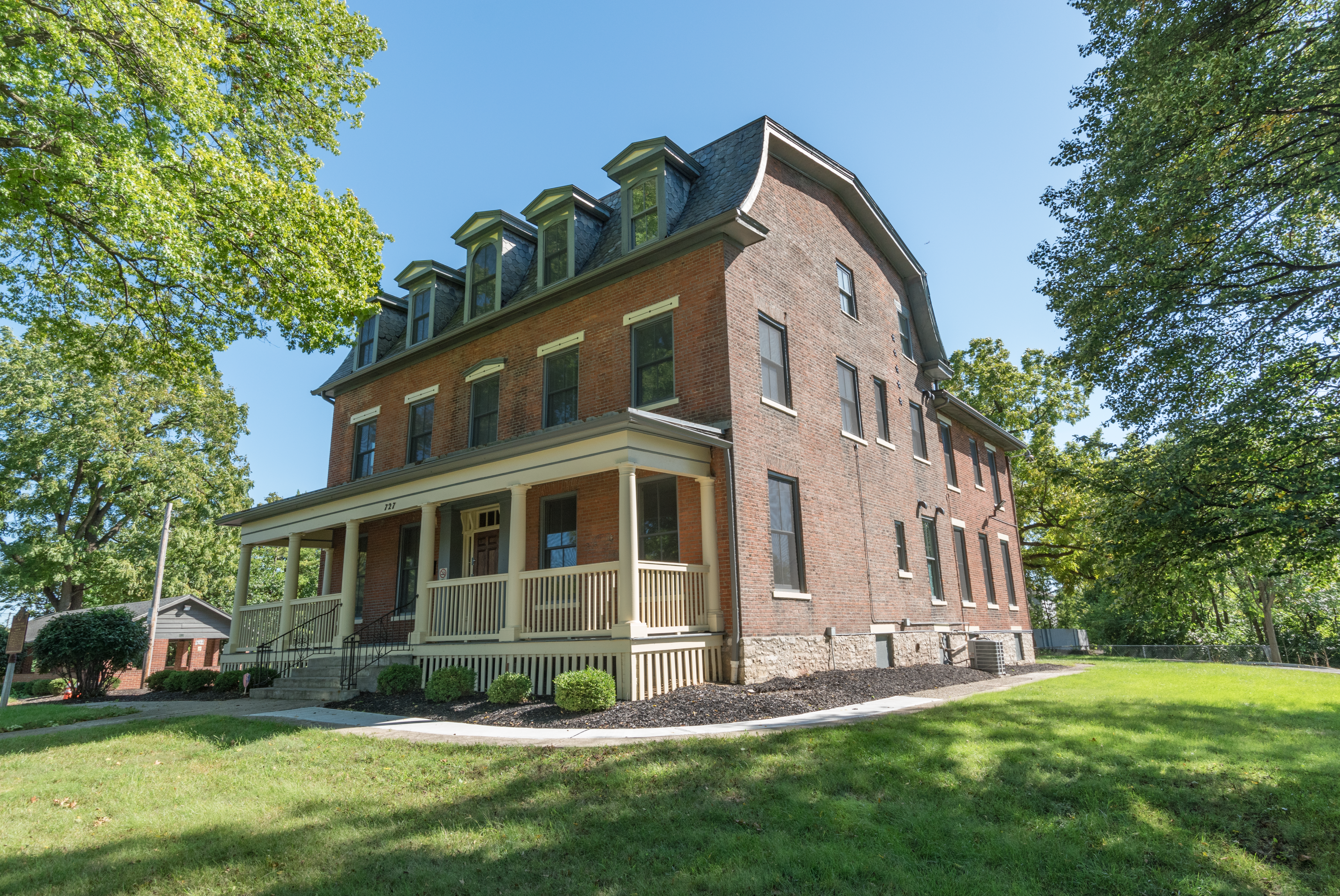
The Neville Mansion

The Town of Columbus was laid out in 1812 by Joel Wright, with today's Olde Towne East being directly east of it on a high ridge. A massive population boom followed the Civil War leading to growth along Broad, Long and Main streets. The major transportation was foot, horse, and horse-drawn buggy until the rise of the street car. The area evolved from farmhouses to a subdivision in the 1870s with a few houses remaining, but the majority being gutted in favor of new store frontage. This allowed people to leave the city and live in streetcar suburbs, causing further growth along Main, Long and Broad streets, and Mount Vernon Avenue. From this period comes the unique architectural style of Olde Towne East, there was a social mixing of rich and poor because residents were in close proximity to each other. It was common for wealthy individuals to live up the street from those of middle to lower class and in some instances bosses lived near their own employees.

=== 1900s ===
After World War I the area was diverse and encouraged interaction among social classes. At this time, the whole Near East had begun to develop identities within its neighborhoods. Following World War II along with the emerging commonality of the car, and the rise of suburbia, the whole Near East changed. By the 1950s much of the housing abandoned by wealthy owners began to deteriorate, while houses that were much older and bigger were divided into apartments and rooming houses. The construction of the Interstates and the Model Cities Program cleared sections of the Near East reducing housing stock, forcing residents to move, some believe that this results in the relative isolation of the Near East. Following the trend and emergence of the 1960s American Preservation movement, and further spurred by the National Historic Preservation Act of 1966 which established preservation legislative, the neighborhood association of the 1970s emerged to lead the recovery of Olde Towne East and the rest of the Near East community.

=== Present day ===
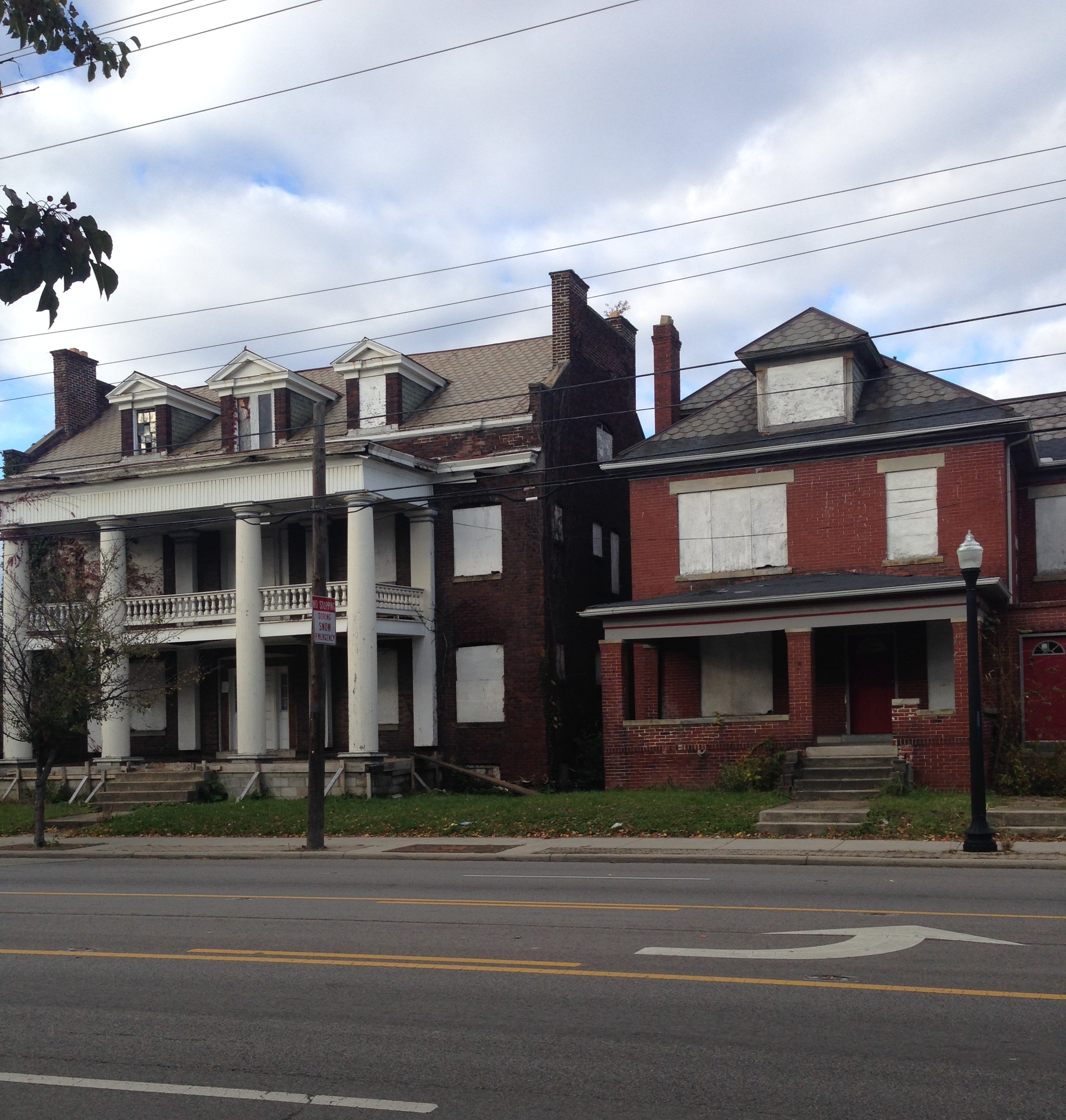
Vacant houses in Olde Towne East, 2014, now demolished

Today, Olde Towne East is undergoing steady growth. Homes are being renovated and new families are moving into the area. Young families are making a return to the community. This encouraged restoration of parks and small businesses. Olde Towne East is going through a major renovation due to a string of new businesses emerging. A series of bars, eateries and varied other business have opened up between Bryden Road and Broad Street in the Parsons Avenue business corridor. Main Street has also seen a boom in public and private development. The new commercial activity, which is concentrated around 18th and Oak streets, attracts residents and tourists breathing new life to what had been a "collection of houses".

== Geography ==
The north and east boundaries of the area known in modern times as Olde Towne East has long been disputed. According to the Olde Towne East Neighborhood Association (OTENA), it is bounded to the south by Interstate 70 by and to the west by Interstate 71. According to OTENA and the Columbus Dispatch (unsourced) the boundaries of the neighborhood are East Long Street to the north, Interstate 70 to the south, Wilson Avenue, the alley east of Latta Avenue, Miller Avenue and the alley east of Kendall Place to the east, and Interstate 71 to the west. This interpretation means that there is significant overlap with the Bronzeville, in the present day often known as King-Lincoln Bronzeville neighborhood (part of which is also known as "NOBO" or North of Broad) which identifies its southern boundary as East Broad Street, which is two blocks south of East Long Street. According to Google Maps Olde Towne East is bounded by Broad Street to the north, Interstate 70 to the south, South Champion Avenue and Wilson Avenue to the east and Interstate 71 to the west.

Also disputed is the eastern boundary of Olde Towne East, which according to OTENA extended into the Franklin Park neighborhood along a staggered boundary beyond Wilson Avenue. This controversy began circa 2003 when neighborhood boundary markers for Olde Towne East were placed along Bryden Road at Miller Avenue. The Franklin Park Civic Association (FPCA) has continued to assert that the border is Wilson Avenue, although when founded in 1974, the Franklin Park Area Improvement Association (an early development corporation which has evolved to become FPCA) included all of present-day Olde Towne East within its territory. The Olde Towne East Development Corporation (evolved to become OTENA) was established in 1975. In approximately 1997, the Franklin Park Area Association bylaws included the boundary as Wilson Avenue.

Olde Towne East is one of the neighborhoods of Columbus' Near East. It is bordered by the Discovery and Market Exchange Districts, other Near East neighborhoods of King-Lincoln Bronzeville, Franklin Park, Ohio, and the Near South neighborhoods of Livingston Park North and Old Oaks.

== Structures and landmarks ==
=== Columbus Public Health Building ===
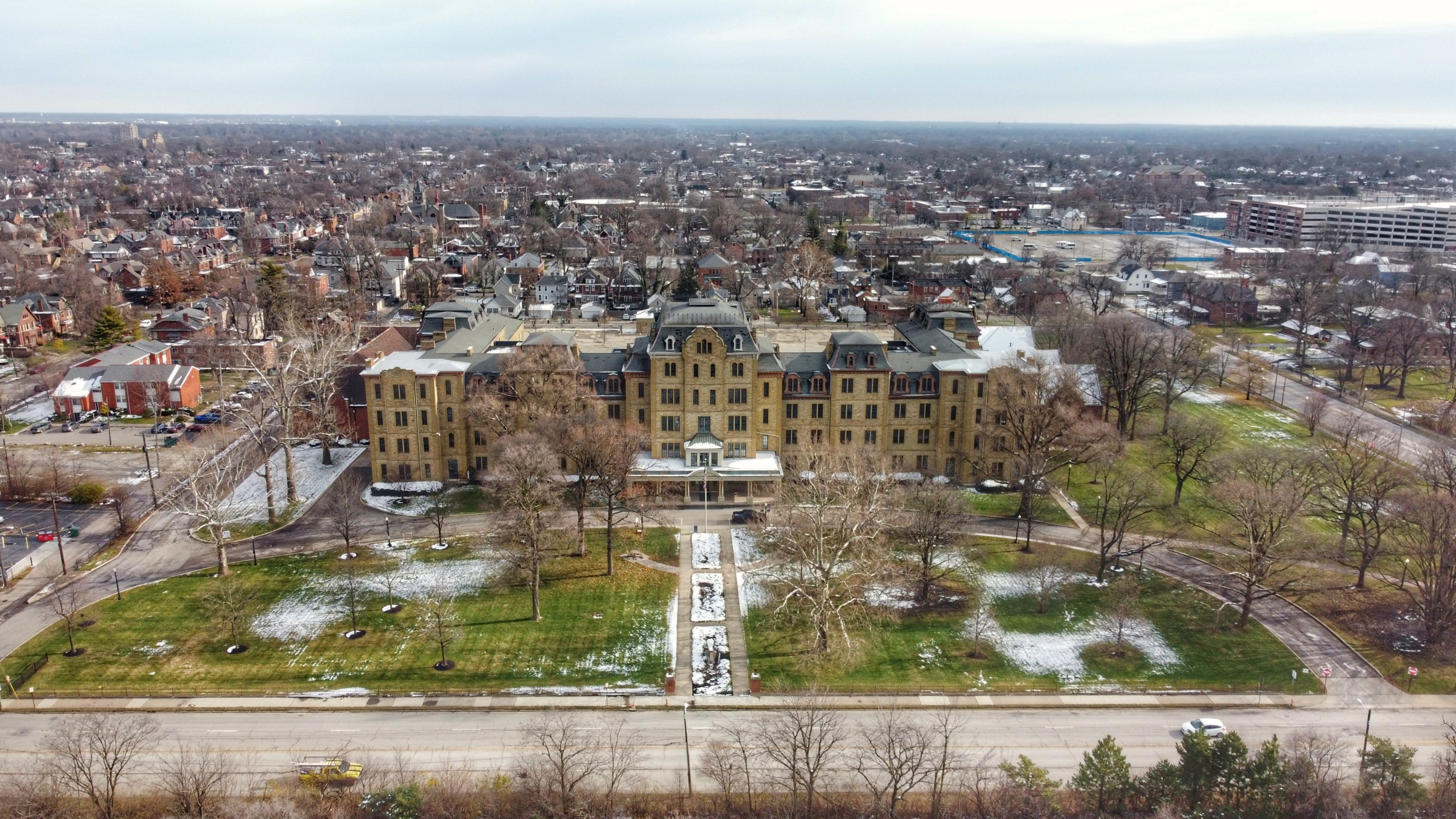
Columbus Public Health

The Columbus Public Health Building offers a variety of health related services ranging from alcohol and drug abuse clinics to tuberculosis control. They also collect and provide medical data via publications and research from the epidemiology department.

=== Kwanzaa Playground at English Park ===
English Park is home to the Kwanzaa Playground, which was developed in 1995 as a joint effort between the community and the City of Columbus. Seven local artists and sculptors contributed to the design and construction. The park has a human-like shape representing mankind's first ancestor. The park focuses on positive African-American imagery which embody the concept that "it takes a village to raise a child."

=== E.T Paul Company ===
In 1890s, it opens as a blacksmith shop. However, due to the emerging popularity of the car, it quickly transformed itself. Within ten years it started to sell tires and continues to do so, making it the oldest tire dealership in the United States.

E.T. Paul closed at the end of 2014 due to expansion on I-71.

=== Other structures ===
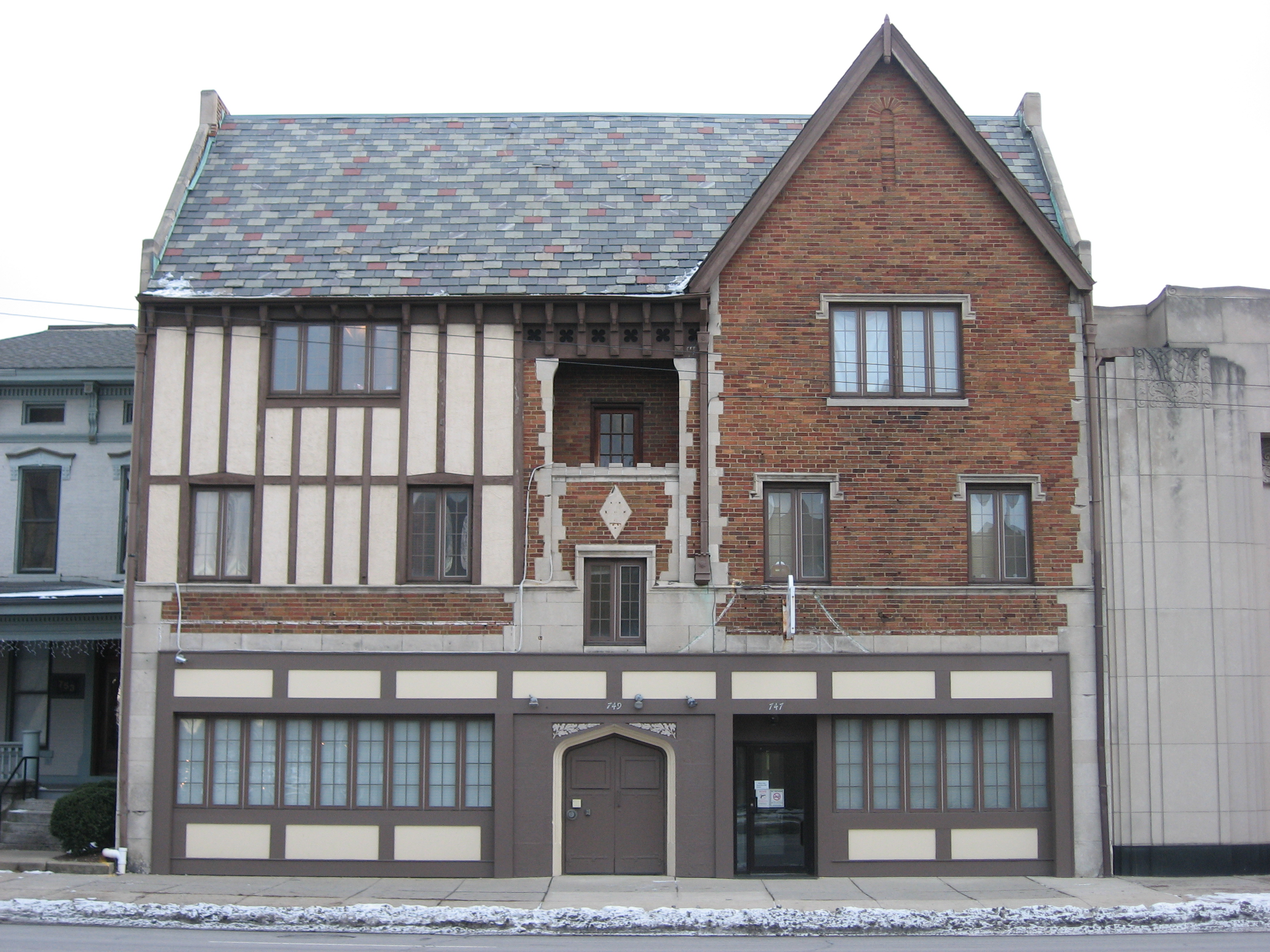
The East Broad Street Commercial Building

The W.H. Jones Mansion, Central Assurance Company, East Broad Street Commercial Building, and Orebaugh House, all represent "over half a century of distinct architectural styles". The Jones House sits on a stone foundation, with a slate roof, gables set above a circular tower flanked by tall, decorated chimneys. The Central Assurance Insurance Company is a 1940s Art Deco style building. Next to it is the Tudor style half-timbered 1920s mixed use East Broad Street Commercial Building, which housed the Jong Mea Restaurant. The downstairs portion was the family-run restaurant and the upstairs was the family's residence. Finally, the Orebaugh House, an 1880s Italianate home with a L-shaped porch and frieze style windows.

== Notable people ==
Olde Towne East is and has been home to many notable people.

=== The arts ===
James Valentine (photographer), George Bellows Jr. (artist), Alice Schille (artist), and Aniana Toska (cultural critic).

=== Architecture ===
Joseph Yost, George Bellows Sr.

=== Business ===
H.S. Hallwood (owner of a paving block company), Dr. Louis M. Early (inventor of radiograph paper), Joe Carr (NFL founder)

=== Performance ===
Mary Campbell (the only two-time Miss America), Bell Wanzo (musician)

== Architecture and historical preservation ==
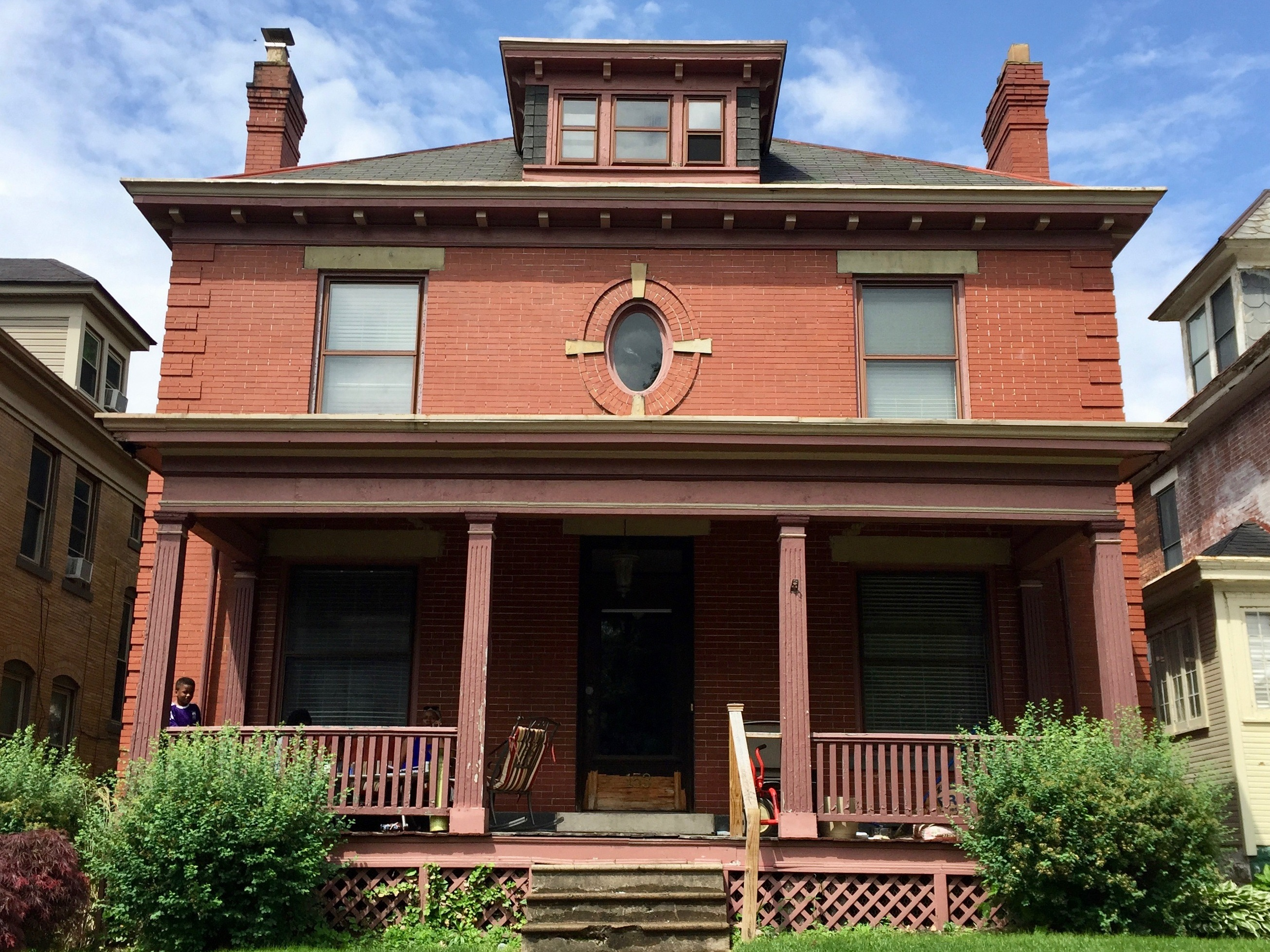
Olde Towne East home with a large front porch

=== Architecture diversity and origin ===
There is no distinct architectural style in Olde Towne East. The uniqueness results from the early diversity of social classes. Though housing interiors were predominantly utilitarian, a large front porch is a common aesthetic to the community. It is believed that the big porches "shaped the neighborhood" and the way people lived as residents often socialized on their porches.

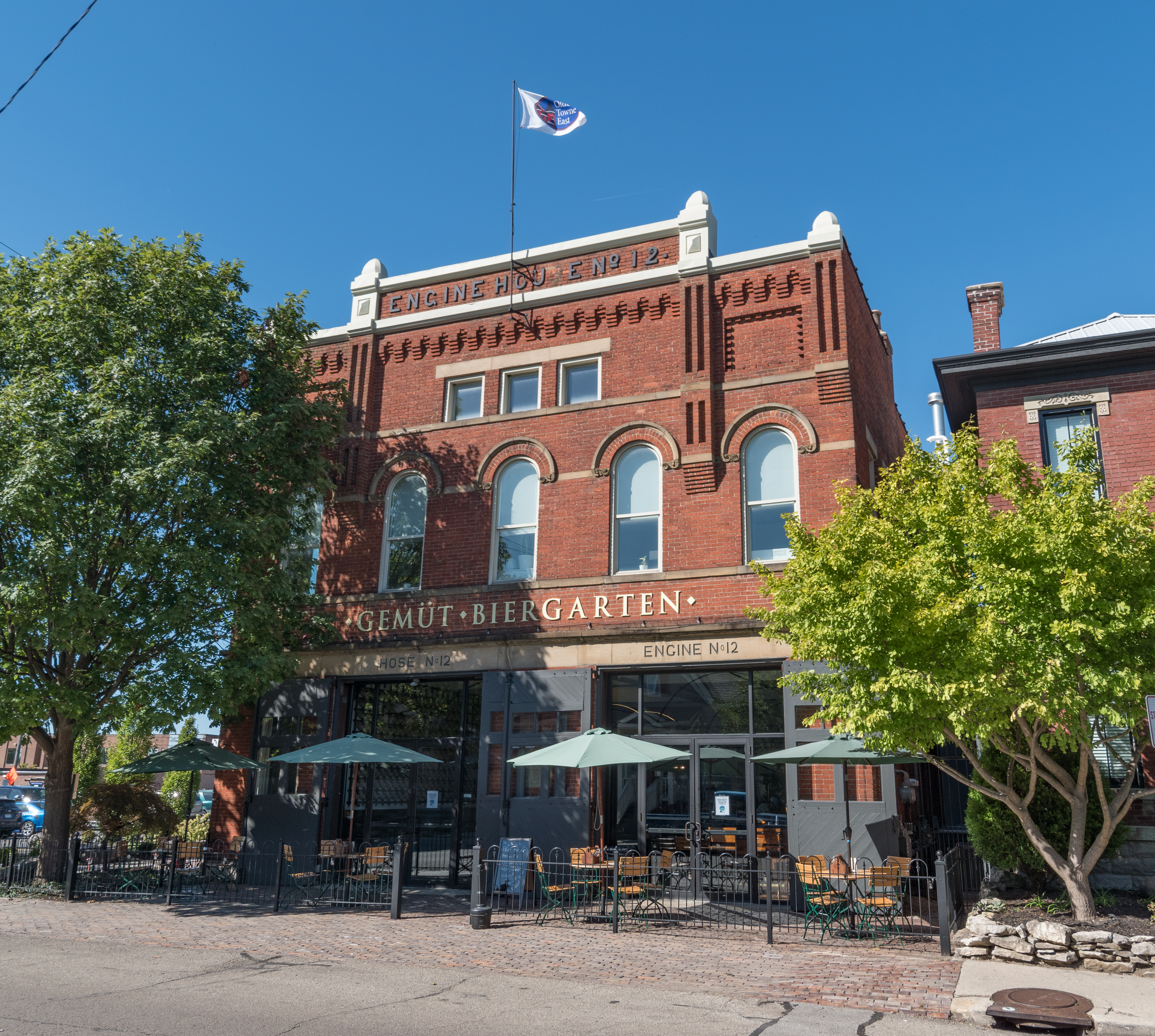
Gemüt Biergarten brewery and restaurant, in the former Engine House No. 12

=== Historic preservation and the neighborhood association ===
Historic preservation programs began nationally under the American Preservation movement which gained popularity in the 1960s, and was further spurred by the National Historic Preservation Act of 1966, which established preservation legislative. The neighborhood association of the 1970s emerged to preserve the legacy of the neighborhood's former inhabitants. The demolition list emerged and was left to the neighborhood association to delegate if the building was preserved or destroyed.

== Demographics ==
=== Changing demographics ===
Since Columbus industrialized, a new middle class was formed by a group of white collar workers. However, the emergence of the streetcar soon moved them away from the industrial Olde Towne East, and following this, the rise of the car moved wealthier residents out, too. Shortly after, a large population of African-Americans moved in, further dividing the interstates from Columbus, which affected Olde Towne East's economy.

=== Current demographics ===
Following the above problems, and many other nationwide issues that emerged with time, the Neighborhood revival movement began to motivate residents into repairing houses and beautification projects. Olde Towne East is predominantly African American, with a sizable gay and lesbian population. Most residents have at least a bachelor's degree, and are earning $13,000 to $35,000 annually.

=== Education ===
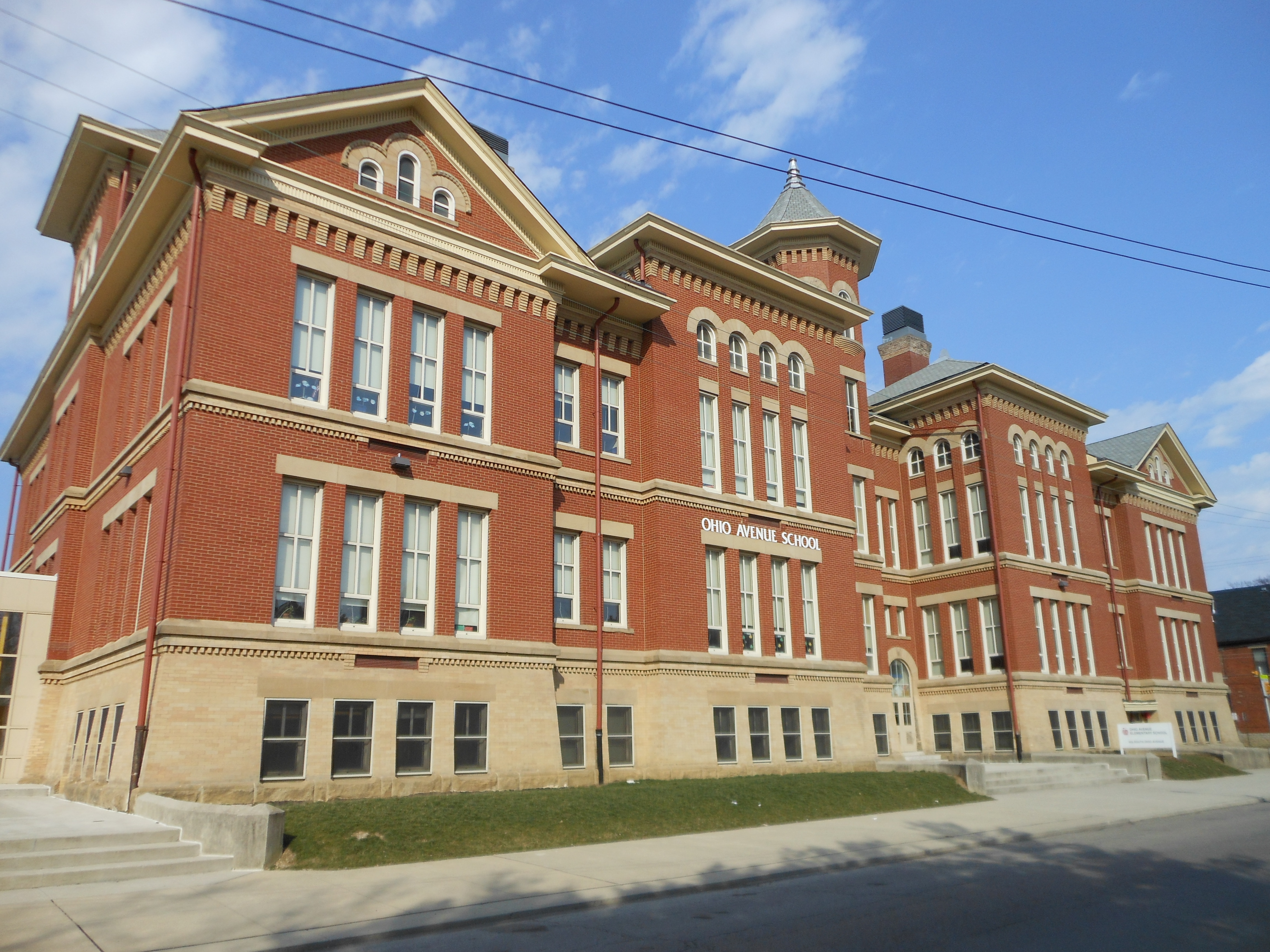
Ohio Avenue Elementary School

The education in Olde Towne East has consistently higher enrollment rates than the rest of Columbus in all areas of education. There more are students per capita in Olde Towne East than the average of Columbus, showing it to have a predominantly young population, with roughly a third of grade school students are in private schools in Olde Towne East as opposed to the less than 15 percent of Columbus.

=== Economic Development ===
Olde Towne East is involved in the Neighborhood Commercial Revitalization Program (NCR) which is a Business improvement program for the district for Columbus and other cities in the Northeastern United States. The NCR matches grants and loans, while providing: technical assistance, capital improvements and planning services for business organization. Staff in the NCR even offer help to individual businesses for architectural designs and exterior rehabilitation efforts of their property. This is done primarily through the NCR's Investment Fund, the Commercial Improvement Loan Fund, Facade Renovation Fund, and the Storefront Renovation Grant Fund.

== Entertainment ==
Hot Times Festival is a music festival celebrated from September 10–12, known for a diverse array of entertainers.

Blackburn Recreation Center features an art room which has a pottery kiln, the swimming pool, a dance room, meeting rooms, a volleyball court, and amenities to maintain a boxing program. There is also a basketball court but some argue against the loss of basketball privileges that are in place for adults.

Chop Chop Gallery is an art gallery and event space usually featuring the work of local artists.

== Controversy ==
Many believe Olde Towne East will be gentrified the way the Short North was gentrified; this issue is addressed in the documentary movie Flag Wars which chronicles tension between black working-class families and an influx of white gay homebuyers in the Olde Towne East neighborhood.

In March 2014, Brian Higgins (Columbus developer) won the right to add a modern building to Olde Towne East, for the sake of diversity. Some residents believe that the "project is not compatible with the existing character of the neighborhood" since it is a historic community. The plan's supporters claimed the project would clean the one-acre vacant lot which formerly site housed a carpet factory said to have "laced [the ground] with arsenic and other chemicals".
