= Social services and homelessness in Columbus, Ohio =

Aspects of support for low-income and homeless residents of Columbus, Ohio

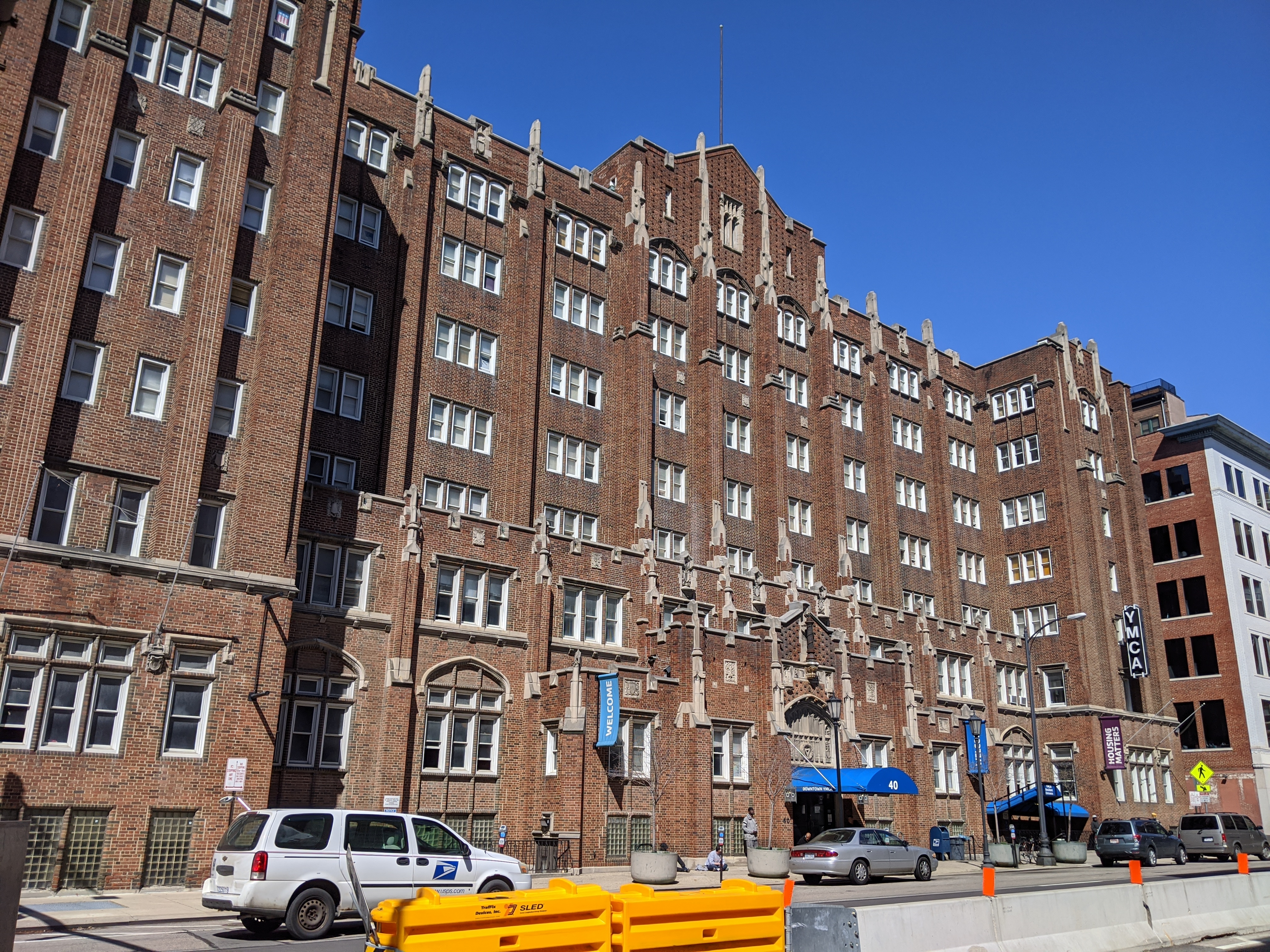
The Downtown YMCA was the largest YMCA resident facility in the United States

Columbus, the capital city of Ohio, has a history of social services to provide for low- and no-income residents. The city has many neighborhoods below the poverty line, and has experienced a rise in homelessness in recent decades. Social services include cash- and housing-related assistance, case management, treatment for mental health and substance abuse, and legal and budget/credit assistance.

Amid food insecurity in Columbus, with several neighborhoods as food deserts, nonprofit organizations operate several no-charge groceries, pharmacies, and stores in the city.

== History ==
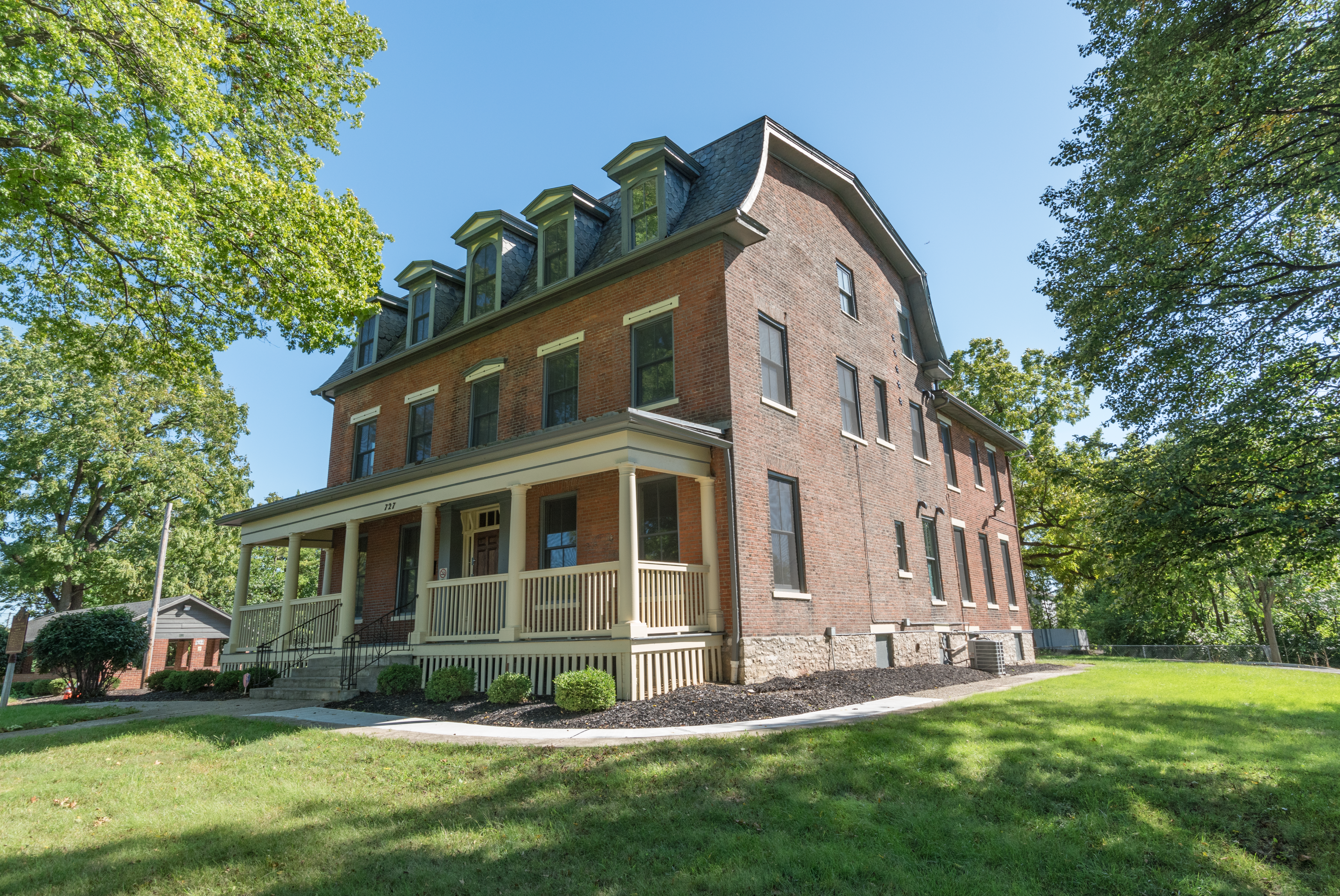
The Neville Mansion, a shelter for the poor and homeless for a century

Annual point-in-time count of homeless in Columbus and Franklin County
Transitional housing
Sheltered
Unsheltered

Social services have existed in Columbus since the 1830s. In decades prior, it was stated that the population was low enough that neighbors and townspeople could help each other overcome hardships. A cholera pandemic, which hit Columbus in 1832, drew attention to poor, sick, and displaced residents, many of whom were affected by the impacts of the disease.

The first organized charity was the Columbus Female Benevolent Society, formed in 1835 to give clothing and monetary donations to families in need. It was co-founded by Hannah Neil, who went on to establish a day school for poor children in 1855, and established it as the Industrial School Association in 1858. In 1865, the first homeless shelter was established, a former soldier's home. There were more applications than there was room, and so the Neville Mansion was converted to become the Hannah Neil Mission and Home for the Friendless in 1868. The shelter also acted as an emergency shelter, until support could be offered elsewhere.

Redevelopment and gentrification has displaced low income and homeless residents of Franklinton, the Short North, and other neighborhoods in Columbus. Redevelopments in 1997 displaced homeless residents of the Scioto Peninsula, and forced the closure of a shelter and relocation of another. The nonprofit Community Shelter Board established the Scioto Peninsula Relocation Task Force to find stable housing and support services for these displaced residents.

Although national homeless rates for families declined by about 32 percent in the 2010s, Columbus experienced an increase of 20 percent. In 2019, the area shelter system reached its highest-ever occupancy rate, with 570 people served. The Columbus Dispatch attributed the rise to increasing rents outpacing wages, low vacancies allowing landlords to be selective, the city's growing population, low funding for re-housing, and limited affordable housing options. In 2018, emergency shelters in the county served about 9,200 adults and children, and a one-night count in January 2019 estimated 1,907 people either in shelters or on the streets. In 2019, the Dispatch reported on the city's policy of dismantling homeless camps, displacing its residents without a plan to re-house them. The city recognized problems in some of the camps, including the danger of propane tanks across the area, as well as a murder taking place in one of the camps in April 2016.

== Homeless shelters and support ==
=== Shelters ===
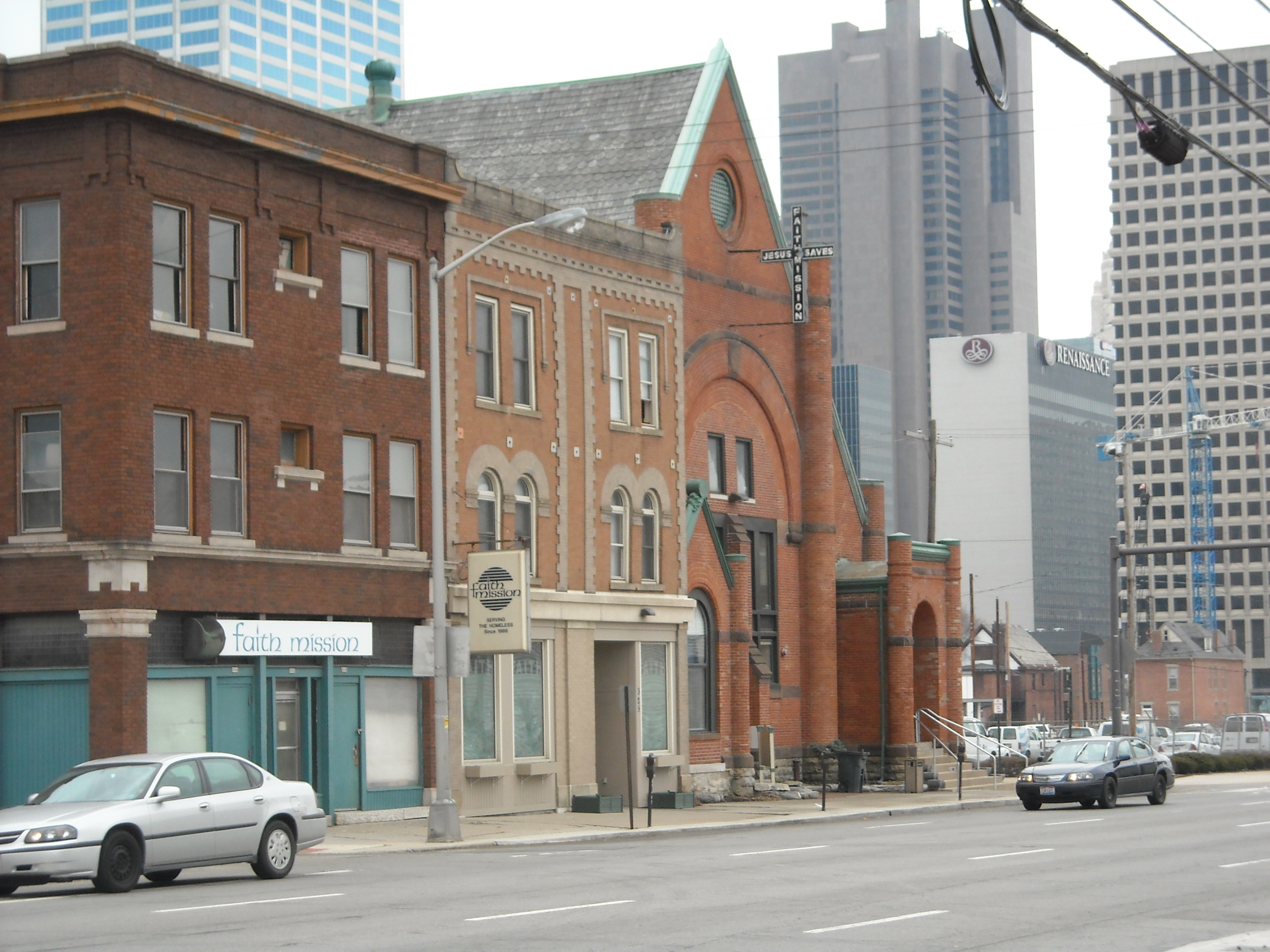
Faith Mission's former location, including at the former Welsh Presbyterian Church

Homeless shelters include the YWCA Family Center, Faith Mission's Emergency Shelter for Men, Rebecca's Place Women's Homeless Shelter, the Open Shelter, Friends of the Homeless Men's Shelter, Haven of Hope House, and Huckleberry House Emergency Overnight Shelter. The YMCA of Central Ohio also provides shelter to the homeless and those at risk of homelessness. The organization maintains two shelters: Franklin Station and the Van Buren Center. In March 2020, amid the COVID-19 pandemic, the Community Shelter Board and YMCA together created a new homeless shelter for those who have symptoms or test positive for COVID-19. The shelter, known as the Shelter for Isolation and Quarantine, is in a North Side hotel. At its peak, the shelter housed 39 people.

Columbus is one of only about six places in the United States that guarantee a right to shelter for families. The list also includes New York City, the state of Massachusetts, and Washington, D.C. (though only during hypothermic or hyperthermic conditions).

=== Prevention initiatives ===
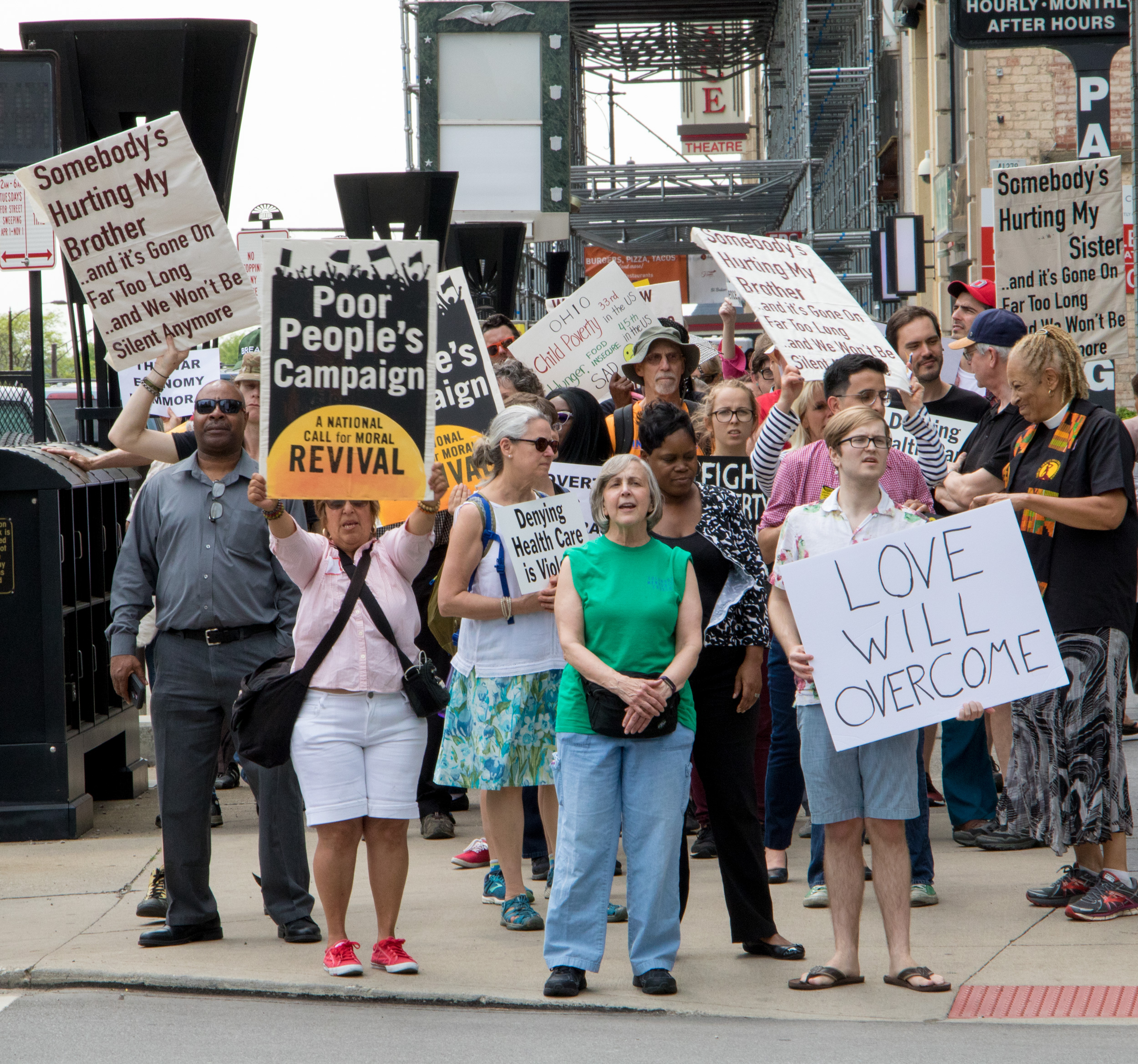
Poor People's Campaign in Columbus, May 14, 2018

The first public housing project in Columbus opened in 1940. Poindexter Village, established in the present-day King-Lincoln Bronzeville neighborhood, was also one of the first public housing projects in the United States. The development was successful in keeping families out of homelessness and poverty until the late 20th century, when it declined and was later mostly demolished.

The Community Shelter Board began its homelessness prevention initiative in the late 1980s in response to growing demands for emergency shelter. The organization collaborates with government, corporate, nonprofit, and philanthropic organizations to pool resources together. It determines individuals eligible by having a household income of 50 percent or lower than the Area Median Income, by having a steady and verifiable income, with housing costs of 50 percent or less of the family income, or 45 percent or less of the individual's income. The requirements are high enough that it can result in shelters being unduly used by individuals with significant economic, social, or psychological obstacles.

For homelessness prevention, the Community Shelter Board offers cash assistance (e.g. for rent, food, utilities, gasoline), housing-related assistance (e.g. maintenance, search support, relocation, mortgage assistance), case management (for employment or support with mental health or in domestic violence or substance abuse), offers treatment for mental health and substance abuse, and offers legal and budget/credit assistance.

Since 2008, the Columbus Coalition for the Homeless has produced Street Speech, the only street newspaper in the city. The paper is sold and written by and for those experiencing or who were once experiencing homelessness. The vendors are vetted, trained, and licensed to dispense the papers. The newspaper raises awareness about homelessness, brings in revenue for the street vendors, and provides useful information for those in need. All earnings are donations kept by the vendor.

== Other services ==
Goods for parents, including clothing and baby diapers, are provided free at the Little Bottoms Free Store in Franklinton.

=== Addiction treatment ===
Since 1999, the Engagement Center at Maryhaven has treated people with drug and alcohol dependencies through its emergency shelter. The center also established 50 beds for crisis stabilization services. Maryhaven replaced several functions of the Open Shelter, which closed in 2004.

=== Food assistance ===
Food security is an issue in Columbus; according to a 2018 study, about 32 percent of households in neighborhoods along High Street had low or very low food security, with 27 percent finding it difficult to obtain fresh fruits and vegetables. Food deserts included Franklinton, the Hilltop, East and Northeast Columbus, South and East Linden, Downtown, and the Arena District.

Access to food is addressed in the city through food panties as well as nonprofit markets offering free or discounted groceries. In 2018, the All People's Fresh Market opened on Parsons Avenue and the Jubilee Market and Cafe opened in Franklinton, while the Fresh Market and Charitable Pharmacy opened in the Linden neighborhood in 2021. The Mid-Ohio Food Collective also operates three free grocery markets in the city.

== In the media ==
Low-income living with social service assistance was depicted in the pilot of 30 Days, a Morgan Spurlock television show. In the episode, aired in 2005, Spurlock and his fiance unsuccessfully attempt to live in the city's Franklinton neighborhood and work in the city on minimum wage.
