= Ohio Arts Council =

Agency serving the US state of Ohio

The Ohio Arts Council (OAC) is an agency serving the U.S. state of Ohio. Its offices are in the Rhodes State Office Tower in Columbus, Ohio.

== History ==
Established in 1965, its mission is to "foster and encourage the development of the arts and assist the preservation of Ohio's cultural heritage." Each year it awards grants to arts organizations and individuals throughout the state.

Since 2003, it has awarded the Ohio Heritage Award each year, an award modeled on the National Endowment for the Arts's National Heritage Fellowship.

For years, the council was based in the LeVeque Tower in Downtown Columbus, Ohio. In 1983, the agency moved to the Neville Mansion just outside of Downtown. In 2010, it moved back Downtown, into the Rhodes State Office Tower, its current location.

In January 2021, Susan Allan Block, wife of the owner of Block Communications, resigned from the Ohio Arts Council after she posted vulgar comments about Vice President-elect Kamala Harris and support for the 2021 storming of the United States Capitol.

== Programs and Operations ==
The State Arts Plan 2015-2017 was created in response to the needs of everyday Ohioans. Informed by focus groups, one-on-one interviews, site visits to organizations and communities, and a statewide survey of all 88 counties—the State Arts Plan serves as the foundation for the agency's future.

Four actions areas: INVEST, ENGAGE, INNOVATE and LEAD underpin the plan, guiding program prioritization and resource deployment.

The Council operates the Riffe Gallery in the lobby of the Vern Riffe Center for Government & the Arts at 77 S. High Street, near the Ohio Statehouse. It has also funded artists in Allen County,

Lorain County,

and elsewhere. Other recent projects include Murals Across Ohio.
