= Columbus Developmental Center =

School for developmental disabilities in Columbus, Ohio

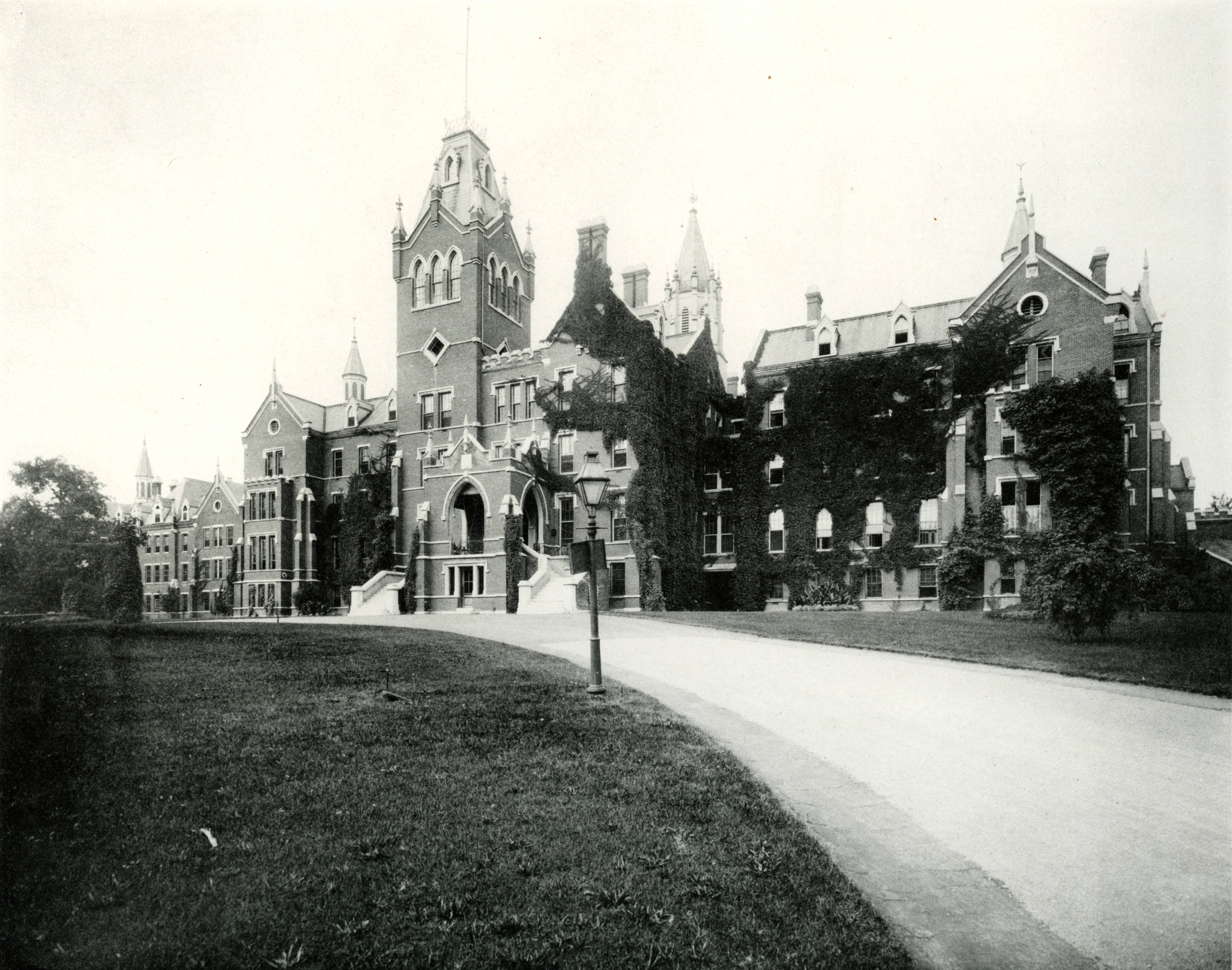
- Former main building, c. 1897

Location
- 1601 W. Broad Street, Columbus, Ohio
- Coordinates: 39.952188°N 83.044941°W

Information
- Former name: Ohio Institution for Feeble-Minded Youth (1881-1945)
- Type: Residential, for those with disabilities
- Established: August 3, 1857
- Founders: R. J. Patterson and trustees
- Superintendent: Randon Watson
- Campus size: 92 acres (37 ha)

The Columbus Developmental Center (CDC) is a state-supported residential school for people with developmental disabilities, located in the Hilltop neighborhood of Columbus, Ohio. The school, founded in 1857, was the third of these programs developed by a U.S. state, after Massachusetts in 1848 and New York in 1851.

Names for the school included: the Ohio Asylum for the Education of Idiotic and Imbecile Youth (from 1857 to 1878), the Ohio Institution for the Education of Idiotic and Imbecile Youth (1878–1881), the Ohio Institution for Feeble-Minded Youth (1881–1945), the Columbus State School (1945–1970), the Columbus State Institute (1970–1980), and the Columbus Developmental Center (1980–present).

== Attributes ==
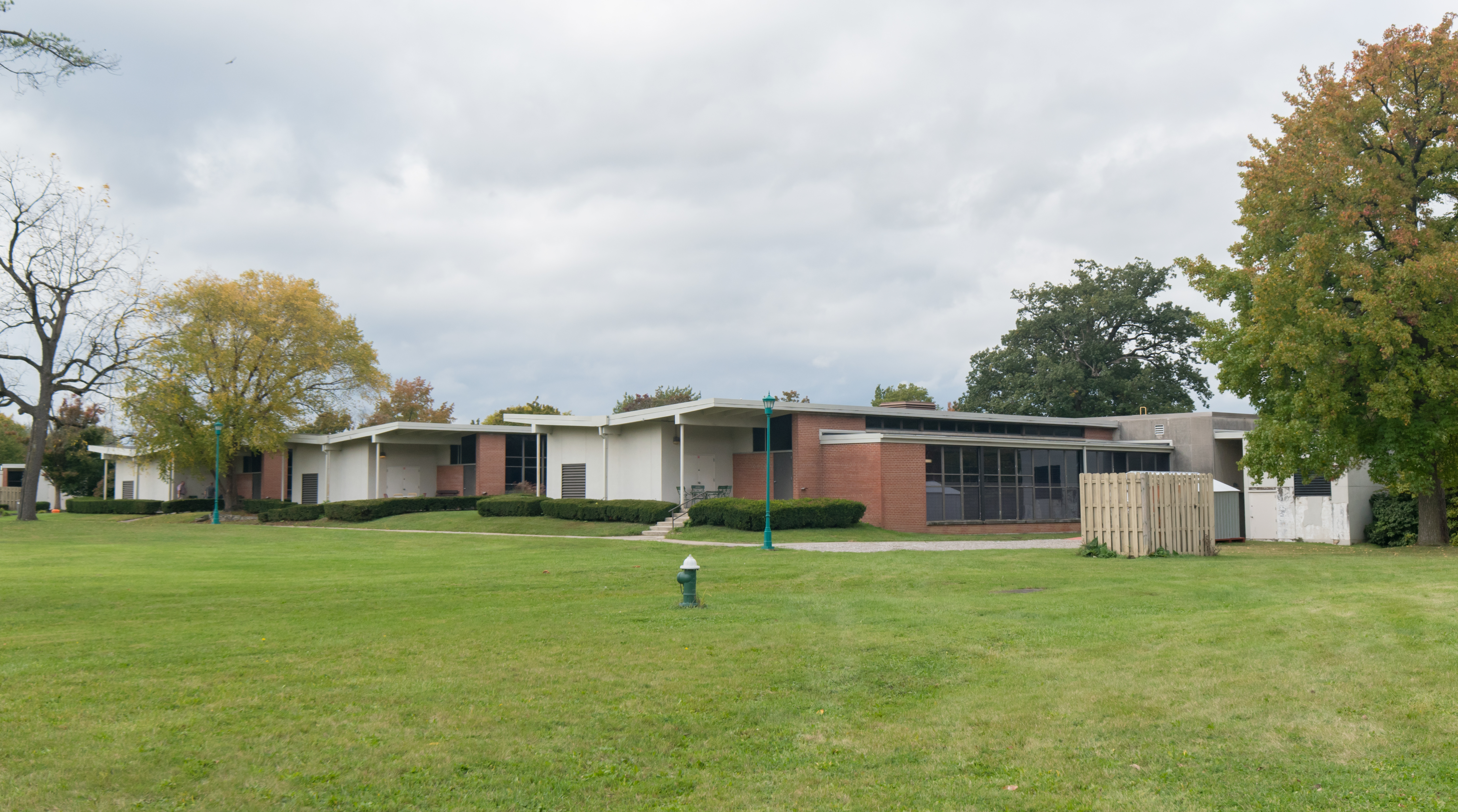
One of several buildings in use

The Columbus Developmental Center is headed by Randon Watson. It serves approximately 100 people, all of whom live on the campus in various housing units. The majority have been diagnosed with "severe" or "profound" challenges. The center provides social and daily living skills, as well as healthcare for the residents.

The school sits on a campus of 92 acres (37 ha) in the Hilltop neighborhood of Columbus, purchased in 1864. Originally the site had 188 acres, 140 of which were cleared for use. The campus is on West Broad Street, approximately two miles from the Ohio Statehouse in Downtown Columbus.

The campus was designed to be visually appealing, originally with an entrance gate, a broad shaded avenue toward the campus buildings, and an expansive park with large old trees. The original main building was large, with two wings symmetrically to the north and south of the center. The central section was asymmetrically-massed. The building had numerous decorative elements, including lancet arched doorways and windows, stone-topped buttresses, turrets, and gables. The original roof was removed and replaced with a simplified version in the late 20th century.

== History ==
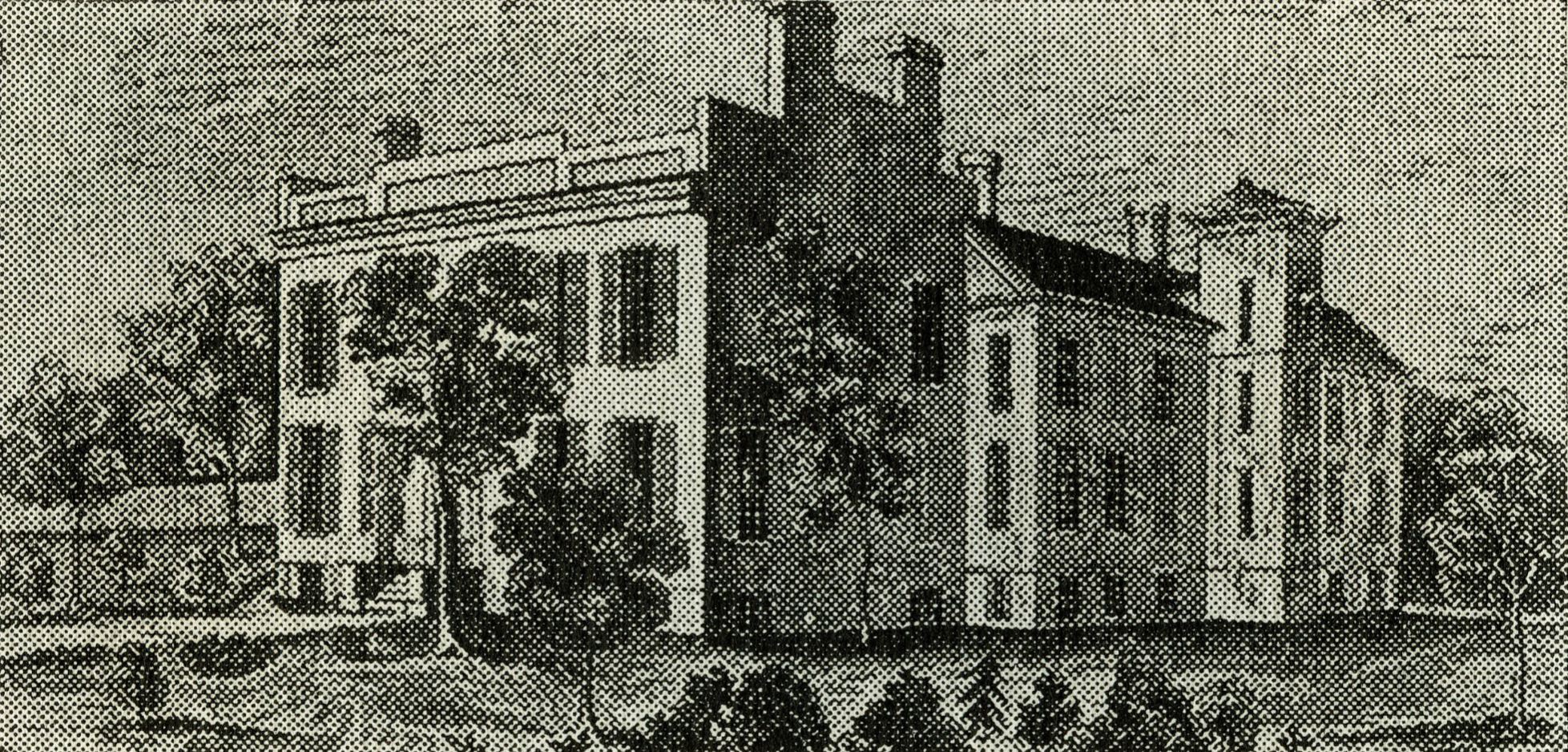
First home, the Neville Mansion

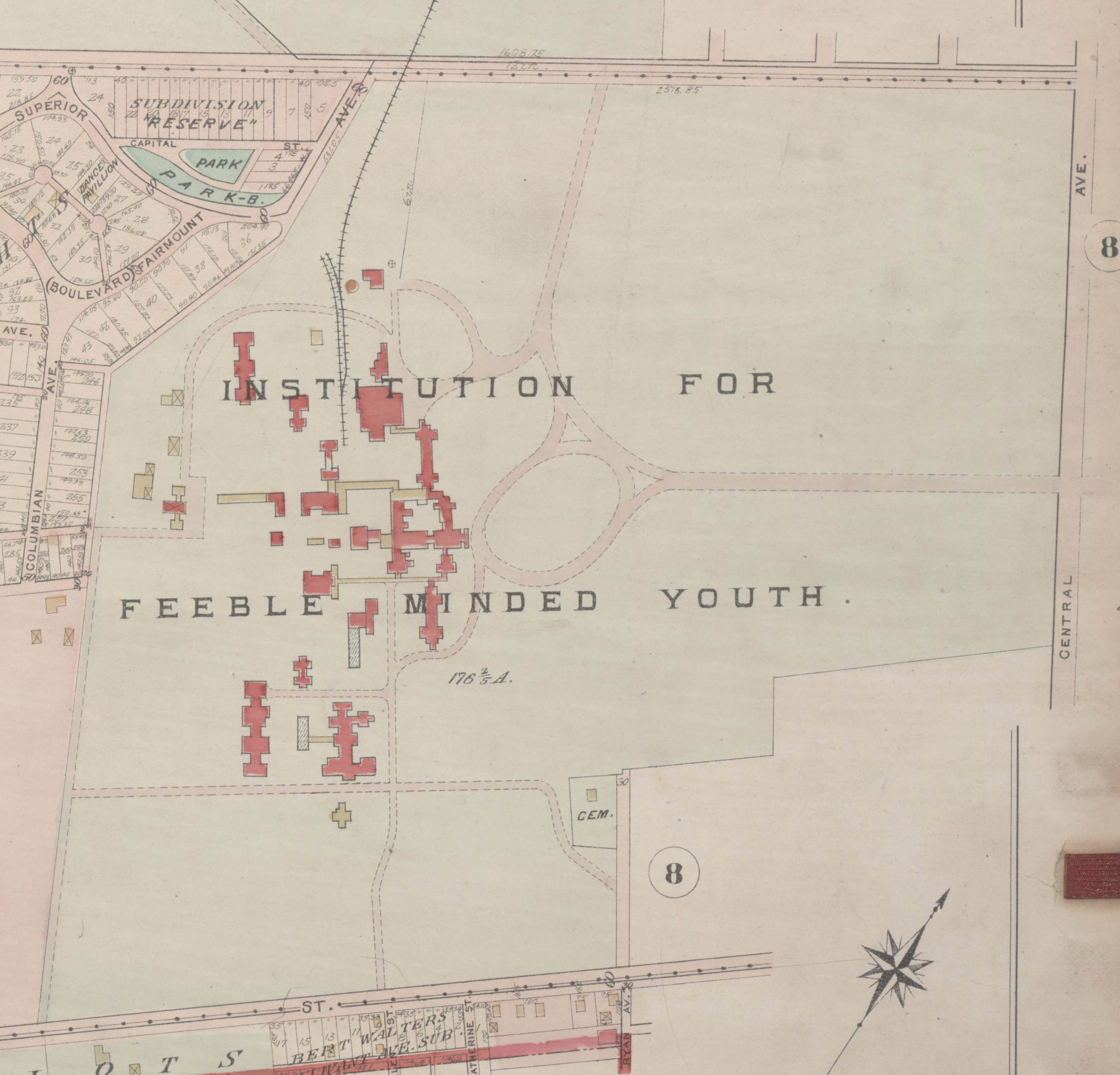
Campus map, 1910

The institution's origin dates to 1850, when a state senator attempted to have a report made of the number of "imbecile youth" in Ohio, and how they could be supported and educated. In 1853, senator-elect Norton Strange Townshend pursued the matter again. He had studied medicine in Paris, and had seen how they cared for developmentally-disabled youth. Townshend asked Ohio governor William Medill what provisions could be made, and Medill responded that you can't teach "fools" anything; Townshend corrected him and explained how other places care for these youth. Medill proceeded to bring the subject up to the state legislature, and Townshend reported on efforts made in Europe and the United States. A bill to establish an institution to support developmentally-disabled youth failed to pass.

In 1856, the New York Imbecile Asylum superintendent gave a lecture and presented two students before the Ohio General Assembly. This helped prompt another bill to establish the institute to support these youth, a bill which became law on April 17, 1857. The school was thus founded in 1857 as the Ohio Asylum for the Education of Idiotic and Imbecile Youth. The act enabled Ohio's governor to appoint three trustees (Townshend, William Dennison Jr., and Asher Cook), who organized a board with Dennison as chairman, Townshend as secretary, and R. J. Patterson as the first superintendent. The four visited similar asylums in Massachusetts and New York, and obtained two teachers from the New York school.

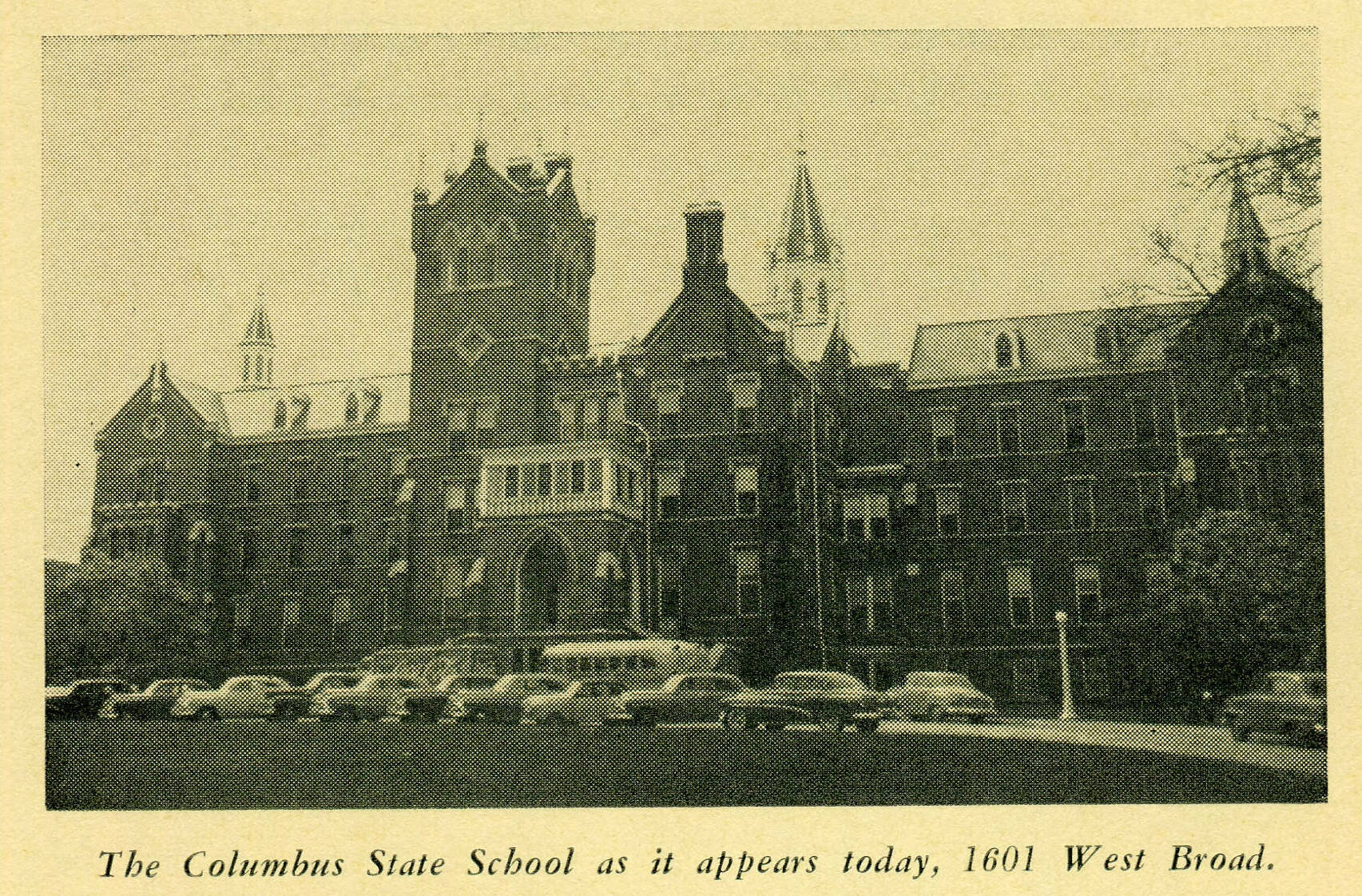
The main building in 1957

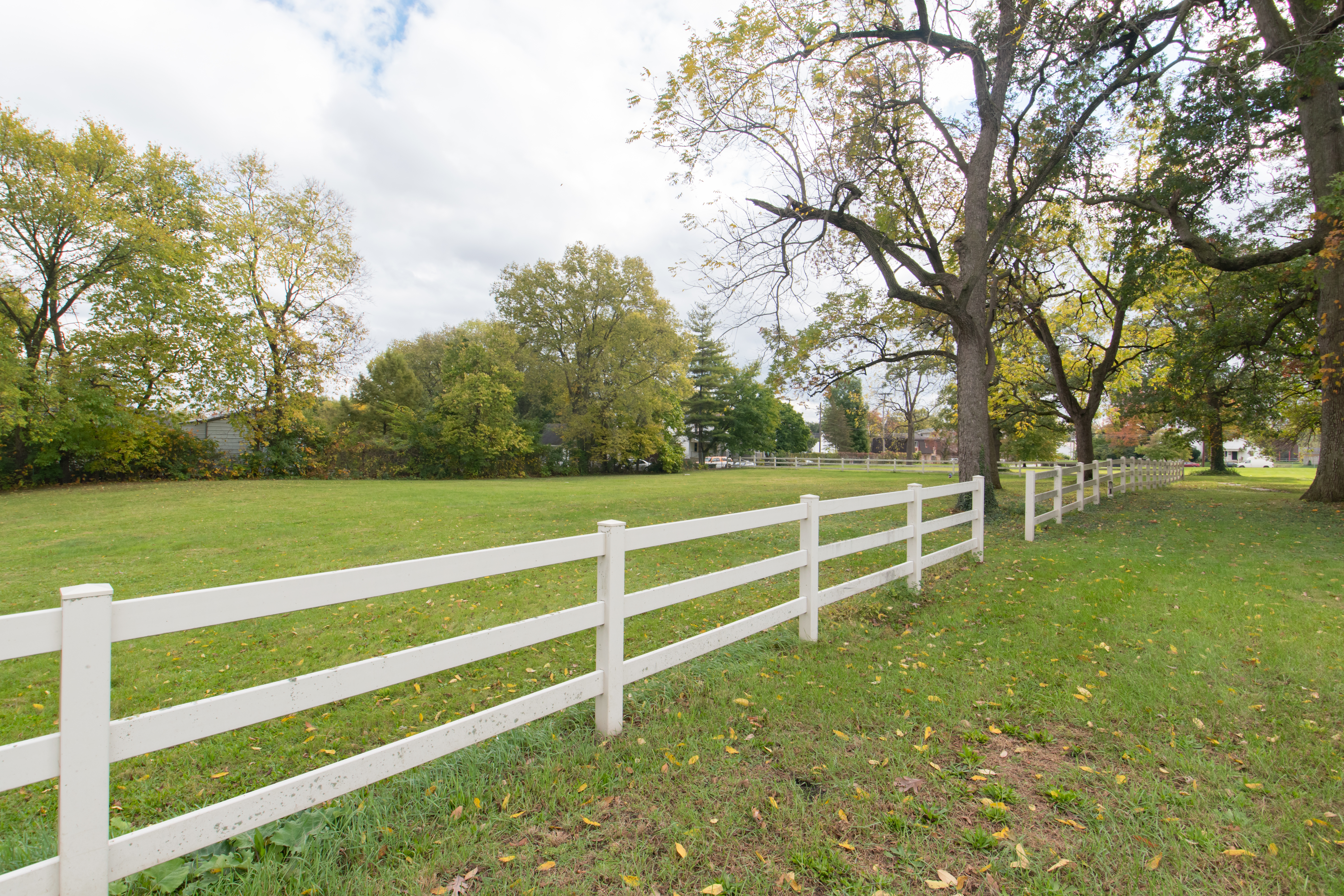
Cemetery on-site

The first nine students arrived on August 3 of that year. Instruction was held in a converted mansion, the Neville Mansion, known for later serving as the Hannah Neil Mission, from 1868 to 1977. The students each represented a single judicial district, and had to be between the ages of 6 and 15. By 1858, the school's population grew to 30. By 1862, the school's resident population grew to 57. The number of applicants increased each year, and the old building could only accommodate about 50 students. In 1864, as the center desired a larger structure to support more students, as well as a location away from the city center, the institute purchased the land it currently occupies. In 1865, the foundation for the new residential school building was started. The institute's main building was completed enough to begin occupancy in July 1868, with 105 students, increased to 300 by the end of the year.

In 1871, the school's name was adjusted to the Ohio Institution for the Education of Idiotic and Imbecile Youth. The campus was built upon gradually, with wings added to the main building in 1876 and 1878, with a heating plant, laundry, workshop, coal house, and hospital also constructed around this time. Construction labor was predominantly sourced from the institute's adult patients. In 1881, the school was renamed the Ohio Institution for Feeble-Minded Youth. At this time, the institute had 614 students. Also in this year, on November 18, the main building was destroyed in a fire, several side wings were severely damaged, and about 20 years of records were lost. A safe evacuation took place, and within three years the buildings had been reconstructed. From 1888 to 1890, buildings were constructed for dining rooms, shops, and kitchens. Another fire damaged the main building in 1895, destroying most of the south wing. The structure was rebuilt and occupied by May 1895.
