= Neville Mansion =

Historic house in Columbus, Ohio

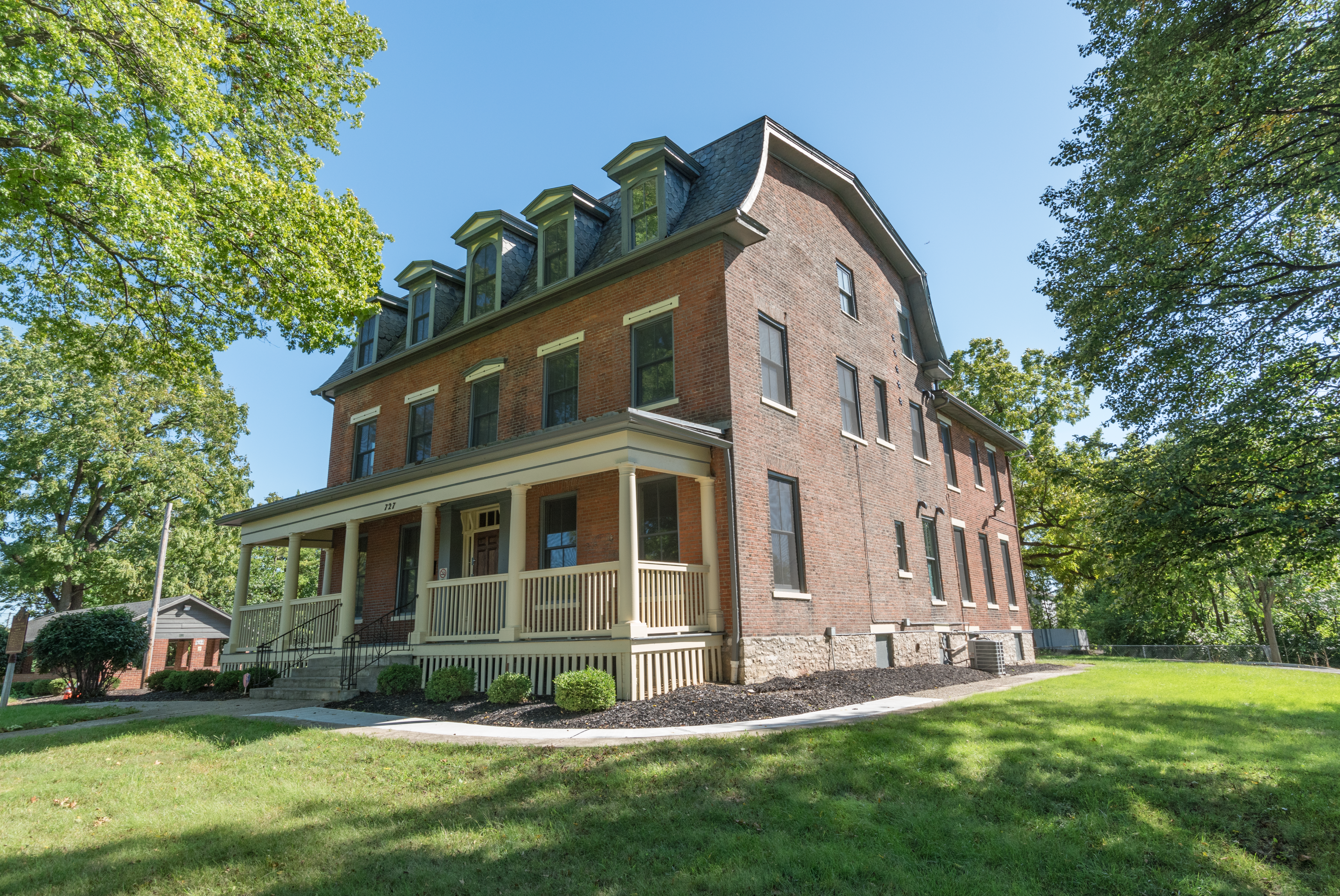
- Location: 727 E. Main St., Columbus, Ohio
- Coordinates: 39.957646°N 82.979976°W
- Built: 1850s
- Architectural styles: Renaissance Revival, French Second Empire

The Neville Mansion is a historic house in the Olde Towne East neighborhood of Columbus, Ohio. Portions of the house may have been built in the early 19th century, though the majority was complete by the mid-1850s. It was built for M.L. Neville, who purchased the property in 1855. Two years later, it became the Ohio Asylum for the Education of Idiotic and Imbecile Youth (known today as the Columbus Developmental Center), which moved out to its current campus in 1868. The mansion then held the Hannah Neil Mission and Home of the Friendless for over a century, from 1868 to 1977. The mission served as an orphanage, homeless shelter, and school for various types of disadvantaged residents throughout its history. After Neil's organization moved out, the mansion was renovated for office use.

In 1983, a marker was placed by the house detailing the Neil Mission's historical importance to the community. The building was deemed eligible for the National Register of Historic Places in 2006.

== Attributes ==
The Neville Mansion is a converted residential building on Main Street near Parsons Avenue in the Olde Towne East neighborhood of Columbus, Ohio. The 2 1/2-story brick structure has a gambrel roof and Renaissance Revival and French Second Empire architecture. The surrounding property is mostly landscaped with large old trees and grass, a traditional design compatible with the house.

== History ==
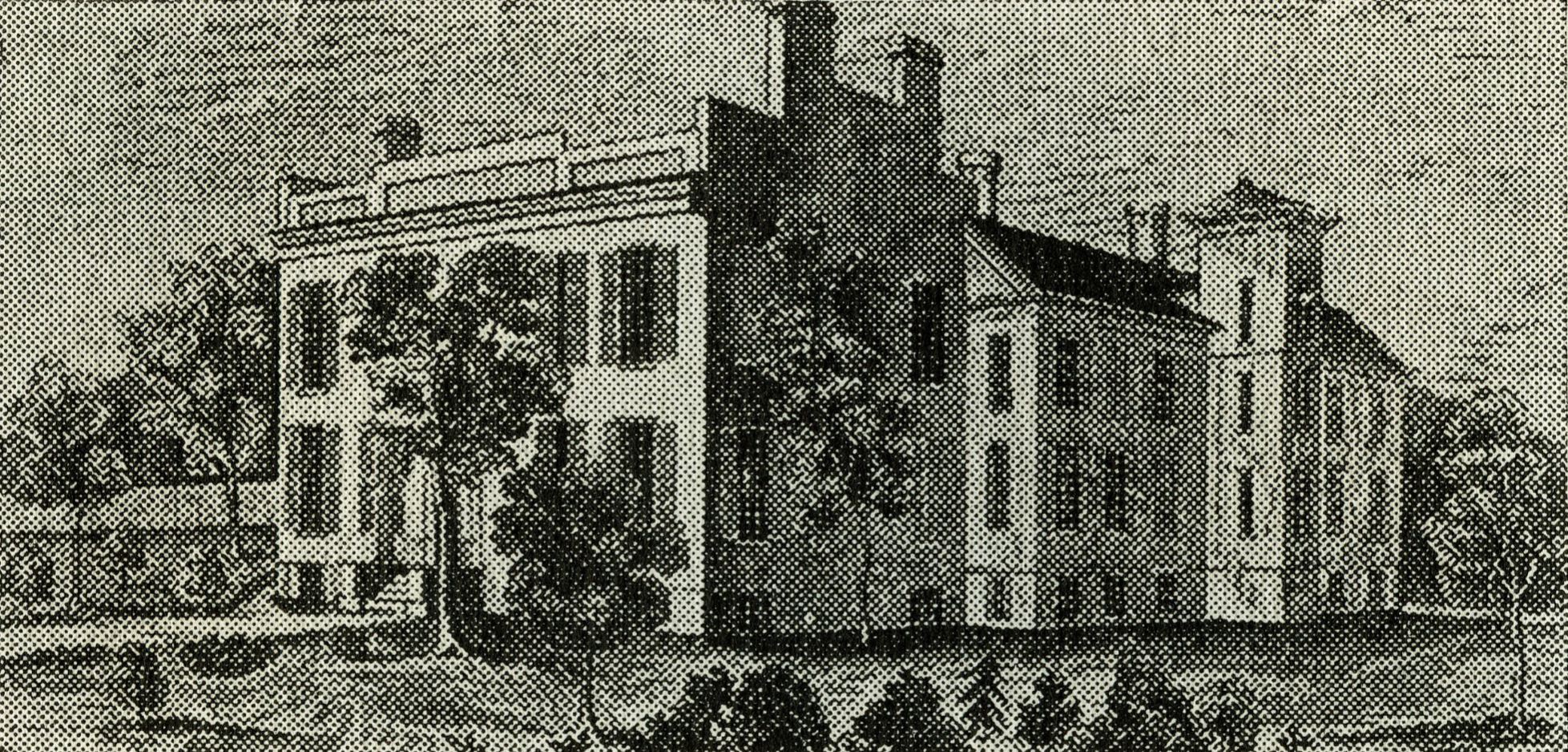
The house c. 1857

The land was part of the Refugee Tract, later sold and partitioned and resold. Part of the mansion potentially dates to prior to 1850. The majority of the mansion was built around the mid-1850s for M.L. Neville, who purchased the property in an 1855 sheriff's sale for $5,310. In 1857, it was rented out to the state of Ohio, when it became the first home to the Ohio Asylum for the Education of Idiotic and Imbecile Youth (known today as the Columbus Developmental Center).

In 1868, the developmental center had acquired its own campus, and the mansion was sold that April to the Hannah Neil Mission and Home of the Friendless for $12,000. Hannah Neil was the wife of William Neil, who owned the Neil House hotel downtown and ran a large farm on the site of the Ohio State University. Hannah Neil's orphanage was founded in April 1858 as the Industrial School Association, as it served to teach poor children the skills needed to build a better life. The organization was renamed in honor of Neil in April 1868, on its tenth anniversary, and about one month after she died. The Neville Mansion acted as the organization's orphanage for temporarily neglected or dependent children for over a century, and replaced a homeless shelter established in 1865. Before occupancy, the house was renovated, with parts using bricks salvaged from the fire that destroyed the first Ohio Statehouse.

Early on, the mission had to tend with the house having no running water or plumbing, and cows were kept nearby for milk. In the first five months, the shelter admitted 62 people, 40 of which were under 12 years old. These residents stayed only until permanent homes or employment were secured for them. The mansion also served as an emergency shelter for those experiencing a tragedy or disaster.

The Neil Mission helped found other charities, and as other social services developed in the city, the organization shifted duties. In 1880, a home for children of the poor was established. The mansion was extensively remodeled, and reopened in 1883 to serve women of all ages, boys up to 15, girls in need of rest or training for domestic service, "crippled children, transients", and others. In 1886, a home for the aged was established at 1776 E. Broad St., though only one of many elderly women living at the Neil Mission chose to move.

In the 1970s, it housed children six through twelve, with a capacity for 32 occupants. The organization moved out into a larger facility on Obetz Road in 1977, finding the old mansion to be too worn and small. When the Hannah Neil Mission moved out, the building was converted to hold offices; the Ohio Arts Council office was there from 1983 to 2010.

A historical marker was placed at the site in 1983, identifying the house's role in helping children and families as the Neil Mission for 109 years. The Ohio Historic Preservation Office deemed the house eligible for the National Register of Historic Places in 2006, as an important social institution, for its association with Hannah Neil, and for its 1880s residential design with elements of Renaissance Revival and French Second Empire architecture.

== See also ==
- Social services and homelessness in Columbus, Ohio
