= W.H. Jones Mansion =

- U.S. National Register of Historic Places
- Columbus Register of Historic Properties
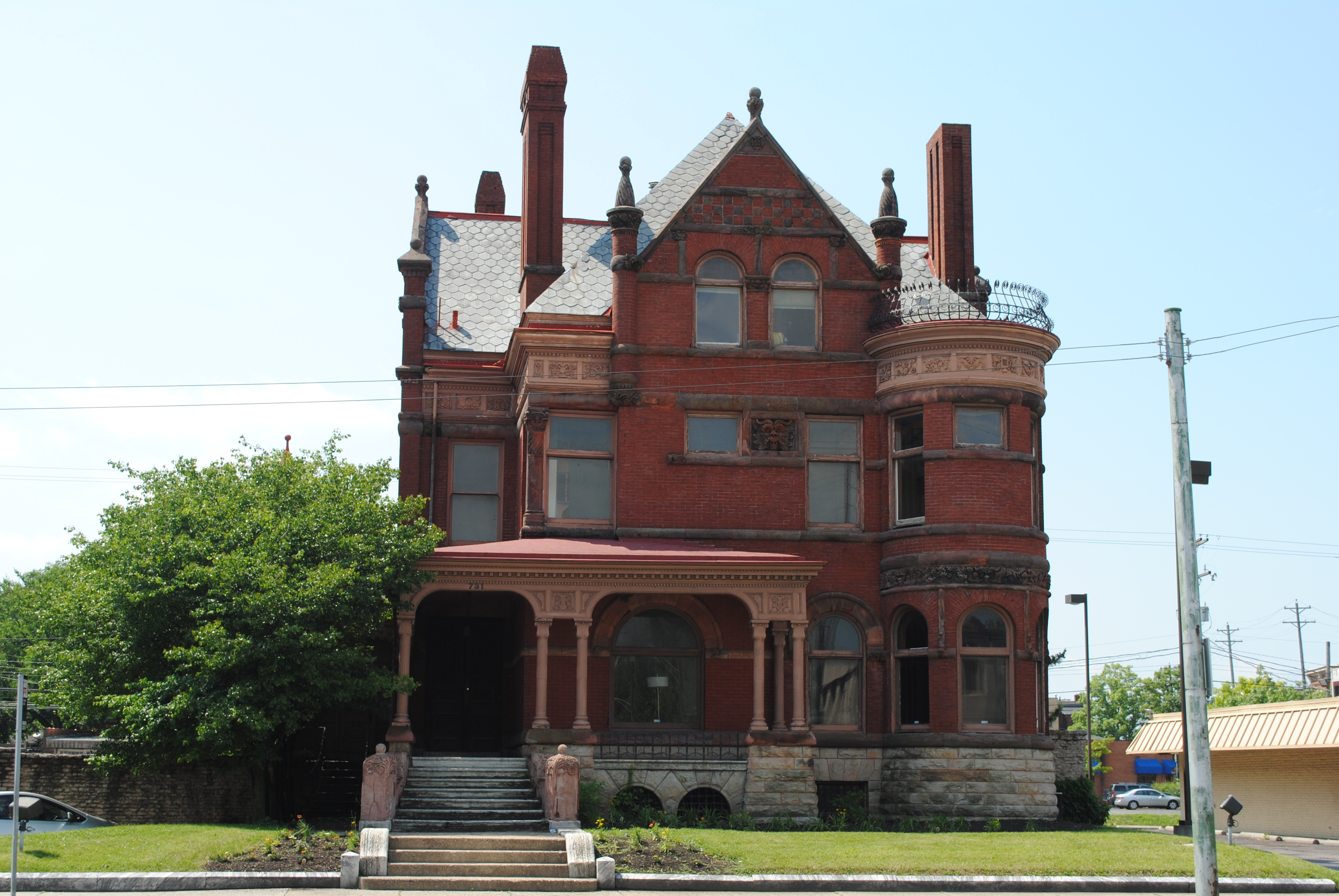
- Interactive map highlighting the building's location
- Location: 731 E. Broad St., Columbus, Ohio
- Coordinates: 39°57′50.975″N 82°58′51.735″W
- Built: 1889
- NRHP reference No.: 78002065
- CRHP No.: CR-29

Significant dates
- Added to NRHP: October 2, 1978
- Designated CRHP: May 14, 1984

The W. H. Jones Mansion was built in 1889 at 731 East Broad Street, Columbus, Ohio as the residence of dry goods store owner William H. Jones and his wife Josephine. The original cost to build it was $11,250. He lived there until 1923. Jones modelled the house after another mansion in Barnesville, Ohio. The Olde Towne East Neighborhood Association successfully prevented it from being demolished to make way for a Long John Silver's restaurant. The home is an example of Queen Anne style architecture, with a corner turret, third story ballroom and a carriage house in the rear. Its foundation is high ashlar stone, its roof is slate, and the main body of the building is made of red pressed brick.

Since the Jones' occupancy, the building has also been home to a doctor's office as well as the Schorr-Ketner Furniture Company. The mansion was previously leased to community advocate Local Matters. The site is now home to the alternative school Columbus Learning Cooperative, a local alternative to traditional education. They serve students ages 10 to 18, providing resources for the self-directed education model.

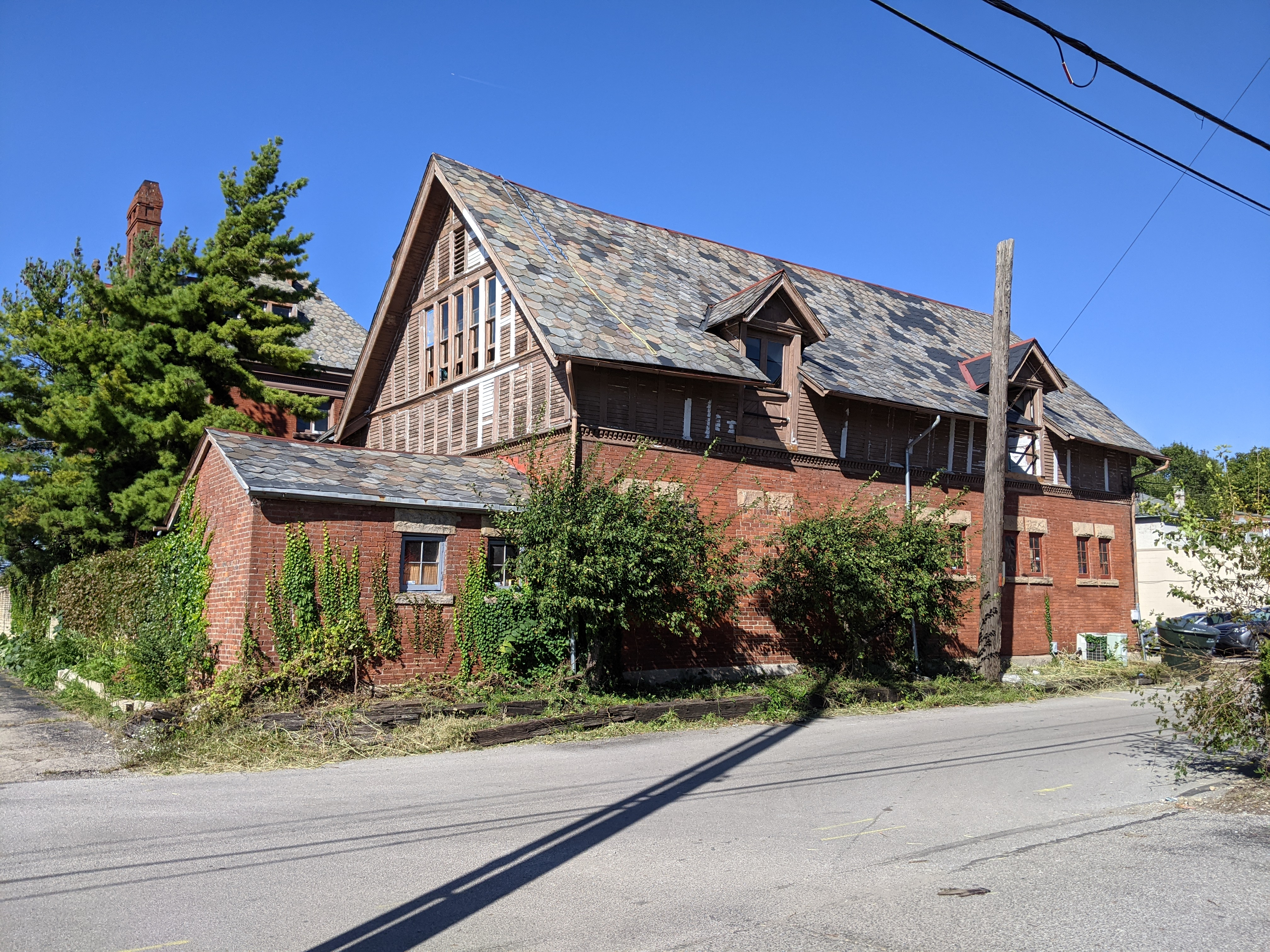
The mansion's carriage house, viewed from Capital Street

== See also ==
- National Register of Historic Places listings in Columbus, Ohio
