= East Broad Street Commercial Building =

- U.S. National Register of Historic Places
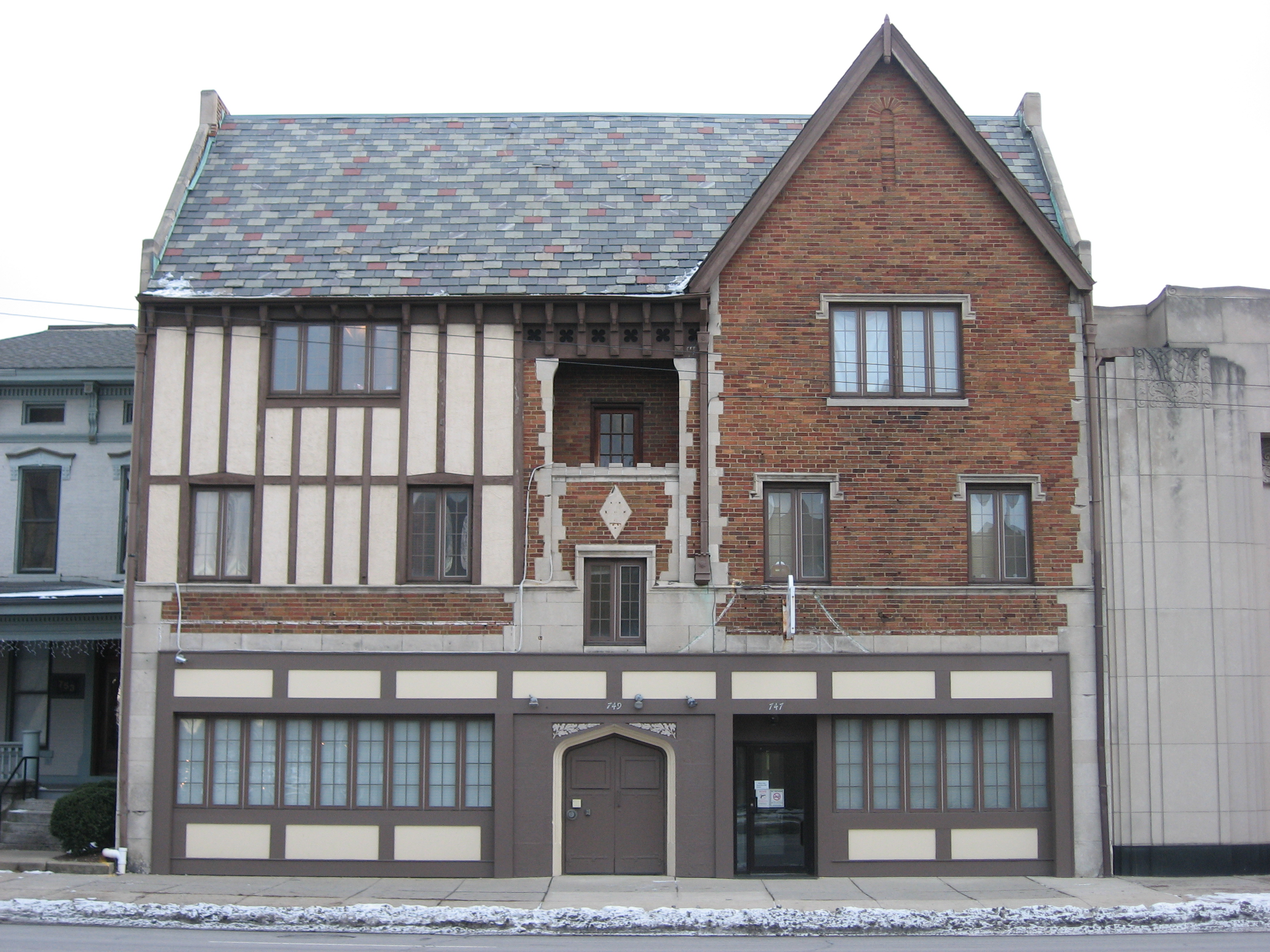
- Exterior in 2010
- Interactive map highlighting the building's location
- Location: 747, 749, 751 E. Broad St., Columbus, Ohio
- Coordinates: 39.964263°N 82.980608°W
- Built: 1930
- Architectural style: Jacobethan
- MPS: East Broad Street MRA
- NRHP reference No.: 86003421
- Added to NRHP: December 19, 1986

The East Broad Street Commercial Building is a historic building in Columbus, Ohio. It was built in 1930 and listed as part of the E. Broad St. Multiple Resources Area on the National Register of Historic Places in 1986. The building has served numerous businesses, including doctor's offices, insurance agencies, and a Kroger store (1930-1946). Chinese restaurants operated out of the building from 1930 to 1995: Golden Lotus from 1930 to 1950 and Jong Mea from 1950 to 1995.

The East Broad Street Commercial Building exemplifies Jacobethan Revival structure. It is primarily constructed of brick on a concrete foundation. The gabled wood is made of slate.

== See also ==
- National Register of Historic Places listings in Columbus, Ohio
