= Hausfrau Haven =

- U.S. Historic district – Contributing property
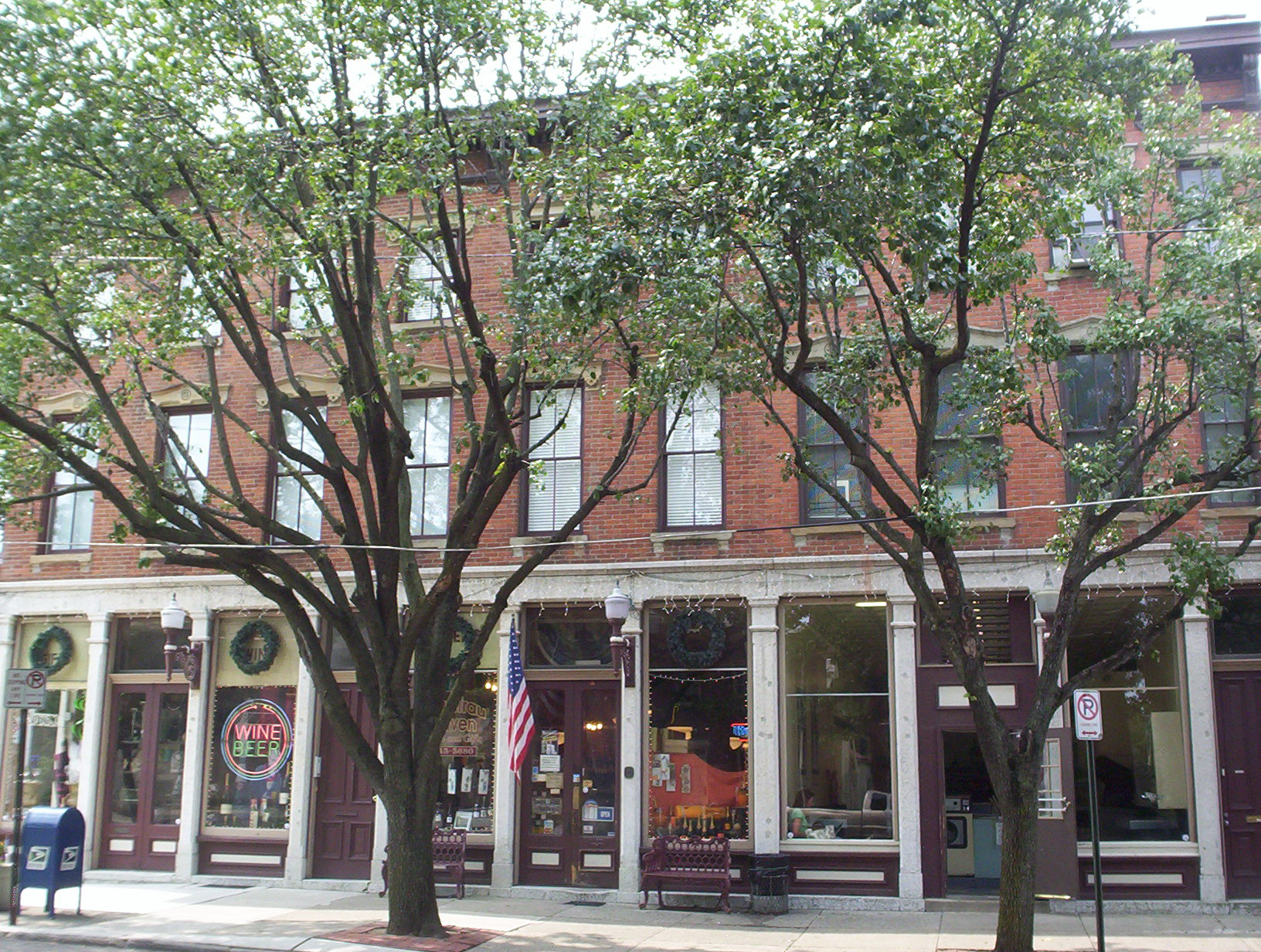
- The wine shop adjacent to a laundromat, 2008
- Interactive map of Hausfrau Haven
- Location: 769 S. Third Street, Columbus, Ohio
- Coordinates: 39.94668°N 82.99516°W
- Built: c. 1890
- Website: www.hausfrauhaven.com
- Part of: German Village

Hausfrau Haven is a wine shop in the German Village neighborhood of Columbus, Ohio. The store makes up the ground floor of 769 South Third Street, a contributing property to the German Village historic district, listed by the city and on the National Register of Historic Places.

The building's earliest history is unknown. The oldest photograph dates to c. 1890, showing a "sample room", saloon, and a grocery or hardware store in the building. The second floor appears to have always been used for apartments. In the 1950s, a portion of the building held a grocery store operated by Adam Sauer. After a few years, Tony Shumick moved his own grocery into the building. In the mid-1970s, partners Fred Holdridge and Howard Burns established Hausfrau Haven, then a small market. The two stocked any items two or more customers would ask for; wine and The New York Times were especially popular. The store operated every day except January 1, when community members and customers would help them take inventory. The store was also noted for its witty signs, including those reading "Unattended children will be sold!" and "We will not be taken over by The Limited!".

Over several decades, Fred became occupied with more civic roles, especially with the German Village Society. Howard and his mother predominantly operated the store counter at this time. Howard died in 2001; Fred sold the store five years later, in an agreement that he could live above it until his death (he passed in 2010). In the present day, the store's owners continue to run the shop in a similar manner to Fred and Howard. In 2014 the German Village Society dedicated a plaque commemorating the achievements of Fred and Howard; the plaque is attached to the southeast corner of the building.

== See also ==
- National Register of Historic Places listings in Columbus, Ohio
