= German Village =

Historic neighborhood in Columbus, Ohio, U.S.

- U.S. Historic district
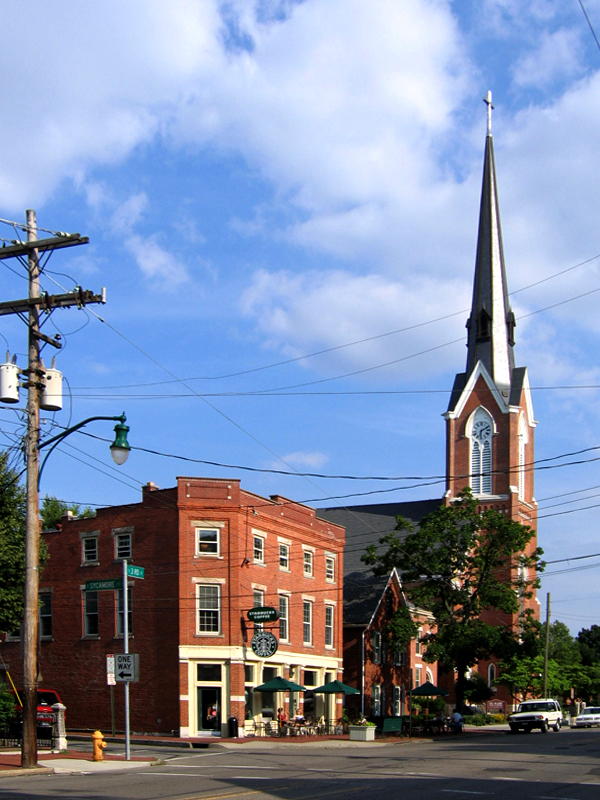
- S. 3rd Street in German Village
- Interactive map of the neighborhood
- Location: Columbus, Ohio
- Coordinates: 39°56′45″N 82°59′34″W
- Built: 1820
- Architectural style: Italianate
- NRHP reference No.: #74001490 , #80002998

Significant dates
- Added to NRHP: December 30, 1974
- Boundary increase: November 28, 1980

German Village is a historic neighborhood in Columbus, Ohio, just south of the city's downtown. It was settled in the early-to-mid-19th century by a large number of German immigrants, who at one time comprised as much as a third of the city's entire population. It became a city historic district in 1960 and was added to the National Register of Historic Places in 1974, becoming the list's largest privately funded preservation district. Its boundaries increased in 1980, and in 2007, it was designated a Preserve America Community by the federal government. Today it is one of the world's premier historic restorations.

== History ==
=== Early ===
In 1796, Congress appropriated the Refugee Lands for Canadian province individuals who had supported the Colonial cause in the American Revolution. By 1802, an American Revolution veteran named John McGowan claimed 328 acres (1.33 km^{2}), most of what would become the German Village. As German immigrants arrived, McGowan sold tracts of land to them. By 1814, a settlement had grown up, originally called "Das Alte Südende" (the Old South End), and German immigrants contributed to building the first statehouse.

==== Immigration ====
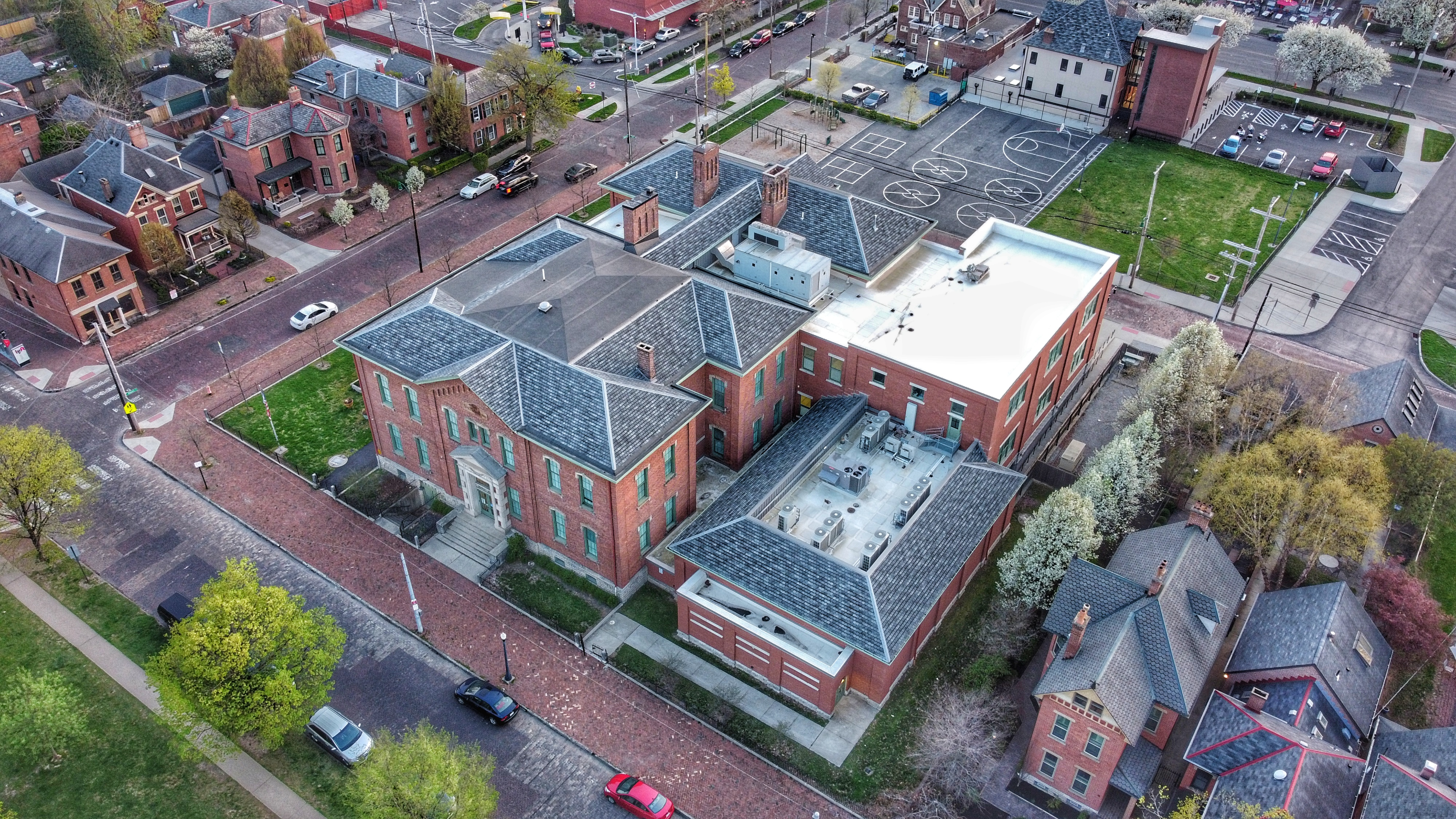
Stewart Elementary School, built in 1874

By 1830, massive German immigration to the city had occurred. The most influential German newspaper in 1843 was Der Westbote. Many immigrants from Germany would serve in the American Civil War, thus gaining the universal respect of the local citizens. By 1865, one-third of Columbus's population was German and the community was flourishing. They built up the local neighborhood, including many businesses such as Hessenauer Jewelers and Lazarus. The Ohio-historic St. Mary's Catholic Church was built in 1865 and adorned with a 197-foot (60 m) steeple in 1893. German-American George J. Karb became mayor of the city, twice, at the end of the 19th century and again in the early 20th century.

During the early 20th century, the south end saw newcomers from eastern Europe aside from German immigrants, resulting in brother neighborhoods such as Hungarian Village.

The local schools the German immigrants constructed and managed were so superior that English-speaking residents of Columbus chose to attend them, such as one that once stood at Fulton Street east of South Fourth Street.

==== World War I ====
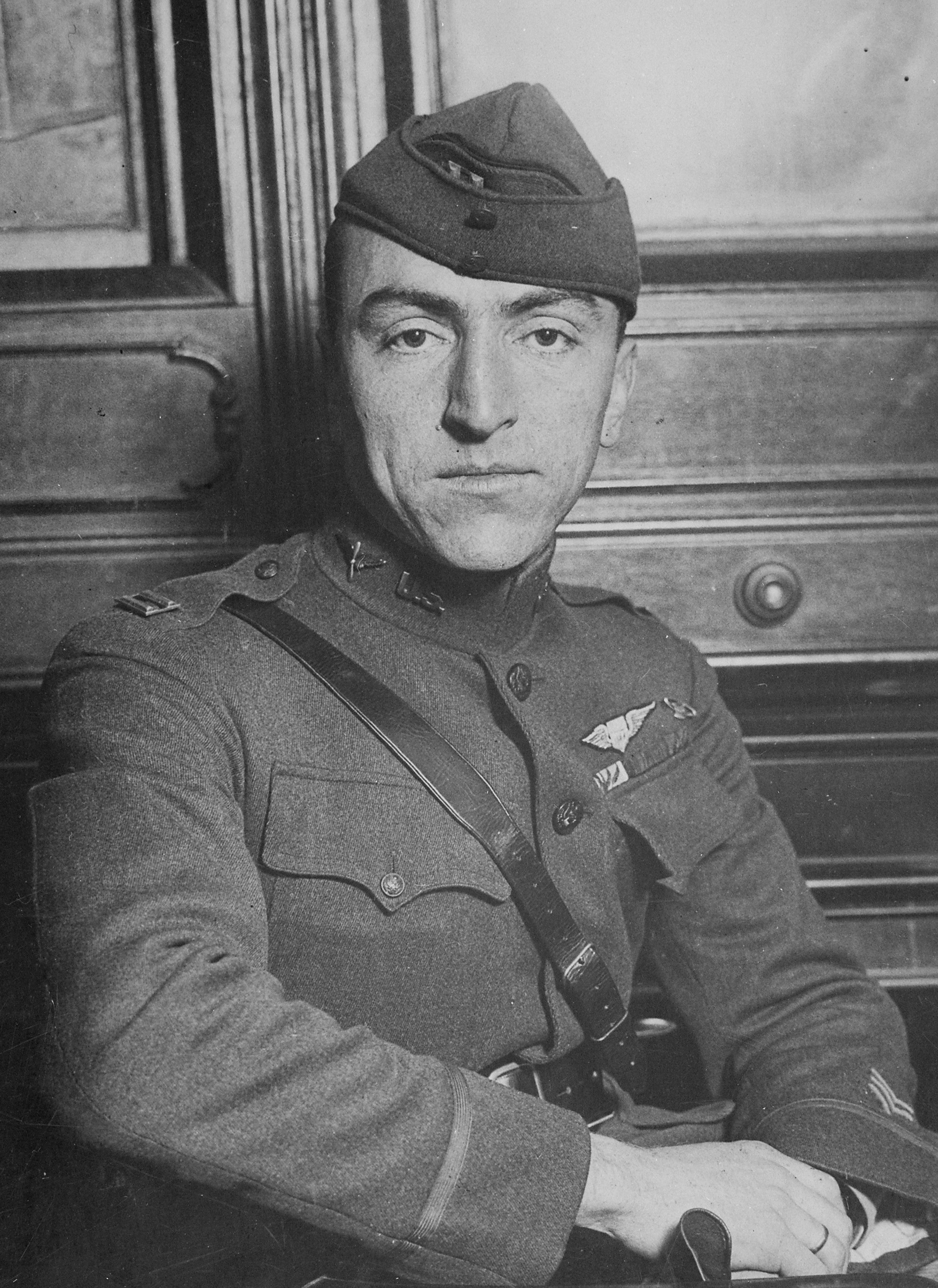
Capt. Eddie Rickenbacker, a World War I hero from the Columbus German-American community

The area was in serious decline throughout the first half of the 20th century, partly due to anti-German sentiment during World War I. During that time, the teaching of German in public schools was banned and German textbooks were burned. German street names were changed, such as Germania Street becoming the present-day Stewart Avenue, and Schiller Park was temporarily renamed Washington Park. The anti-German sentiment fueled by the media was so bad that in 1918, German books were burned on Broad Street and at the foot of the Schiller statue. German canine breeds were taken from their owners and slaughtered before being thrown into a pit in Schiller Park, including Dachshunds. Despite the hatred, the Columbus German American community would produce one of America's finest heroes from the war, Captain Eddie Rickenbacker, for whom Rickenbacker International Airport in southern Columbus is named.

==== Declared Slum ====
Further decline occurred later due to the closing of the local breweries during Prohibition. After the war, the south end was zoned for manufacturing, leading to the erosion of the area's residential feel. During World War II, the neighborhood's streetcar tracks and wrought-iron fences were confiscated for the war effort. By the 1950s, the area had become a slum and the city decided to demolish one-third of the neighborhood. The portion demolished was to become part of the co-located portion of interstates 70 and 71, now known as The Split.

=== Renewal ===
==== Frank Fetch ====
With the Village nearing complete destruction, Frank Fetch defied the common wisdom and purchased a house on South Wall Street, determined to rebuild the neighborhood. Fetch would create the German Village Society. In June 1960, the society hosted the first Haus und Garten Tour, which attracted visitors and the local media to eight restored homes and two gardens. Today, the tour is one of the city's most popular events. Frank Fetch Park was named after him.

==== Historic preservation ====
Concerned citizens managed to save its historic architecture from demolition in the 1960s by lobbying for a local commission, the German Village Commission, to have power over external changes made to buildings and by getting the area listed on the National Register of Historic Places in 1975. As of 2009, the German Village Society has over 1,000 preservationists who maintain the historic quality of the buildings and neighborhood, and German Village is considered one of the most desirable areas to live in the city. More than 1,600 buildings have been restored since 1960 and it is credited as one of the world's premier restoration districts. By the 1980s, the restoration was nearly complete. Today, it is the largest privately funded historic district on the National Register of Historic Places.

=== Modern ===
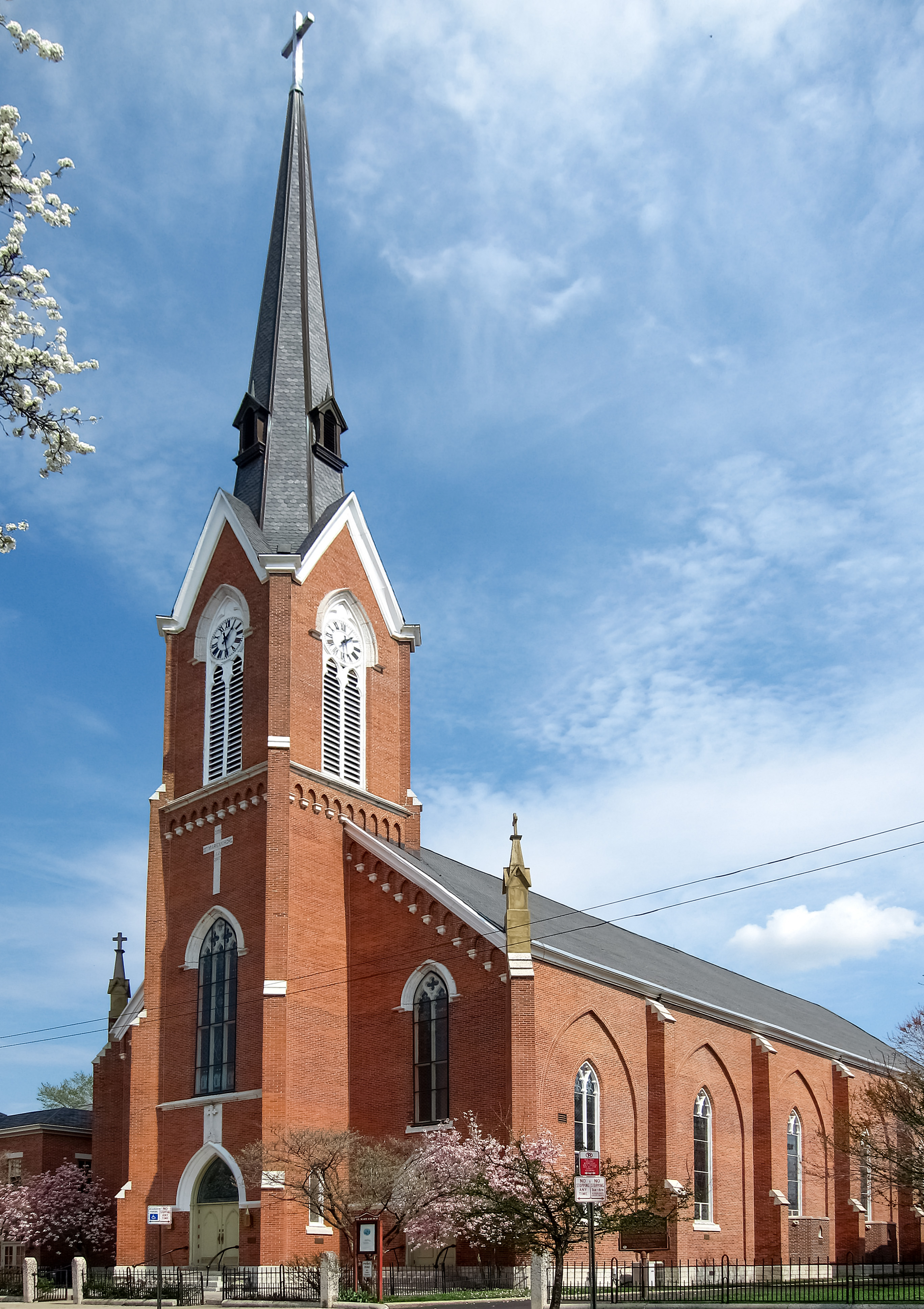
Saint Mary of the Assumption Catholic Church

The area is mostly a residential neighborhood of sturdy, red-brick homes with wrought iron fences along tree-lined, brick-paved streets.

The German Village Guest House has been recognized as one of the best in the Midwest by the New York Post, The Plain Dealer, and the St. Louis Post Dispatch, and positively reviewed by The Washington Post and The Tennessean. It was rated as the "Best Columbus Hotel 2010" by City Search.

==== Oktoberfest ====
German tradition has long reigned in the community in the form of an annual Oktoberfest festival. It originally took place in Schiller Park and has been held at various locations within the German Village neighborhood. Due to new development in the area, it now takes place at the Ohio Expo Center and State Fairgrounds. The festival was to be canceled in 2009, but the Schmidt (owners and operators of Schmidt's Sausage Haus) and Cox families stepped in to keep it running. A smaller Oktoberfest still goes on in German Village itself, at the Germania Gesang und Sport Verein (Singing and Sports Club) at 543 South Front Street in the old Schlee Brewmaster's House and outdoor garden.

==== LGBTQ+ Community ====
Although German Village is an eclectic community, the area is known as a residential gay village. While there are no gay establishments within German Village, the neighboring Brewery District and Merion Village have several.

== Geography ==
=== Boundaries ===
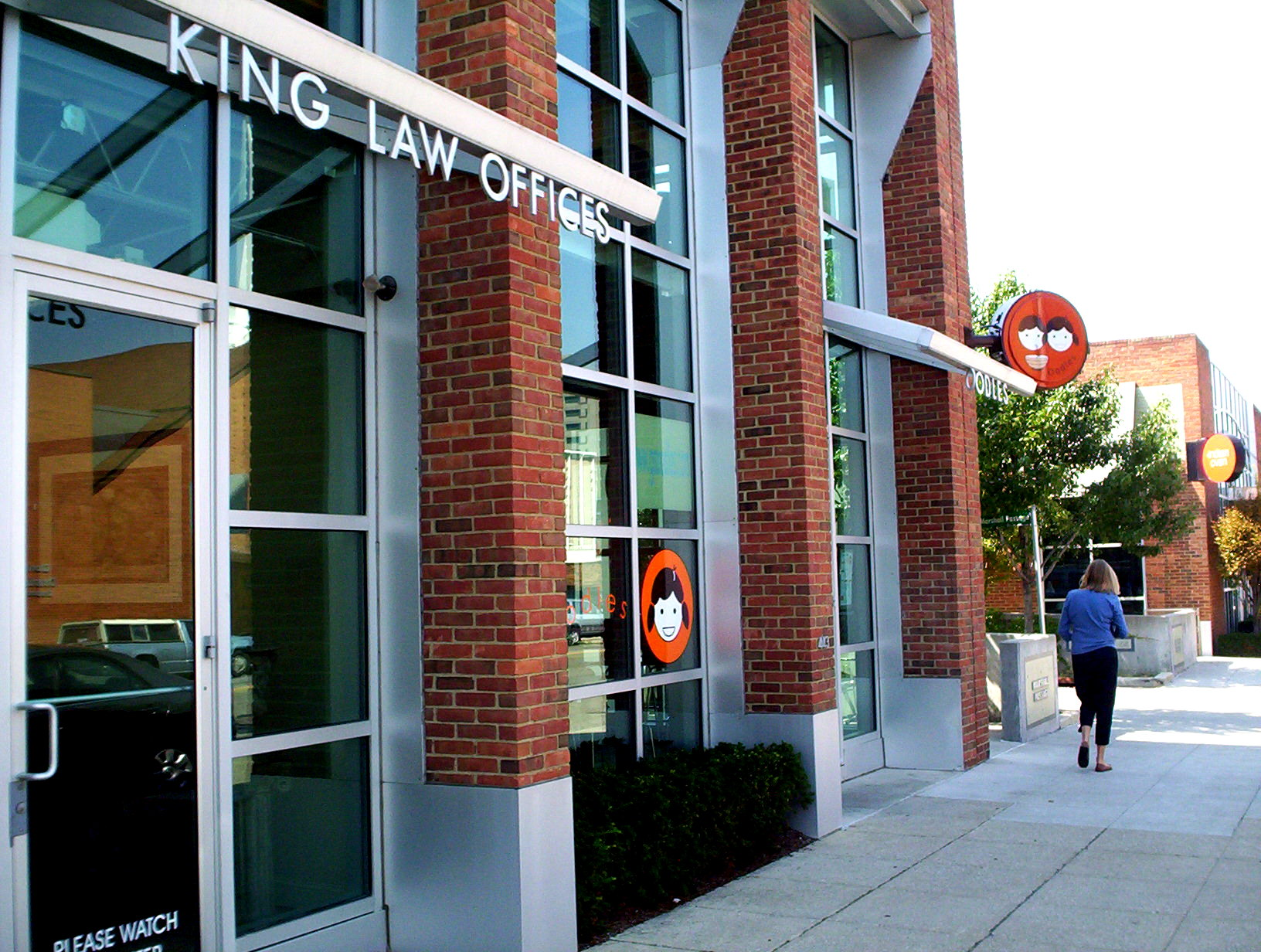
Much of the area in present-day south downtown along I-70 was at one point considered part of German Village, including the Market Exchange District, which has experienced a revival alongside German Village.

German Village is bound by Pearl Street on the west; East Livingston Avenue on the north; Lathrop Street, Brust Street, Grant Avenue, Jaeger Street, and Blackberry Alley on the east; and Nursery Lane on the south.

=== Parks and landmarks ===
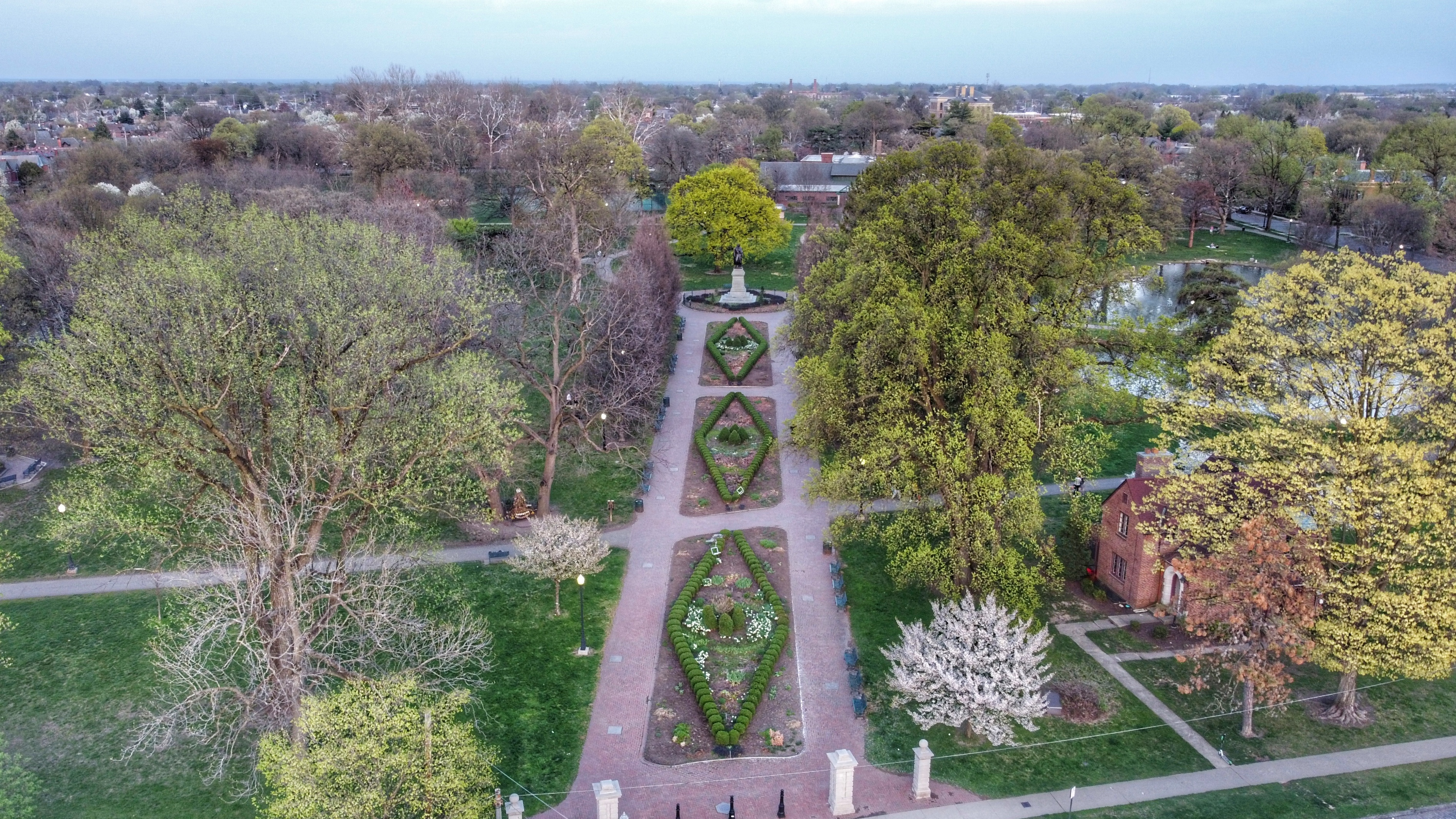
Schiller Park

Schiller Park, named after Johann Christoph Friedrich von Schiller (1759-1805), was once a community meeting ground for German immigrants. It is now the site of recreational facilities, gardens, and an amphitheater that hosts free live performances of Shakespearean plays during the summer months courtesy of Actors' Theatre of Columbus. It is bounded by Jaeger Street and City Park, Reinhard, and Deshler Avenues. It has been the area's center for festivals and neighborhood activities since the 1800s.

The 23-acre park's main entrance, along City Park Avenue, greets visitors with the Huntington Gardens, sponsored by Huntington National Bank and maintained by volunteers, and the Schiller statue. The statue was presented to the park by local residents in 1891. It is a second casting of the statue in Munich, Germany, designed and executed by Max von Widnmann and unveiled on May 9, 1863. The Columbus statue was transported free of charge across the Atlantic. The park is also home to Umbrella Girl, dedicated to the citizens of German Village in October 1996 to replace the missing original sculpture.

The neighborhood's Stewart Alternative Elementary School, was built in 1874. It is one of the oldest remaining school buildings in Columbus, built at the same time as the First and Second Avenue Schools, also still extant.

=== Residential ===
The houses of German Village are settled close together on narrow plots. The area was originally settled mostly residential with commercial buildings scattered throughout. To keep this highly residential feel, the German Village Society has the area rezoned from manufacturing and commercial to high-density residential. The houses have small or no front yards, emphasizing local parks and gardens. The average sales price in 2024 was $668,948.

== Commerce ==
=== Restaurants and bars ===
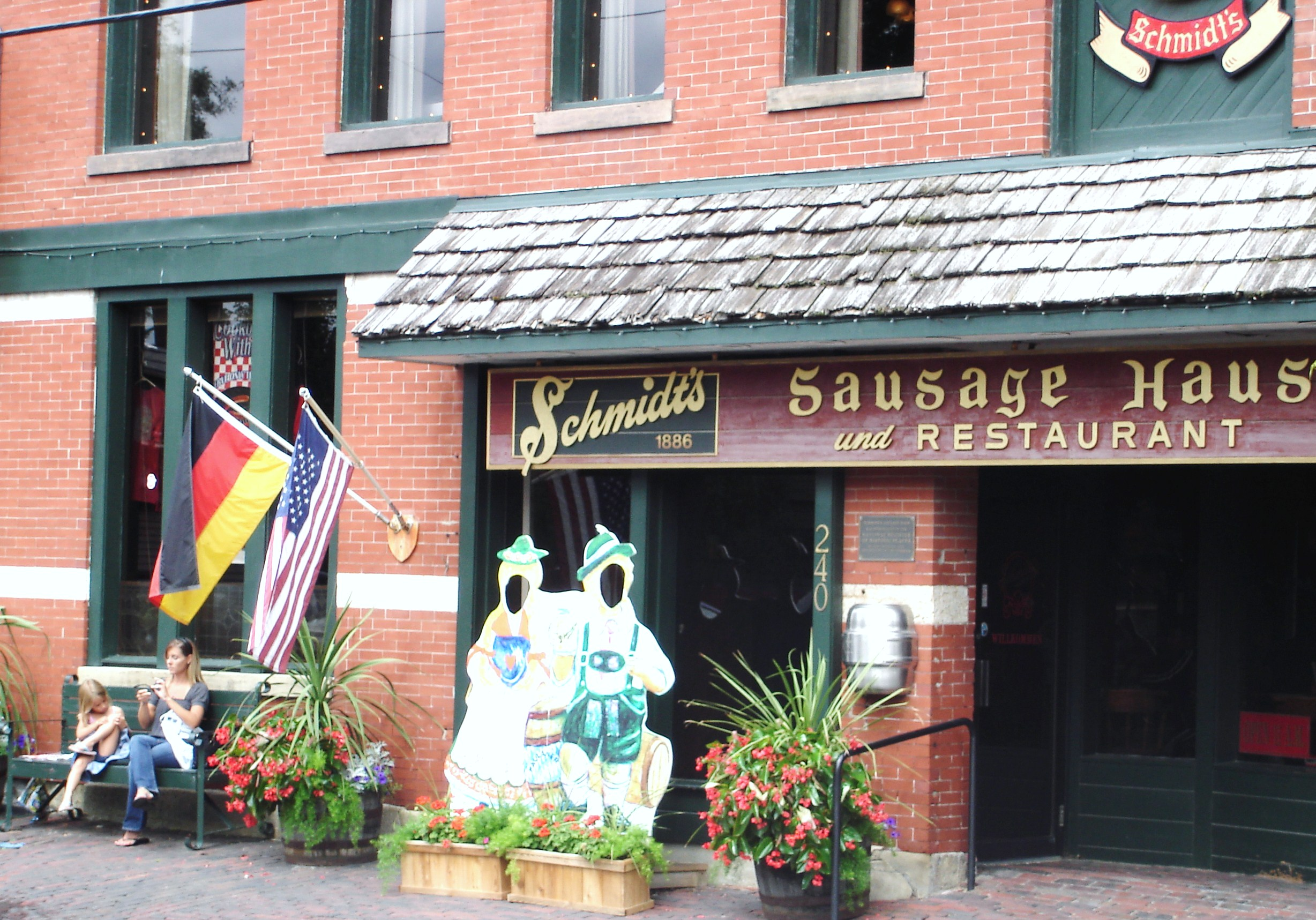
U.S Senators John McCain and Lindsey Graham were guests at Schmidt's Sausage Haus during the 2008 U.S. Presidential campaign, while in 1994, former U.S. President Bill Clinton visited nearby Katzinger's Delicatessen, where a sandwich is named in his honor (a corned beef with Swiss cheese and spicy mustard on pumpernickel) called "President Bill's Day at the Deli."

German Village has a commercial strip mainly centered along S. Third Street, with mostly locally owned restaurants such as Katzinger's Delicatessen, Schmidt's Sausage Haus, and Schmidt's Fudge Haus. The Schmidt's establishments have been a part of German Village for 120 years, opened by George F. Schmidt. The restaurant is still run by the family, and was featured on Man vs. Food in 2008. Thurman Café—home to the "Thurmanator" eating challenge—was opened in German Village in 1942 by Nick Suclescy. The café and its Thurmanator challenge was featured on Man vs. Food in 2008. Katzinger's Delicatessen is another family owned restaurant that opened in 1984 and is known for their deli sandwiches.

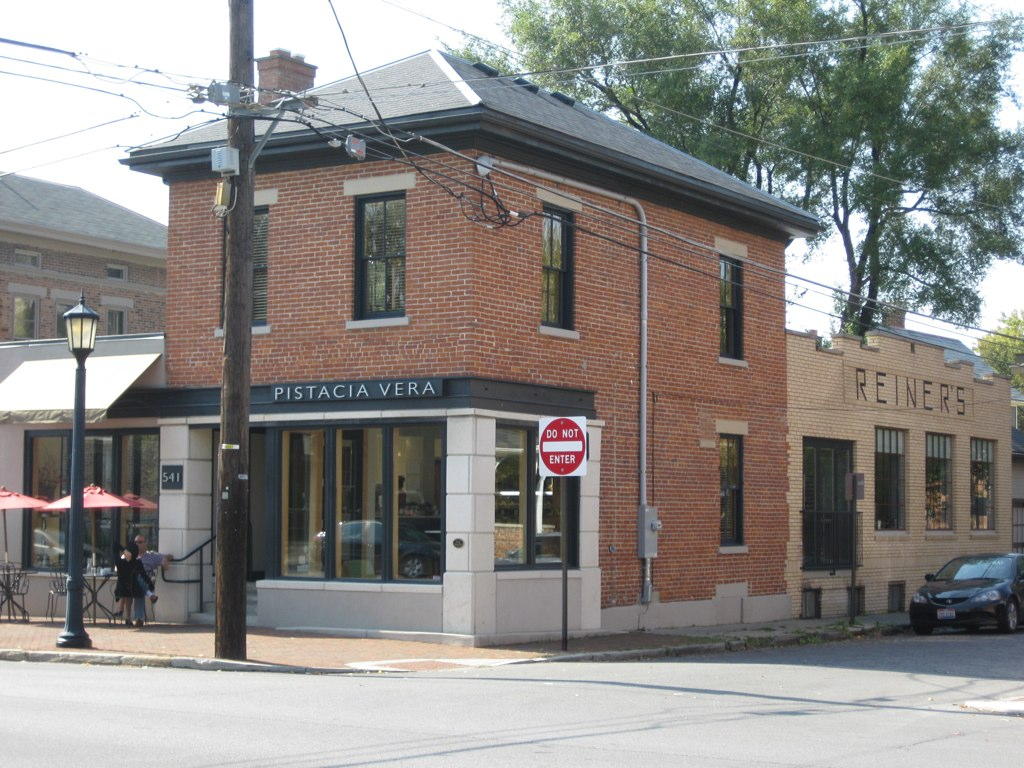
Pistacia Vera, a bakery and café in German Village

German Village was the home of the first restaurant in the Max & Erma's chain. In 1972, the restaurant was opened by Barry Zacks. The name was adopted from the original tavern, started in 1958 by Max and Erma Visocnik, which the new owners converted into the popular theme restaurant. The location closed in 2017 due to financial difficulties.

Many of the neighborhood's restaurants won 2010 ThisWeek Community Papers awards, including Skillet which won "Best New Restaurant", and Thurman Café for "Best Burgers". Barcelona, noted for its Spanish cuisine, won for Best Patio and is a consistent Columbus Dispatch best city restaurant. Lindey's was runner-up for the same award that year and was voted one of Columbus's top 10 restaurants for 18 years straight. It has appeared previously in The New York Times, The Washington Post, USA Today, and Gourmet magazine. In 2010, Max & Erma's was runner up for Best Casual Restaurant and Best Soups, Pistacia Vera runner-up for Best Desserts, and Roosters won Best Wings.

=== Retail ===
The neighborhood is home to one of the world's largest producers of stained glass, the Franklin Art Glass Studios Inc., as well as several art galleries including the Archive Gallery, Hawk Galleries, Keny Gallery, and Kight Studio 551. Shops catering to European-imported retail include Caterina Ltd.

German Village houses a few unique shops including the 32-room The Book Loft of German Village, a pre-Civil War-era style bookstore.

== Miscellaneous ==
=== America's Great Places ===
In 2011, German Village was named as one of America's Great Places in the Neighborhoods category by the American Planning Association. Their description reads, "Unpretentious, renovated houses and cottages stand shoulder to shoulder. Small, meticulously maintained front yards front tree-lined streets with brick sidewalks and cultivated village planters. Small businesses and storefronts with eye-catching displays and the aroma of culinary delights draw in passing pedestrians. German Village has remained true to its mid-19th century history, architecture, and character despite periods of disinvestment, decline, and near ruin.".

=== Brewery District ===
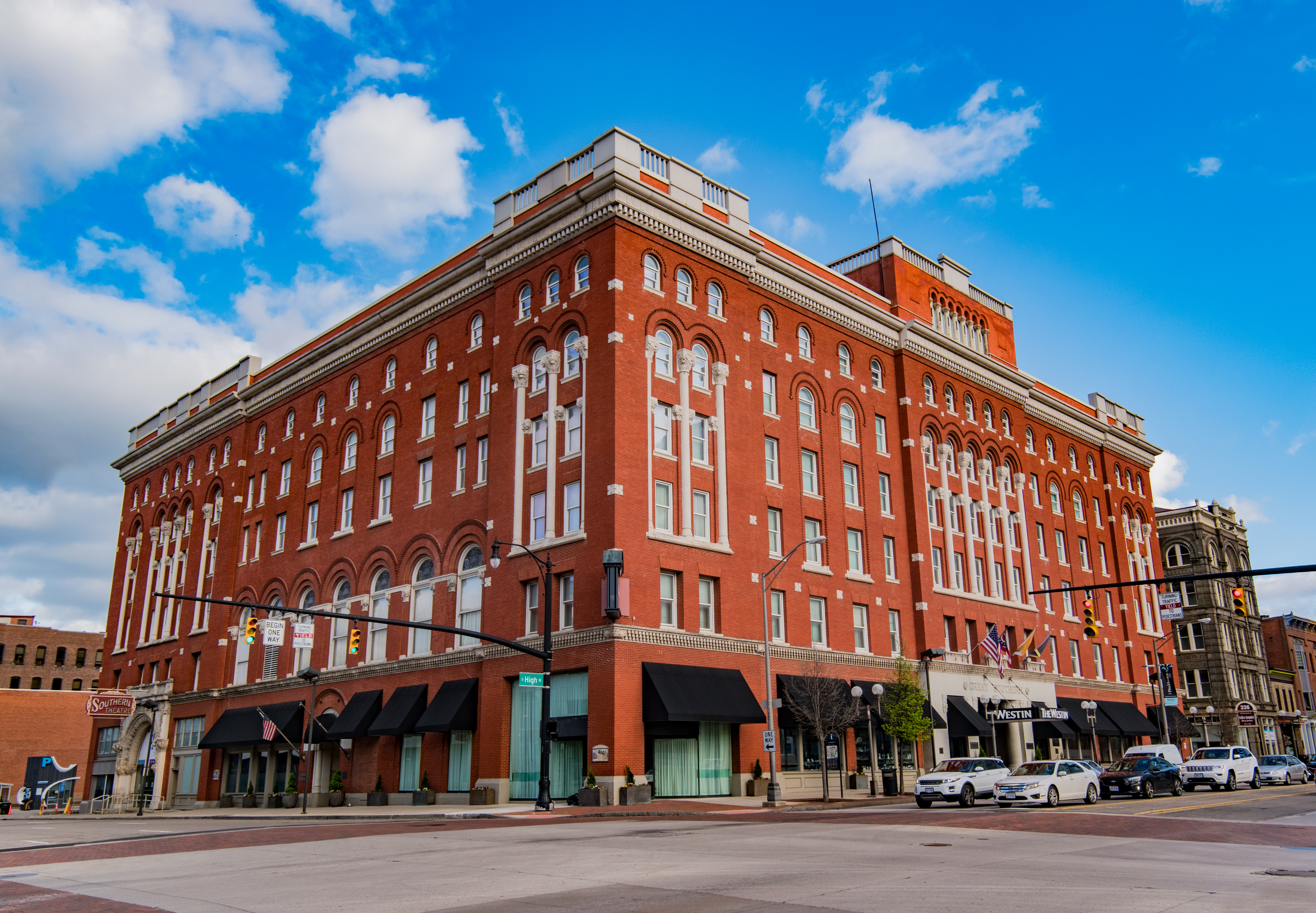
The Great Southern Hotel was constructed downtown in 1897 by Bavarian immigrant and Columbus brewing magnate Nicholas Schlee.

A prosperous industry for the German immigrants was the brewing industry. Today, the Brewery District, part of the greater German Village neighborhood, still partially resembles its notable past. During the 19th century, the area was found largely along both sides of S. Front Street from Livingston Avenue to Sycamore Street.

Notable breweries during this period included the Bavarian Brewery, started in 1849 by George Schlegel, which ultimately became the Shlegel Bavarian Brewery in 1860 when Bavarian Nicholas Schlee immigrated and took over. Schlee was president of the company that eventually constructed the Great Southern Hotel downtown. Schlee also owned the Lyceum Theater and served as vice president of the Central Bank. Conrad Born opened the Capital Brewery in 1859 and was also president of the Century Discount Company. The industry flourished during the early 20th century.

One of the last major brewers of the city before Prohibition was August Wagner, who immigrated from Bavaria in the late 19th century and worked as the brewmaster at the City Brewery before becoming president and general manager of the Gambrinus Brewing Company. By 1919, he had purchased all of the stock for the company to become the sole owner, and in 1938 he changed the name to August Wagner Breweries, Inc. He was known to parade around on a horse costumed as Gambrinus, the patron saint of beer. A statue of Gambrinus is located at 605 S. Front Street.

Twenty-nine breweries have existed in and around the village throughout its history.

=== Hoster Brewing Company legacy ===
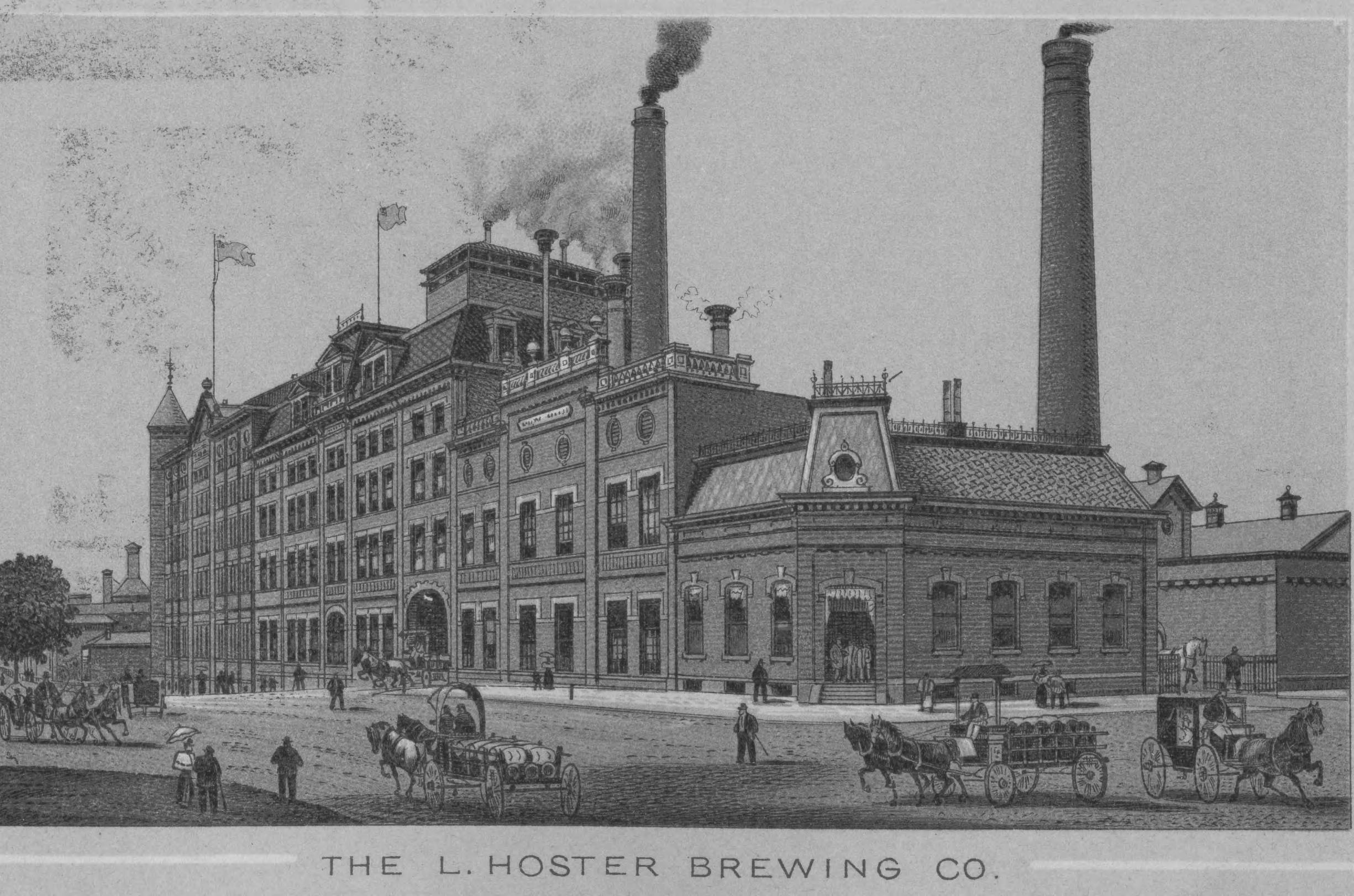
L. Hoster Brewing Company in the present-day Brewery District, c. 1893

While English breweries were found originally in the city, as German immigrants moved in, their brewing techniques were universally embraced and became the dominant methods for producing beer. Louis Hoster, an immigrant from Rheinpfalz, Germany, is notably credited for this transformation when he opened the City Brewery in the 1830s. He would go on to serve on the City Council between 1846 and 1854 while establishing the city's first wollen mill in 1852. In 1864, he established the Louis Hoster & Sons Brewery, which became the Hoster Columbus Associated Breweries in 1904. He would also serve on the Board of Education and was a Unionist Democrat.

Later members of Louis Hoster's brewing dynasty included his son Louis Philip Hoster, president of the Columbus Structural Steel Company, and Herman Hoster, son of Louis's son George, a graduate of Yale University, treasurer of Hoster Columbus Associated Breweries, and founder of the Columbus Envelope Company. Another son of George was Carl J. Hoster, graduate of Cornell University, who was President of the Hoster Columbus Associated Breweries as well as the Director of the Hayden Clinton National Bank and Columbus Driving Park Association, President of the U.S. Brewer's Association, 32nd degree of the Scottish Rite, and great-great uncle of former U.S. President George W. Bush.

Hoster Street in the German Village stretches six blocks between Lazelle and S. Front Streets.

=== Capital University ===
In 1831, the German Evangelical Lutheran Seminary secured 14 acres (57,000 m^{2}) in the south end, founded by William Schmidt, a graduate of the University of Halle in Germany. The school would go on to become what is known today as Capital University, still under the leadership of the Lutheran Church and now located in nearby Bexley.

=== The arts and athletics ===
The German immigrants brought with them a vibrant athletic and artistic heritage, which was reflected in their social establishments. The Columbus Maennerchor, a singing group, was established in 1848, and as early as 1852, won a ribbon for their talent at the North American Sangerfest. In 1866, the group won the silver pokal at a festival held in Louisville. In the late 19th century, another singing group called the Columbus Liederkranz was formed by the Germans, but was forced to cease during World War I because of heavy anti-German pressure. Many of its members joined the Maennerchor, which survived.

In the 1860s and 1870s the Maennerchor formed a drama division called the "Dramatischen Sektion." They would produce operas, dramas, and comedies until disbanding in the 1930s. One of their notable performances was their 1927 production of Friedrich von Schiller's Die Räuber. Another social group was the Schiller Club, founded in 1900.

The Columbus Turn Verein was a social and athletic (tumbling) association that dated back to 1866, and was a main organization from which the German immigrants drew mutual support. In the late 19th century the Turners merged with the Germania Gesang Verein, which hosted a Maennerchor and a Damenchor. Another merger enlarged the Germania in the late 1920s. The Germania merged with the Kicker's Soccer Club, which for many years was a very active part of the organization. The club also now includes a Fahrrad Verein (Bicycle Club), which goes on weekend outings to bike trails throughout Central Ohio. The club's official name is now the Germania Gesang und Sport Verein (singing and sports club). The Germania Club itself was located in a residence on Kossuth Street, but outgrew its first facility. In 1927 it purchased the present location at 543 South Front Street from the estate of Nicolaus Schlee, one of the prestigious brewmasters of the neighborhood.

The society is now located in the neighborhood known as the Brewery District of Columbus, which is the northernmost section of the German Village. Over the years the Germania Club has made it its mission to retain, promote and disseminate all that is good about German culture. A major component of this mission is the practice and performance of German song. Their choruses participate and support public events throughout Ohio during the year in appreciation for the community's support. The Germania Club celebrated its 147th anniversary in 2013 with an Oktoberfest.

In 1890, the Ohio State Buckeyes football team played their first-ever home game in the south end, at a location just west of present-day Schiller Park between Jaeger, Ebner, and Whittier (then called Schiller) Streets.

== Gallery ==
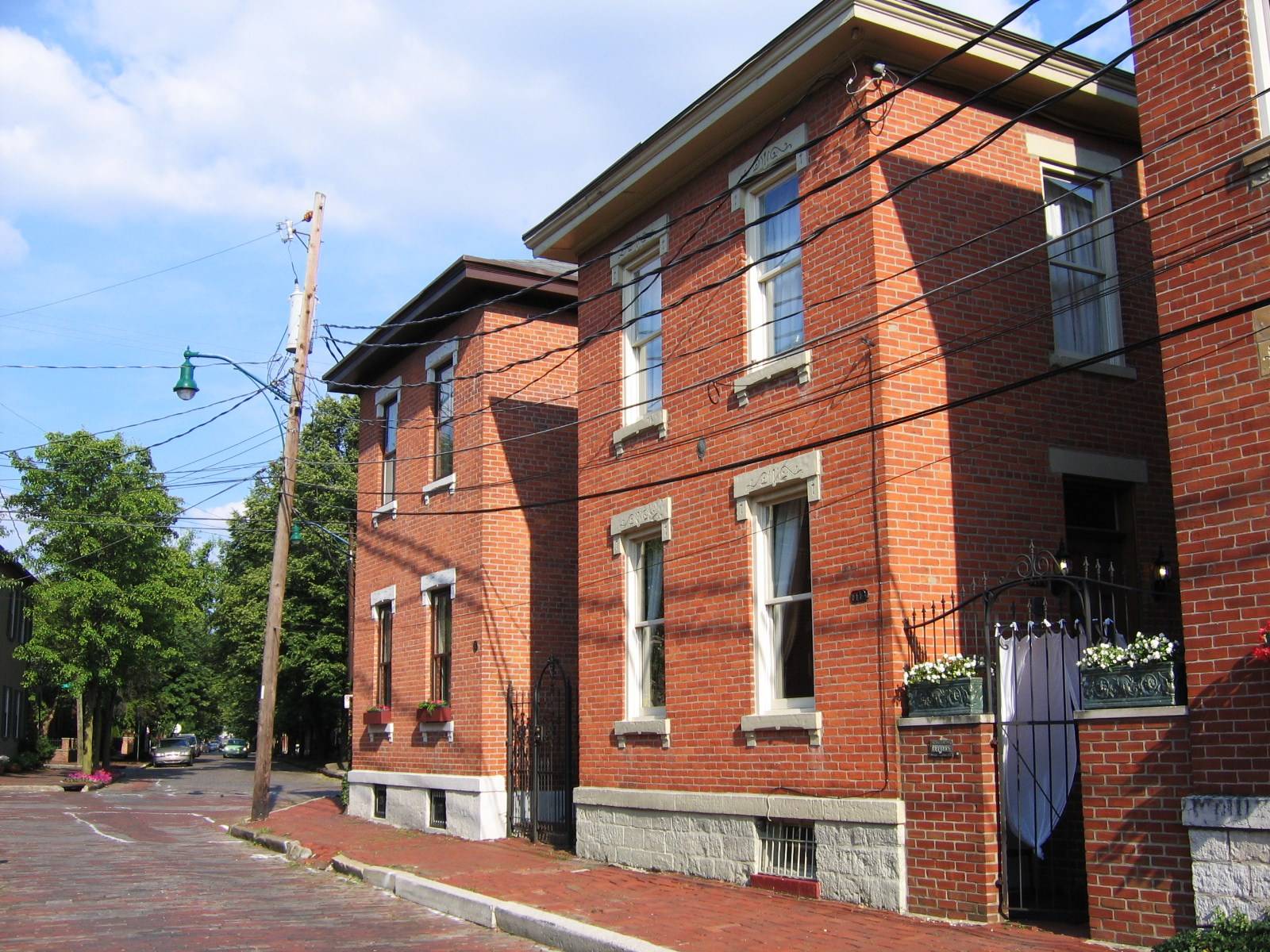
Typical German Village homes on Beck Street

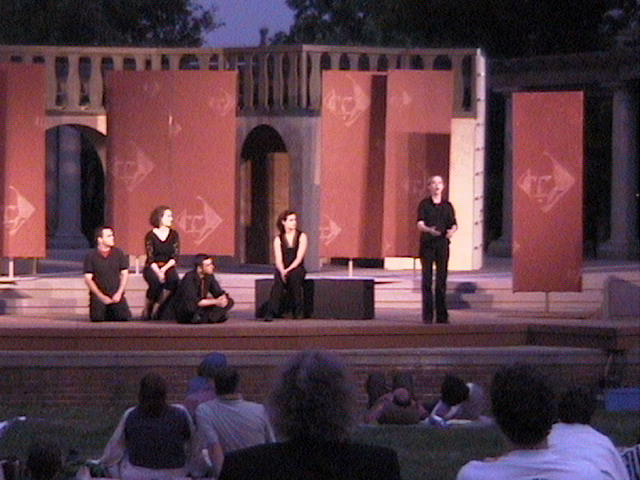
Shakespeare at Schiller Park

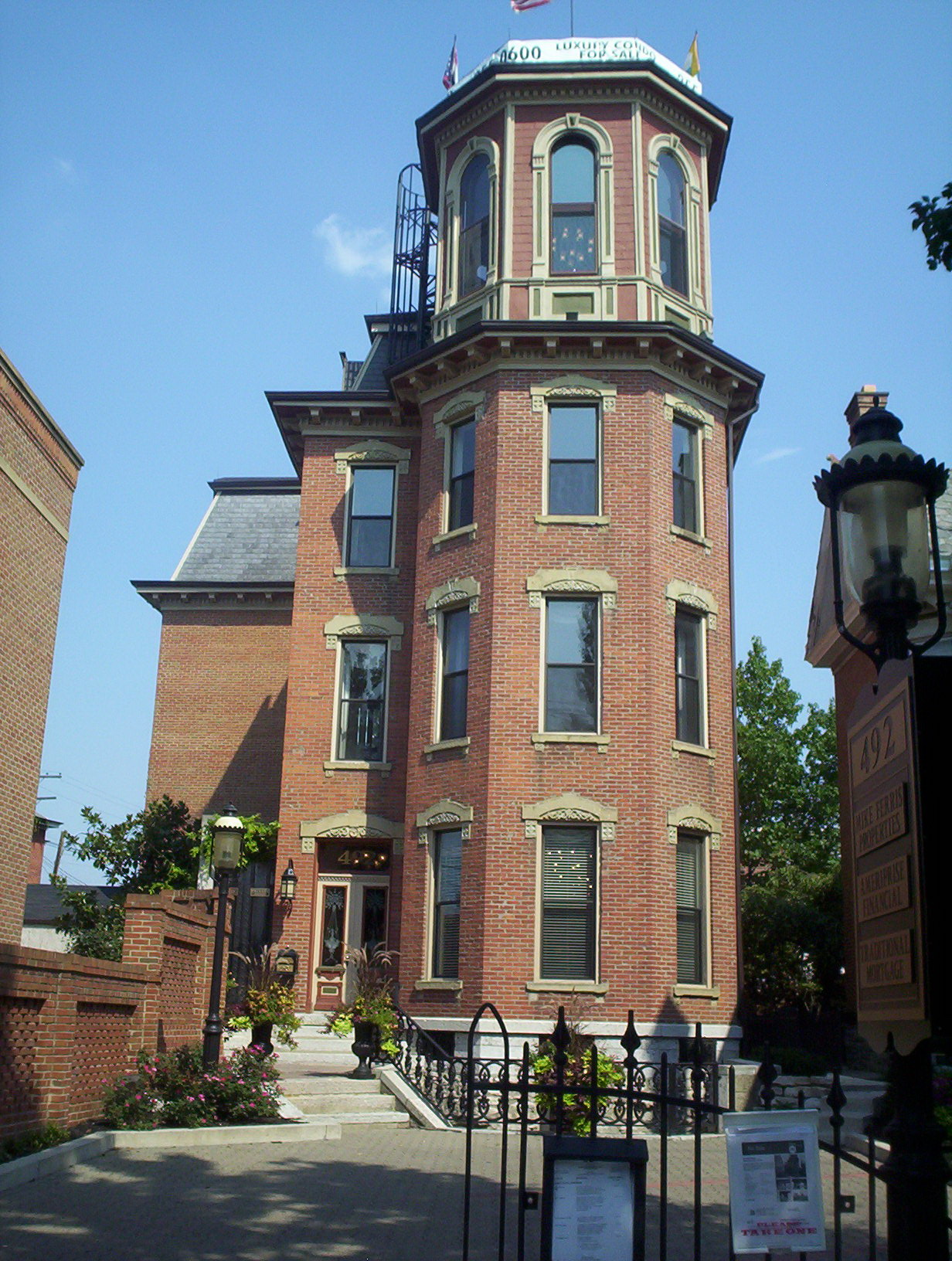
Schwartz Castle

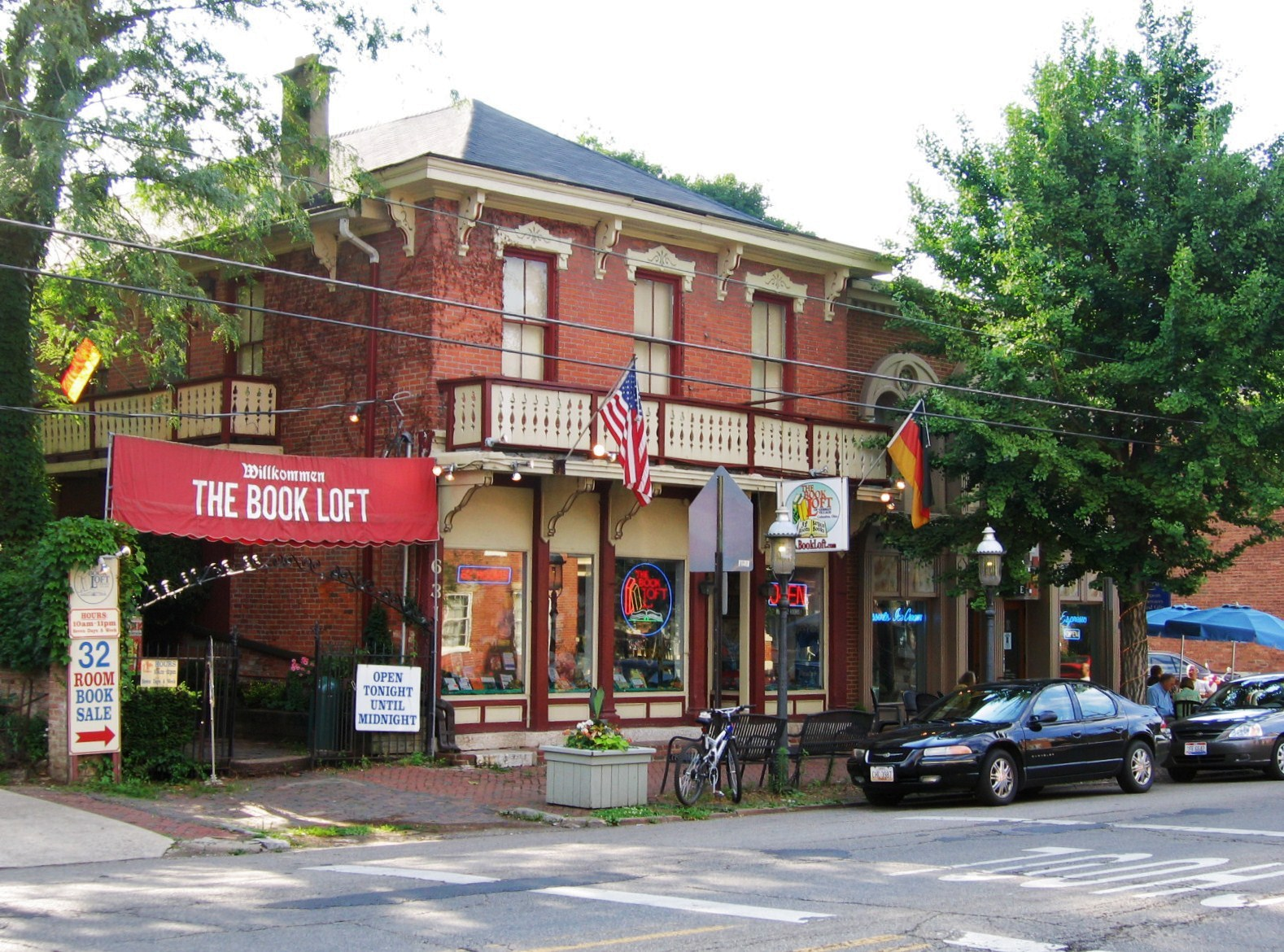
The Book Loft

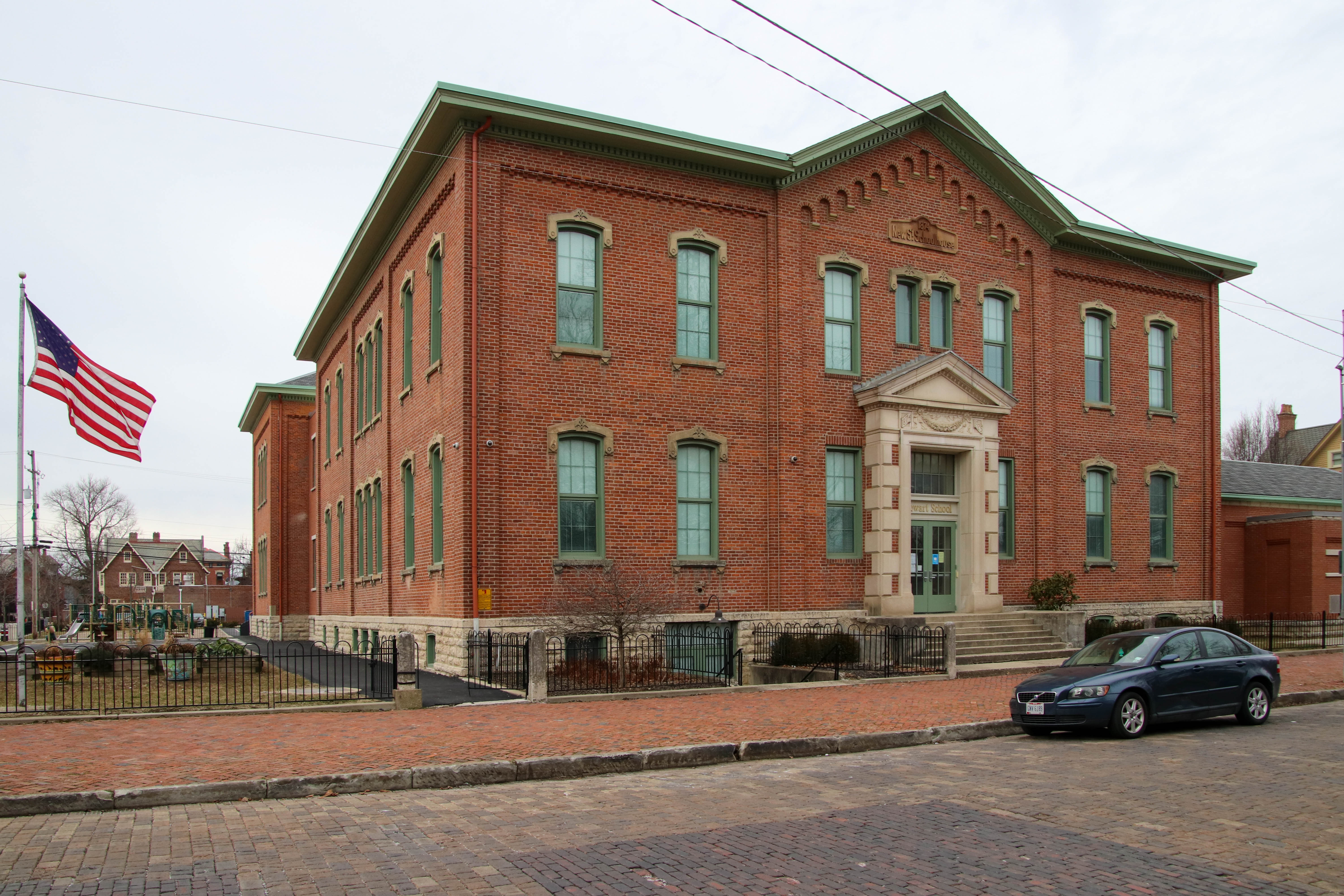
Stewart Alternative Elementary School

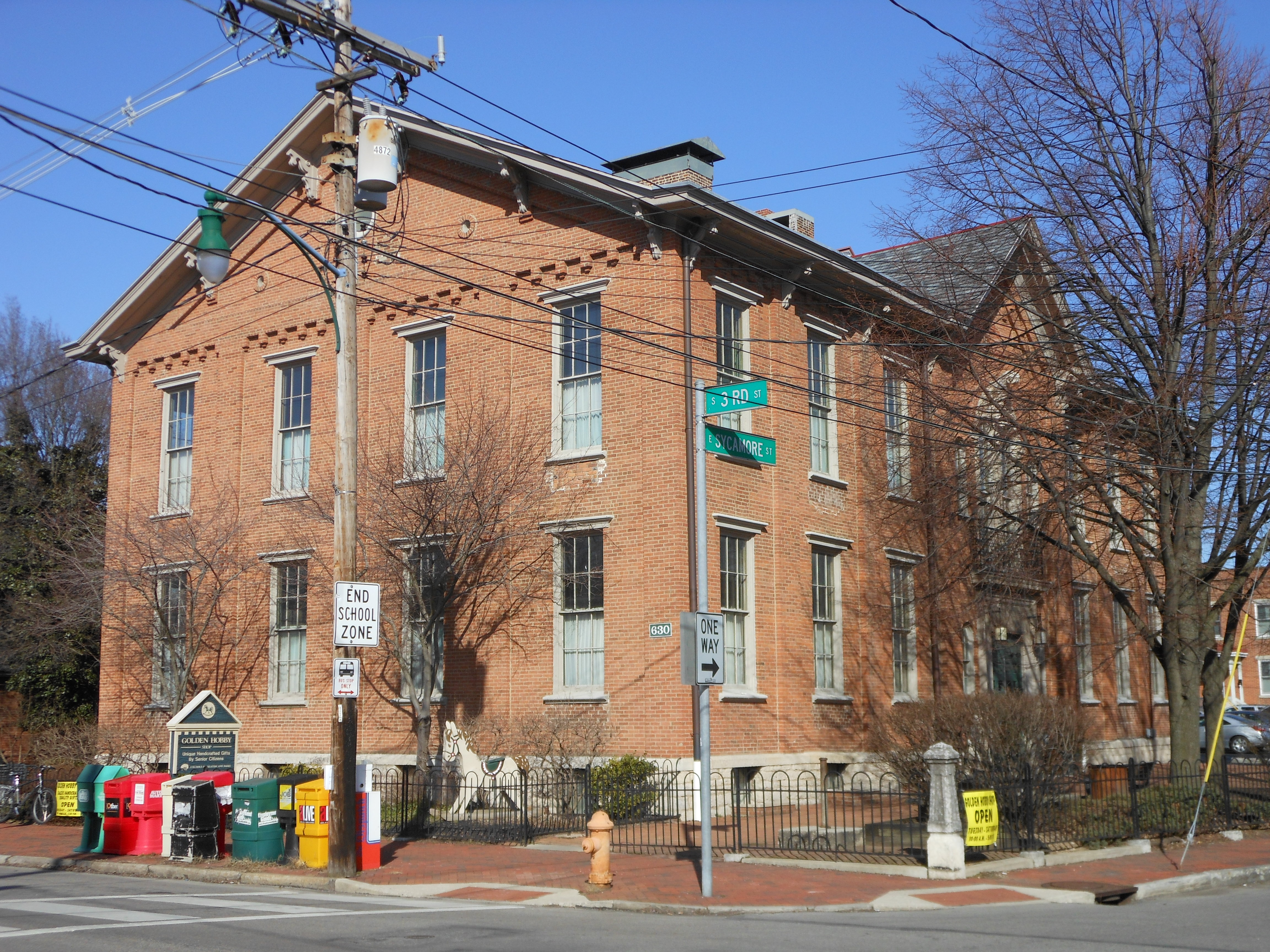
Former Third Street School

== See also ==
- German American
- Brewery District
- Neighborhoods in Columbus, Ohio
