= Schmidt's Sausage Haus =

German restaurant in Columbus, Ohio

Schmidt's Sausage Haus und Restaurant
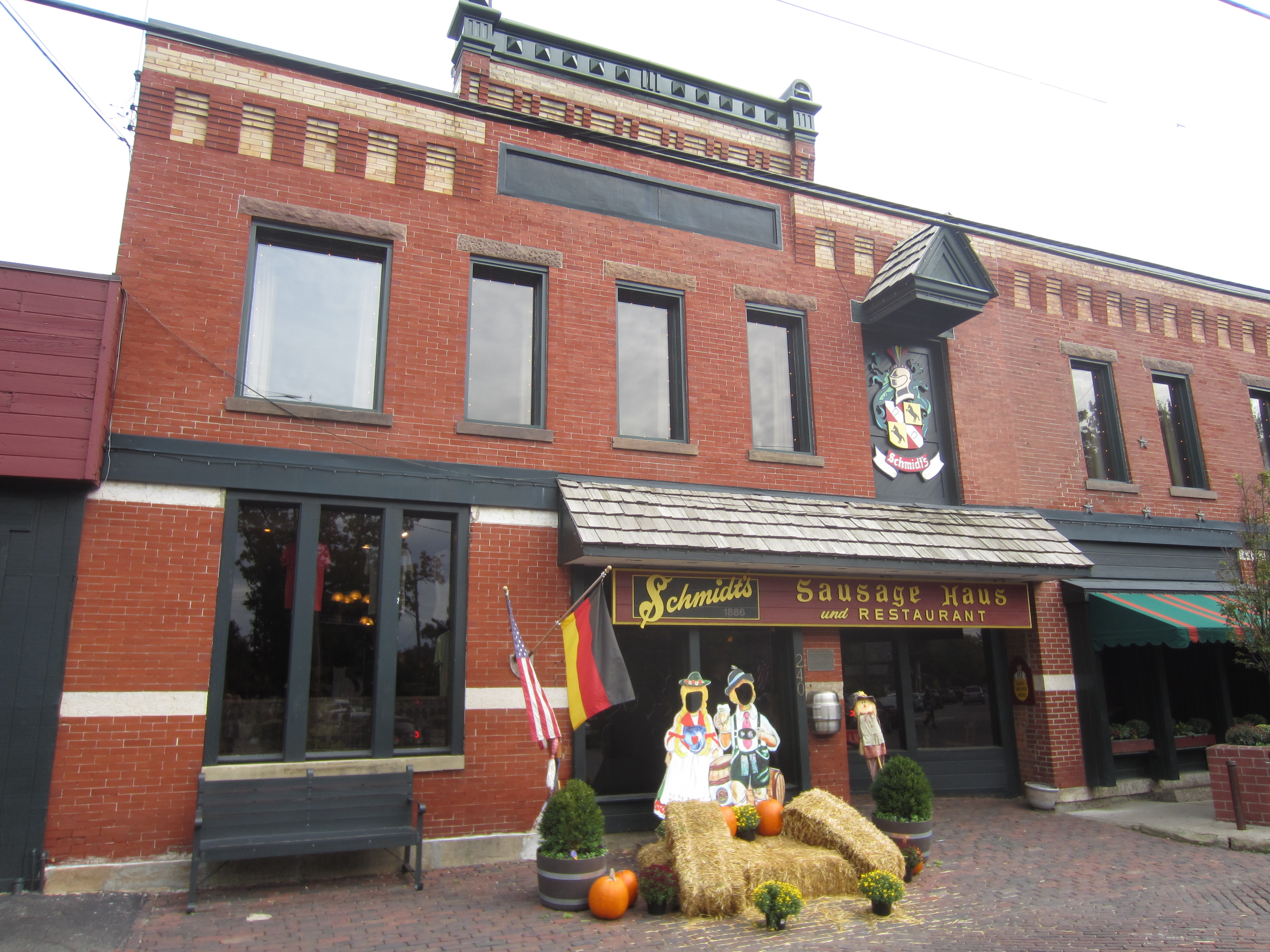
- Interactive map of Schmidt's Sausage Haus und Restaurant

Restaurant information
- Established: 1886
- Location: 240 E. Kossuth Street,, Columbus, Ohio, U.S.
- Coordinates: 39.946285°N 82.990998°W

Schmidt's Sausage Haus und Restaurant is a German restaurant in the German Village neighborhood of Columbus, Ohio. The business, in operation since 1886, is a contributing part of the German Village historic district, on the local and national registers of historic properties.

== History ==
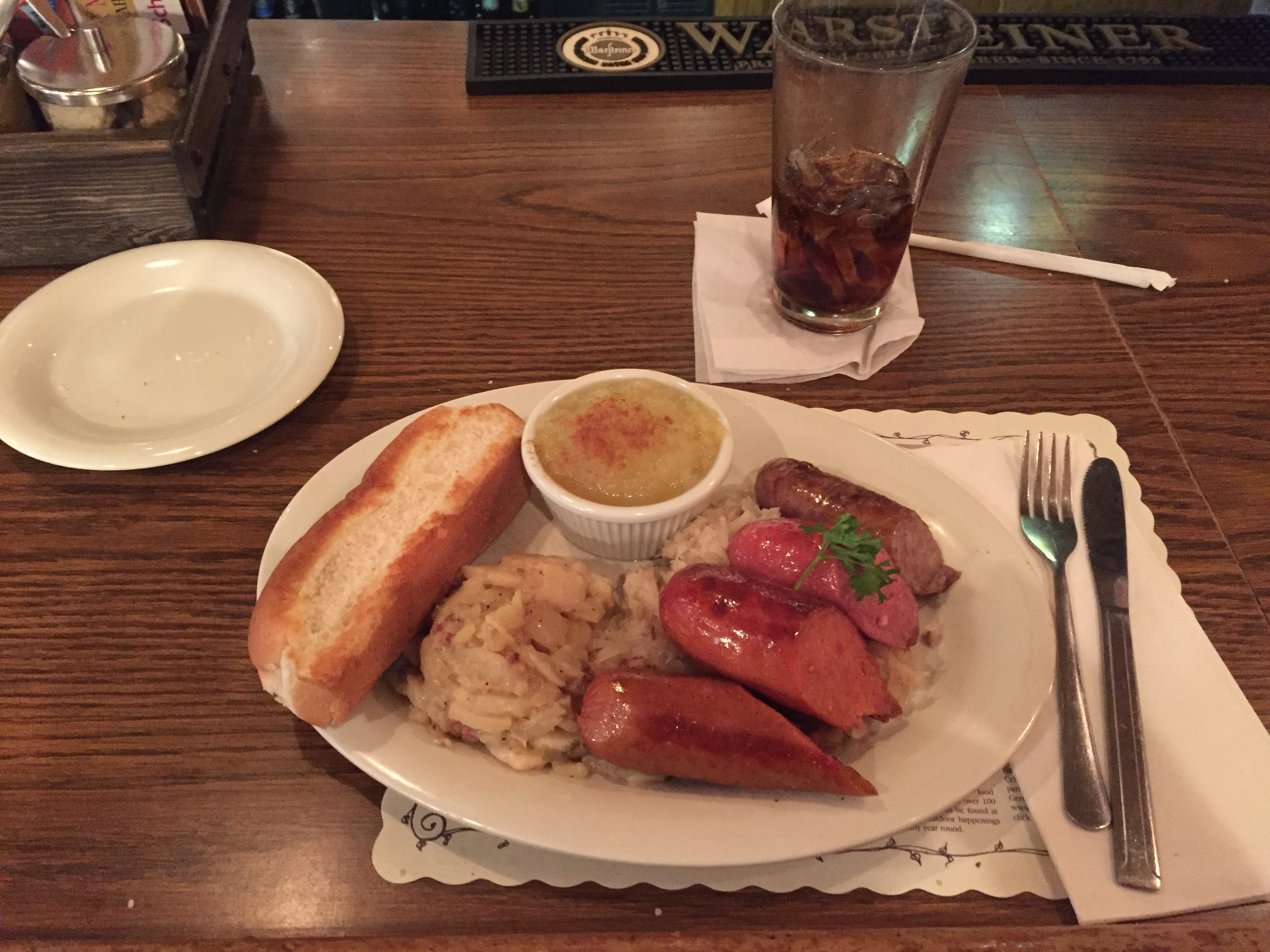
A sausage dish at the restaurant

Schmidt's first operated as the J. Fred Schmidt Meat Packing House, opened in 1886.

In 1914, Schmidt's first operated a food stand at the Ohio State Fair, and returns to the fair each year. The business is the oldest concession stand at the state fair.

In 1965, J. Fred Schmidt's grandson George F. Schmidt closed the meatpacking plant. He opened the Schmidt's restaurant two years later nearby the original building, which has since been demolished and replaced with apartments.

In 2014, the restaurant's "Bahama Mama" sausage on a roll was voted as Columbus's official food, in a Columbus Dispatch contest for readers. 2,900 readers voted for the dish, 46 percent of the total. The restaurant's cream puffs are also highly regarded, though they have been served since the 1960s, while Schmidt's has been making sausages since the 1880s.
