= German Village Commission =

- Abbreviation: GVC
- Formation: 1960
- Type: Governmental organization
- Headquarters: Columbus, Ohio
- Chairman: Anthony Hartke
- Website: German Village Commission

The German Village Commission is a governmental organization appointed by the Mayor of Columbus, Ohio to "preserve, protect and enhance the unique architectural and historical features of the German Village Historic District." The commission has the power to approve architectural designs and exterior alterations. The commission was formed in 1960 pursuant to ordinances #976-60 and #1221-60.

Commissioners	Position
Anthony Hartke	Chairman, Recommended by German Village Society
Ned Thiell	Vice Chair, Recommended by German Village Society
Charissa Durst	Architect
Racheal Schultz	Designee of Mayor
Robin Strohm	Designee of Council
Karen McCoy	N/A
AJ Minerva	N/A
