= Schwartz Castle =

- U.S. Historic district – Contributing property
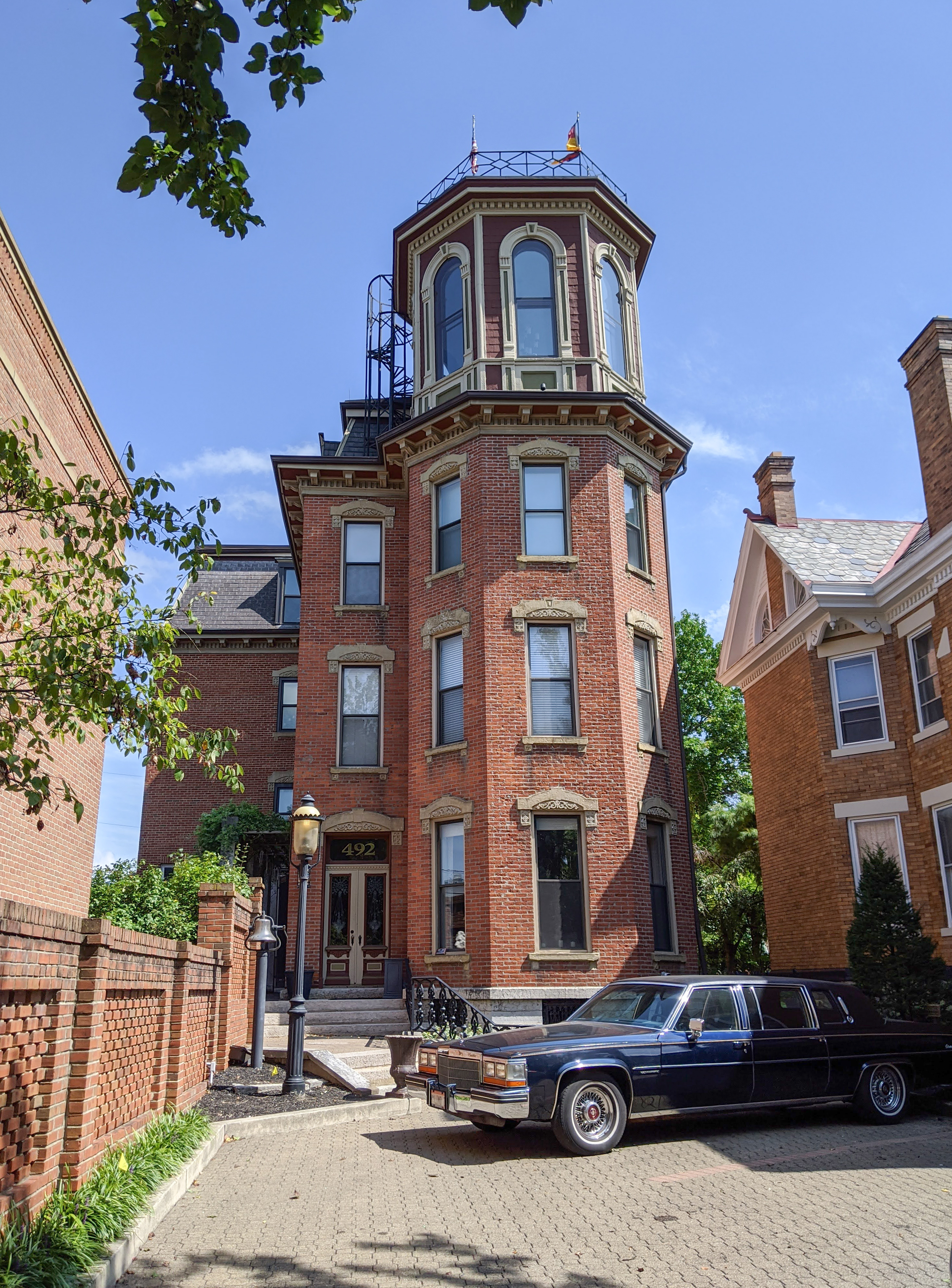
- Interactive map of Schwartz Castle
- Location: 492 S. Third Street, Columbus, Ohio
- Coordinates: 39.952387°N 82.995580°W
- Built: c. 1880
- Part of: German Village

Schwartz Castle is a historic house in the German Village neighborhood of Columbus, Ohio. The building contributes to the city-listed and National Register-listed district of the same name. The house was built around 1880 for German immigrant Frederich Wilhelm Schwartz, and has seen periods of vacancy surrounding periods of private residential ownership. In the early 20th century, it served as the Columbus Maternity Hospital, the only major public use of the building.

== Attributes ==
Schwartz Castle is an elaborate brick house, named due to its "castle-like" details. John M. Clark, writing for German Village Stories Behind the Brick, called the house potentially "the most unusual" in the neighborhood.

== History ==
The house was built around 1880 for Frederich Wilhelm Schwartz, who was born in Niagara Falls, New York in 1836. Schwartz was a successful business owner who operated an apothecary at East Main and North Fourth streets. Schwartz was a part of the sanitary movement in the 19th century, and thus had his house affixed with easy-to-clean surfaces, including tile walls and iron stairways, and had a turret built atop the building. Schwartz would sunbathe daily inside the turret.

Biographies of Schwartz range in details, with some incorrectly adding eccentric details to his life. Although Schwartz lived in the house with his sister until his death, rumors spread of him becoming unhinged after a fiancée broke off their engagement, and that he died alone with his body undiscovered for weeks. After Schwartz's death, his friend George Karb (long-time mayor of Columbus) served as the executor of his estate.

After Schwartz's death, the house was vacant for three years. In 1917, it became home to the Columbus Maternity Hospital. After the hospital closed, the building became vacant once again, and fell into disrepair. In the mid-1950s it became a rooming house, and drew attention for two murders that took place there. In the 1960s the house was condemned and faced demolition. In 1973, partners Bob Echele and Bob Gease purchased the house, gutting it and adding a fourth floor behind the turret. The couple installed a movie theater, ballroom, and private elevator. In 2003, realtor Mike Ferris purchased the house and again renovated the interior. In 2010 a bank owned the property, and it returned into private ownership in 2011.

== See also ==
- National Register of Historic Places listings in Columbus, Ohio
