= Pistacia Vera =

Restaurant in Columbus, Ohio, U.S.

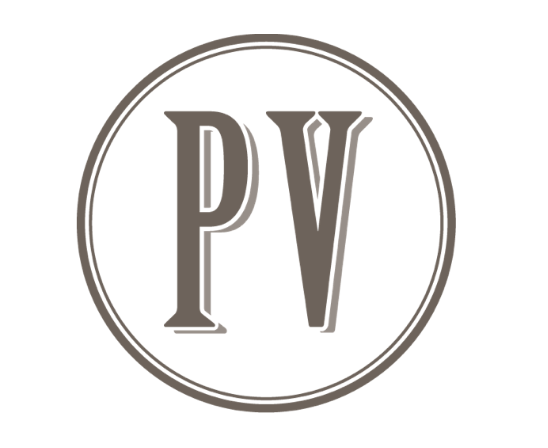

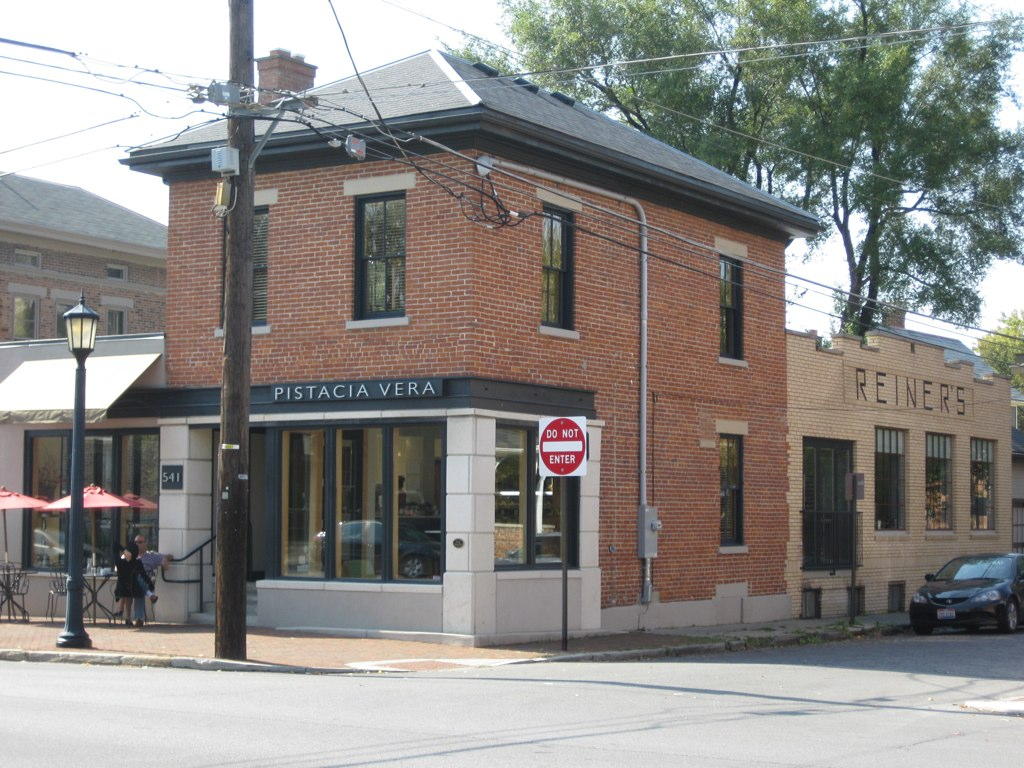
- Interactive map of Pistacia Vera

Restaurant information
- Established: 2004
- Owners: Spencer Budros, Anne Fletcher
- Location: 541 S. Third Street, Columbus, Ohio
- Coordinates: 39.951278°N 82.996101°W
- Website: www.pistaciavera.com

Pistacia Vera is a bakery and café in the German Village neighborhood of Columbus, Ohio. The building contributes to the city-listed and National Register-listed district of the same name.

== Services ==
All of the café's foods are made on-site, including its macarons, pâte de fruit, liqueur-spiked preserves, tarts, cookies, croissants, teacakes, and éclairs, including some which are crème brûlée-stuffed. In addition to its French pastries, the café also prepares brunch-style meals (primarily quiches and croque monsieurs accompanied by simple salads. The café is perhaps best known for its colorful dozen of varieties of macarons.

== History ==
The first known commercial use of the property was in 1843 for Greenley Dill's brick-making company. Local clay was used in thirteen brickyards across South Columbus, and the material was in high demand. By 1930, Reiner's Doughnuts relocated to the property after having been operating one block north. The business was owned by German immigrant Gottlieb "George" Reiner, who sold cakes and doughnuts for approximately 44 years. In 1974, the Will Plank family purchased the building and began operating Thurn's Bäckerei (named for Will's in-laws). The business operated for 33 years, closing in 2004. Pistacia Vera was founded in the same year by siblings Spencer Budros and Anne Fletcher, as a stall in North Market, a marketplace and food hall in Downtown Columbus. Around 2006, the business became "Pistachio", operating in the Short North district of Columbus. Around 2007, the owners extensively renovated and moved into the South Third Street bakery building. In 2013, Pistacia Vera reopened a stall in North Market, while continuing to operate the German Village café. In 2018, the owners hired a new beverage manager who had worked in coffee shops across the city and remade the café's beverage program.

Amid the COVID-19 pandemic, the café closed for several months due to a stay-at-home order; reopening in June 2020 with takeout and curbside delivery. The café's North Market stall remained closed. Also in 2020, its pastry chef and co-owner Spencer Budros was a semifinalist for the Outstanding Baker James Beard Award. In August 2020, amid restaurant and North Market stall closures, the continuing uncertainty around the COVID pandemic led the owners to permanently close its North Market stall.

Edible Columbus reviewed its favorite bakeries in 2015, including Pistacia Vera. In 2020, The Columbus Dispatch reviewed the bakery as "top-notch", and opined that "no food-producing outlet in Columbus is better at what it does than Pistacia Vera". In 2022, Columbus Navigator listed the café first in a list of best bakeries in the city. Columbus Monthly's reader poll in 2022 determined most readers to find the café to make the best desserts in the city.

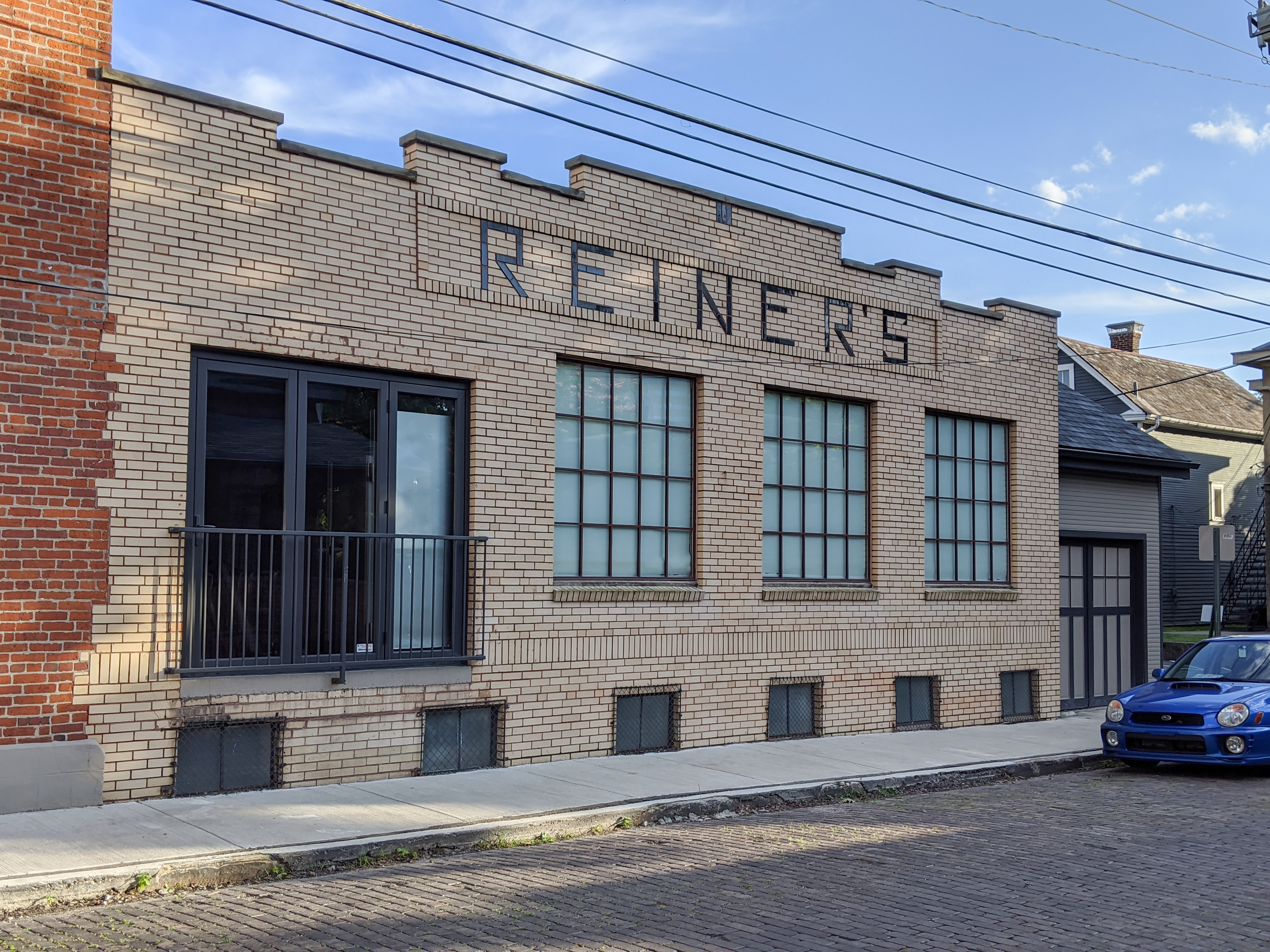
Reiner's facade still extant on Hoster Street

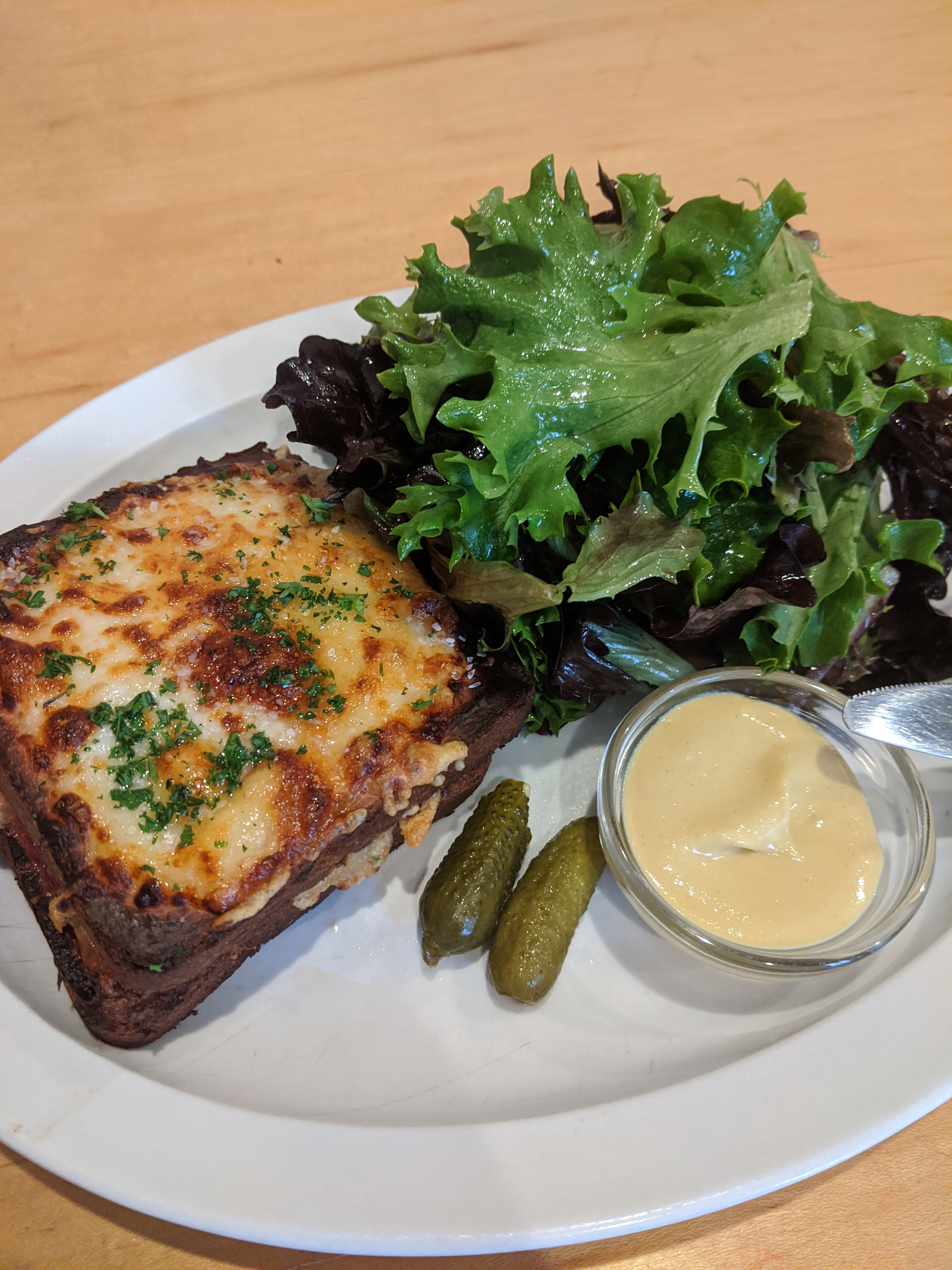
Croque monsieur

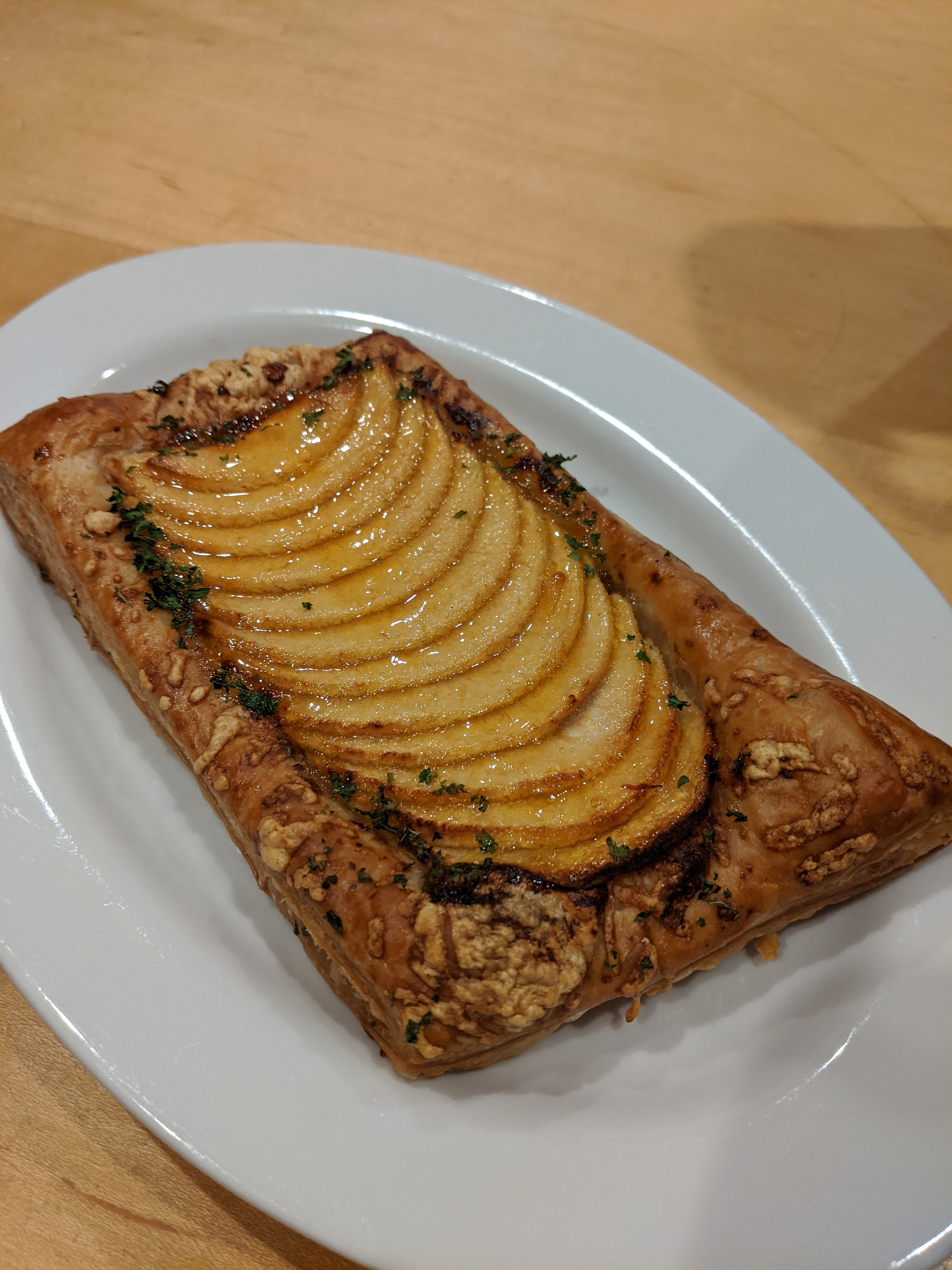
Pastry

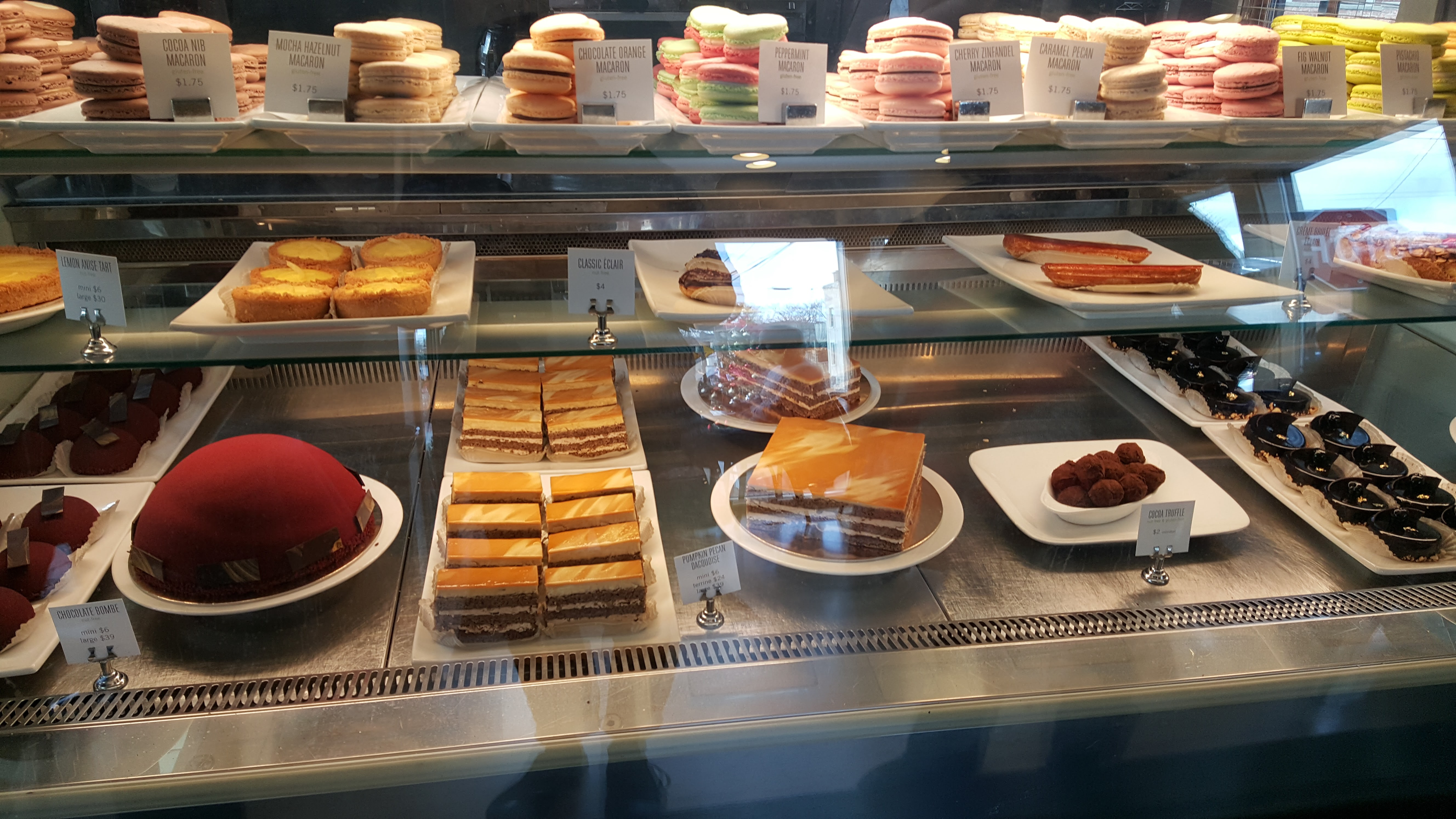
Pastry case
