= The Book Loft =

Bookstore in Columbus, Ohio, United States

Coordinates: 39.9495°N 82.9957°W

The Book Loft of German Village
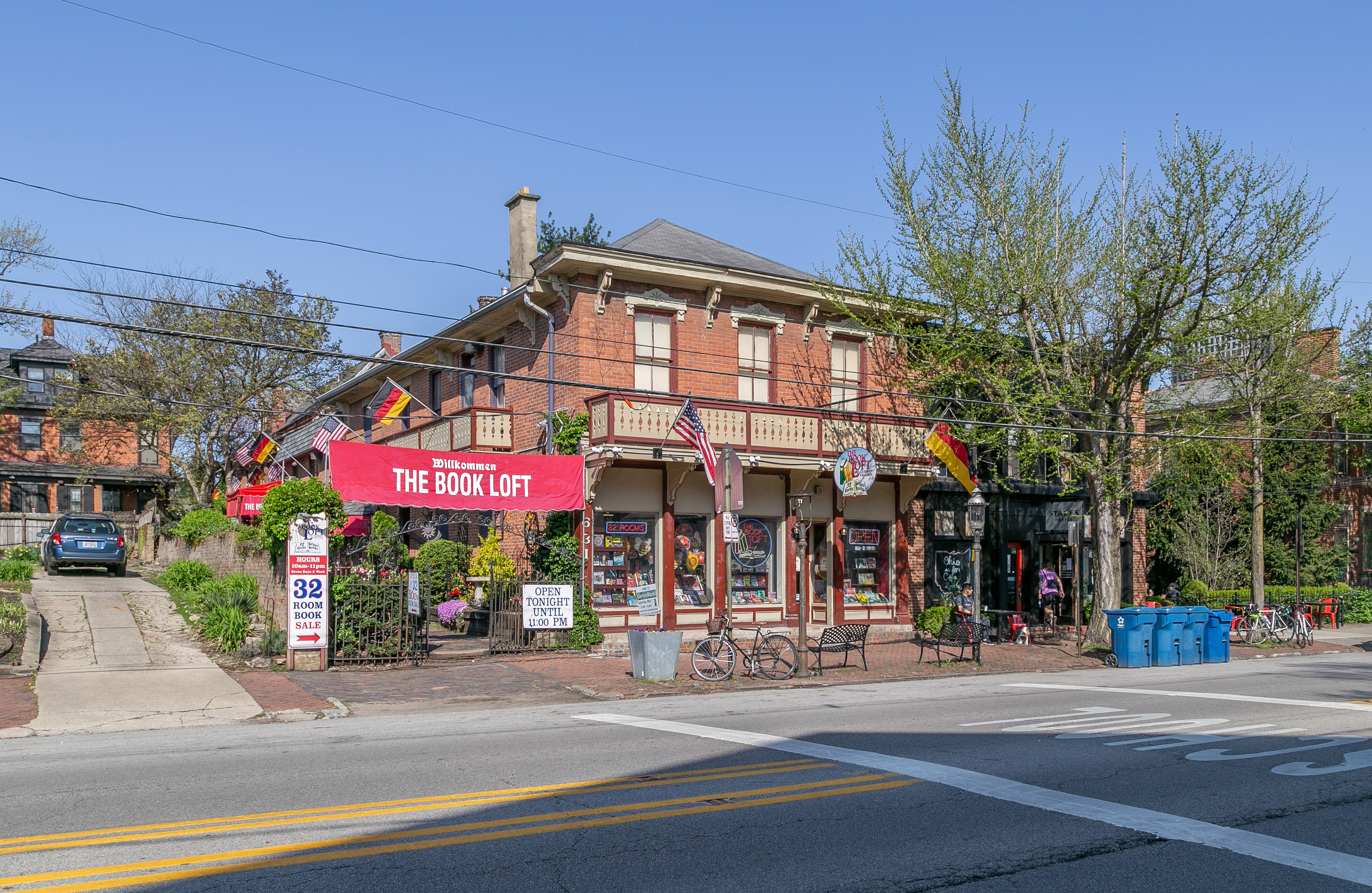
- Type: Book store
- Founded: 1977
- Founder: Carl Jacobsma and Roger Tompkins
- Headquarters: 631 South Third Street, Columbus, Ohio, United States
- Owner: Carl Jacobsma and Russell Iler
- Building details
- Website: www.bookloft.com

The Book Loft of German Village is an independent bookstore in the German Village neighborhood of Columbus, Ohio. Opened in 1977 and described by the Columbus Business First as "iconic" and a "tourist destination", the store has also been called "a national treasure" by The New York Times. The Book Loft has been described by visitors as a "literary labyrinth" due to its maze-like 32 rooms of books connected by narrow passageways and staircases.

== Description ==
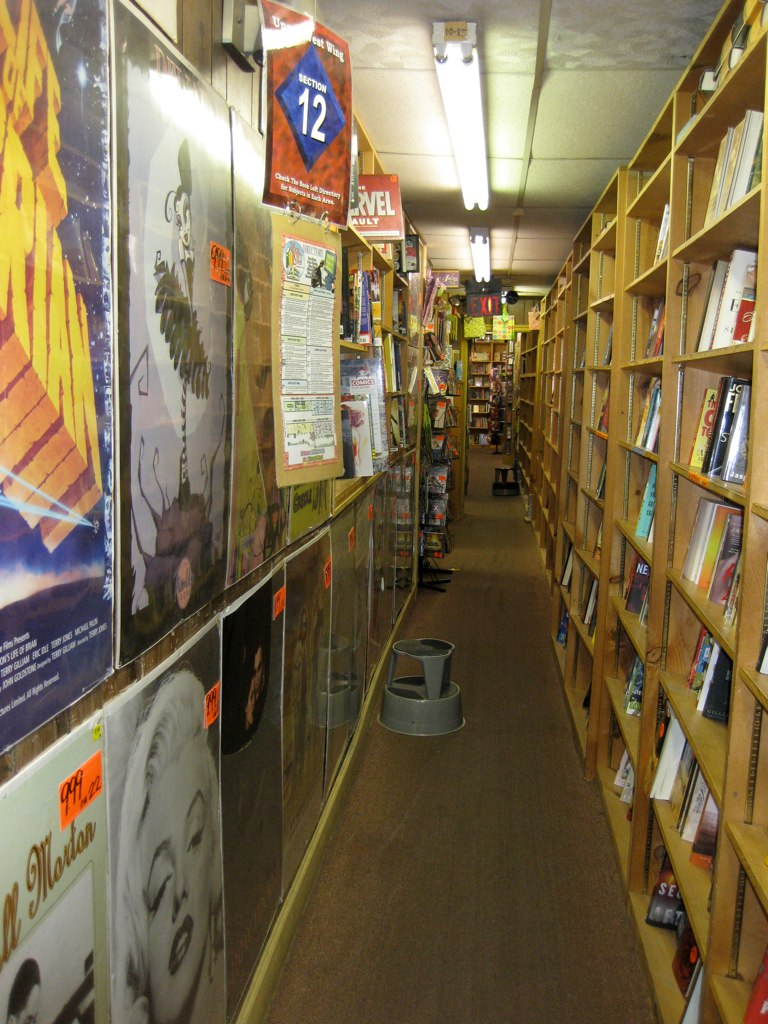
Store interior

The Book Loft of German Village is one of the largest independent bookstores in the United States, with at least 500,000 books in stock and close to a million volumes available during Christmas holiday season. A garden path lined with park benches leads to a patio with bargain books and the main entrance. The store experience includes walking narrow hallways with stairways to multiple levels and the occasional dead end. A map describing the contents of each of the 32 rooms is available for visitors. The Book Loft covers 7,500 square feet of space, and along with books the store sells jigsaw puzzles, posters, and other merchandise. Eighteen music systems each play different music to create a genre-specific soundtrack in each area. The children's areas are the most popular rooms, according to owner Carl Jacobsma.

Columbus area author Hanif Abdurraqib has described the sense of getting lost in the store as a formative experience, saying "It was important to read my way out of that maze... By the time I exited The Book Loft, I was able to imagine a different and better world than the one that I'd entered."

One of the niches the bookstore fills is providing closeouts ("remainders") that are sold at a heavily reduced price. The store provides a discount on every book sold in the store, with discounts ranging from 5% to 90%.

The Book Loft offers multiple events a month such as author readings and signings, as well as sponsoring off-site events like comic book conventions.

== Building ==
The store is located in red brick buildings dating to before the Civil War. 631 South Third Street once housed Maurer's Saloon and a nickelodeon movie theater called the Lily Cinema. Living quarters were located on the second floor of what was known as the Substantial Building, which would go on to serve as a church, a decorating company, an art studio and school, and an indoor golf course. In 1968 Marnie Southard opened a flower shop in one room of the building; later buying the entire building, she opened a larger art and antiques store and divided the rest of the building into six small shops. She also bought the adjacent building at 632 City Park, which had opened as Wolf Tavern in the nineteenth century and through the years had served as a series of small groceries. Southard created a block-long retail mall, building a new store connecting the two buildings, which was the original space of the Book Loft and now serves as its main entrance.

== History ==
Former teachers Carl Jacobsma and Roger Tompkins owned a gift shop in the mid-1970s, and in 1977 Marnie Southard asked them to join her in a retail venture. Jacobsma and Tompkins opened a bookstore in one of the stores of Southard's mall; at opening, the store was small, with two floors with a loft on top, providing inspiration for the store's name. When neighboring shops went out of business, Tompkins and Jacobsma would buy the space, tear down the walls, and expand. In a slow and steady process over the next fifteen years, they would repeat this process at least seven times, until the entire building was theirs. In 1987 the shop's book buyer, Russell Iler, became co-owner of the store; owner Roger Tompkins died in 2012.

The Book Loft struggled with tight finances due to the rise of Internet retailers in the late 2000s; since the mid-2010s, the business has recovered financially. In 2021, the store owners purchased the building.
