= Franklin Art Glass Studios =

Stained glass company in Ohio, U.S.

Coordinates: 39.949299°N 82.991804°W

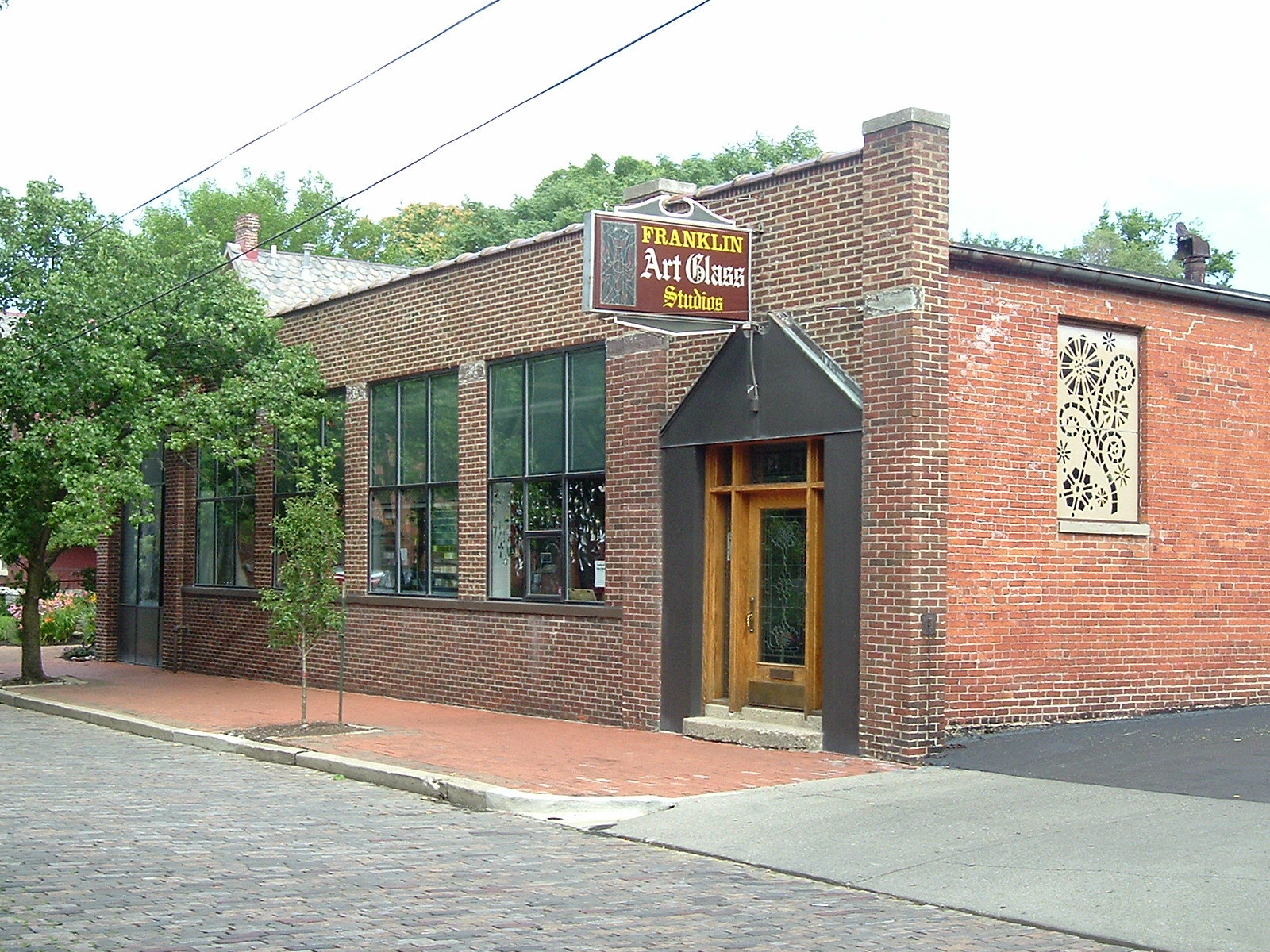
Franklin at its current location, 222 E. Sycamore St.

Franklin Art Glass Studios, Inc. is a stained glass studio, stained glass supply wholesaler and retailer located in Columbus, Ohio. The stained glass studio specializes in the design, fabrication, and restoration of stained leaded glass as well as faceted glass. The wholesale and retail departments meanwhile sell glass from nearly every domestic and foreign manufacturer and all the tools necessary to the trade. All facets of the business are located in Franklin’s 35,000-square-foot (3,300 m^{2}) facility located in the German Village district of Columbus.

== History ==
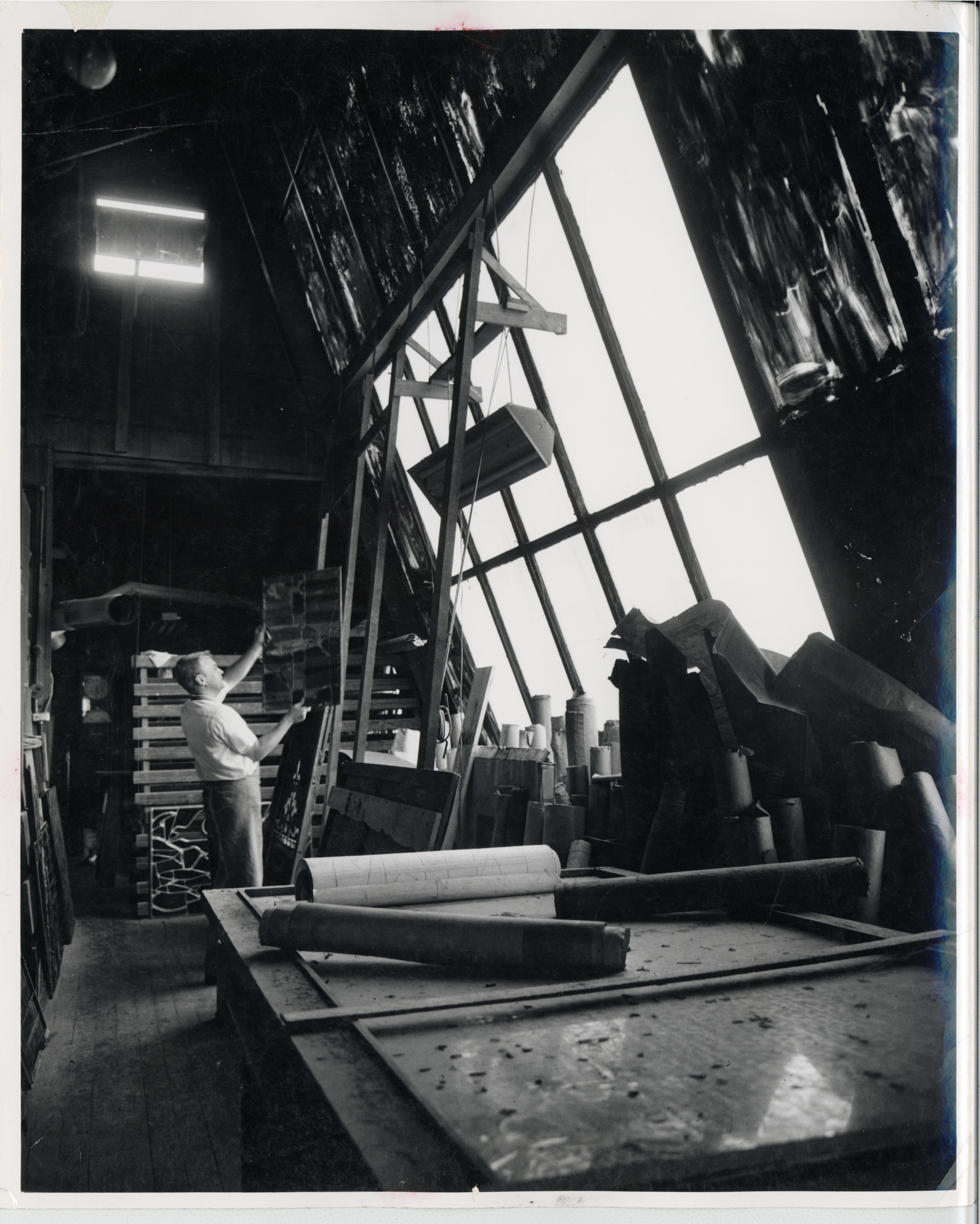
James Helf in the Oak Street studio

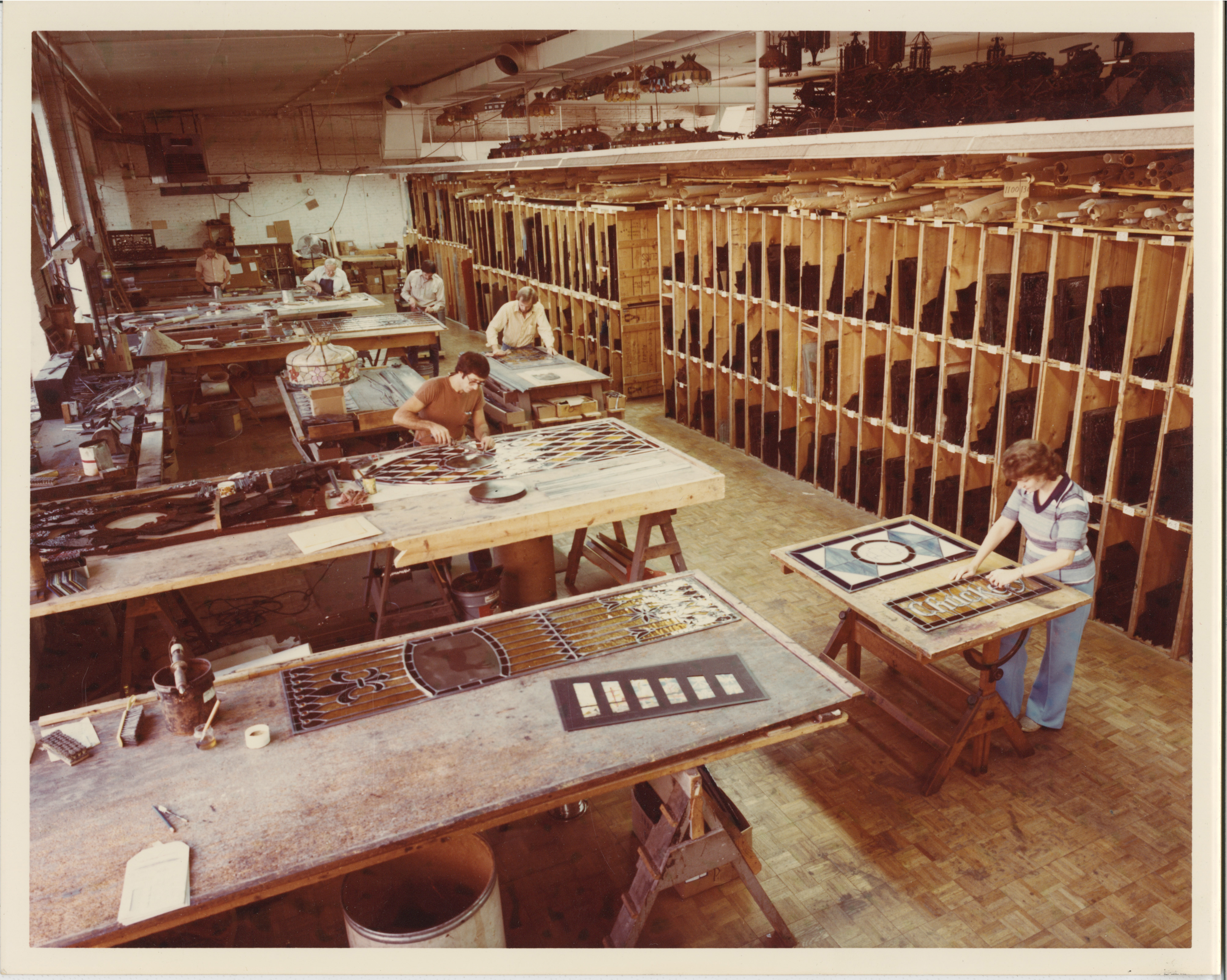
Inside the Sycamore Street studio in the early 1970s

Franklin Art Glass Studios, Inc. was founded in 1924 with three principals, Wilhelm Kielblock, Wilhelm Kielmeier, and Henry ‘Elmore’ Helf. Originally located at 135 East Spring St. company’s creation was during the depression and as the depression deepened and commissions for stained glass continued to decline, Wilhelm Kielmeier pulled out of the company. This left Wilhelm Kielblock, a noted German stained glass designer and painter, and Elmore Helf, a business man, to reorganize the company. Elmore Helf was not the first member of the Helf family to run a stained glass studio, his father, Henry Helf, was shop foreman for Von Gerichten Art Glass Company in Columbus, Ohio. Henry worked there until the company’s closing in 1931 and passed his love and the trade of stained glass onto Elmore. To keep Franklin Art Glass alive during those difficult times the decision was made that Kielblock would relinquish his ownership of Franklin Art Glass, which was actually his portion of the debt, to Helf. Kielblock would then operate as an independent contractor under the name, Ohio Trade Studios, all the while operating in the same building as Franklin Art Glass. Through this arrangement Helf would sell the Munich – style commissions designed and painted by Kielblock’s Ohio Trade Studio. This arrangement continued until Wilhelm Kielblock’s death in 1987. After successfully riding out the depression Franklin Art Glass became a financially stable stained glass studio working on residential and liturgical commissions. In 1945 Elmore’s son, James Helf assumed control of the company after returning home from serving in WWII. Business was as usual until Franklin Art Glass was approached by Wendy's Old Fashioned Hamburgers, who were building their first hamburger stand just a few blocks from Franklin’s then Oak Street location. Wendy’s interior decorator wanted to use stained glass lamps in the restaurants, and with the help of Franklin Art Glass, they designed a series of hanging lamps which would eventually become synonymous with Wendy’s restaurants. Throughout the 1960s and 1970s Franklin produced over 45,000 lampshades for Wendy’s and even expanded its employees to 40 to keep up with the demand.

Elmore Helf died on September 16, 1968, in Columbus, Ohio, at the age of 76. According to an obituary published in ‘Stained Glass Quarterly’ he was remembered as “one of the oldest active members of the Stained Glass Association of America, his firm the Franklin Art Glass Studios having been members for over forty years.”

During this time of company growth it was necessary to have more room to accommodate the new business so Franklin was moved from its second location on 214 Oak Street to its new and current location at 222 East Sycamore Street. The new facility located in Columbus’s historic German Village is a 23,000-square-foot (2,100 m^{2}) plant with a 12,000-square-foot (1,100 m^{2}) warehouse.

In 1971 after graduating with a degree in Business Administration from Eastern Kentucky University, Gary Helf began working at Franklin Art Glass. Up until this point the business had been only stained glass commissions, but with the increasing popularity of hobbies in the late 1960s Franklin Art Glass decided to capitalize on the trend and began to offer stained glass classes. This eventually led to the retail and wholesale business through which customers can buy supplies.

Franklin Art Glass remains a multifaceted business by doing stained glass commissions for such notable businesses as Victoria's Secret, Wendy’s Old Fashioned Hamburgers, Max & Erma’s, and White Castle all the while running a supply business.

In 2003 the fourth generation of the Helf family joined Franklin Art Glass’s legacy. Andrea (Helf) Reid started after graduating from Wittenberg University in 2003 with a BA.
