= L. Hoster Brewing Company =

- U.S. National Register of Historic Places
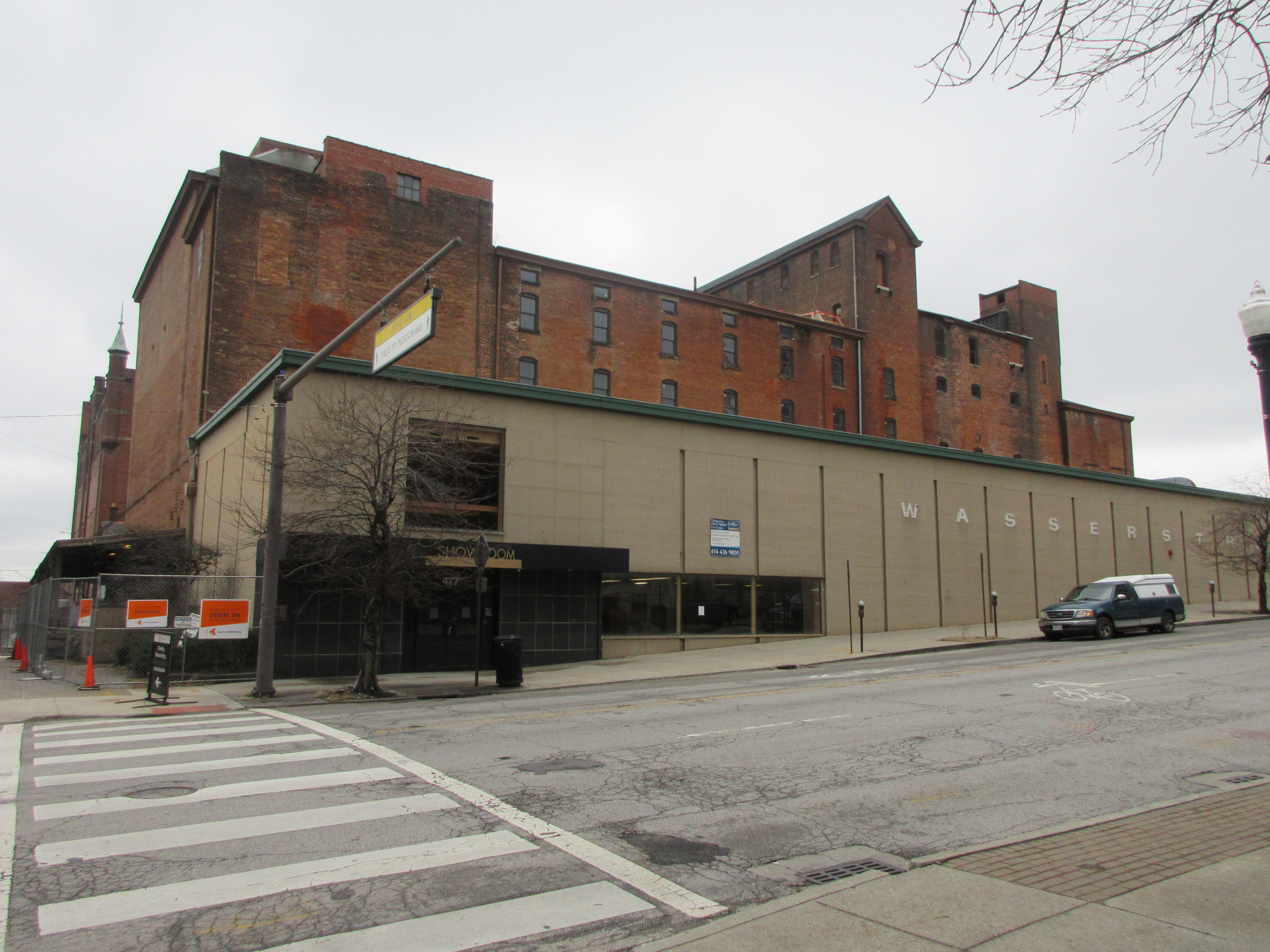
- Exterior in 2013
- Interactive map highlighting the building's location
- Location: 477 S. Front St., Columbus, Ohio
- Coordinates: 39.952226°N 83.001039°W
- NRHP reference No.: 100004060
- Added to NRHP: June 17, 2019

The L. Hoster Brewing Company is set of historic buildings in the Brewery District of Columbus, Ohio, United States. The site was listed on the National Register of Historic Places in 2009.

The complex is under renovation, expected to be completed in summer 2023. The new development will be called Front & Fulton; it will have restaurant, cafe, bar, office, and apartment spaces.

== Attributes ==
In 2019, the site included eight buildings, constructed from about 1887 to 1967. The easternmost building was a 1960s-era Wasserstrom store.

== History ==
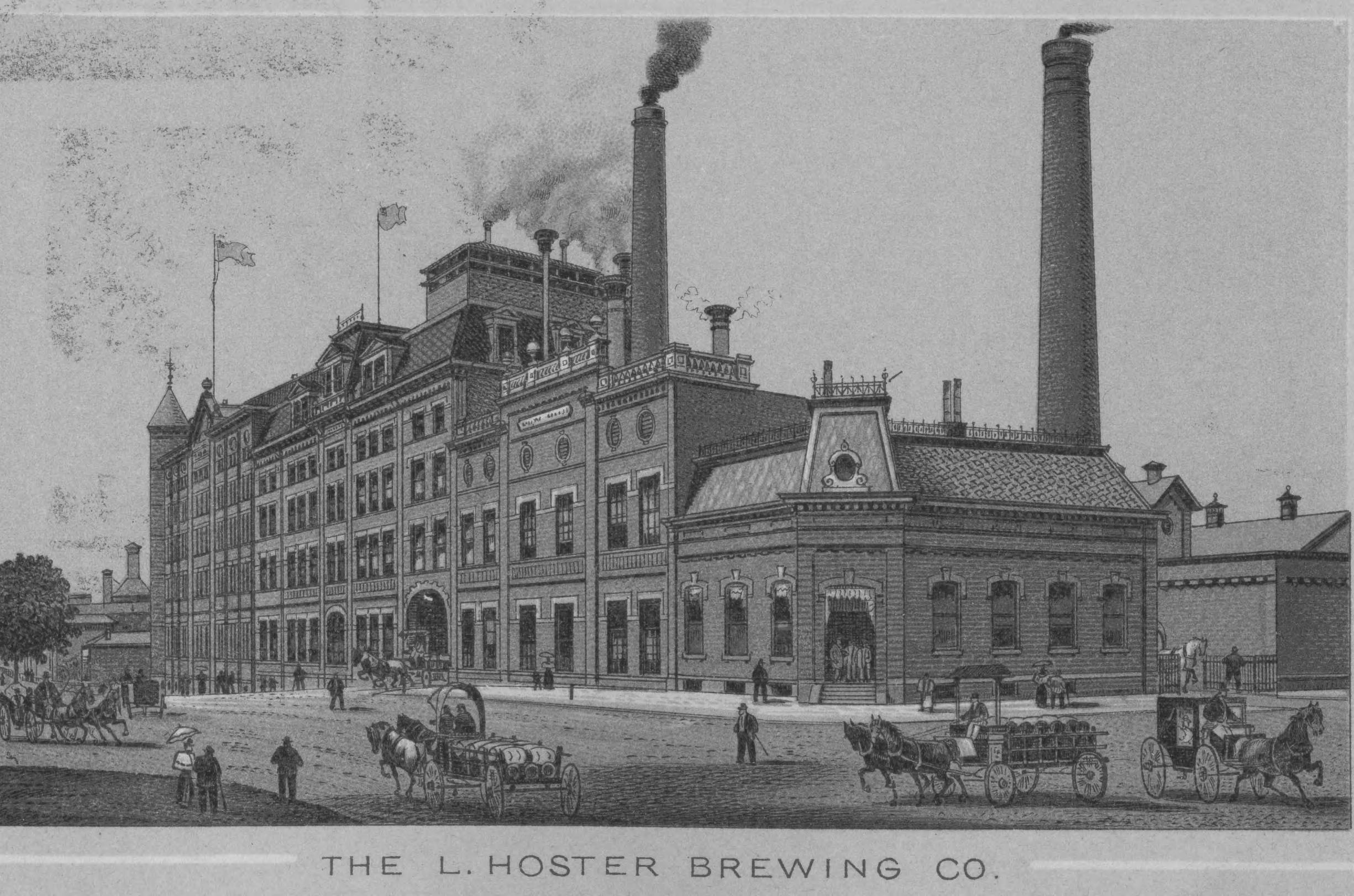
The brewery from Front St. c. 1893

The brewing company was established in 1836 in the present-day Brewery District. It grew to encompass numerous buildings. By 1892, it became the leading Columbus brewery and a household name in Ohio. Around 1920, Prohibition began to hinder the industry, and the brewery created soda and imitation beer products, though without success, forcing its closure.

A portion of the building, facing Front Street, was demolished for "future development" in 1965, by S.G. Loewendick & Sons.

=== Legacy ===
A brewpub acquired the name "Hoster Brewing Company" in 1989, opening that year in the High Line Car House at 55 S. High St. The brewery served numerous beers, including the historic "Gold Top" lager brew, a new but similar recipe. It began distributing to local restaurants in 1991. The brewery shut down in 2001, and its assets were purchased by another brewer in 2004. The brewer began distributing the flagship beer again in 2005, utilizing regional breweries. In 2011, the Hoster Brewing Company moved to a 26,000-square-foot space in the Near East Side. The company will open a brewery and taproom near the John Glenn Columbus International Airport in June 2023.

The remaining brewery buildings are set to be redeveloped into a complex called Front & Fulton. The project was announced in 2019 and estimated at the time to cost $77 million, including a boutique hotel, rooftop bar, restaurants, as well as event, office, and retail space. The buildings received $5 million in Ohio historic preservation tax credits in 2019. It was planned for the former Wasserstrom store to be removed and replaced with a seven-story hotel. In 2021, the project was updated to a cost of $105 million, with 40 apartments and similar other uses, including four to five bars, restaurants, and coffee shops; the hotel was cut from the plan and replaced with a two-story restaurant and office space with a rooftop bar. The estimated completion date was moved from 2021 to summer 2023.

== See also ==
- National Register of Historic Places listings in Columbus, Ohio
