= Culture of Columbus, Ohio =

The culture of Columbus, Ohio, is particularly known for museums, performing arts, sporting events, seasonal fairs and festivals, and architecture of various styles from Greek Revival to modern architecture.

== Landmarks ==
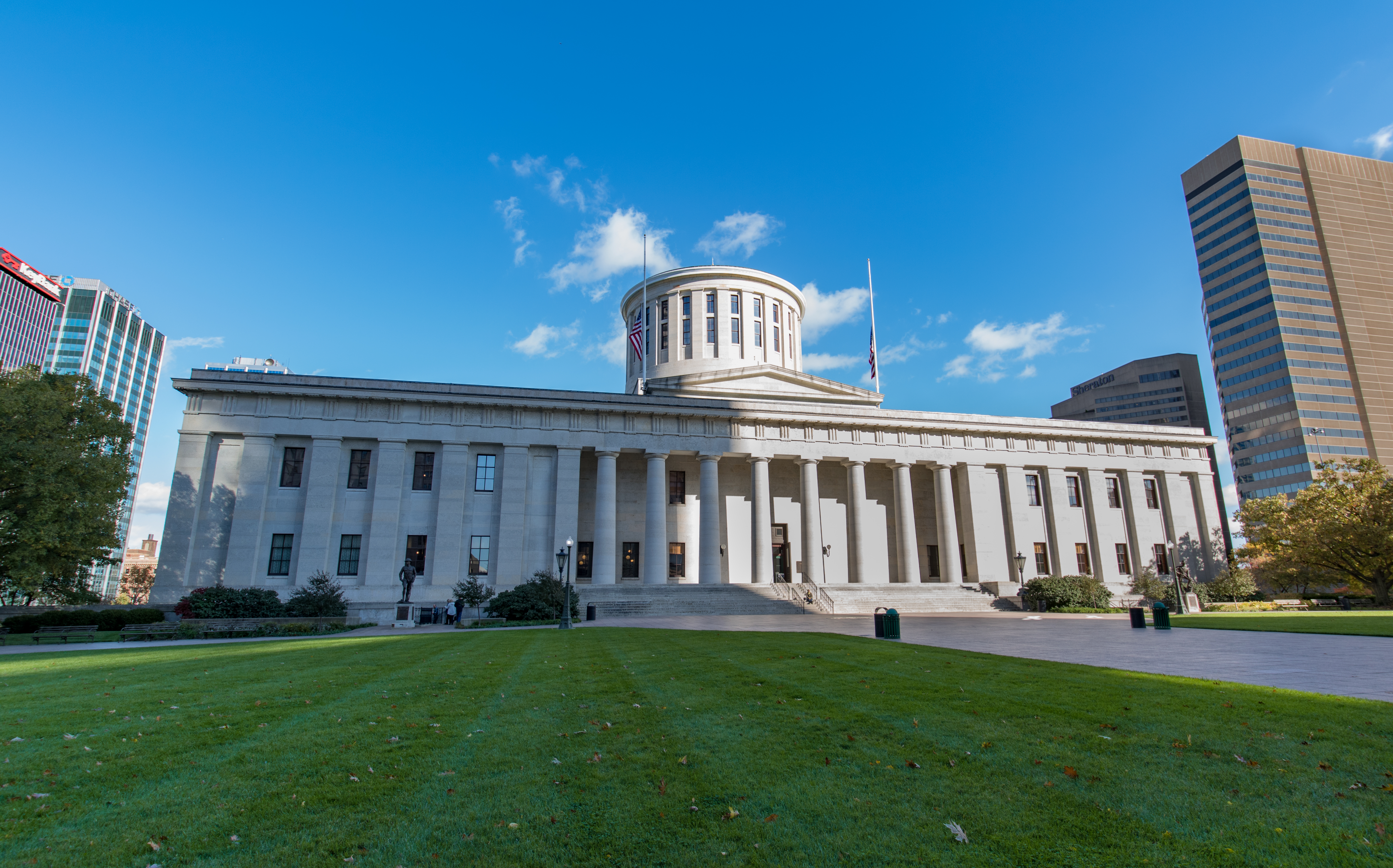
The Ohio Statehouse

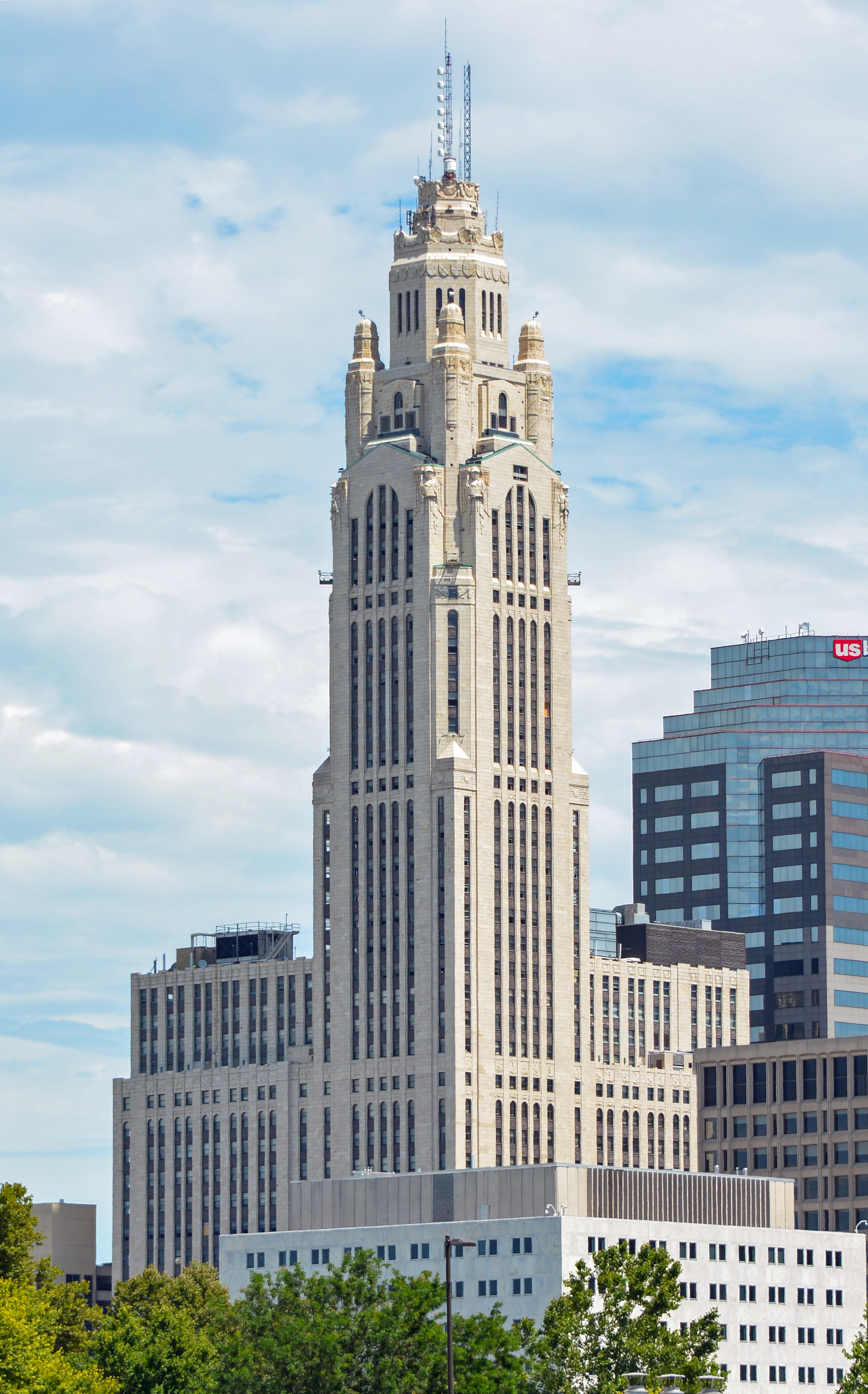
LeVeque Tower, Downtown

Columbus has many notable buildings, including the Ohio Statehouse, the Ohio Judicial Center, and Greater Columbus Convention Center, Rhodes State Office Tower, LeVeque Tower, and One Nationwide Plaza.

Construction of the Ohio Statehouse began in 1839 on a 10-acre (4 ha) plot of land donated by four prominent Columbus landowners. This plot formed Capitol Square, which was not part of the city's original layout. Built of Columbus limestone from the Marble Cliff Quarry Co., the Statehouse stands on foundations 18 feet (5.5 m) deep, laid by prison labor gangs rumored to have been composed largely of masons jailed for minor infractions. It features a central recessed porch with a colonnade of a forthright and primitive Greek Doric mode. A broad and low central pediment supports the windowed astylar drum under an invisibly low saucer dome that lights the interior rotunda. There are several artworks within and outside the building, including the William McKinley Monument dedicated in 1907. Unlike many U.S. state capitol buildings, the Ohio State Capitol owes little to the architecture of the national Capitol. During the Statehouse's 22 year construction, seven architects were employed. The Statehouse was opened to the legislature and the public in 1857 and completed in 1861. It is at the intersection of Broad and High Streets in downtown Columbus.

Established in 1848, Green Lawn Cemetery is one of the largest cemeteries in the Midwestern United States.

Within the Driving Park heritage district lies the original home of Eddie Rickenbacker, the World War I fighter pilot ace. Built in 1895, the house was designated a National Historic Landmark in 1976.

== Museums and public art ==
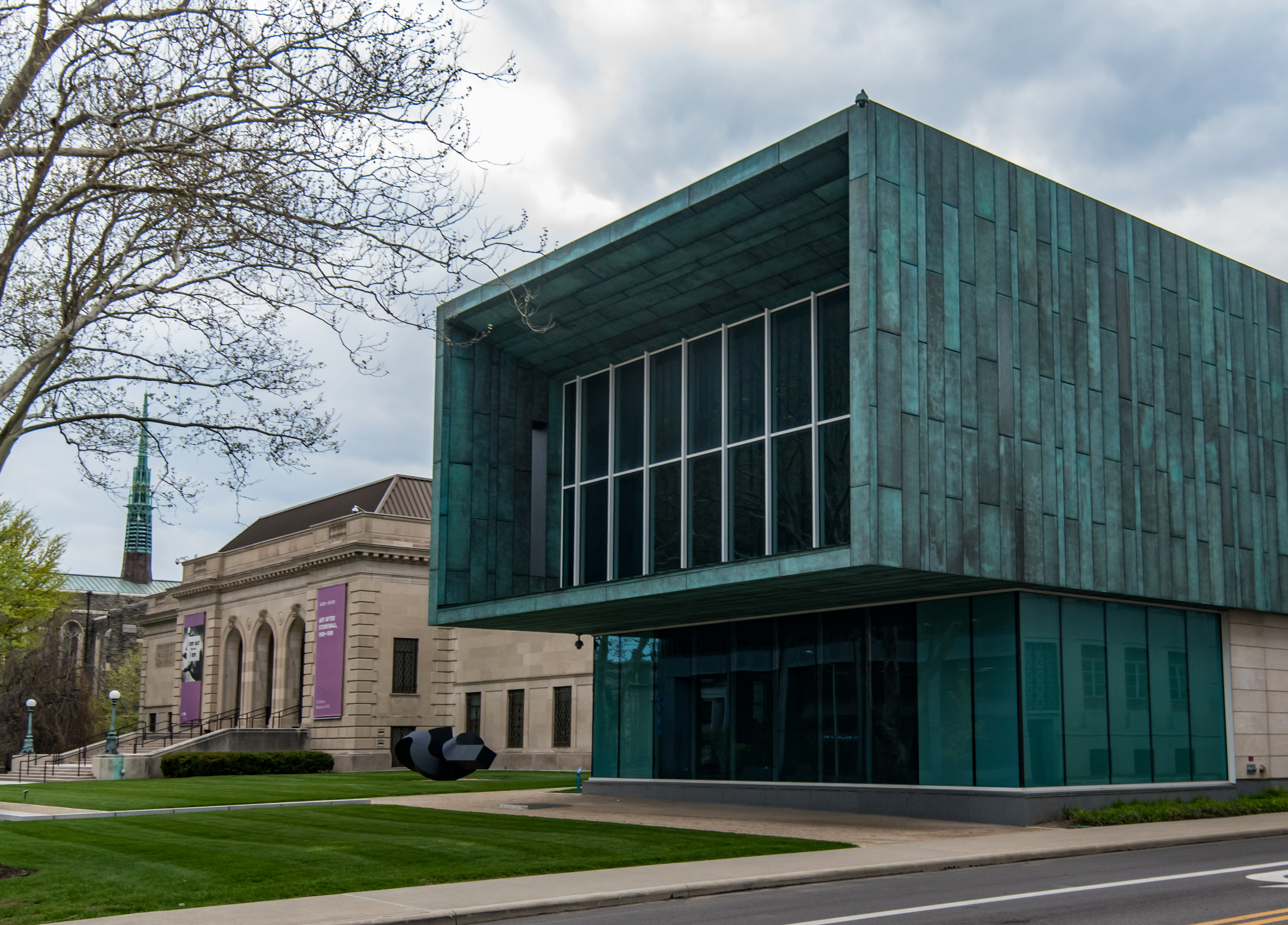
Columbus Museum of Art

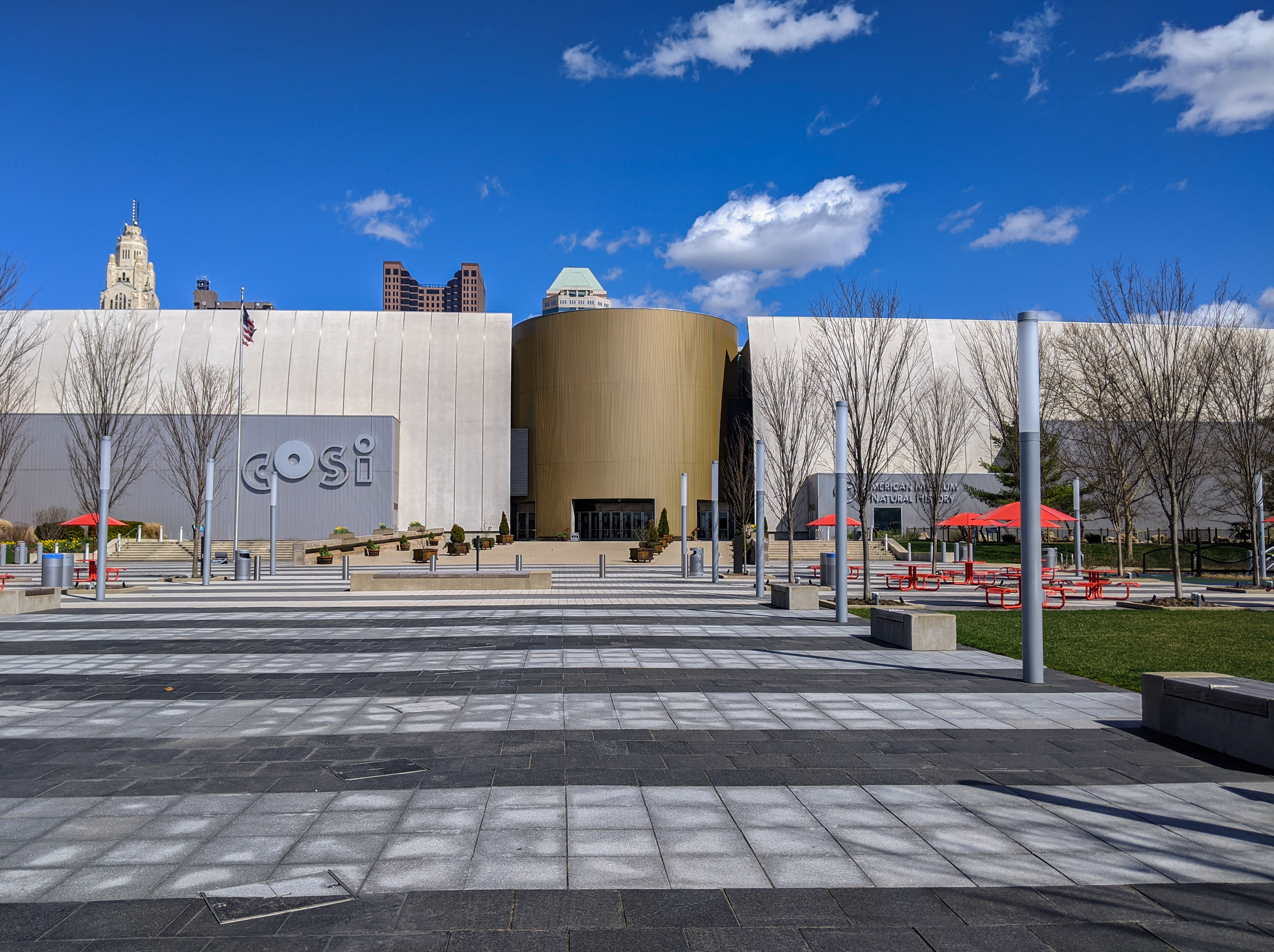
COSI, a science and children's museum

Columbus has a wide variety of museums and galleries. Its primary art museum is the Columbus Museum of Art, which operates its main location as well as the Pizzuti Collection, featuring contemporary art. The museum, founded in 1878, focuses on European and American art up to early modernism that includes extraordinary examples of Impressionism, German Expressionism, and Cubism. Another prominent art museum in the city is the Wexner Center for the Arts, a contemporary art gallery and research facility operated by the Ohio State University.

The Ohio History Connection is headquartered in Columbus, with its flagship museum, the 250,000-square-foot (23,000 m^{2}) Ohio History Center, 4 mi (6.4 km) north of downtown. Adjacent to the museum is Ohio Village, a replica of a village around the time of the American Civil War. The Columbus Historical Society also features historical exhibits, focused more closely on life in Columbus.

COSI is a large science and children's museum in downtown Columbus. The present building, the former Central High School, was completed in November 1999, opposite downtown on the west bank of the River. In 2009, Parents magazine named COSI one of the ten best science centers for families in the country. Other science museums include the Orton Geological Museum and the Museum of Biological Diversity, both part of the Ohio State University.

The Franklin Park Conservatory is the city's botanical garden, opened in 1895. It features over 400 species of plants in a large Victorian-style glass greenhouse building that includes rain forest, desert, and Himalayan mountain biomes. The conservatory is located just east of Downtown in Franklin Park

Biographical museums include the Thurber House (documenting the life of cartoonist James Thurber), the Jack Nicklaus Museum (documenting the golfer's career, located on the OSU campus), and the Kelton House Museum and Garden. The Kelton House historic house museum memorializes three generations of the Kelton family, the house's use as a documented station on the Underground Railroad, and overall Victorian life.

The National Veterans Memorial and Museum, opened in 2018, focuses on the personal stories of military veterans throughout U.S. history. The museum replaced the Franklin County Veterans Memorial, opened in 1955.

Other notable museums in the city include the Central Ohio Fire Museum, Billy Ireland Cartoon Library & Museum, and the Ohio Craft Museum.

== Places of worship ==
According to Sperling's, 37.6% of Columbus residents are religious. Of this group, 15.7% identify as Protestant, 13.7% as Catholic, 1.5% as Jewish, 0.6% as Muslim, and 0.5% as Mormon. Places of worship include Vineyard, the Glenwood United Methodist Church, Broad Street United Methodist Church, Second Presbyterian Church, St. Paul's Episcopal Church, Shiloh Baptist Church, Roman Catholic Church's St. Joseph's Cathedral, the Greek Orthodox Church's Annunciation Cathedral, Mormon Columbus Ohio Temple, the Muslim Noor Islamic Cultural Center, and the Reform Jewish Temple Israel, the oldest synagogue in Columbus.

Megachurches include the World Harvest Church located in a southeast suburb.

Religious teaching institutions include the Trinity Lutheran Seminary, Bexley Hall Episcopal Seminary, Methodist Theological School in Ohio, and the Pontifical College Josephinum.

== Performing arts ==
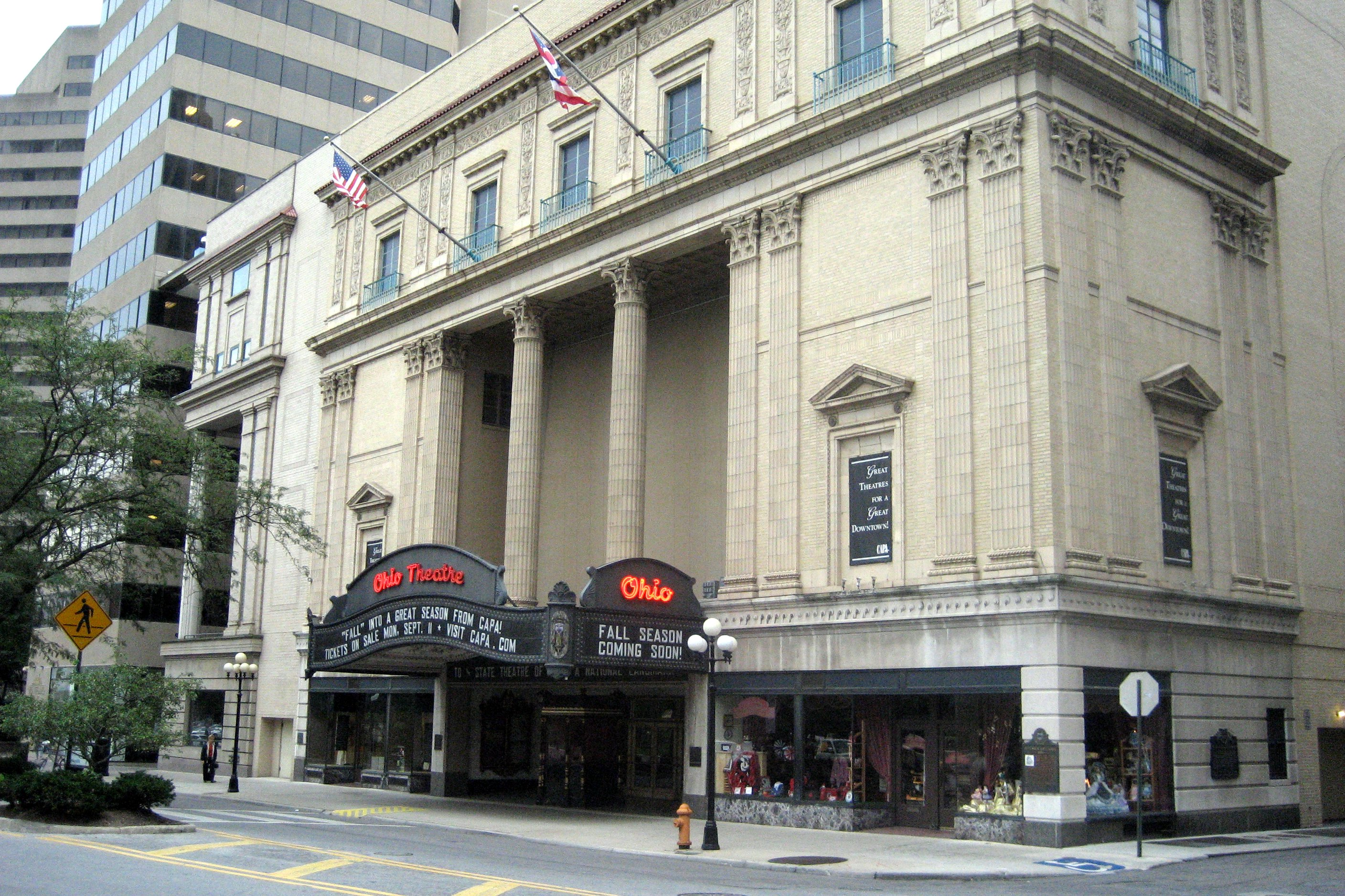
The Ohio Theatre is a National Historic Landmark.

Columbus is the home of many performing arts institutions including the Columbus Symphony Orchestra, Opera Columbus, BalletMet Columbus, the ProMusica Chamber Orchestra, The Contemporary Theatre of Ohio, Columbus Children's Theatre, Shadowbox Cabaret, and the Columbus Jazz Orchestra. Throughout the summer, the Actors' Theatre of Columbus offers free performances of Shakespearean plays in an open-air amphitheater in Schiller Park in historic German Village.

The Columbus Youth Ballet Academy was founded in the 1980s by ballerina and artistic director Shir Lee Wu, a discovery of Martha Graham. Wu is now the artistic director of the Columbus City Ballet School.

Columbus has several large concert venues, including the Nationwide Arena, Jerome Schottenstein Center, Express Live!, Mershon Auditorium, and the Newport Music Hall.

In May 2009, the Lincoln Theatre, formerly a center for Black culture in Columbus, reopened after an extensive restoration. Not far from the Lincoln Theatre is the King Arts Complex, which hosts a variety of cultural events. The city also has several theaters downtown, including the historic Palace Theatre, the Ohio Theatre, and the Southern Theatre. Broadway Across America often presents touring Broadway musicals in these larger venues. The Vern Riffe Center for Government and the Arts houses the Capitol Theatre and three smaller studio theaters, providing a home for resident performing arts companies.

=== Broadway ===
Broadway shows that have toured Columbus include Mamma Mia!, Cats, The Lion King, Annie, Beauty and the Beast, 42nd Street, Les Misérables, Wicked, Riverdance, Spamalot, Grease, Hairspray and many more.

=== Film ===
Movies filmed in the Columbus metropolitan area include Teachers in 1984, Tango & Cash in 1989, Little Man Tate in 1991, Air Force One in 1997, Traffic in 2000, Speak in 2004, Bubble in 2005, and Parker in 2013.

== Sports ==
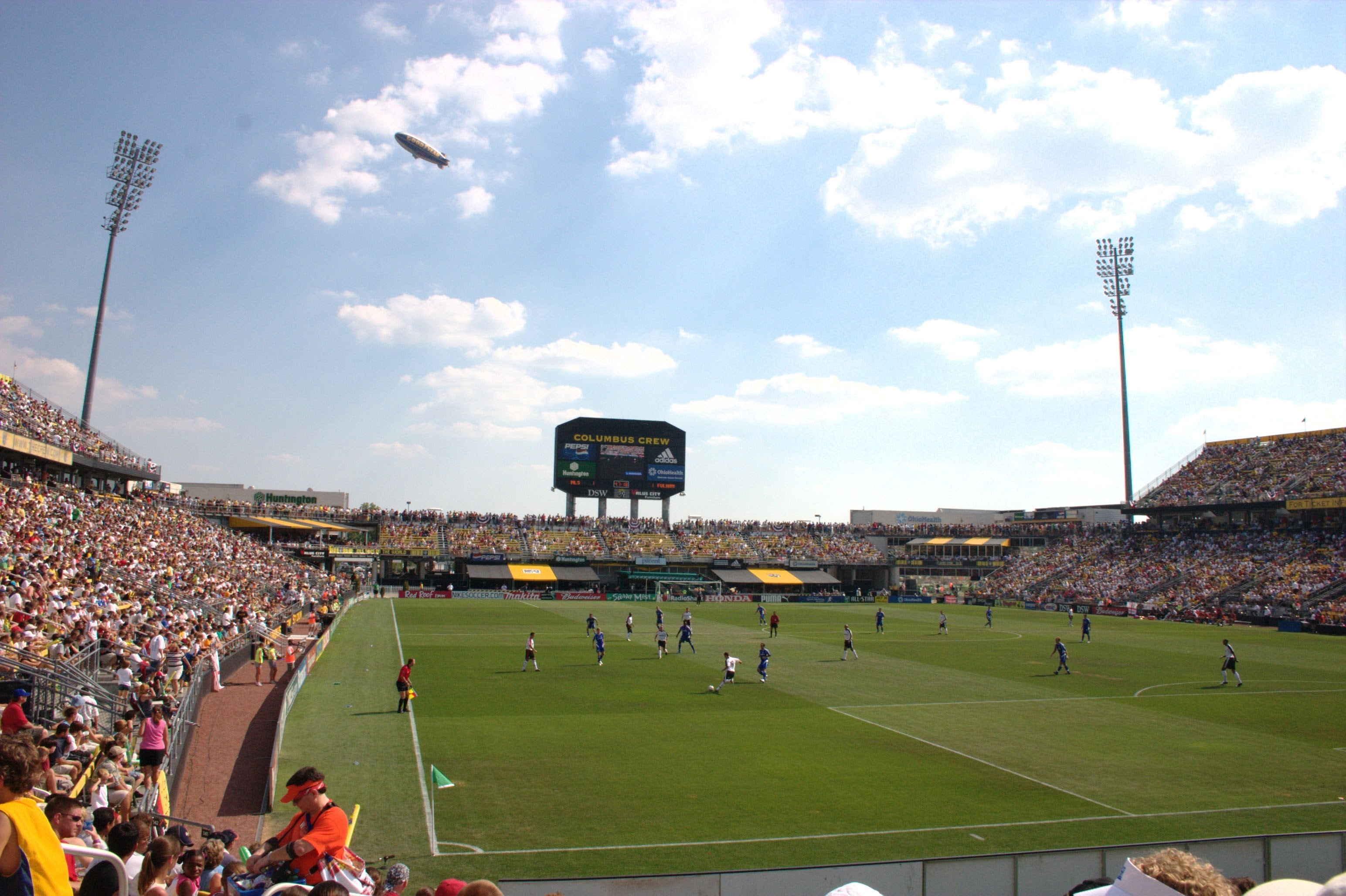
Crew Stadium, the first ever soccer-only stadium in the U.S., and home to the 2008 MLS Cup champions Columbus Crew

=== Professional athletics ===
Columbus has professional sports teams in hockey, association football (soccer), and minor league baseball. The Columbus Blue Jackets of the National Hockey League play at Nationwide Arena. The Columbus Destroyers of the defunct Arena Football League played there as well until the league's demise. The Columbus Crew of Major League Soccer play at their own stadium, Columbus Crew Stadium, which was the first Soccer-specific stadium built in the United States. The Crew were one of the original members of the MLS, and have recently won their first MLS Cup in 2008. The Columbus Clippers, Triple A affiliate of the Cleveland Guardians (formerly a long-time affiliate of the New York Yankees through 2006, and the Washington Nationals through 2008), previously hosting their games at Cooper Stadium but now play in a new ballpark in the Arena District named Huntington Park, which opened in April, 2009. Until the arrival of the Columbus Crew in 1996, Columbus was the largest city in the United States without a franchise in a major professional sports league, a distinction now held by the city of Austin, Texas. Columbus is also one of few cities in the United States which is home to a Team Handball club, the Columbus Armada.

The city was home to the Tigers football team from 1901 to 1926. In the 1990s the Columbus Quest won the only two championships during American Basketball League's existence.

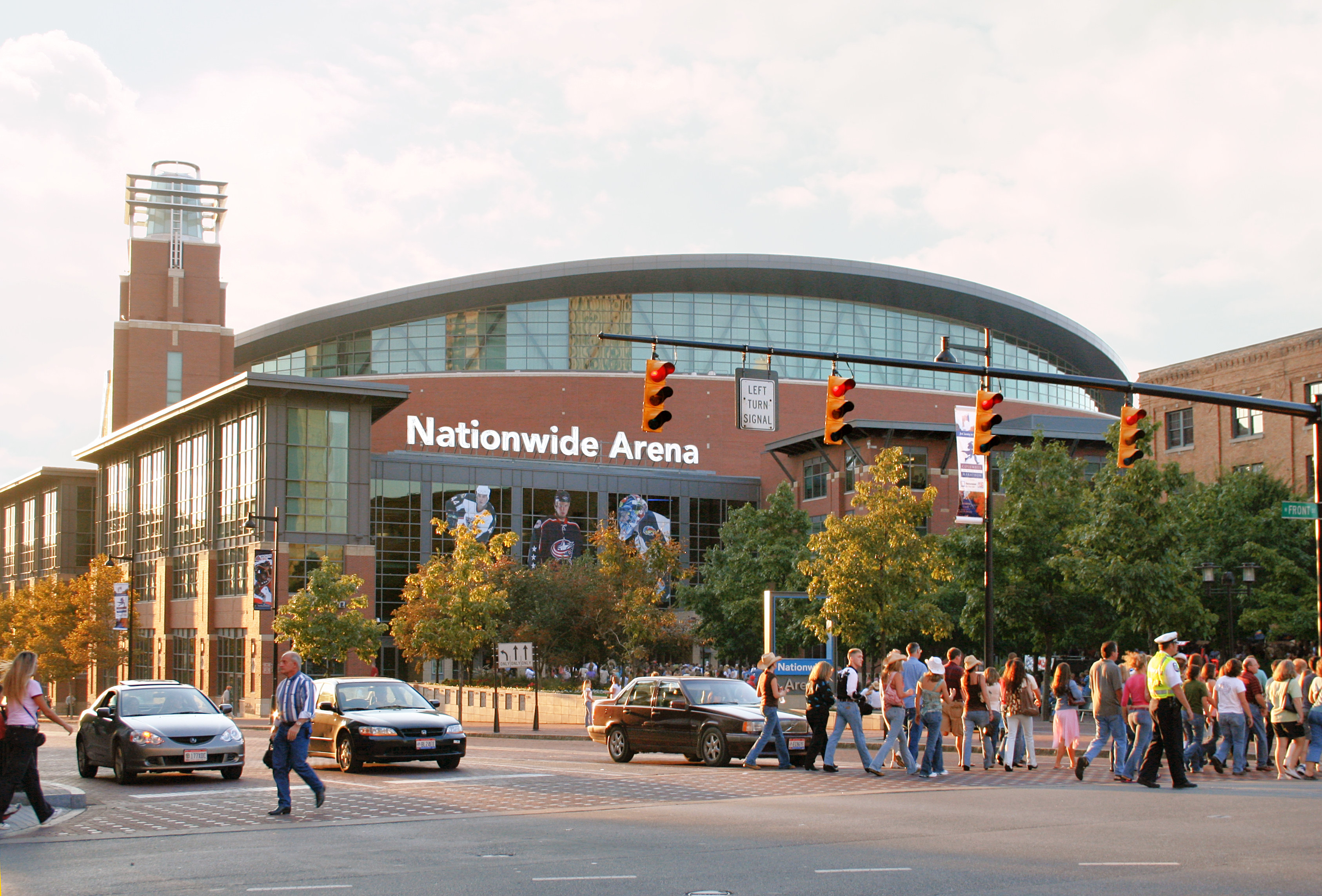
Nationwide Arena, home of the NHL's Columbus Blue Jackets, Arena District

=== Fitness and martial arts ===
Columbus hosts the annual Arnold Classic fitness expo and competition in early March. Hosted by Arnold Schwarzenegger, the event has grown to eight Olympic sports and 12,000 athletes competing in 20 events. Schwarzenegger has been visiting Columbus for almost 40 years, and has substantial commercial investments in the metropolitan area. In conjunction with the Arnold Classic, the city hosted three consecutive Ultimate Fighting Championships events between 2007-2009.

=== Auto racing ===
Automotive racing star Jeff Gordon's company, Jeff Gordon Inc., along with Arshot Investment Corp., have plans to construct the Center for Automotive Research & Technology at Cooper Park, a proposed racing venue and center just west of downtown. Rahal Letterman Lanigan Racing, a business venture owned by Indianapolis 500 winner Bobby Rahal, television personality David Letterman, and entrepreneur Mike Lanigan, is based in the Columbus metropolitan area.

Columbus has a long history in motorsports, hosting the world's first 24 hour car race at the Columbus Driving Park in 1905, organized by the Columbus Auto Club. The Columbus Motor Speedway was built in 1945 and held their first motorcycle race in 1946. In 2010 the Ohio State University student-built Buckeye Bullet 2, a fuel cell vehicle, set a FIA world speed record for electric vehicles in reaching 307.7 mph (495.20 km/h), eclipsing the previous record of 245.5 mph (395.09 km/h).

=== Equestrian ===
The annual All American Quarter Horse Congress, the largest single breed horse show in the world is held at the Ohio Expo Center each October and attracts approximately 500,000 visitors annually.

=== Ohio State athletics ===
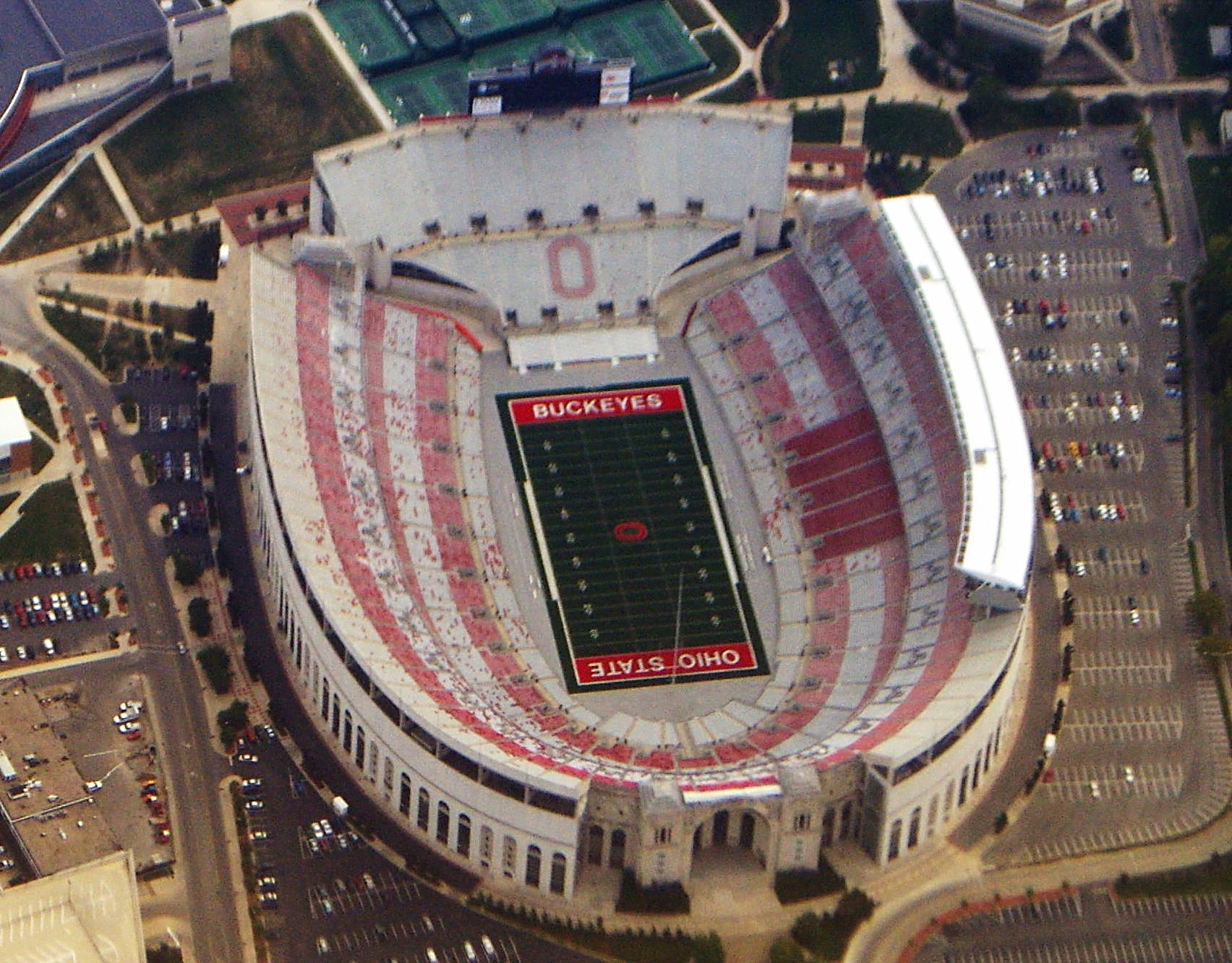
The Ohio Stadium, on the OSU Campus, is the 7th-largest non-racing stadium in the world and one of the largest football stadiums in the United States.

Columbus is home to Ohio State University athletics, one of the most competitive collegiate programs in the nation. The institution has placed in the top-10 final standings of the Director's Cup, headquartered in Cleveland, five times since 2000-2001, including #3 for the 2002-2003 season, #4 for the 2003-2004 season, while being ranked #2 toward the close of the 2009-2010 season before ultimately finishing #8. The university fully funds 36 varsity teams, consisting of 17 male, 16 female, and three co-educational teams. In 2007-2008 and 2008–2009, the program generated the second-most revenue for college programs behind the University of Texas.

The Ohio State Buckeyes are a member of the NCAA's Big Ten Conference, and the football team plays home games at Ohio Stadium. The OSU-Michigan football game (known colloquially as "The Game") is the final game of the regular season and is played in November each year, alternating between Columbus and Ann Arbor, Michigan. In 2000, ESPN ranked the OSU-Michigan game as the greatest rivalry in North American sports. Moreover, "Buckeye fever" permeates Columbus culture year-round and forms a major part of Columbus's cultural identity. Businessman and former New York Yankees owner George Steinbrenner, an Ohio native who studied at Ohio State at one point and who coached in Columbus, was a big Ohio State football fan and donor to the university, having contributed for the construction of the band facility at the renovated Ohio Stadium, which bears his family's name.

During the winter months, the Buckeyes basketball team is also a major sporting attraction.

=== Fairs and festivals ===
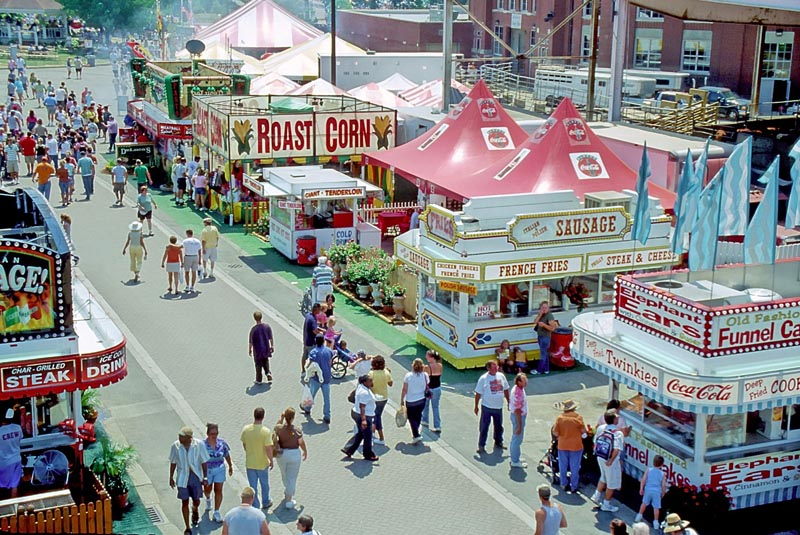
The Ohio State Fair is held in late July to early August.

Annual festivities in Columbus include the Ohio State Fair—one of the largest state fairs in the country—as well as the Columbus Arts festival and the Jazz and Ribs Festival, both of which occur on the downtown riverfront.

In the middle of May, Columbus is home to Rock on the Range, marketed as America's biggest rock festival. The festival, which takes place on a Friday, Saturday, and Sunday, has hosted Metallica, Red Hot Chili Peppers, Slipknot, and other notable bands.

During the first weekend in June, the bars of Columbus's North Market District host the Park Street Festival, which attracts thousands of visitors to a massive party in bars and on the street. June's second-to-last weekend sees one of the Midwest's largest gay pride parades, reflecting the city's sizable gay population. During the last weekend of June, Goodale Park hosts ComFest (short for "Community Festival"), an immense three-day music festival marketed as the largest non-commercial festival in the U.S., with art vendors, live music on multiple stages, hundreds of local social and political organizations, body painting, and beer.

Greek Festival is held in August or September at the Greek Orthodox Church downtown.

The Hot Times festival, a celebration of music, arts, food, and diversity, is held annually in the Olde Towne East neighborhood.

The city's largest dining events, Restaurant Week Columbus, are held in mid-July and mid-January. In 2010, more than 40,000 diners went to 40 participating restaurants, and $5,000 was donated the Mid-Ohio Foodbank on behalf of sponsors and participating restaurants.

The Juneteenth Ohio Festival is held each year at Franklin Park on Father's Day weekend. Started by Mustafaa Shabazz, JuneteenthOhio is one of the largest African American festivals in the United States, including three full days of music, food, dance, and entertainment by local and national recording artists. The festival holds a Father's Day celebration, honoring local fathers.

Around the Fourth of July, Columbus hosts Red, White, and Boom! on the Scioto riverfront downtown, attracting crowds of over 500,000 people and featuring the largest fireworks display in the Midwest. The namesake of similar celebrations nationwide, the first originated in Columbus in 1981. The Doo Dah Parade is also held at this time.

During Memorial Day Weekend, the Asian Festival is held in Franklin Park. Hundreds of restaurants, vendors, and companies open up booths, traditional music, and martial arts are performed, and cultural exhibits are set up.

The Jazz and Rib Fest is a free downtown event held each July featuring jazz artists like Randy Weston, D. Bohannon Clark, and Wayne Shorter, along with rib vendors from around the country.

The Short North is host to the monthly "Gallery Hop", which attracts hundreds to the neighborhood's art galleries (which all open their doors to the public until late at night) and street musicians. The Hilltop Bean Dinner is an annual event held on Columbus's West Side that celebrates the city's Civil War heritage near the historic Camp Chase Cemetery. At the end of September, German Village throws an annual Oktoberfest celebration that features German food, beer, music, and crafts.

The Short North also hosts HighBall Halloween, Masquerade on High, a fashion show and street parade that closes down High Street. In 2011, in its fourth year, HighBall Halloween gained notoriety as it accepted its first Expy award. HighBall Halloween has much to offer for those interested in fashion and the performing and visual arts or for those who want to celebrate Halloween with food and drinks from all around the city. Each year the event is put on with a different theme.

Columbus also hosts many conventions in the Greater Columbus Convention Center, a pastel-colored deconstructivist building on the north edge of downtown that resembles jumbled blocks, or a train yard from overhead. Completed in 1993, the 1.7 million square feet (160,000 m^{2}) convention center was designed by architect Peter Eisenman, who also designed the Wexner Center.

With Nightmares Film Festival, Columbus hosts an annual film festival for horror and genre films. It is frequently cited as one of the most influential genre film festivals in the USA.
