= Statue of Friedrich Schiller (Columbus, Ohio) =

Statue in Columbus, Ohio, U.S.

Friedrich Schiller
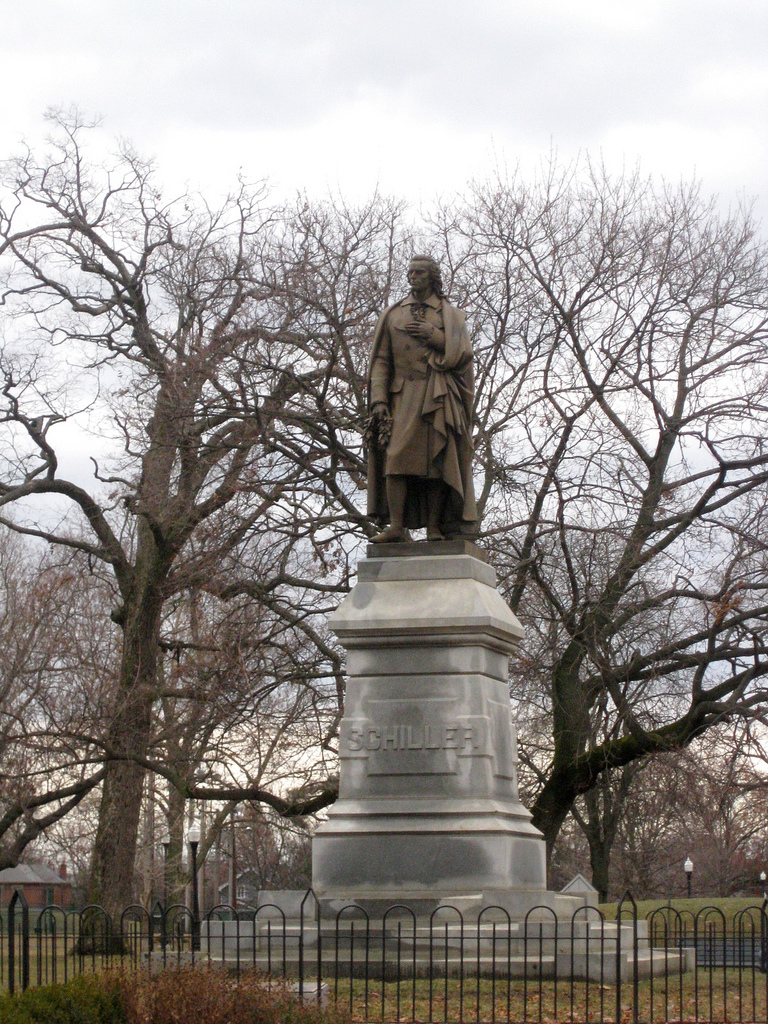
- The statue in 2008
- Artist: Max von Widnmann
- Medium: Bronze sculpture
- Subject: Friedrich Schiller
- Location: Columbus, Ohio, United States; 39°56′31.4″N 82°59′36.8″W

A statue of Friedrich Schiller by Max von Widnmann stands in Schiller Park, in Columbus, Ohio's German Village, in the United States.

== Description and history ==
The bronze sculpture is a second cast of the original designed by Widnmann, completed in 1863 and installed in Maximiliansplatz, Munich. The Columbus sculpture was completed in Germany in 1891, transported across the Atlantic Ocean, and erected by the German-Americans of Columbus on July 4. The sculpture was rededicated on July 4, 1991. In 2012, Friends of Schiller Park funded the installation of lights to illuminate the monument.

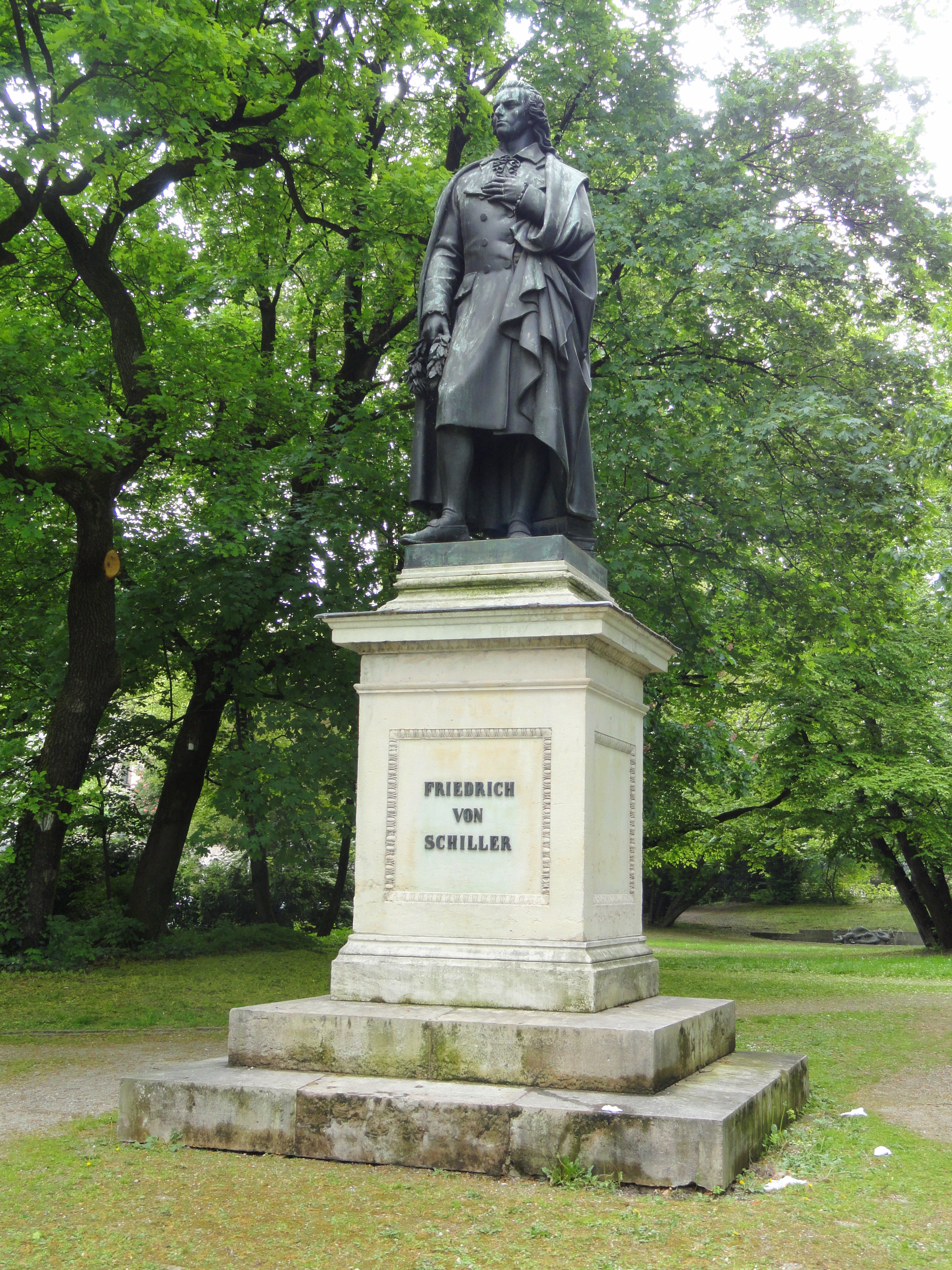
The statue in Munich
