= Actors Theater =

Actors Theater may refer to:

- Actors Theatre of Louisville, a non-profit performing arts theater located in downtown Louisville, Kentucky
- Actors' Theatre of Columbus, a performing arts theater troupe located in Columbus, Ohio
