= Umbrella Girl =

Sculpture in Columbus, Ohio, U.S.

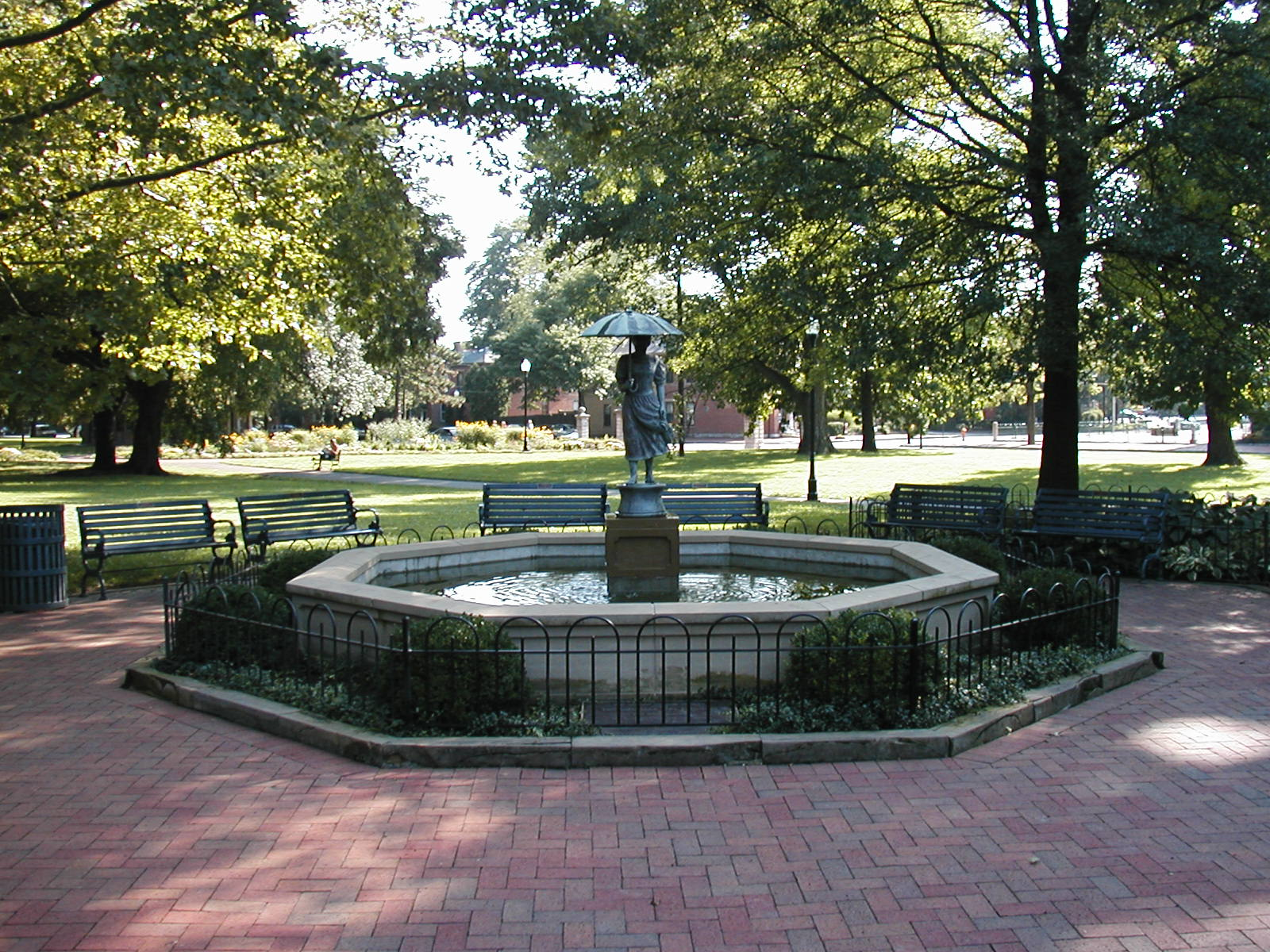
- Artist: Joan Wobst; Phil Kientz
- Year: 1996
- Location: Columbus, Ohio, United States
- 39°56′34″N 82°59′39″W

Umbrella Girl, or The Umbrella Girl Fountain, is a 1996 fountain and sculpture in Schiller Park's Grace Highfield Memorial Garden, in Columbus, Ohio's German Village neighborhood, in the United States. The copper fountain and sandstone pool were designed by Joan Wobst and Phil Kientz, respectively.

== History ==
The current fountain replaced one depicting Hebe, the Greek goddess of youth, installed as a drinking fountain in 1872. This fountain was relocated to a pond during the 1920s, and an umbrella was added. The statue disappeared during the 1950s. Local residents wanted to restore the original fountain and sculpture, resulting in the installation of the current structure in 1996. Every year, for the December holiday season, an anonymous member of the community drapes the statue in a red cloak.

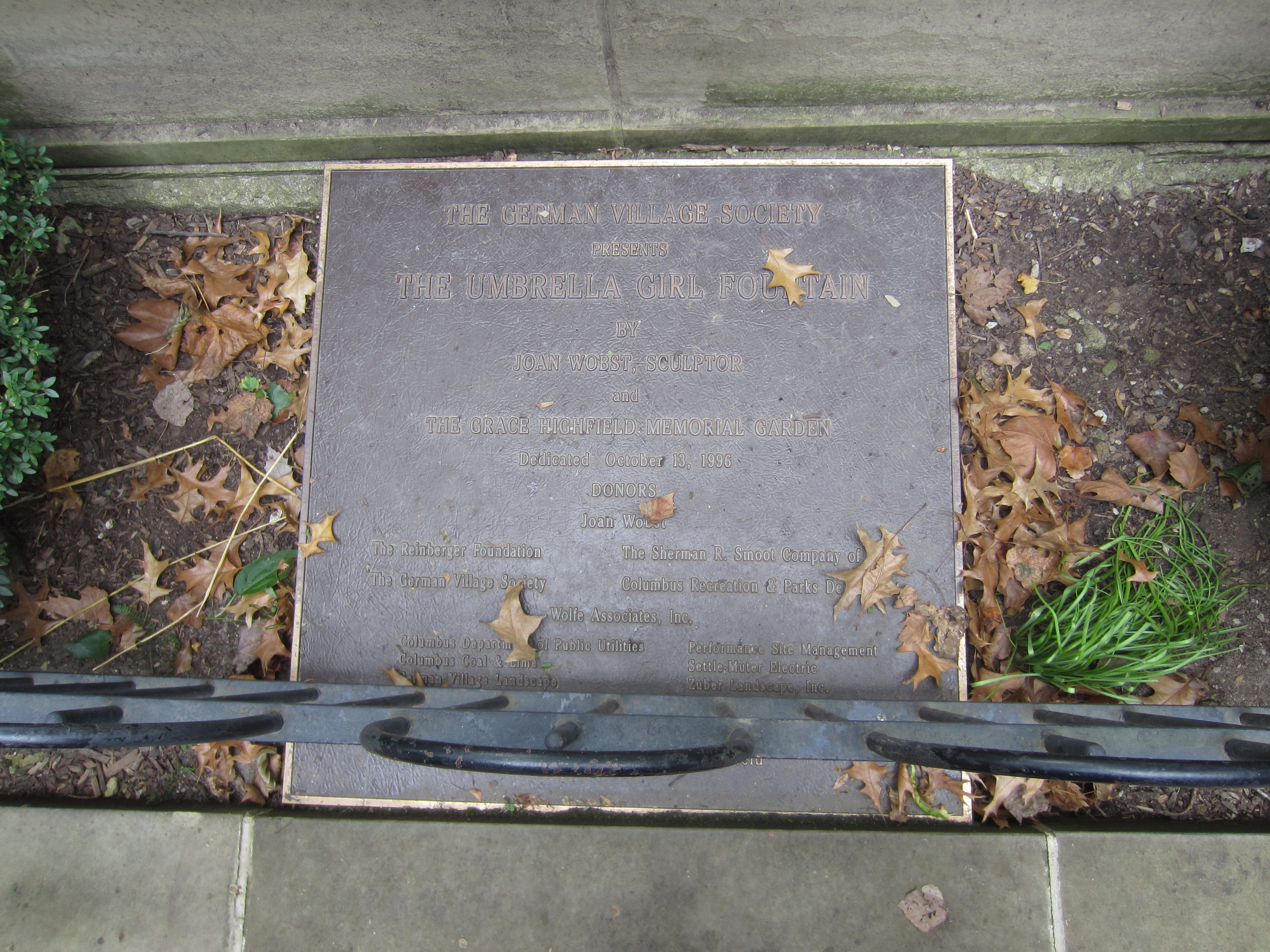
Plaque for the fountain

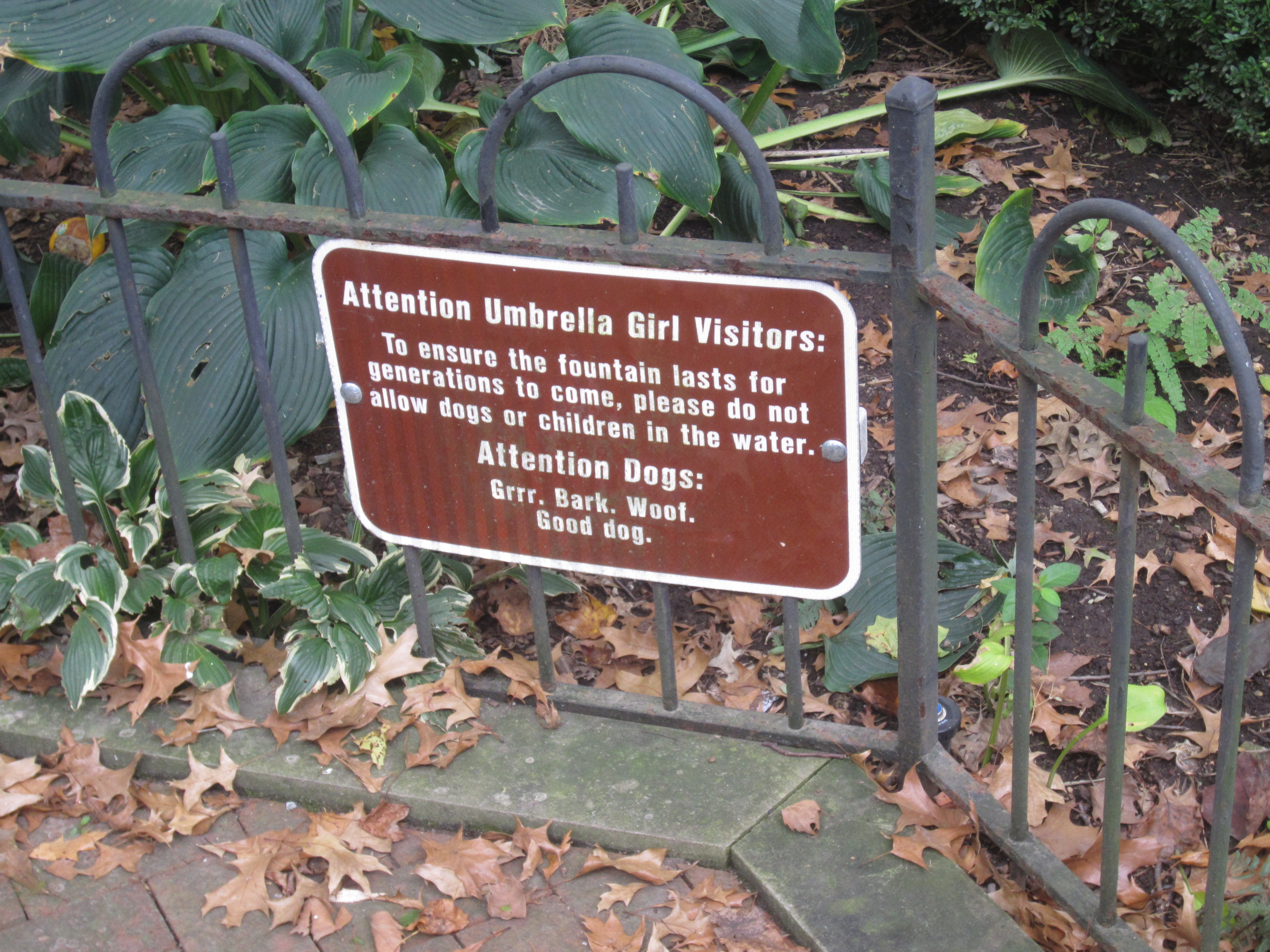
Signage near the fountain, 2018

== See also ==
- 1996 in art
