= Schiller Park (Columbus, Ohio) =

Park in Columbus, Ohio, U.S.

- Friedrich von Schiller Park
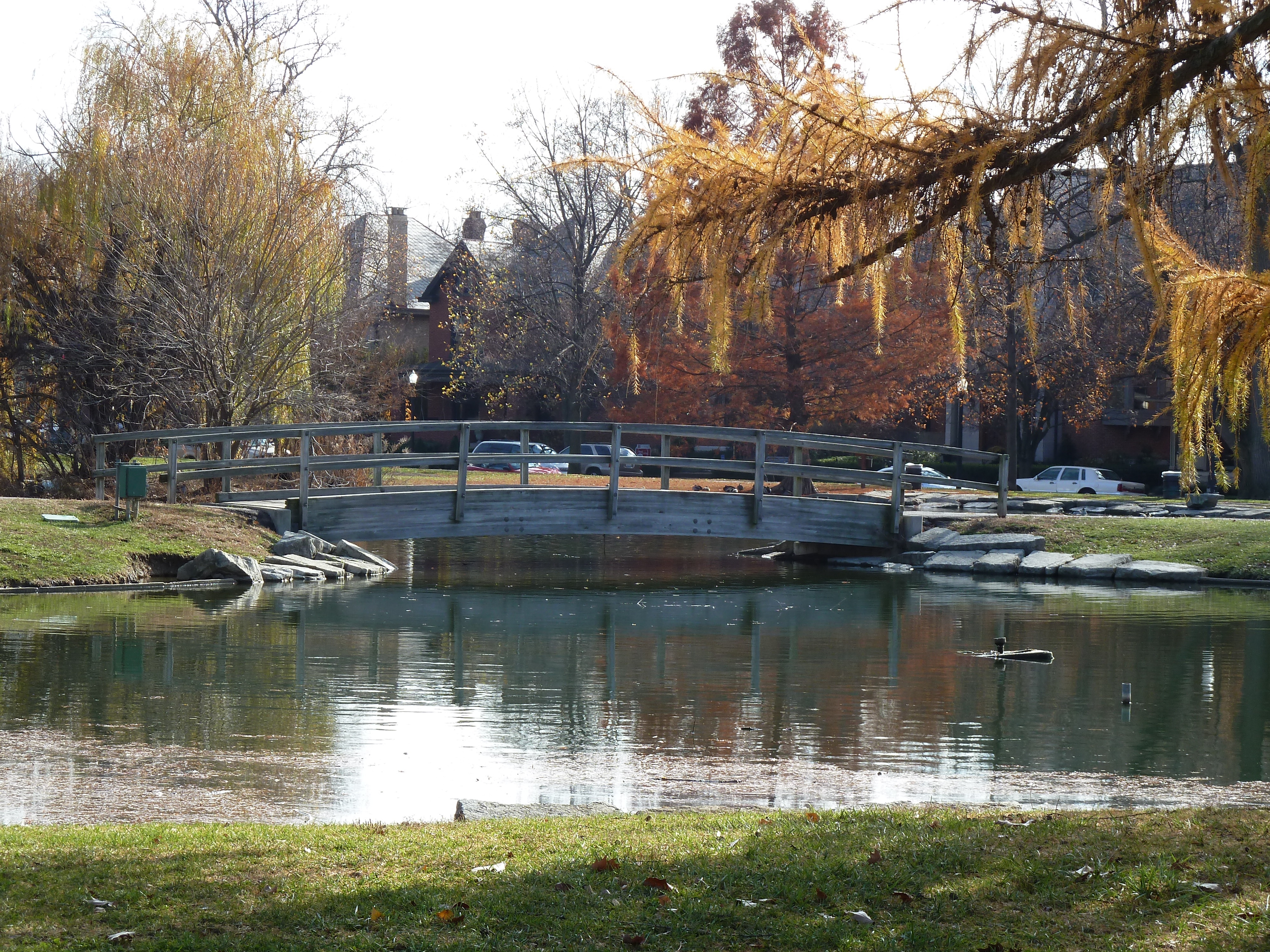
- Pond and bridge at Schiller Park
- Interactive map of Schiller Park
- Type: Public
- Location: 1069 Jaeger Street, German Village, Columbus, Ohio
- Coordinates: 39°56′31″N 82°59′34″W
- Area: 23.45 acres (9.49 ha)
- Administrator: Columbus Recreation and Parks Department
- Public transit: 5, 8 CoGo
- Website: Schiller Park

Schiller Park is a 23.45-acre (9.49 ha) municipal park located in German Village, a historic neighborhood in Columbus, Ohio. The park is bounded by Reinhard Avenue to the north, Jaeger Street to the east, East Deshler Avenue to the south, and City Park Avenue to the west.

== Description and history ==
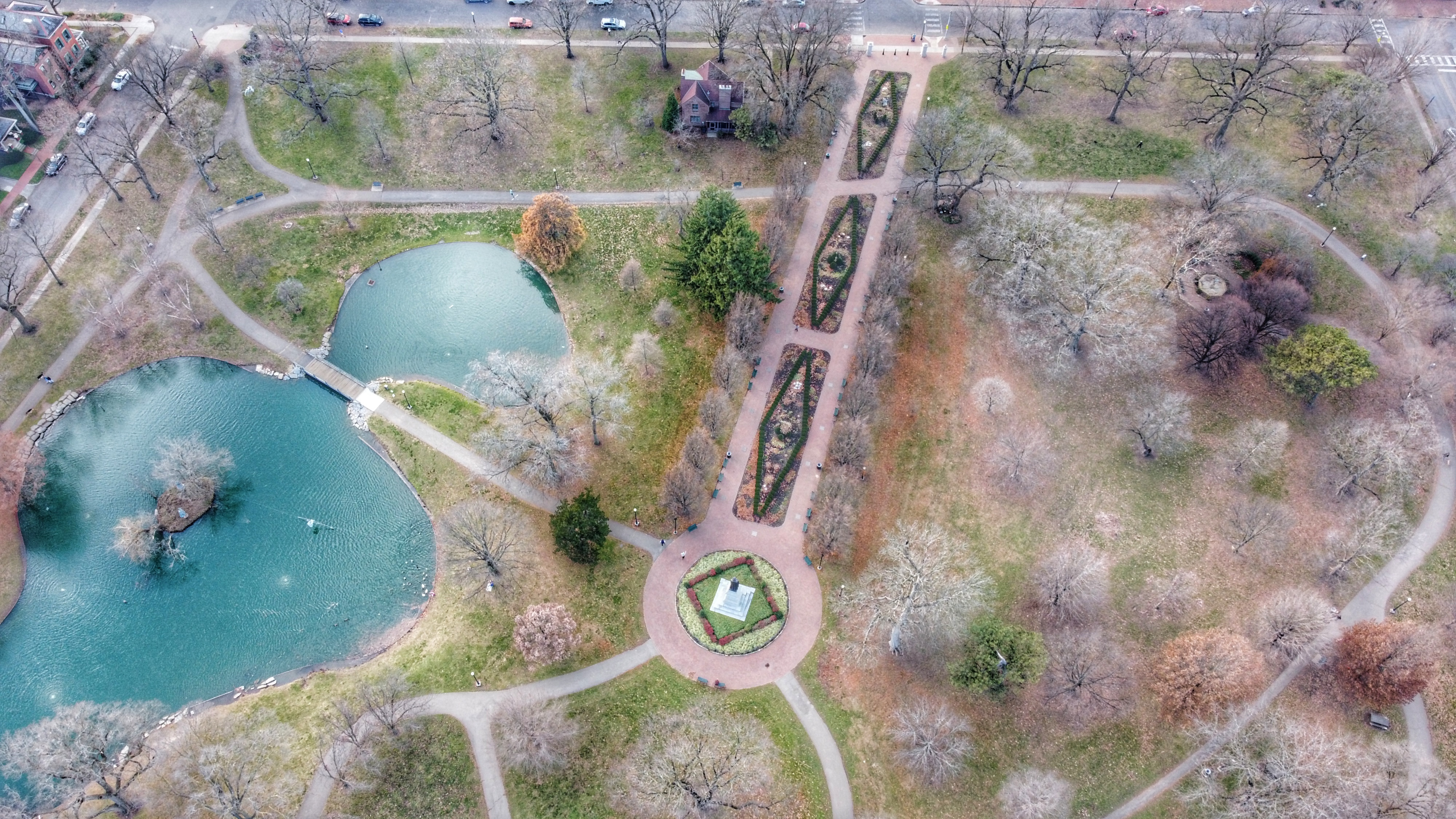
The park's pond, Huntington Gardens, and Schiller statue

During the nineteenth century, the land was originally owned by Francis Stewart and was known as "Stewart's Grove." It had been the area's center for festivals and neighborhood activities since the 1800s, including the Independence Day celebration of 1830 and Ohio State Fairs of 1864 and 1865. By 1866, David W. Deshler, his son William G. Deshler, and Allen G. Thurman purchased the property with the aim of having it permanently serve the public. Shortly afterwards, the City of Columbus purchased the park in April 1867 for $15,000 from the Deshlers and Thurman. Upon purchase, the park was renamed "The City Park" and is ranked as the second oldest park in the city following Goodale Park.

Between the middle and end of the nineteenth century, the area surrounding "City Park" became increasingly populated by German immigrants. On July 4, 1891 during a Fourth of July celebration, a statue of Johann Christoph Friedrich von Schiller (1759–1805) was dedicated to the park by the German-born residents. Friedrich von Schiller was a famous German poet, philosopher, historian, and playwright. The statue in German Village is a second casting of the original statue in Munich, Germany. The original statue was designed and executed by Max von Widnmann and unveiled in Munich on May 9, 1863, an anniversary of Friedrich von Schiller's death. The Columbus City Council passed Ordinance No. 22,233 on April 3, 1905 to rename "The City Park" to "Schiller Park" as a namesake.

The park, once a community meeting ground for the German settlement, is now the site of recreational facilities, gardens, and an amphitheater. Free live performances of Shakespearean plays are enacted during the summer months courtesy of Actors' Theatre of Columbus. Along the main entrance of the park, facing City Park Avenue, visitors are greeted by the Huntington Gardens that are sponsored by Huntington National Bank and maintained by volunteers. The park is also home to Umbrella Girl, dedicated to the citizens of German Village in October 1996 to replace Hebe, the missing original sculpture.

== Gallery ==
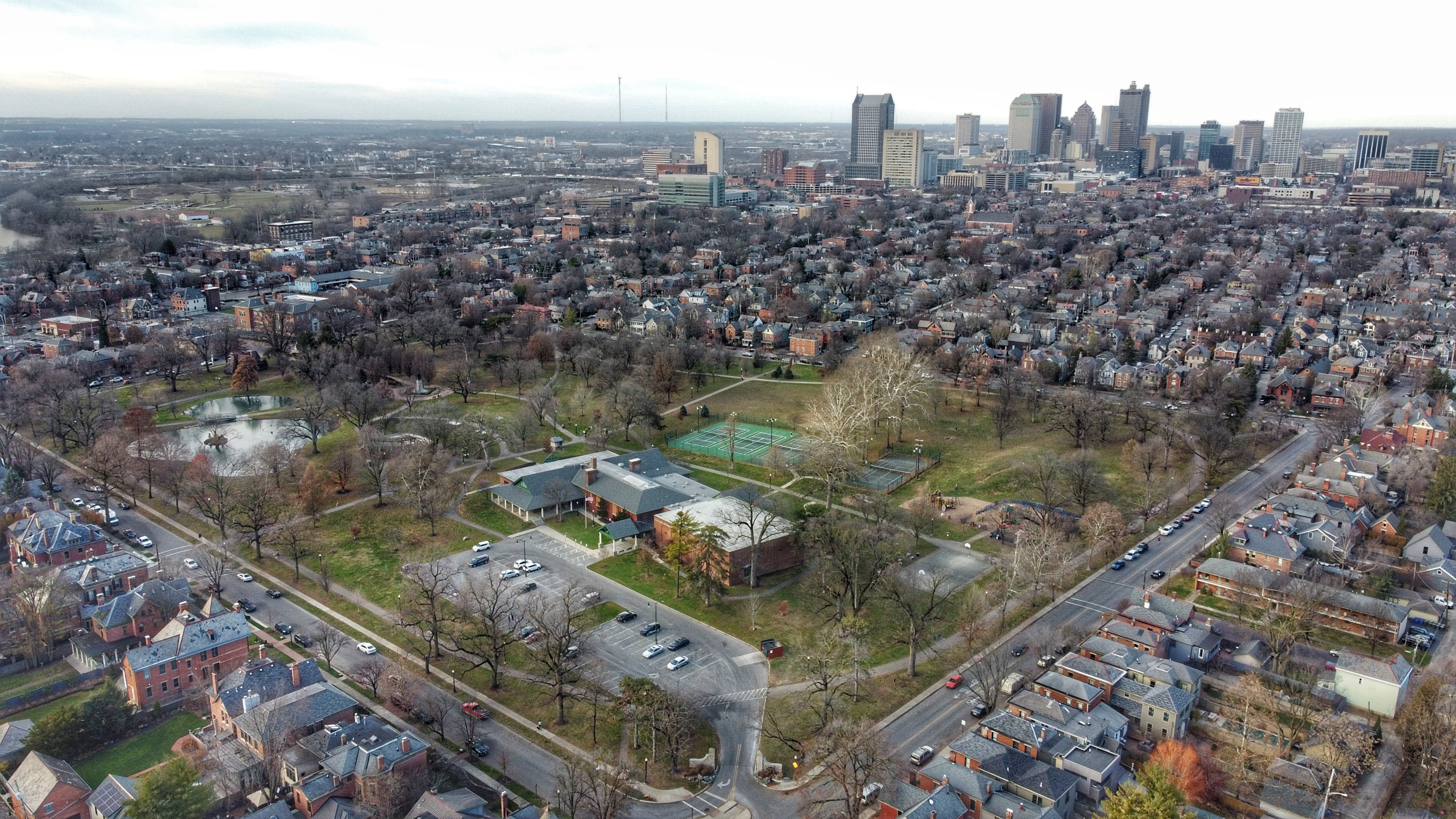
The park and its shelterhouse beside German Village and Downtown Columbus

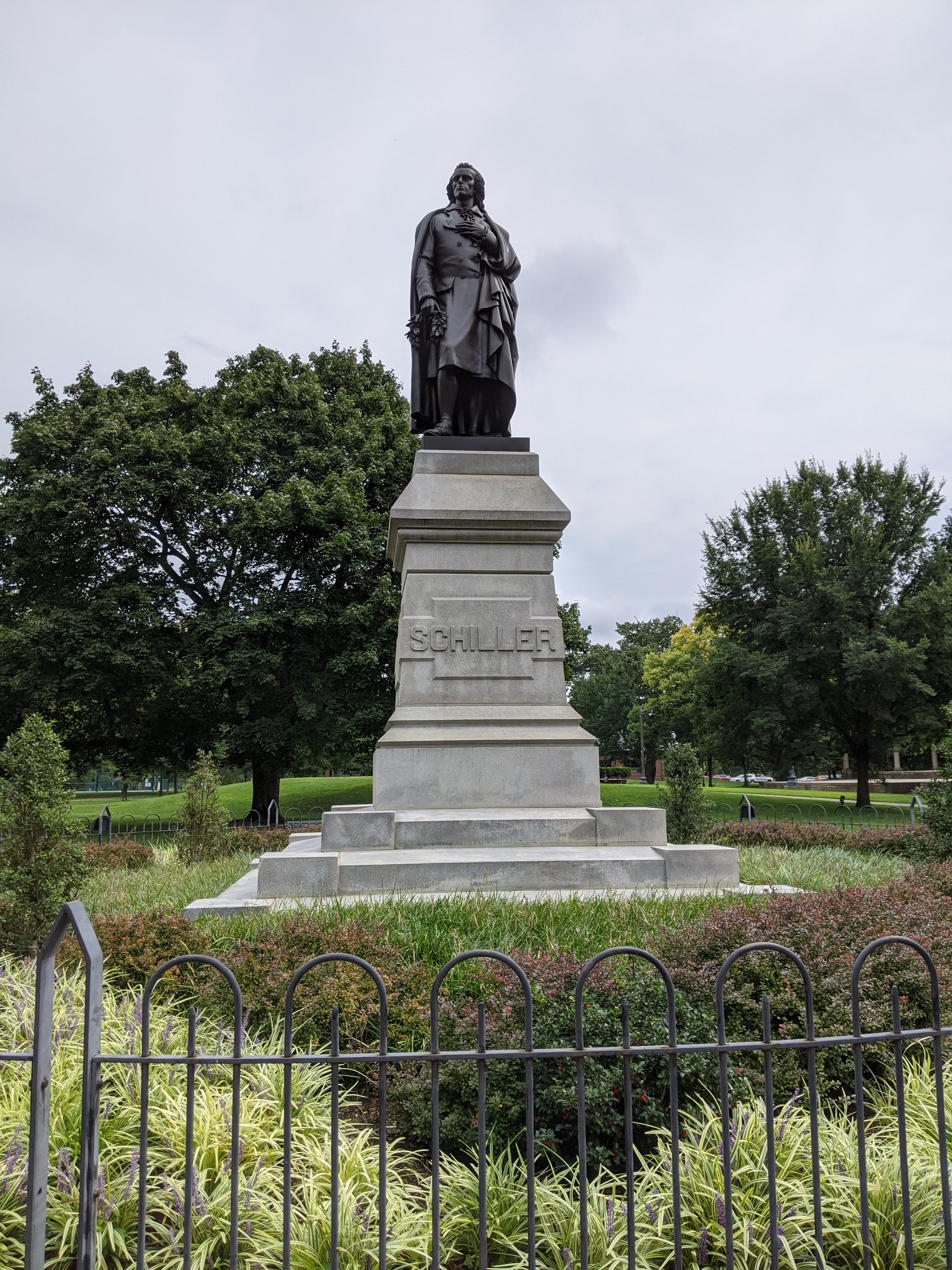
Statue of Friedrich Schiller

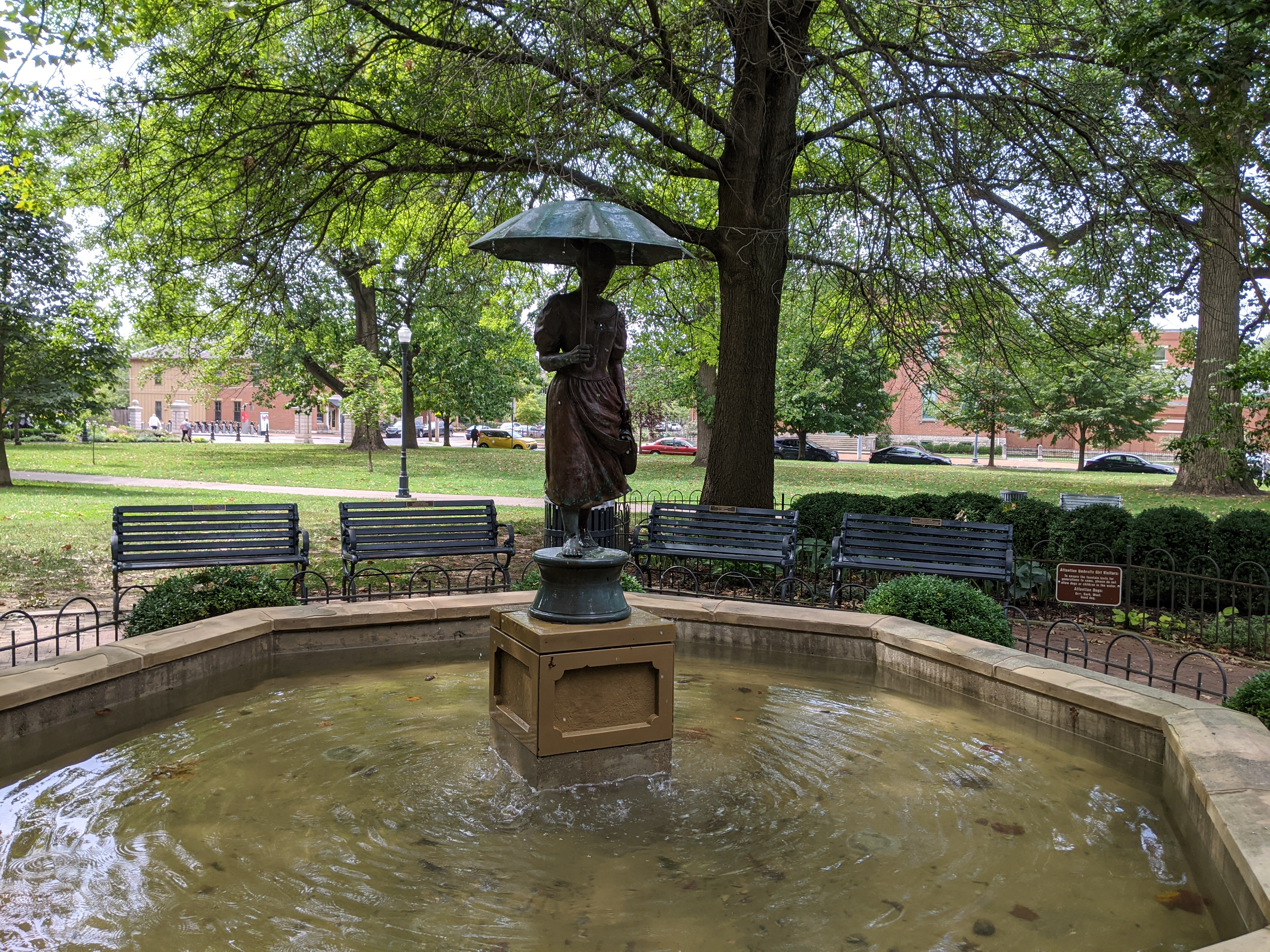
Umbrella Girl statue and fountain

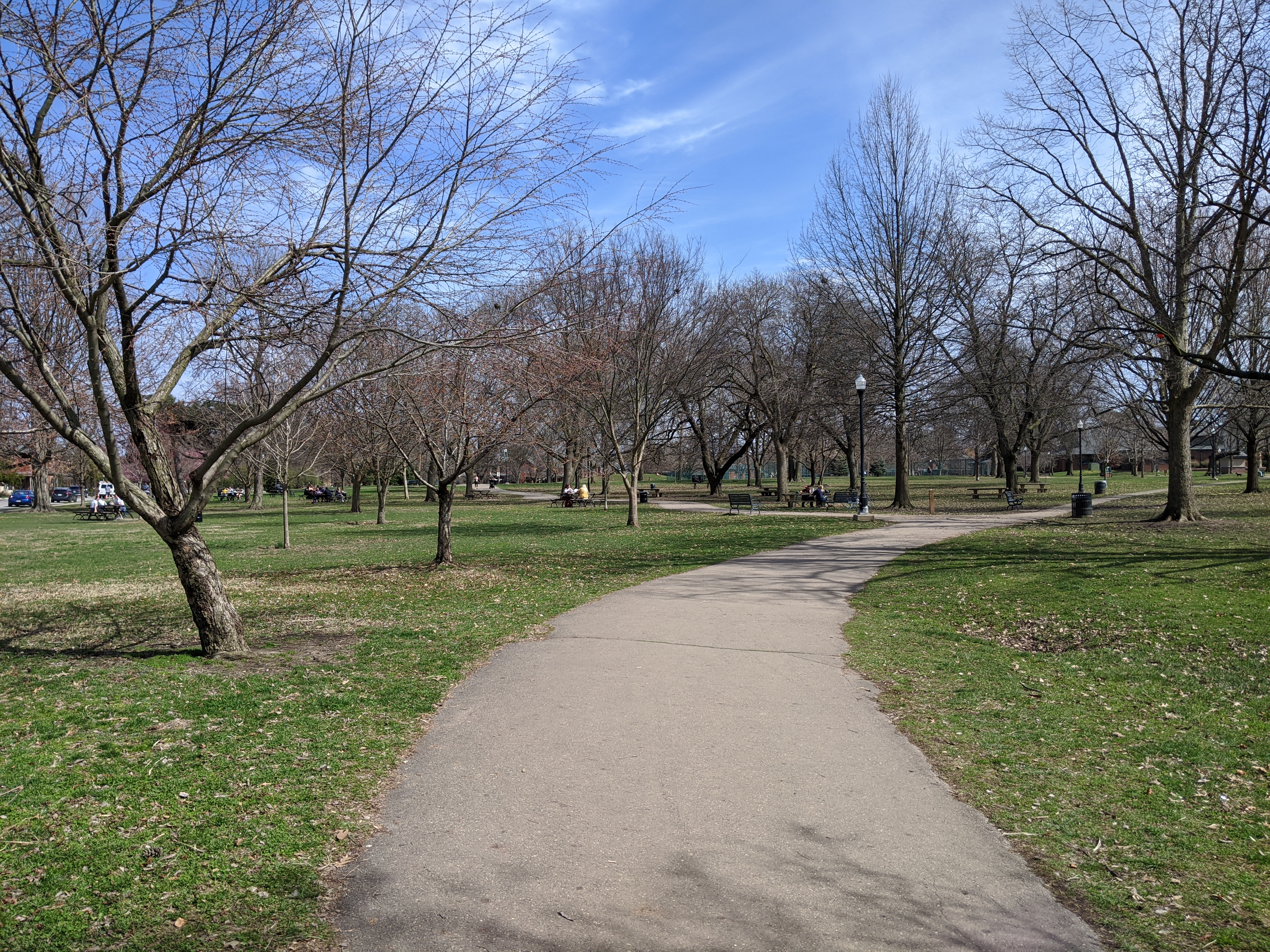
Winding pathway amid park space

== See also ==
- List of parks in Columbus, Ohio
