= Nightmares Film Festival =

Annual horror film festival in Columbus, Ohio, U.S.

- Festival Logo
- Location: Columbus, Ohio, USA
- Founded: 2016
- Most recent: 2024
- Directors: Jason Tostevin, Chris Hamel
- Festival date: Annually in October
- Language: English, International
- Website: nightmaresfest.com

Nightmares Film Festival is an international film festival for horror and genre films held annually in Columbus, Ohio, US. It premieres both feature and short films, and hosts celebrities, artists, filmmakers, screenwriters, industry reps and press from the horror genre.

It is frequently cited as one of the most influential genre film festivals in the US, and is recognized internationally, being named as one of MovieMaker Magazine's 50 Best Genre Festivals in the World in 2021 and 30 Bloody Best Genre Festivals in 2019, as well as one of Dread Central's Best Horror Festivals in the World in 2021.

== History ==
Nightmares Film Festival was founded in 2016 by indie filmmaker Jason Tostevin and Chris Hamel, the president of the Gateway Film Center. Prior to that, Tostevin had frequently collaborated with Hamel and recalls:

Chris Hamel's a film programmer and I'm a filmmaker with a lot of festival experience, and we're both just big fans. We have talked so many times about the movies we were seeing out there on the circuit, and how we wished there was one place that would gather them all together for the horror fans in Ohio. Finally, we decided to create that place, and Nightmares was formed.

The festival is held annually the weekend before Halloween at the Gateway Film Center and is a permanent fixture in the arts calendar of Columbus.

== Reception ==
Bloody Disgusting wrote that Nightmares Film Festivals is "immediately in the class of the best genre festivals anywhere", Dread Central said it's "a wonderful, welcoming home for fans of independent horror and genre cinema", and iHorror called it "the Cannes of horror".

As of March 2025, Nightmares Film Fest is one of the top three best reviewed festivals on FilmFreeway, with over 400 positive reviews from selected filmmakers.

== Awards ==
Nightmares Film Festival awards the following categories:

- The Film from Hell – best of the festival
- Best overall feature/short
- Best horror feature/short
- Best thriller feature/short
- Best midnight feature/short
- Best horror-comedy feature/short
- Best director feature/short
- Best cinematography feature/short
- Best writing feature/short
- Best lead performance feature/short
- Best supporting performance feature/short
- Best Recurring Nightmare
- Best screenplay feature/short

== See also ==
- List of fantastic and horror film festivals
