= Actors' Theatre of Columbus =

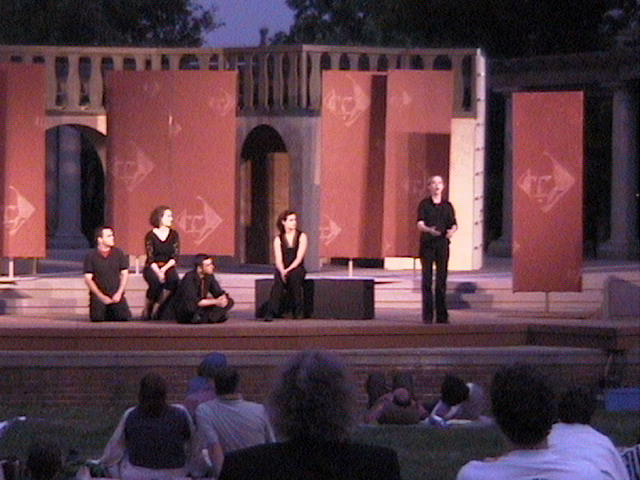
- Shakespeare at Schiller Park
- Founded: 1982
- Founder: Gary Ellson; Patricia Ellson
- Type: Theater troupe
- Location(s): 1000 City Park Avenue Columbus, Ohio, United States
- Coordinates: 39°56′30″N 82°59′34″W
- Website: theactorstheatre.org

Actors' Theatre of Columbus is a performing arts theater troupe founded in 1982 and located in Columbus, Ohio.

== History ==
In 1982 Actors' Theatre began with a single production of Shakespeare's "A Midsummer Night's Dream" (1590 and 1596). In 2011, the troupe celebrated its 30th annual season. Over the last 30 years, the troupe has increased its schedule from one production to two in their second season, and three productions each summer from their third season on. They briefly increased to four productions during the 2005–2007 seasons, but have returned to three productions since the 2008 season. As part of their "Cool Classics" series, they have also occasionally performed at indoor venues. Two recent Cool Classics are Tennessee Williams' "The Glass Menagerie" (1944) in 2010 and James Thurber's "The Male Animal" (1942) in 2011, both at the Columbus Performing Arts Center. By far the most frequently produced play is Shakespeare's "A Midsummer Night's Dream", which has had five productions to date.

The troupe first performed on the grass, and later on a simple wooden stage erected at the southern end of Schiller Park. The stage had to be erected and struck for each performance. Costumes and props were stored in the Ellson home nearby, which also served as dressing room and rehearsal space. This brick and concrete platform is completely open above, allowing the construction of multi-story sets that can remain intact throughout a production's run. The stage's scenic location within the park allows the audience to view the show from a gentle slope facing the stage. Audiences have a choice of bringing their own chairs, or using blankets. Food and drink are permitted during the shows.

Although they had moved on to other activities years before, during the 2006 season Gary and Patricia Ellson returned to co-write, produce and direct a unique musical adaptation of Shakespeare's "Twelfth Night". It would be the pair's final involvement with the troupe they had formed. Gary Ellson, already diagnosed with cancer during the shows run, succumbed to the disease in 2008.

Artistic Director John S. Kuhn served the company from 2003 until 2015. Mr. Kuhn brought Actors' Theatre productions to several venues in Columbus, as well as training a new generation of ATC artists. He was succeeded by Philip J. Hickman.

In 2016, Actors' Theatre expanded its summer season in Schiller Park to four productions. The 2017 season includes plays by William Shakespeare, Aphra Behn, and Jon Jory.
