= Max von Widnmann =

German sculptor and professor (1812–1895)

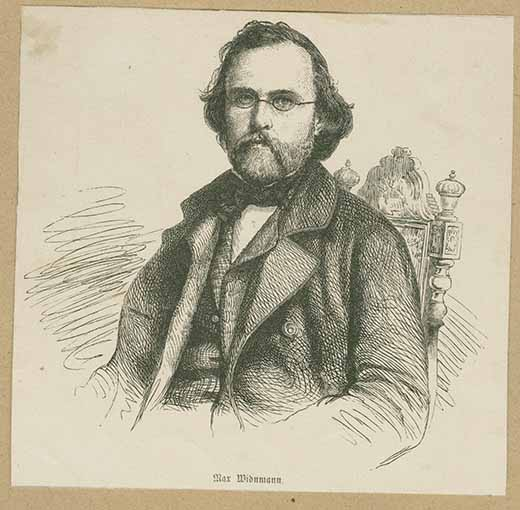
Max von Widnmann

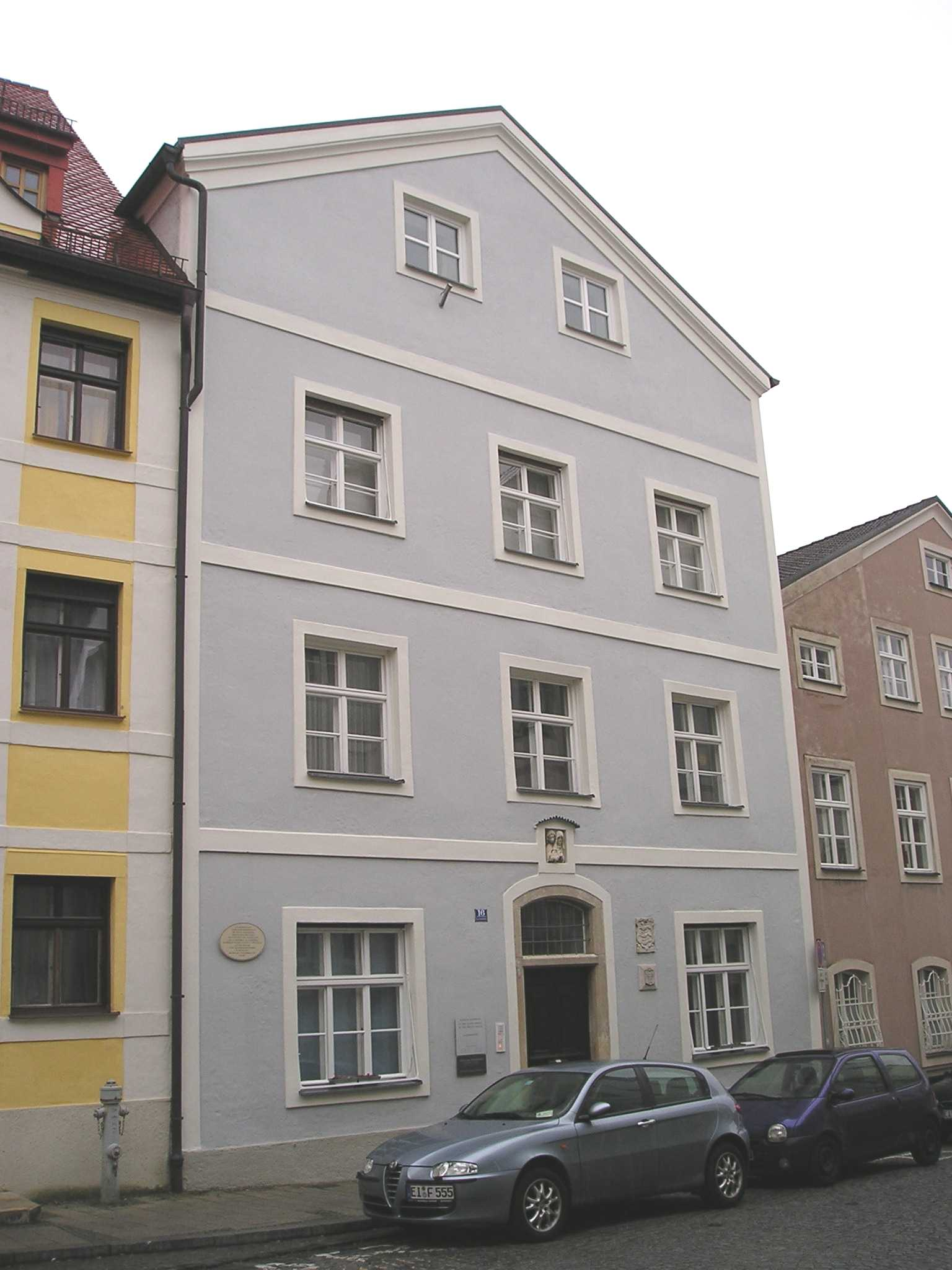
Birthplace of Max von Widnmann in Eichstätt

Max von Widnmann (ennobled as Maximilian Ritter von Widnmann; 16 October 1812 – 3 March 1895) was a German sculptor and professor at the Academy of Fine Arts in Munich. Many of his works were commissioned by King Ludwig I of Bavaria.

== Life and career ==
Max von Widnmann was born in Eichstätt, the youngest of three sons of Franz Amand Widnmann, who held the positions of court, town and regional physician, and his wife Maximiliana née Pöckhel, who also served as a town and local physician. After attending the gymnasium in Eichstätt, he entered the Academy of Fine Arts in Munich in 1825. There he studied with Ludwig Michael Schwanthaler among others. His teachers made it possible for him to go to Rome from 1836 to 1839, and there he befriended and studied with Bertel Thorvaldsen, who was already a well-known sculptor. He was also a friend of the Cologne architect Sulpiz Boisserée, whose art collection was acquired by Ludwig I for the Alte Pinakothek in 1827.

After returning from Rome, Widnmann became an independent artist in Munich, where Ludwig I soon began to commission works from him, including portrait busts for the Walhalla memorial near Regensburg. Ferdinand von Miller cast many of his sculptures in bronze.

In 1849, Widnmann became a professor at the Academy of Fine Arts, succeeding Schwanthaler. His increasing recognition brought him many commissions from outside Bavaria. In 1849 he was made a member of the Order of St. Michael. In 1887, the Prince Regent, Luitpold of Bavaria, personally ennobled him as a Knight of the Bavarian Crown.

He retired in 1887 and died in Munich at 82.

Widnmann's statues projected an air of dignity that appealed to his contemporaries and brought him many commissions; however, his smaller works, such as the busts, have been regarded as more artistically successful. Some of his work was destroyed in the bombing of Munich during World War II.

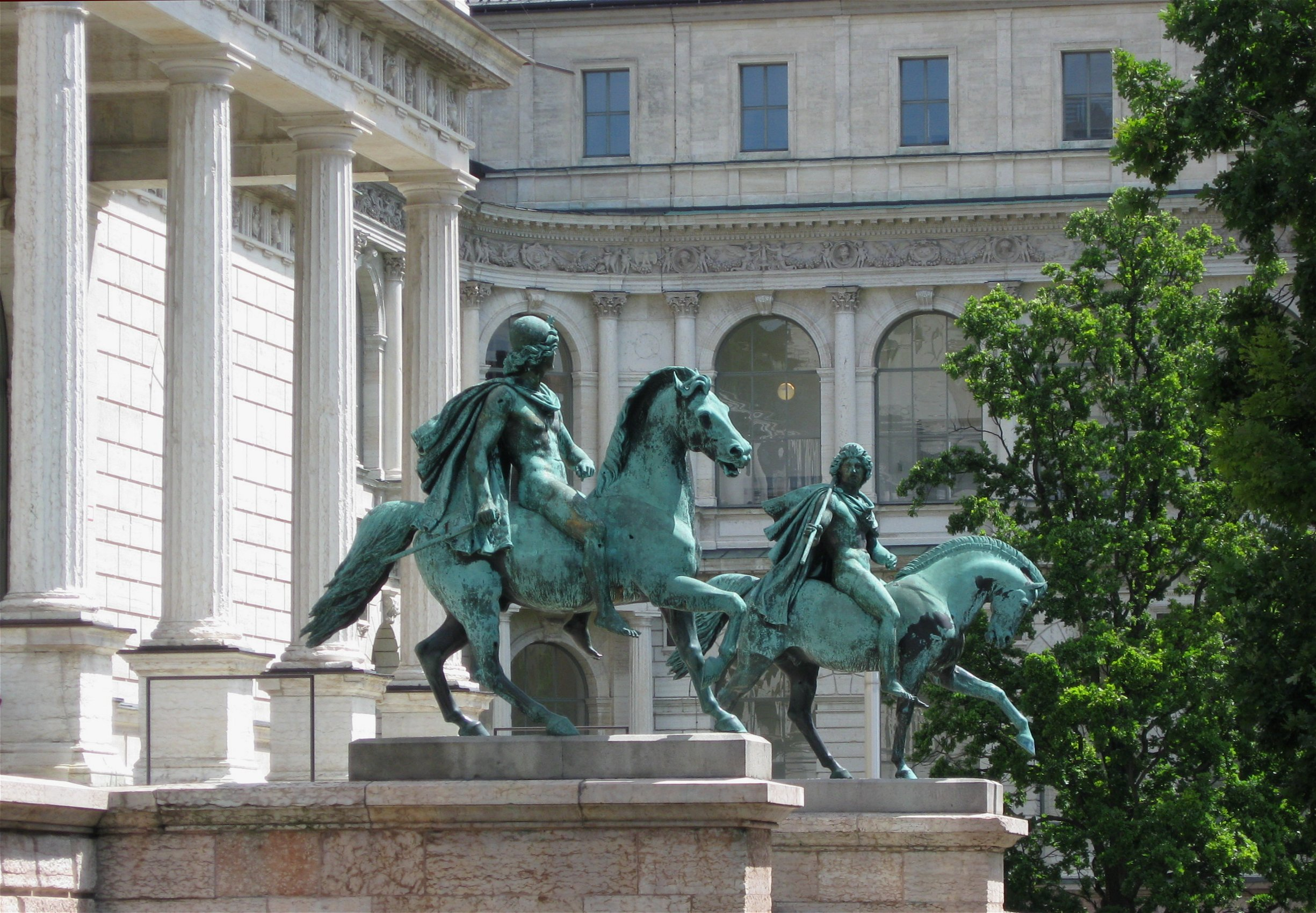
Castor and Pollux, at the Academy of Fine Arts, Munich (1886)

== Selected works ==
- Busts of Christian Amberger, Hans Holbein, Georg von Freundsberg, Mandl, Rottmann
- Leo von Klenze monument
- Friedrich von Gärtner monument
- Schiller and Goethe monuments in Munich
- Marble statue of Friedrich List (1847)
- Marble bust of General Carl Wilhelm von Heideck in Ingolstadt
- Monuments to bishops in Würzburg (bronze statue of Prince Bishop Julius Echter von Mespelbrunn, 1845), Bamberg (statue of Prince Bishop Franz Ludwig von Erthal, cast in bronze by Ferdinand von Miller, 1865) and Regensburg (statue of Bishop Johann Michael Sailer)
- Monuments to August Wilhelm Iffland and Wolfgang Heribert von Dalberg in Mannheim (1864/66, both cast by Miller)
- Memorial to Mathilde of Hesse in St. Ludwig's Church, Darmstadt
- Statues of Orlando di Lasso and Lorenz von Westenrieder on the Promenadeplatz in Munich (1848, 1854)
- Statue of Christian Daniel Rauch in the Glyptothek (1856)
- Monument to Christoph von Schmid in Dinkelsbühl (1859, cast by Miller)
- Bust of Jakob Bauer in the Isar meadows (Flaucher) (1861)
- Equestrian statue of Ludwig I in the Odeonsplatz (1862, designed by Schwanthaler)
- Equestrian statues of Castor and Pollux in front of the Academy of Fine Arts, Munich (1877)
Portrait statuary by Max von Widnmann

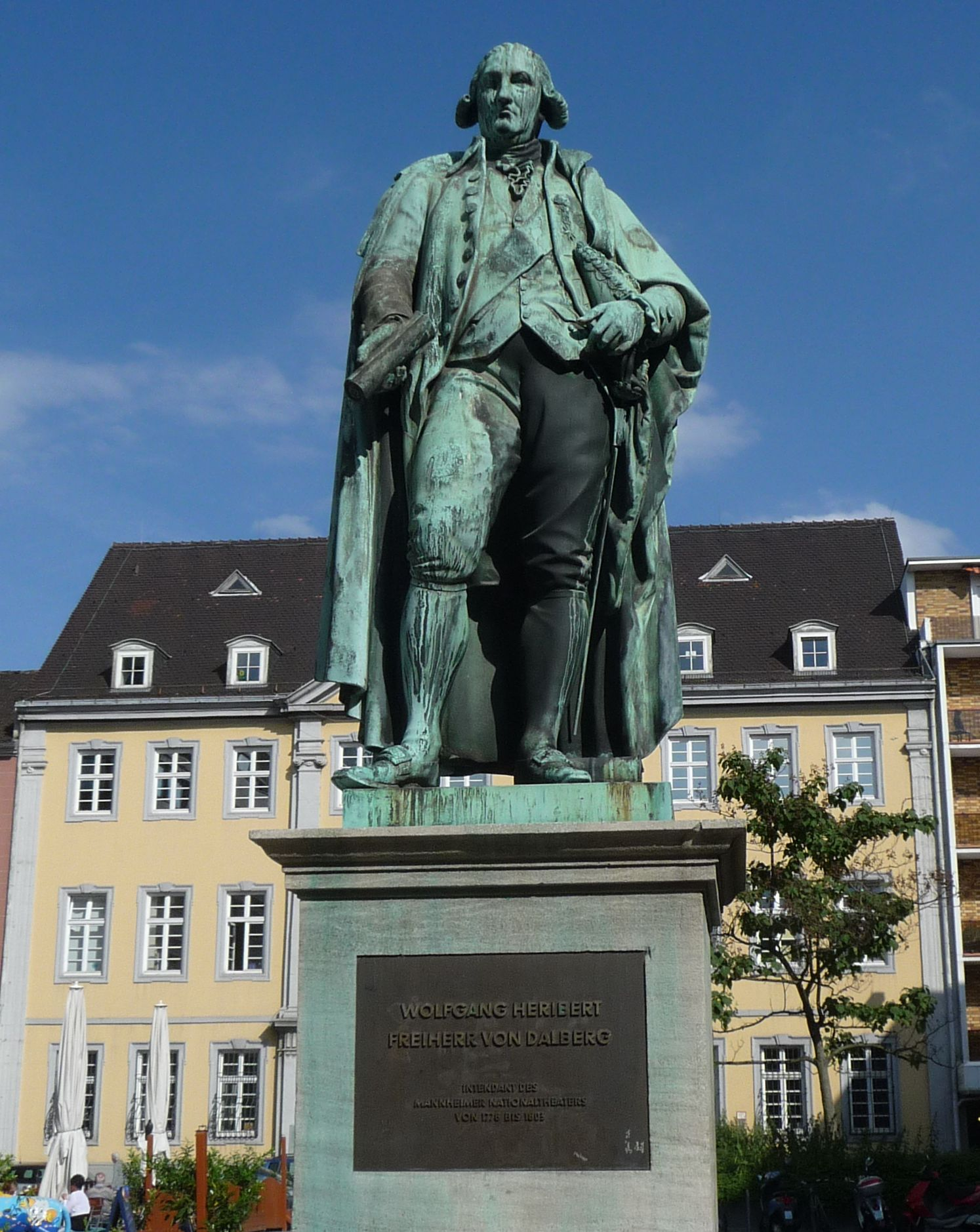
Monument to Wolfgang Heribert von Dalberg, Mannheim

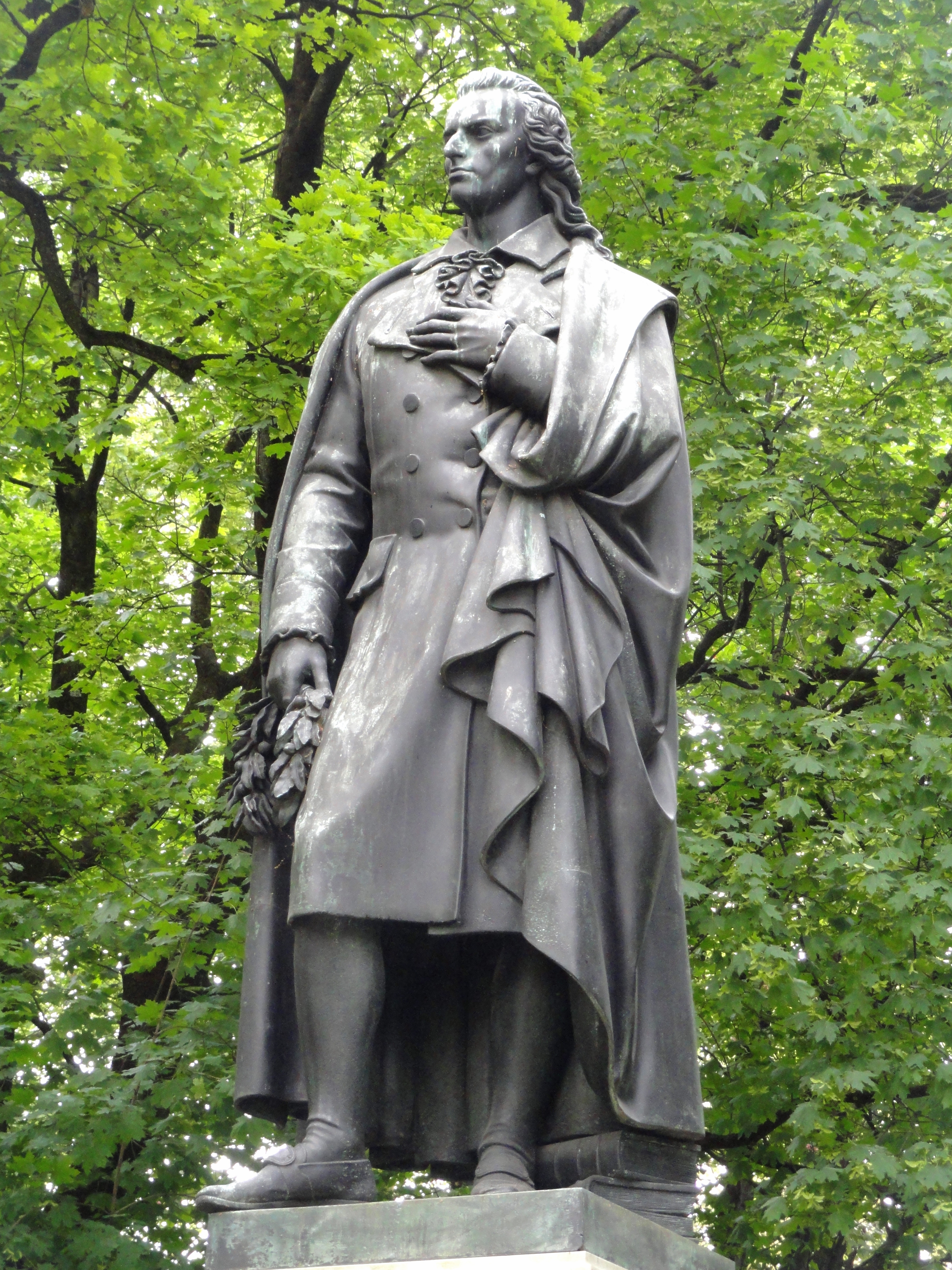
Schiller monument, Maximiliansplatz, Munich

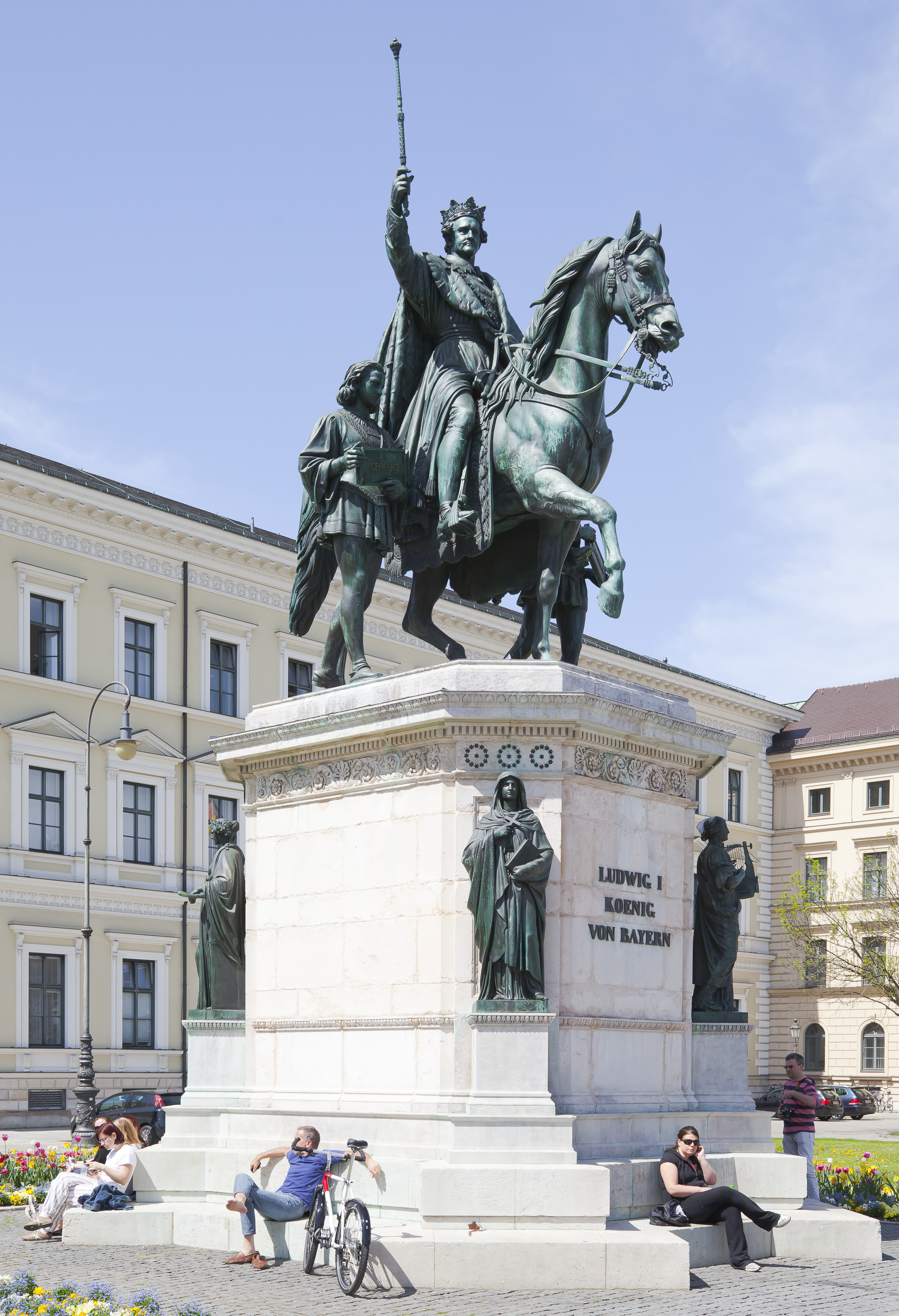
Equestrian statue of Ludwig I, Odeonsplatz, Munich (1862)

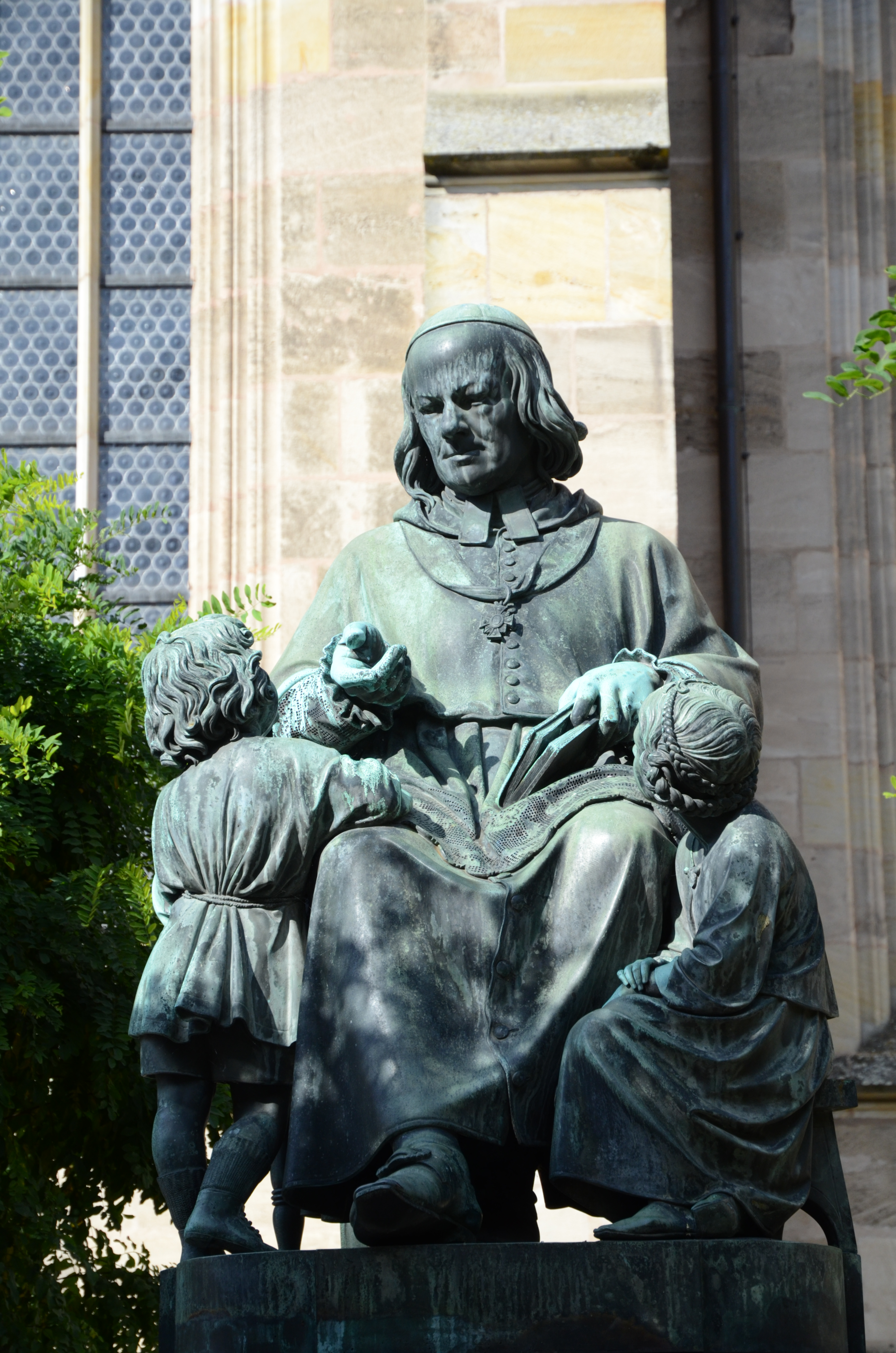
Monument to Christoph von Schmid, Dinkelsbühl (1859)

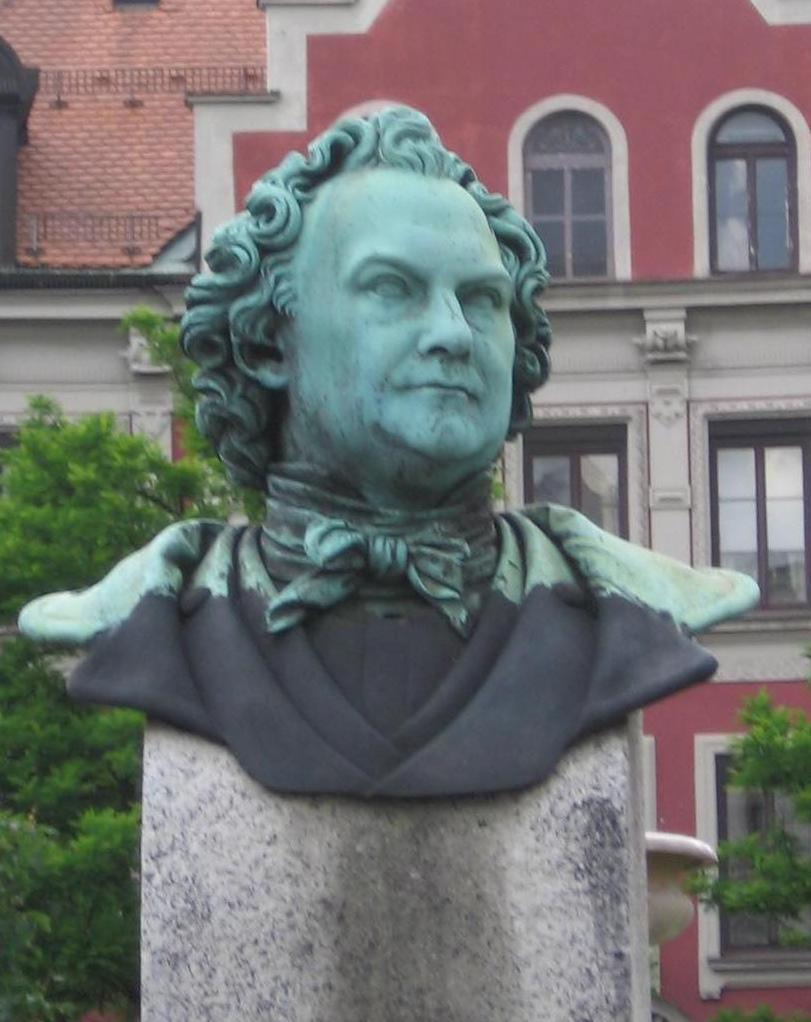
Bust of Friedrich von Gärtner, Gärtnerplatz, Munich
