= Robert Murray (artist) =

Canadian artist, born 1936

- Born: March 2, 1936 (age 90); Vancouver, British Columbia
- Education: Regina College School of Art (1956–1958); Allende Institute, San Miguel de Allende, Mexico (1958–1959)
- Known for: Abstract sculptor
- Movement: works within the Minimalist vernacular
- Spouse: Diana Lynn Armatage (married 1959)

Robert Gray Murray (born March 2, 1936) is considered by some to be Canada's foremost abstract sculptor. He also has been called the most important sculptor of his generation worldwide. His large outdoor works are said to resemble the abstract stabile style of Alexander Calder, that is, the self-supporting, static, abstract sculptures, dubbed "stabiles" by Jean Arp in 1932 to differentiate them from Calder's mobiles. Murray has stated that he focused on "trying to get sculpture back to its essential form". His work is like colour-field abstraction.

== Biography ==
Born in Vancouver, British Columbia, and raised in Saskatoon, Saskatchewan, he has lived in the United States since 1960. He began his career as a painter, studying at the Regina College School of Art (1956–1958). In 1957 he worked at the city planning office in Saskatoon and it commissioned a fountain sculpture from him: it was his first sculpture. He went to study at the Allende Institute, San Miguel de Allende, Mexico (1958–1959), then worked at Saskatoon Technical Collegiate before attending an Emma Lake Artist's Workshop in 1959 with Barnett Newman with whom he formed a lifelong friendship. Newman looked at his paintings and asked "Have you ever thought of sculpture?" He moved to New York City in 1960 on a Canada Council grant, and although he had never studied sculpture in the formal sense, began to produce modernist, elegant, brightly colored welded-metal constructions.

Murray's works often recall natural themes through shape, color, and of course, name; other works are named after people, places, or things in North America though of course, as Murray said:

"With abstract art the piece is itself and what happens within the piece is the subject of the piece".

Murray's earliest sheet-metal sculptures were large-scale upright columnar configurations that were made by cutting and bending steel plates to form angles and corners. They were coloured with industrial finishes and created with the aid of fabricators. In 1974, Murray's sculptures became more freely formed than before, with more crenellated surfaces. Murray had a new concern with highly fluid curves that combined complexity of form with subtler colour. His ambition was to incorporate colour as a part of the metal.

Murray usually works to an architectural scale in his sculptures; they have no content but form. They can be viewed as belonging to a past aesthetic – Modernism – and lacking in contemporary relevance. But a reviewer of a recent show, Models, Paintings and Sculpture, much of it completed in the last three years, at Studio 21 Fine Art, Halifax, wrote that, when well executed, a Modernist like Murray can still make objects that achieve a "clarity and sureness that is somehow comforting".

== Work in collections ==
=== United States ===
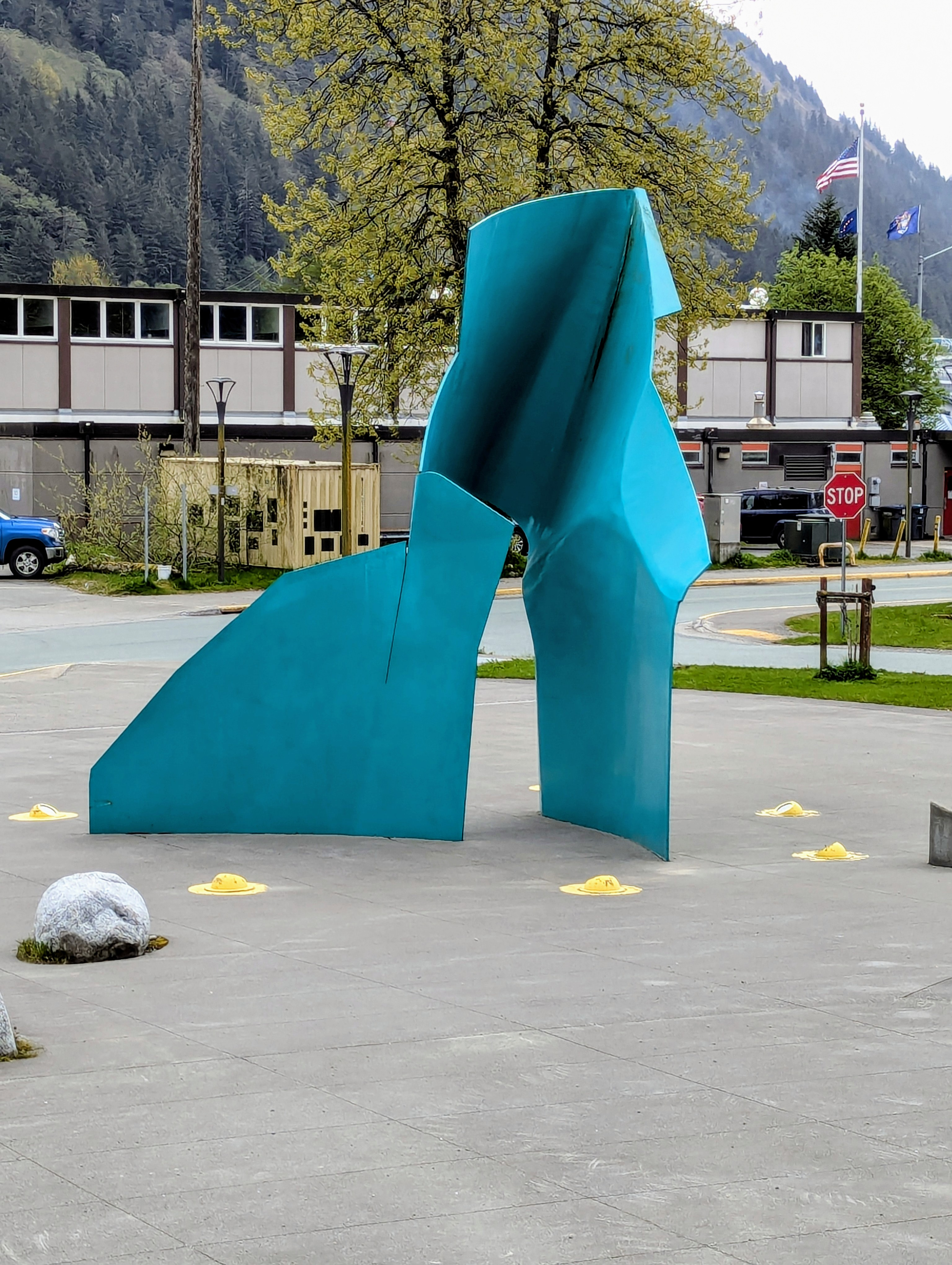
Nimbus sculpture, situated outside the Alaska State Museum in Juneau, AK

Alaska

- Nimbus, 1978, Alaska State Museum, Juneau

California

- Chinook, 1968, Berkeley Art Museum, University of California, Berkeley
- "Duet (Homage to David Smith)". artslb.org. California State University, Long Beach.

Delaware

- Sioux, 1984, Delaware Art Museum, Wilmington

District of Columbia

- Marker, 1964–65, Hirshhorn Museum and Sculpture Garden, Washington

Georgia

- Montauk, 1967, Adams Park Library, Atlanta,

Illinois

- Windhover, 1970, Hinsdale Junior High School, Hinsdale

Maine

- Pointe-au-baril III, 1995, collection of Cynthia Stroud, Brooklin

Massachusetts

- Quinnipiac, 1974, University Gallery, University of Massachusetts, Amherst
- Drawing after Quinnipiac, Seven Views, 1975, University Gallery, University of Massachusetts, Amherst

Michigan

- Nordkyn, 1973–74, Ferry Mall, Wayne State University, Detroit
- Windhover, 1976, Grand Rapids Art Museum, Grand Rapids

Minnesota

- Taku, 1976, Honeywell Plaza, Minneapolis
- Track, 1965, Walker Art Center, Minneapolis

Nebraska

- Nanticoke, 1980, Sheldon Memorial Art Gallery and Sculpture Garden, Lincoln

New Jersey

- Hillary, 1983, Grounds for Sculpture, Hamilton
- Agulapak, 1974, New Jersey State Museum, Trenton

New York

- Chilkat, 1977, Metropolitan Museum, New York
- Megan's Red, SUNY, Fredonia
- Kiana, 1978, Storm King, Mountainville
- Spinnaker, 1979, JPMorgan Chase Art Collection, New York
- Siwash, Vassar Art Gallery, Vassar College, Poukeepsie
- Shawanagan, 1968, Everson Museum of Art, Syracuse, New York
- Spring, 1965, Whitney Museum of American Art, New York

Ohio

- Wasahaban/Claire, 1978, Columbus Museum of Art, Columbus

Pennsylvania

- Saginaw, 1979, collection of the artist, West Grove, Pennsylvania
- Mandan, 1985, collection of the artist, West Grove, Pennsylvania
- Palestina, 1985, collection of the artist, West Grove, Pennsylvania
- Pattern, 1993–1996, collection of the artist, West Grove, Pennsylvania
- Pointe-au-baril II, 1995, collection of the artist, West Grove, Pennsylvania
- Bethany, 1981, collection of W. Dixon Stroud, West Grove, Pennsylvania
- Lillooet, 1985, collection of W. B. Dixon Stroud, West Grove, Pennsylvania

Wisconsin

- Windfall, 1966, Lynden Sculpture Garden, Milwaukee

=== Canada ===
Alberta

- Dyad, 1967, University of Alberta, Edmonton

British Columbia

- Skagway, 1977, Kelowna Art Gallery, Kelowna
- Cumbria, 1966, University of British Columbia, Vancouver
- La Guardia, 1968, Vancouver Art Gallery, Vancouver
- Ceres, 1962, J. A. and Mary Pyrch Collection, Victoria
- Juneau, 1977, Art Gallery of Greater Victoria, Victoria
- Kennebec, 1978, Art Gallery of Greater Victoria, Victoria
- Oneida, 1978, Art Gallery of Greater Victoria, Victoria
- Hillary, 1983, serigraph, Art Gallery of Greater Victoria, Victoria
- Lennon Yellow, 1980, Art Gallery of Greater Victoria, Victoria

Ontario

- TO, 1963, Art Gallery of Ontario, Toronto
- Swing, 1974, Art Gallery of Ontario, Toronto
- Ferus, 2001, Pointe au Baril
- Kawaatebiishing, 2003, Pointe au Baril
- Pointe au Baril II, 2003, Pointe au Baril
- Gap, 1973, Canada Council Art Bank, Ottawa
- Huron, 1974, Canada Council Art Bank, Ottawa
- Juneau, 1976, Canada Council Art Bank, Ottawa
- Prairie, 1965–66, Canada Council Art Bank, Ottawa
- Roll, 1973, Canada Council Art Bank, Ottawa
- Sitka, 1976, Canada Council Art Bank, Ottawa
- Split, 1973, Canada Council Art Bank, Ottawa
- Togiak, 1974, Canada Council Art Bank, Ottawa
- Tundra (for Barnett Newman), 1972–73, Carleton University, Ottawa
- Haida, 1973, Dept. of External Affairs, Ottawa
- Adam and Eve, 1962–63, National Gallery of Canada, Ottawa
- Arroyo, 1968, National Gallery of Canada, Ottawa
- Breaker, 1965, National Gallery of Canada, Ottawa
- Burwash, 1970, ed. of 17, National Gallery of Canada, Ottawa
- Caldwell, 1973, lithograph, National Gallery of Canada, Ottawa
- Chilcotin, 1969, National Gallery of Canada, Ottawa
- Untitled, 1969, National Gallery of Canada, Ottawa
- Working Model for "Fountain Sculpture" 1959, National Gallery of Canada, Ottawa and Drawing for Fountain Sculpture, National Gallery of Canada, Ottawa
- Trent Series I-10, 1981, National Gallery of Canada, Ottawa
- Lillooet, 2007, Snug Harbor
- Mbishkaad]/To Ascend, 2004, One King West, Toronto
- Becca's H, 1973, University of Toronto, Toronto
- Cascade, 1983, University College art collection, University of Toronto, Toronto
- Charybdis, 1962, Paul and Dinah Arthur, Toronto
- Ferus, 1963, Paul and Dinah Arthur, Toronto
- Lazarus 1961-2, Estate of Marie Fleming, Toronto
- Mesa (1967) Mr. and Mrs. David Mirvish, Toronto
- Arthabaska, 1966–67, Gallery Stratford, Stratford, Ontario

New Brunswick

- Nunc Dimittis, New Brunswick Museum, St. John

Saskatchewan

- Rainmaker, 1959–60, Saskatoon City Hall, Saskatoon
- Study for Saskatoon, 1976, Mendel Art Gallery, Saskatoon

=== Not located ===
- Chief (1964)
- Bank (1968)
- Teal (1969)
- Garnet (1974)
- Magnetawan (1974)
- Tikchik (1974)
- Kodiak (1975)
- Seward (1976)
- Willow (1976)
- Alagash, 1978
- Chesapeake (1980)
- Spinnaker (1980)
- Susquehana (1980)
- Pointe au Baril IX (2003)
- No Exit (2004)
- Ferus (model B) (2008)
