= Wasahaban =

Sculpture in Columbus, Ohio, U.S.

- The sculpture in 2018
- Artist: Robert Murray
- Year: 1978
- Medium: Aluminum sculpture
- Dimensions: 2.3 m × 1.8 m (7.5 ft × 6 ft)
- Location: Columbus, Ohio, United States
- Coordinates: 39°57′50.15″N 82°59′18.15″W

Wasahaban is a 1978 painted aluminum sculpture by Robert Murray, installed outside the Columbus Museum of Art in Columbus, Ohio, United States. The abstract artwork, painted blue-green, is 7 ft., 6 in. tall and 6 ft. wide. It was fabricated by Lippincott, Inc., and acquired by the museum in 1979 with funds provided by the Hattie W. and Robert Lazarus Fund of The Columbus Foundation, as well as the National Endowment for the Arts.

== See also ==
- 1978 in art
