= Columbus Museum of Art =

Museum in Columbus, Ohio, United States

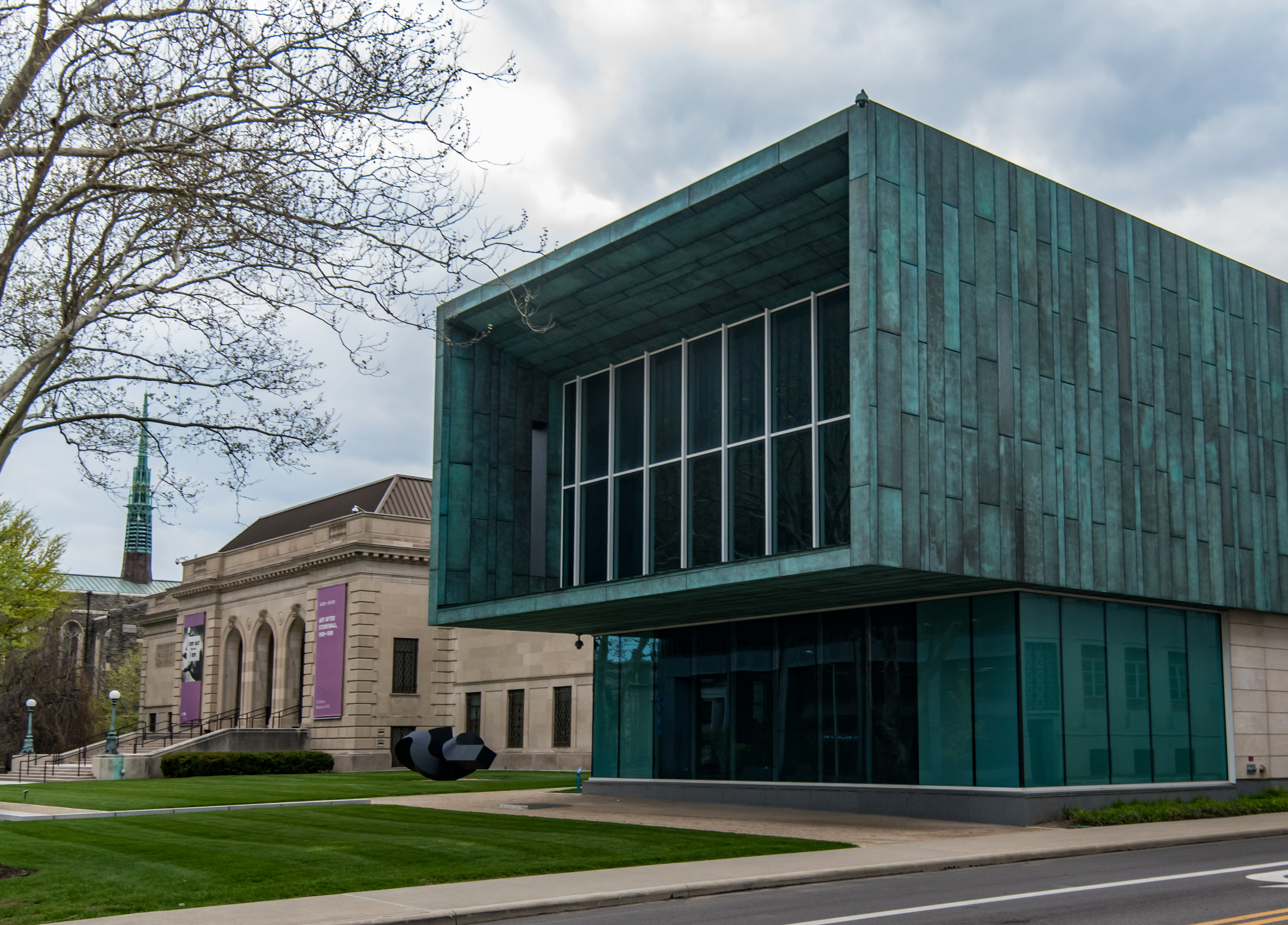
- Former name: Columbus Gallery of Fine Arts
- Established: 1878
- Location: 480 E. Broad St., Columbus, Ohio 43215; United States
- Type: Art museum
- Executive director: Brooke A. Minto
- Public transit access: 10; CoGo
- Interactive map
- Interactive map highlighting the CMA's locations
- 39°57′52″N 82°59′16″W

History
- Built: 1931

Site notes
- Area: Under 1 acre (0.40 ha)
- Architect(s): Richards, McCarty and Bulford; Robert Aitken
- Architectural style: Second Renaissance Revival
- Visitors: 254,092 (in 2022)
- Website: columbusmuseum.org

U.S. National Register of Historic Places
- Designated: March 19, 1992
- Reference no.: 92000173

The Columbus Museum of Art (CMA) is an art museum in downtown Columbus, Ohio. Formed in 1878 as the Columbus Gallery of Fine Arts (its name until 1978), it was the first art museum to register its charter with the state of Ohio. The museum collects and exhibits American and European modern and contemporary art, folk art, glass art, and photography. The museum has been led by Executive Director Brooke Minto since 2023.

== History ==
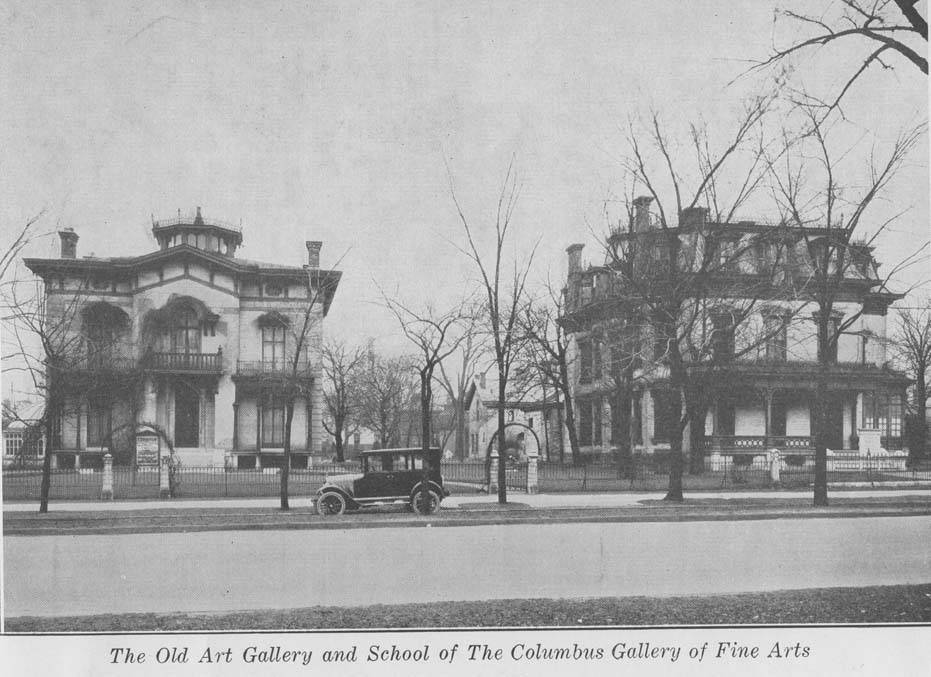
The Sessions house and William Monypeny houses, hosting the art museum (left) and Columbus Art School (right)

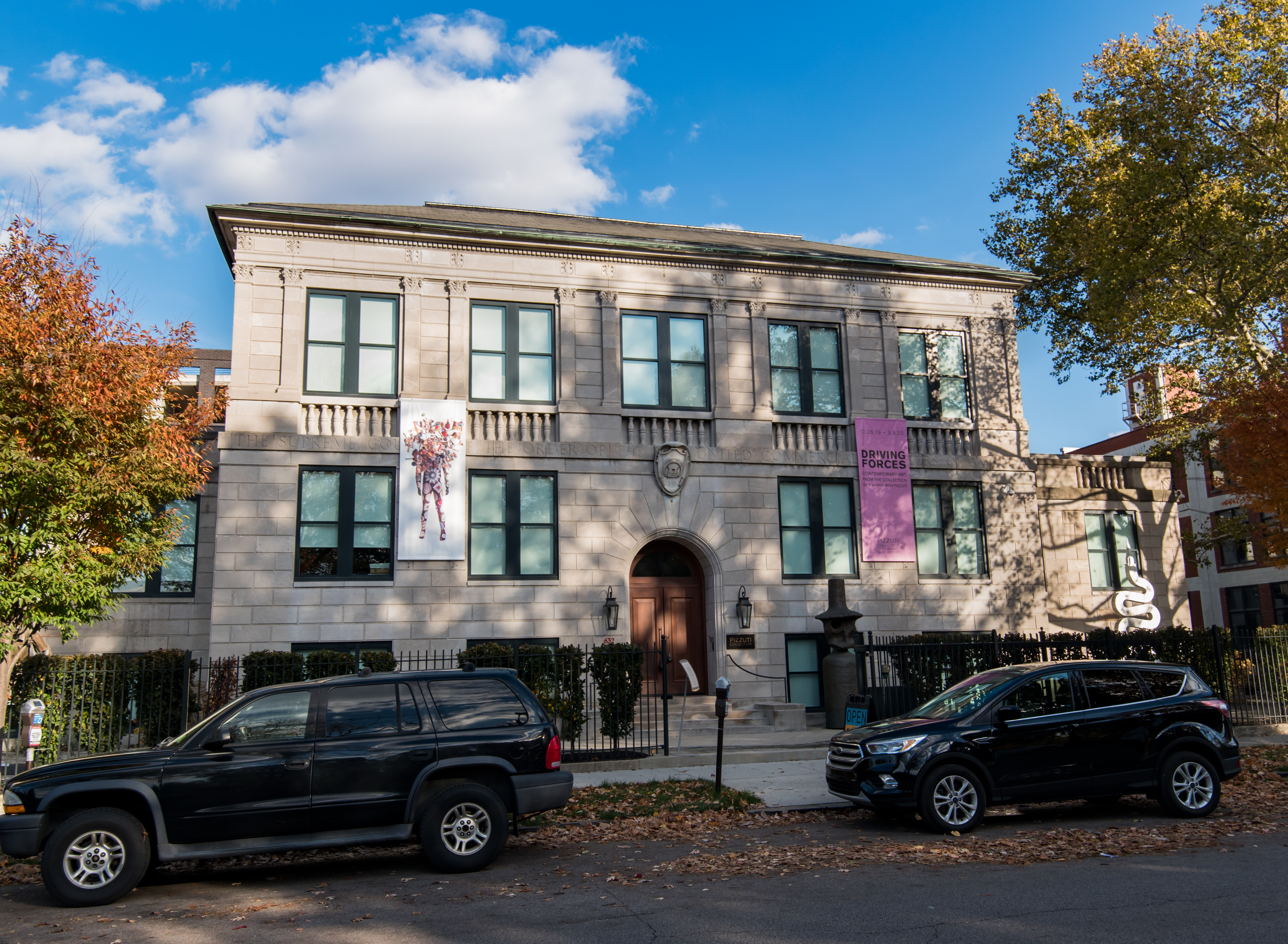
The Pizzuti Collection

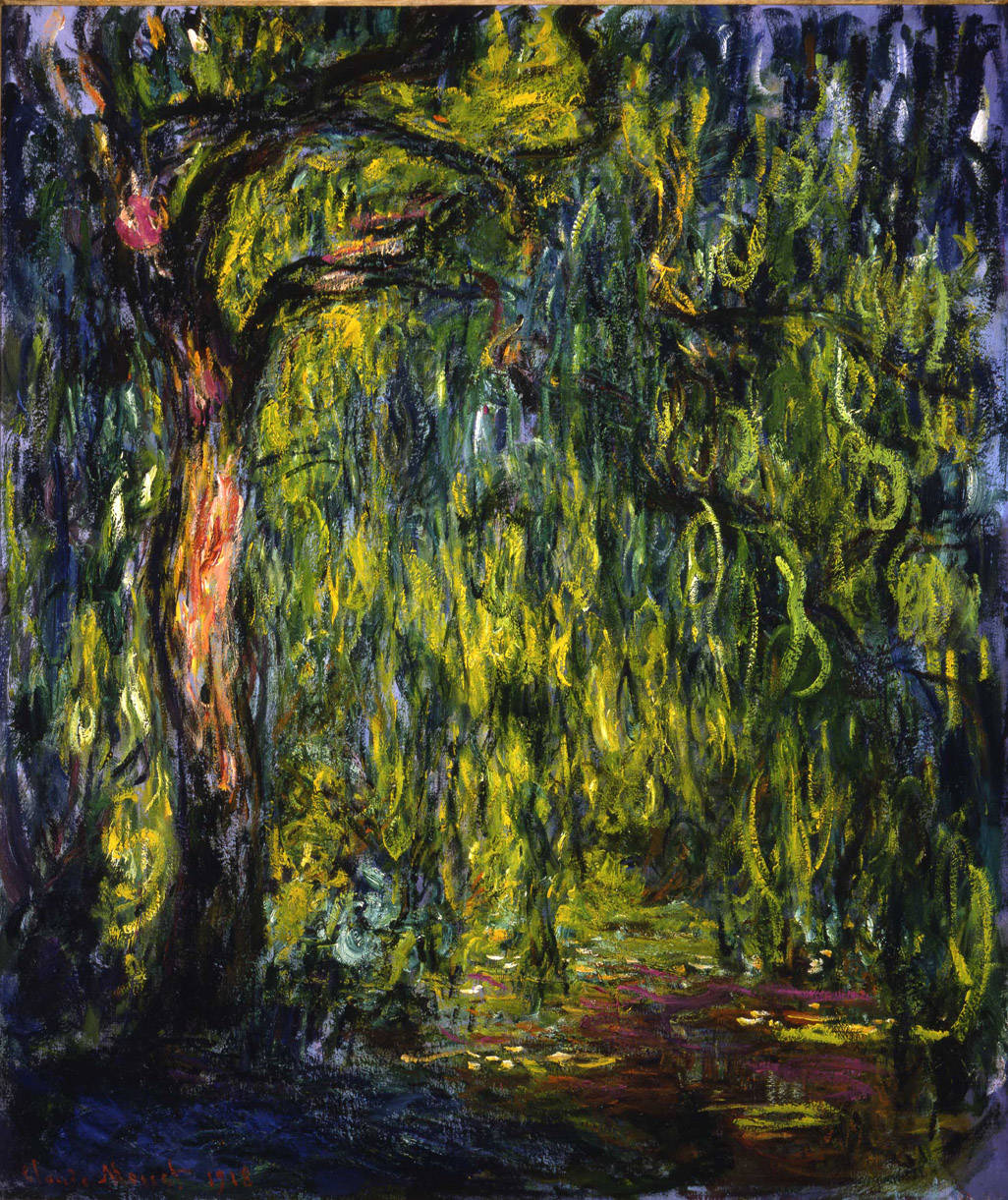
Claude Monet, Weeping Willow, 1918

The CMA was founded in 1878 as the Columbus Gallery of Fine Arts. Beginning in 1919, it was housed in the Francis C. Sessions house, a founder of Columbus Art School (later known as Columbus College of Art and Design (CCAD). Sessions deeded the mansion and property to the art museum, which operated there until 1923. The house was demolished, with the current museum built on its site. The museum's Beaton Hall (administrative offices) includes elements from the entranceway of the Sessions house.

The current building was built on the same site from 1929 to 1931, opening on January 22, 1931. In 1974, a visually unobtrusive structure was added to the rear of the building. The museum building was added to the National Register of Historic Places on March 19, 1992, under its original name.

The Columbus Museum of Art began a massive reconstruction and expansion in 2007. The first new space opened on January 1, 2011, after 13 months of construction. The space, called the Center for Creativity, is an 18,000 sq ft (1,700 m^{2}) space that includes galleries, gathering areas, and places for workshops that allow visitors to engage in hands-on activities. On October 25, 2015, the new Margaret M. Walter wing opened to the public, adding 50,000 square feet of addition and 40,000 square feet of major renovation to the Museum. The Margaret M. Walter Wing was designed by Michael Bongiorno of the Columbus-based architecture firm DesignGroup. The museum concurrently revealed a new brand identity led by the Columbus, Ohio-based branding agency Blackletter.

In September 2018, the Pizzuti Collection, a museum in the Short North, was donated to the CMA, along with part of its collection. The museum opened as a part of the Columbus Museum of Art that year. The museum and its Pizzuti Collection branch temporarily closed beginning in March 2020 due to the COVID-19 pandemic.

The Columbus Museum of Art is part of the Monuments Men and Women Museum Network, launched in 2021 by the Monuments Men Foundation for the Preservation of Art.

== Ross Building layout and architecture ==
The 1931 museum building, today known as the Elizabeth M. and Richard M. Ross Building, was designed in the Second Renaissance Revival style by Columbus architects Richards, McCarty and Bulford. It has a concrete foundation, walls of limestone and concrete, and a truncated copper hipped roof. The building is horizontal, two stories high, and has a central structure advanced several feet in front of its two wings. The wings feature large limestone friezes, together known as The Frederick W. Schumacher Frieze or Masters of Art. The work, by Robert Ingersoll Aitken and named after Frederick W. Schumacher, depicts 68 artists from 490 B.C. to 1925 A.D.

The original main entryway consists of three arched portals to the interior. The facade here includes decorative moldings, keystones, bulls-eye medallions, and stone quoins. A frieze hung above the arches, with the name "Columbus Gallery of Fine Arts". A set of sixteen limestone steps leads to the sidewalk, flanked by two Italian-style lamp posts.

The Center for Creativity, on the first floor of the museum, includes a Creativity Lounge, The Studio, The Wonder Room, the Big Idea Gallery, and an Open Gallery.

=== Gallery ===
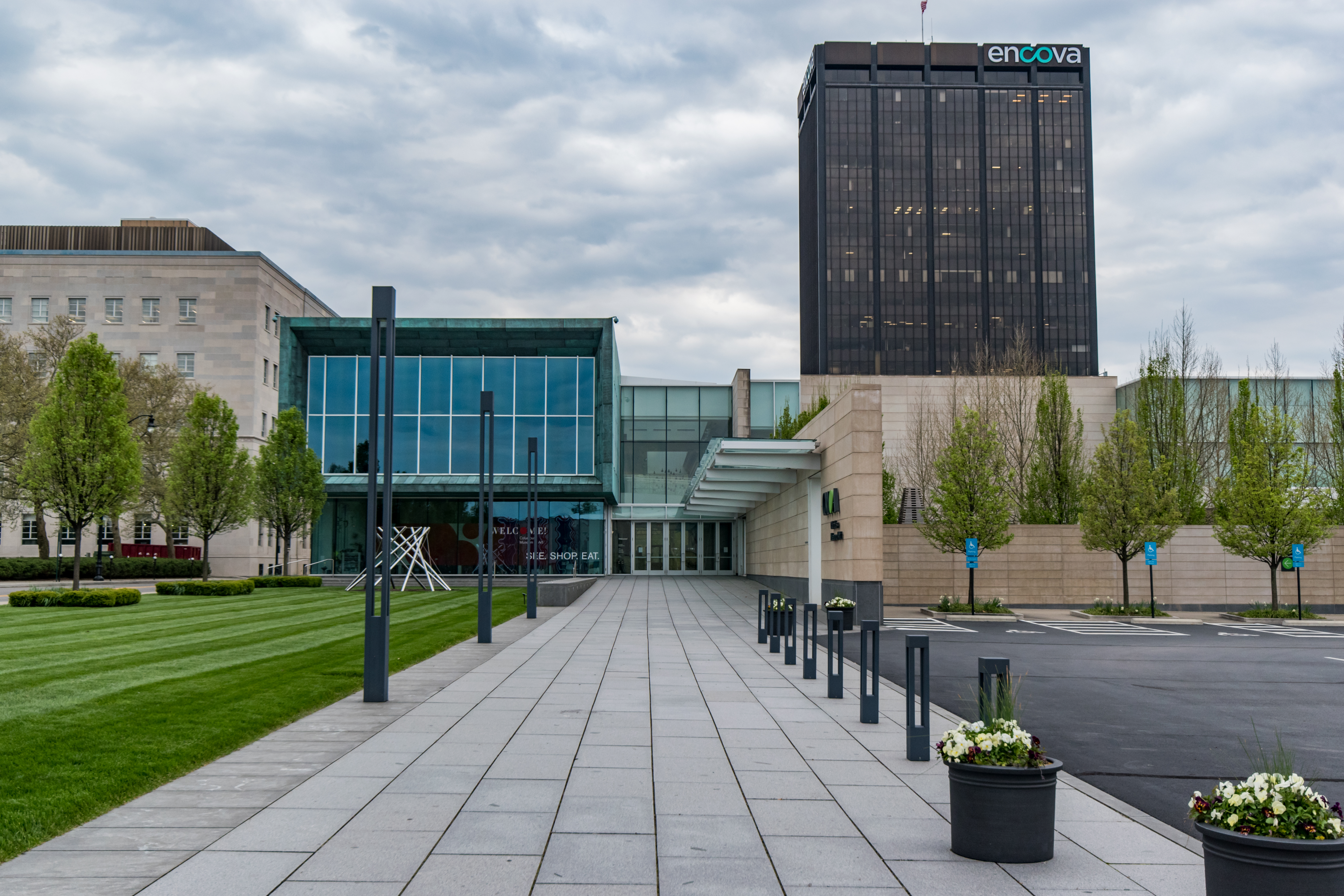
Current museum entrance

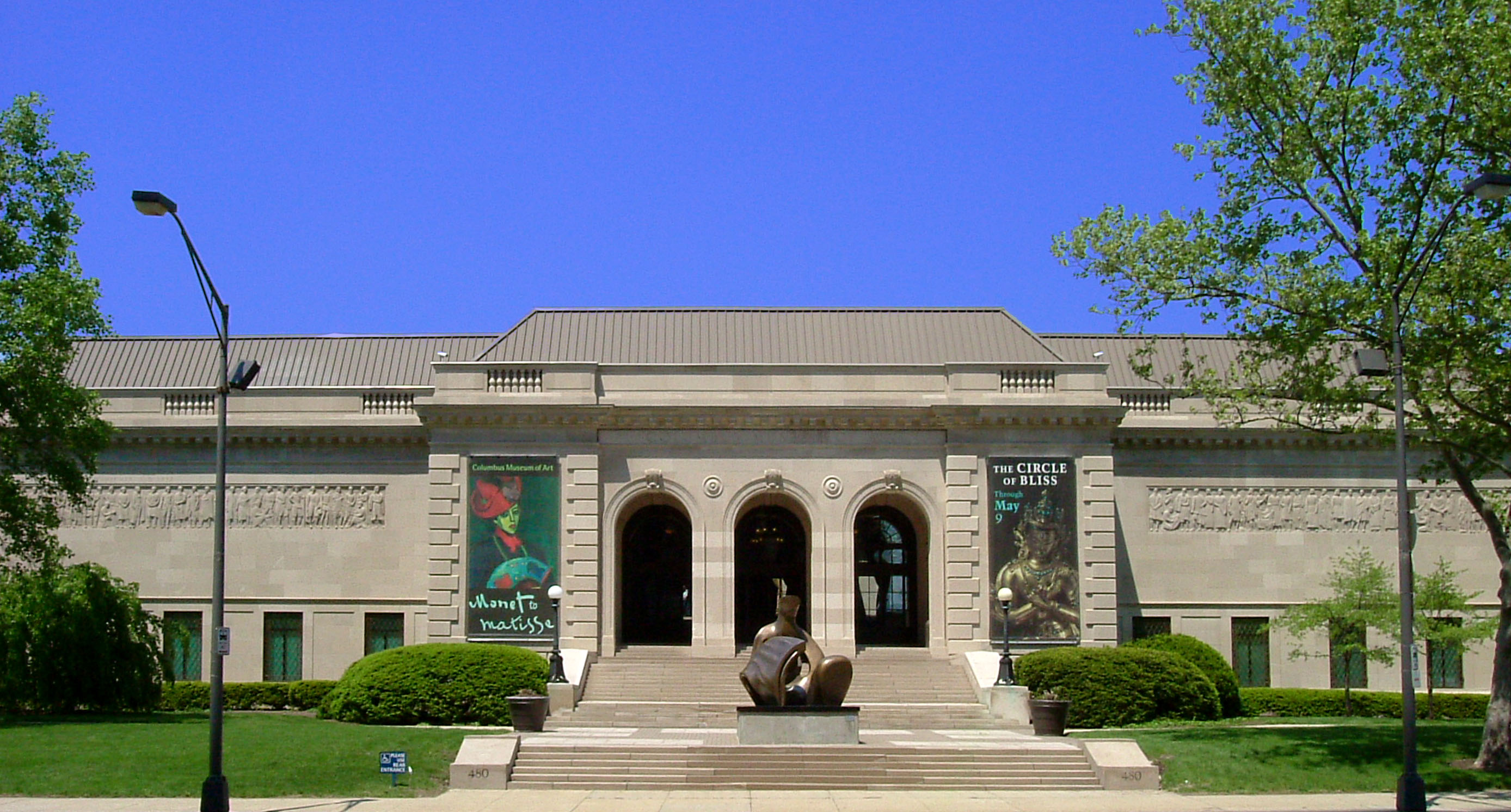
The Ross Building, built in 1931

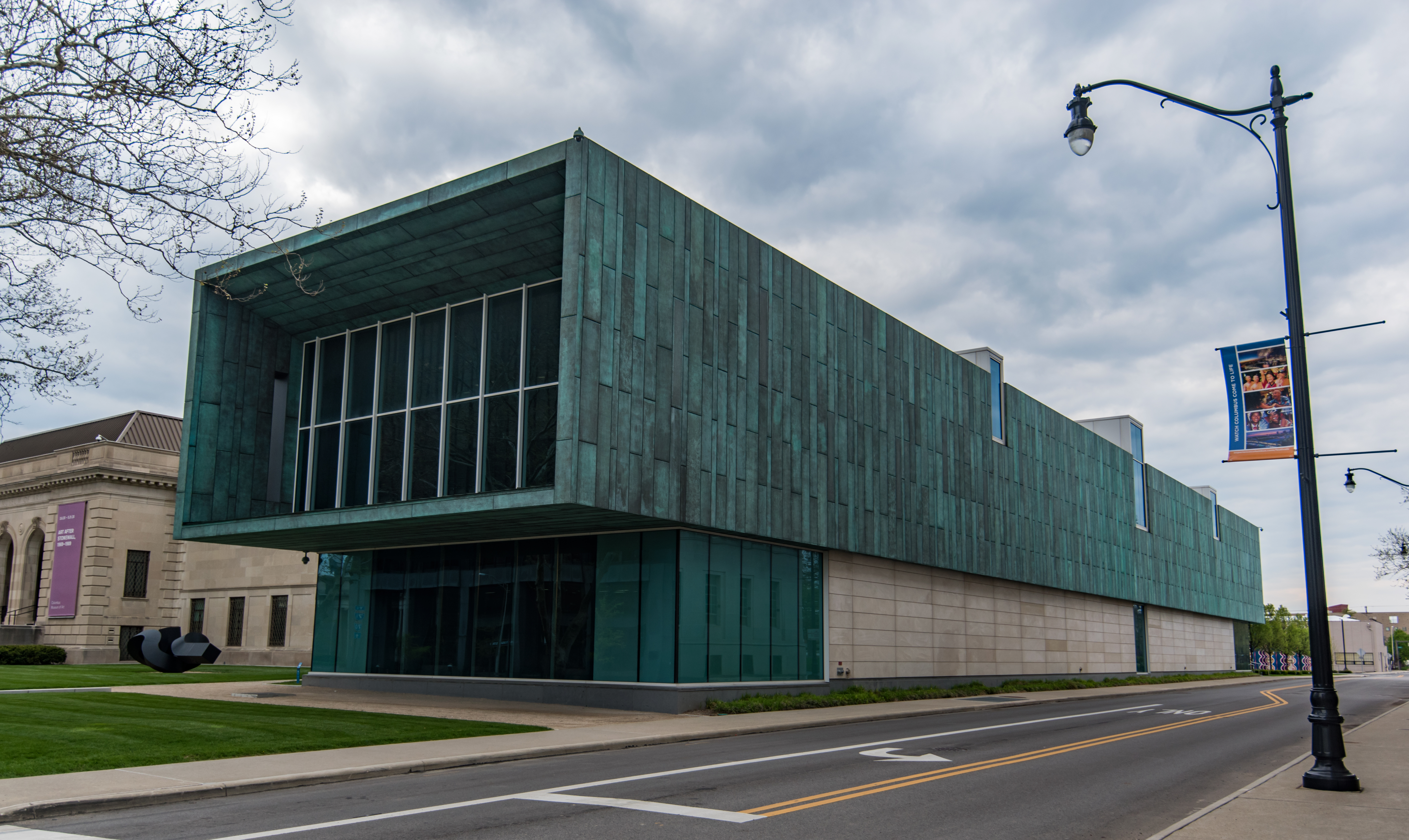
The Walter Wing, built in 2015

== Collections ==
The permanent collection includes outstanding late nineteenth and early twentieth-century American and European modern works of art. Major collections include the Ferdinand Howald Collection of early Modernist paintings, the Sirak Collection of Impressionist and Expressionist works, the Photo League Collection, and the Philip and Suzanne Schiller Collection of American Social Commentary Art. The Museum houses the largest collections of works by Columbus born artists Aminah Brenda Lynn Robinson, Elijah Pierce, and George Bellows.

Highlights include early Cubist paintings by Pablo Picasso and Juan Gris, works by François Boucher, Paul Cézanne, Mary Cassatt, Jean Auguste Dominique Ingres, Edgar Degas, Henri Matisse, Claude Monet, Edward Hopper, and Norman Rockwell, and installations by Mel Chin, Josiah McElheny, Susan Philipsz, and Allan Sekula.

Sculptures include: Hare on Ball and Claw, Intermediate Model for the Arch, Out of There, The Family of Man: Figure 2, Ancestor II, The Mountain, Three-Piece Reclining Figure: Draped 1975, Two Lines Up Excentric Variation VI, Wasahaban.

The collection can be browsed on the museum's website.

== Selections from the permanent collection ==
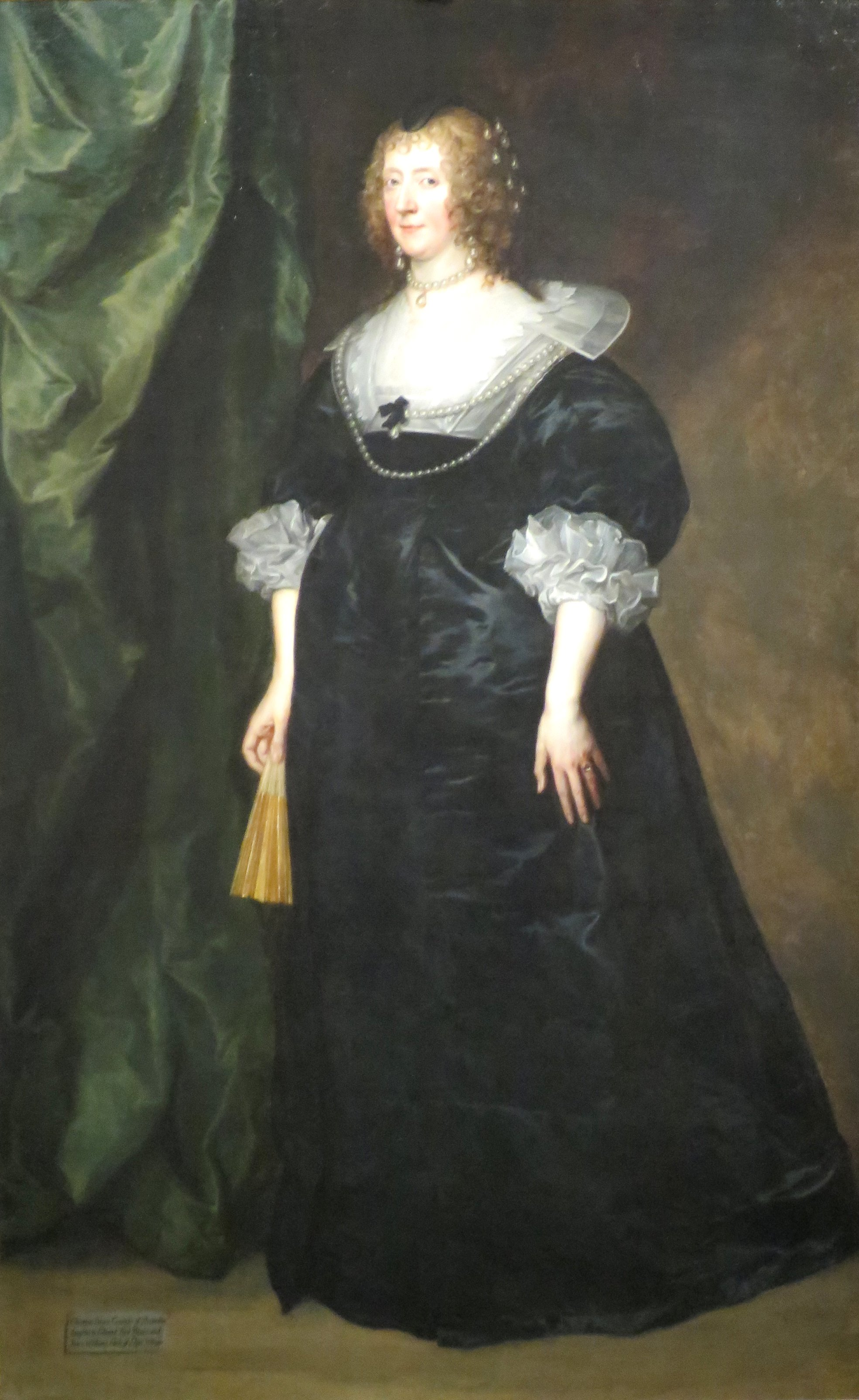
Anthony van Dyck, Christian Bruce, 1635

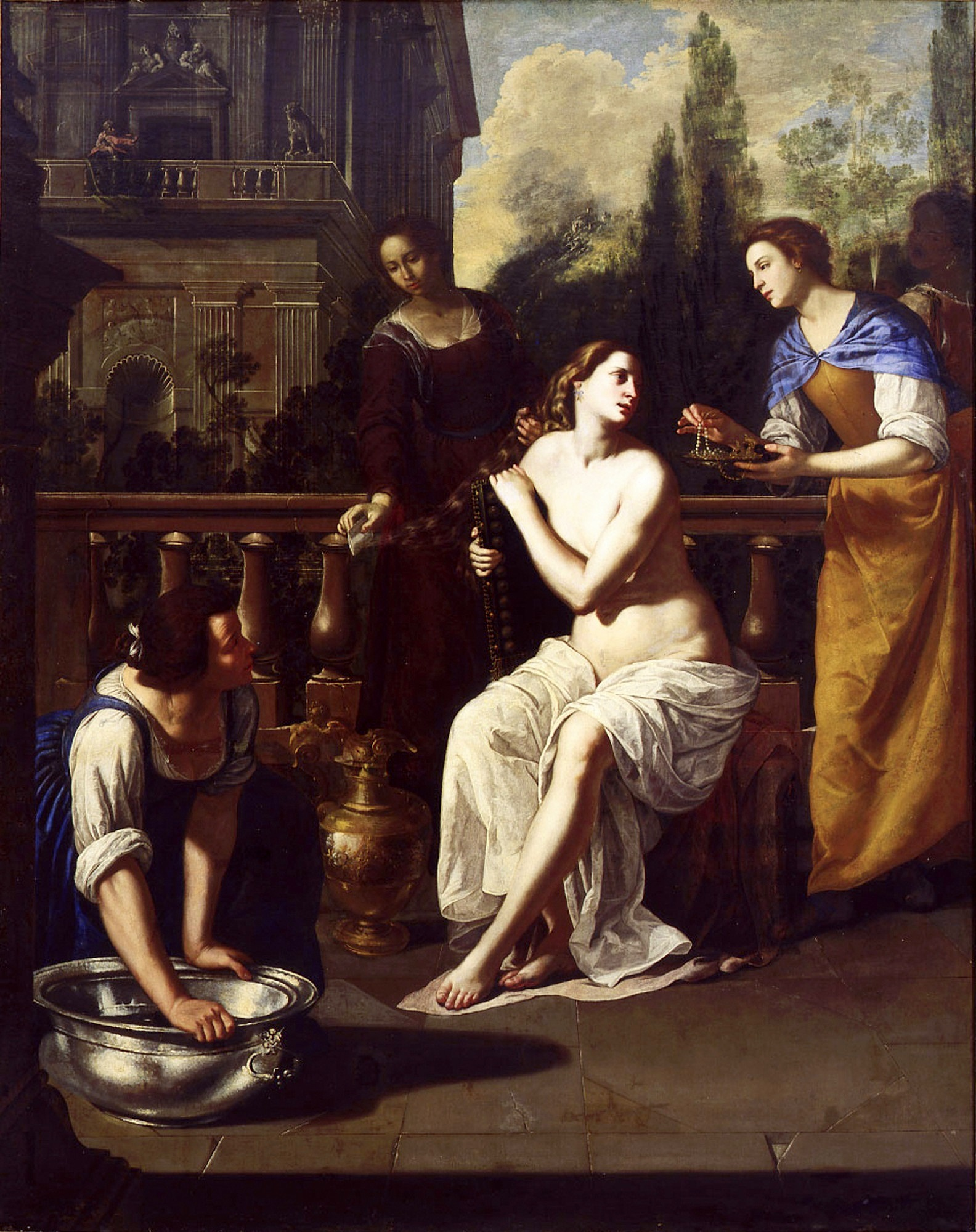
Artemisia Gentileschi, David and Bathsheba, c. 1610–1675

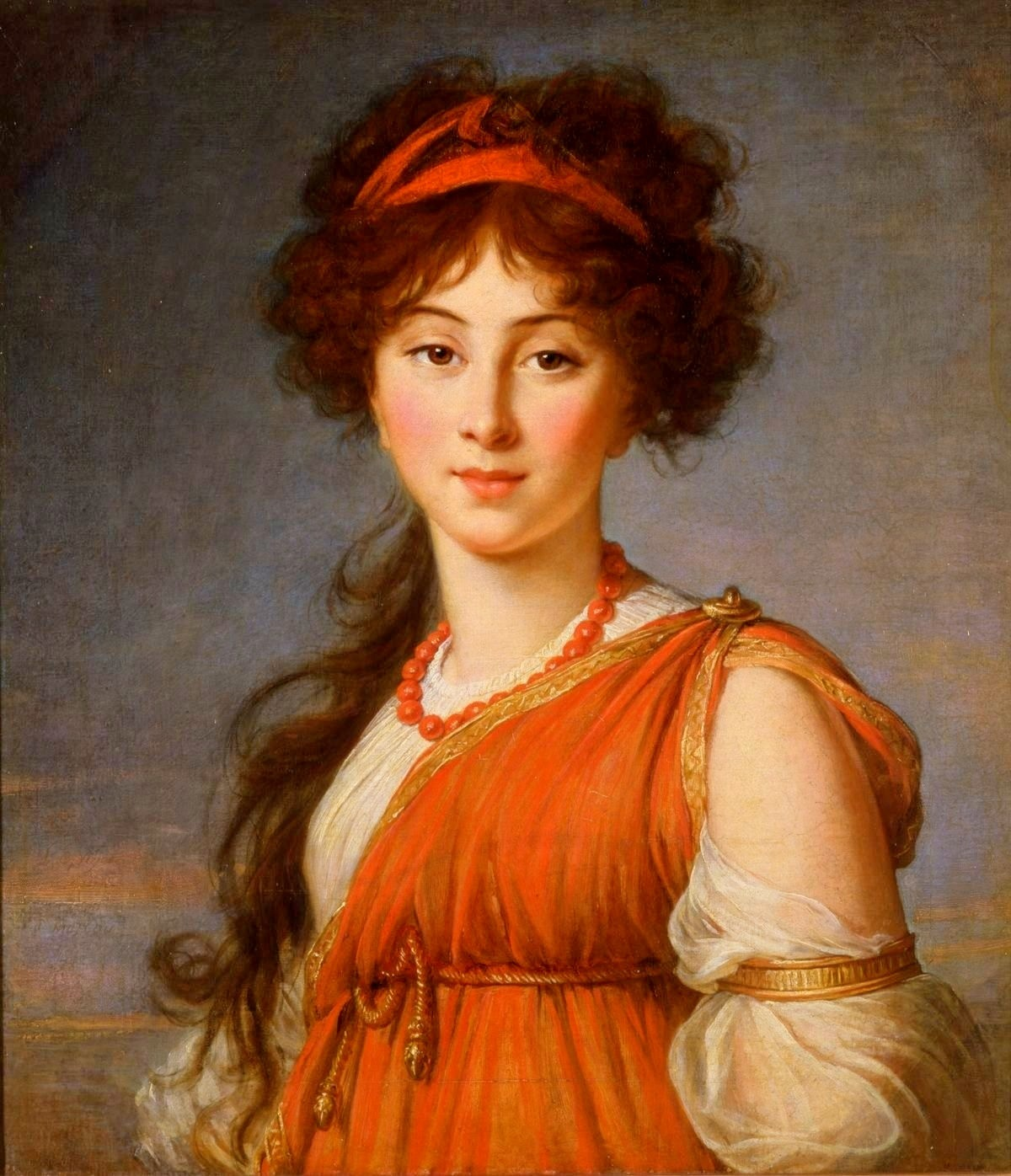
Elisabeth Vigée-Lebrun, Varvara Naryshkina, 1800

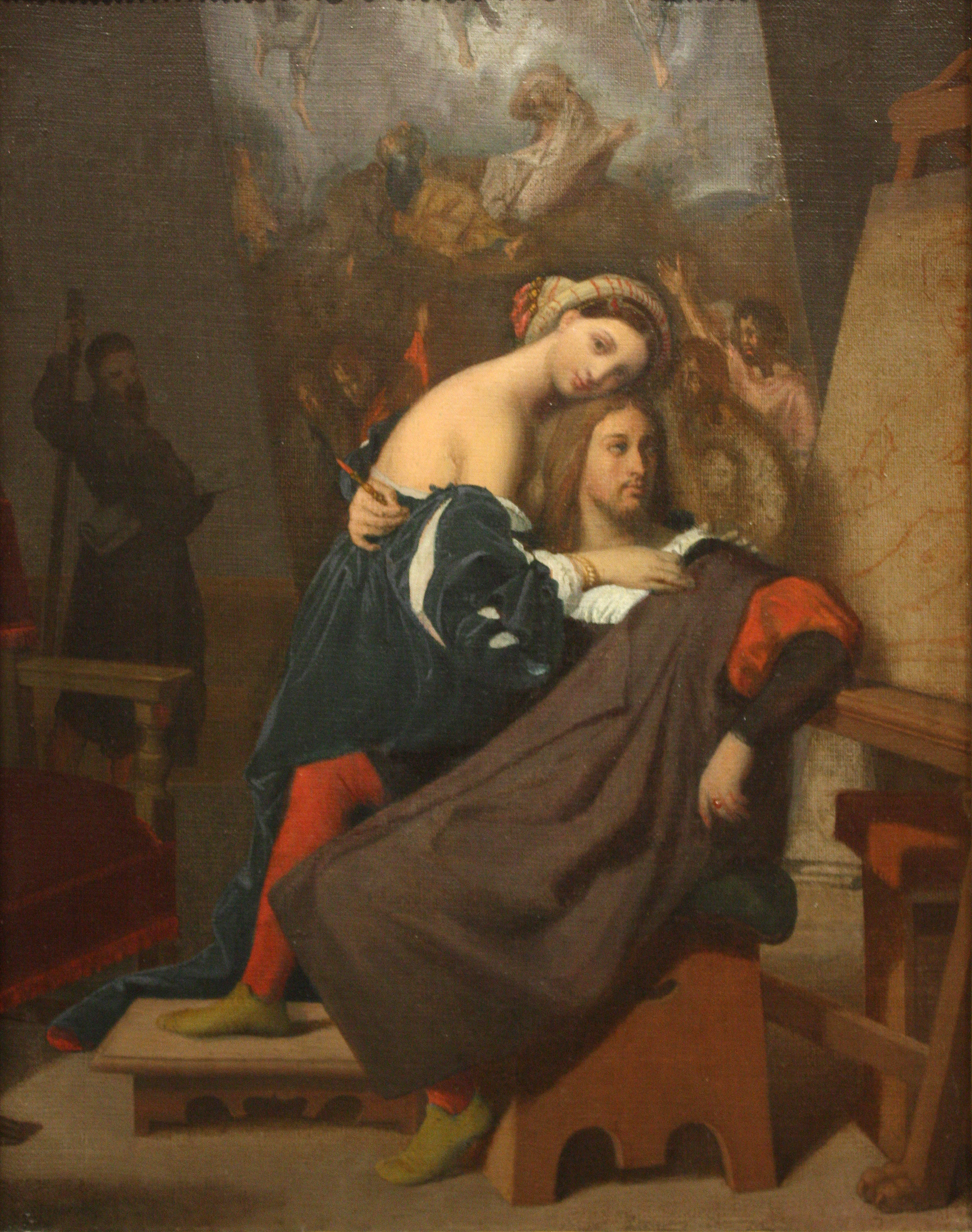
Jean-Auguste-Dominique Ingres, Raphael and the Baker's Daughter, 1840

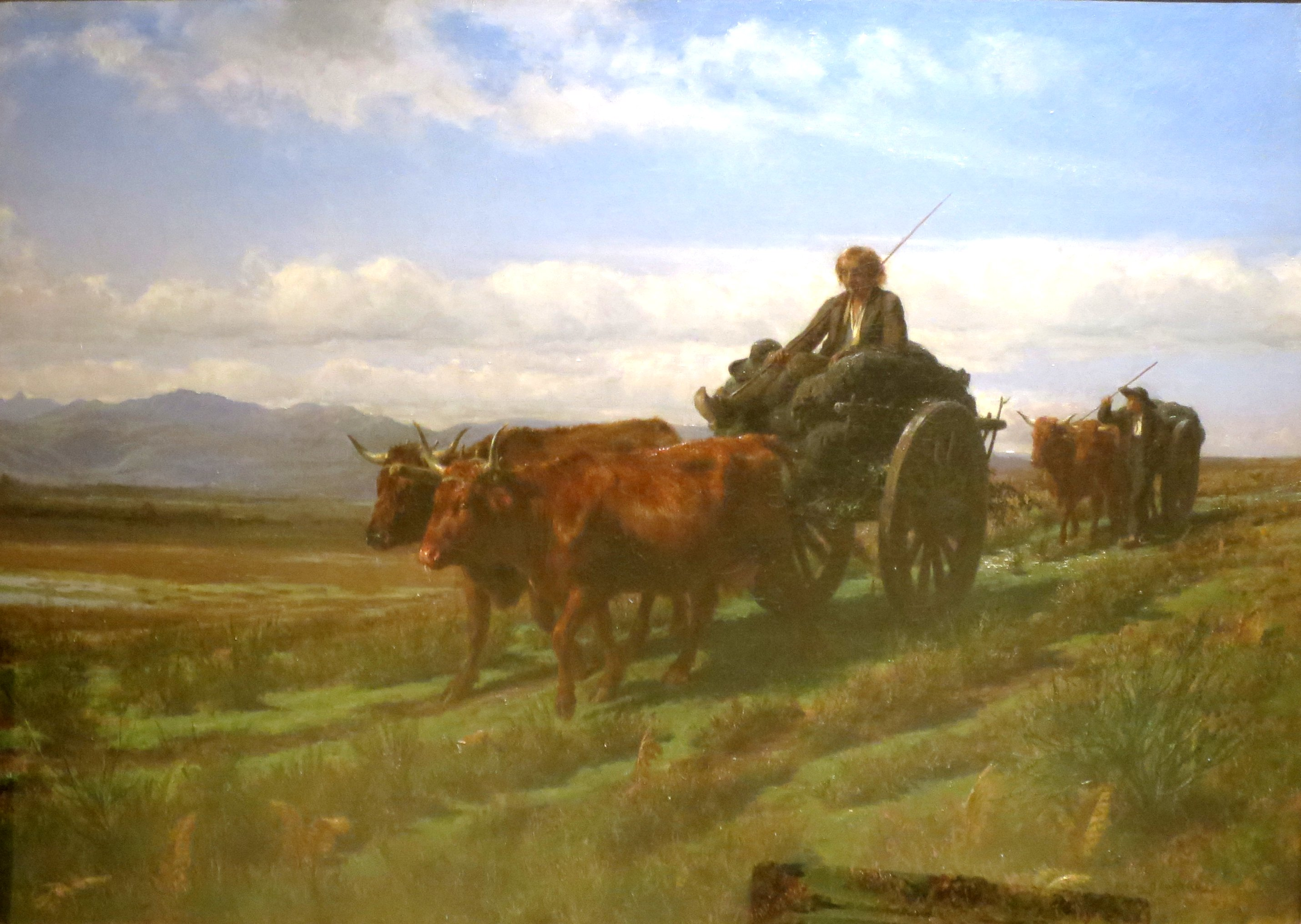
Rosa Bonheur, The Coal Carriers, 1851

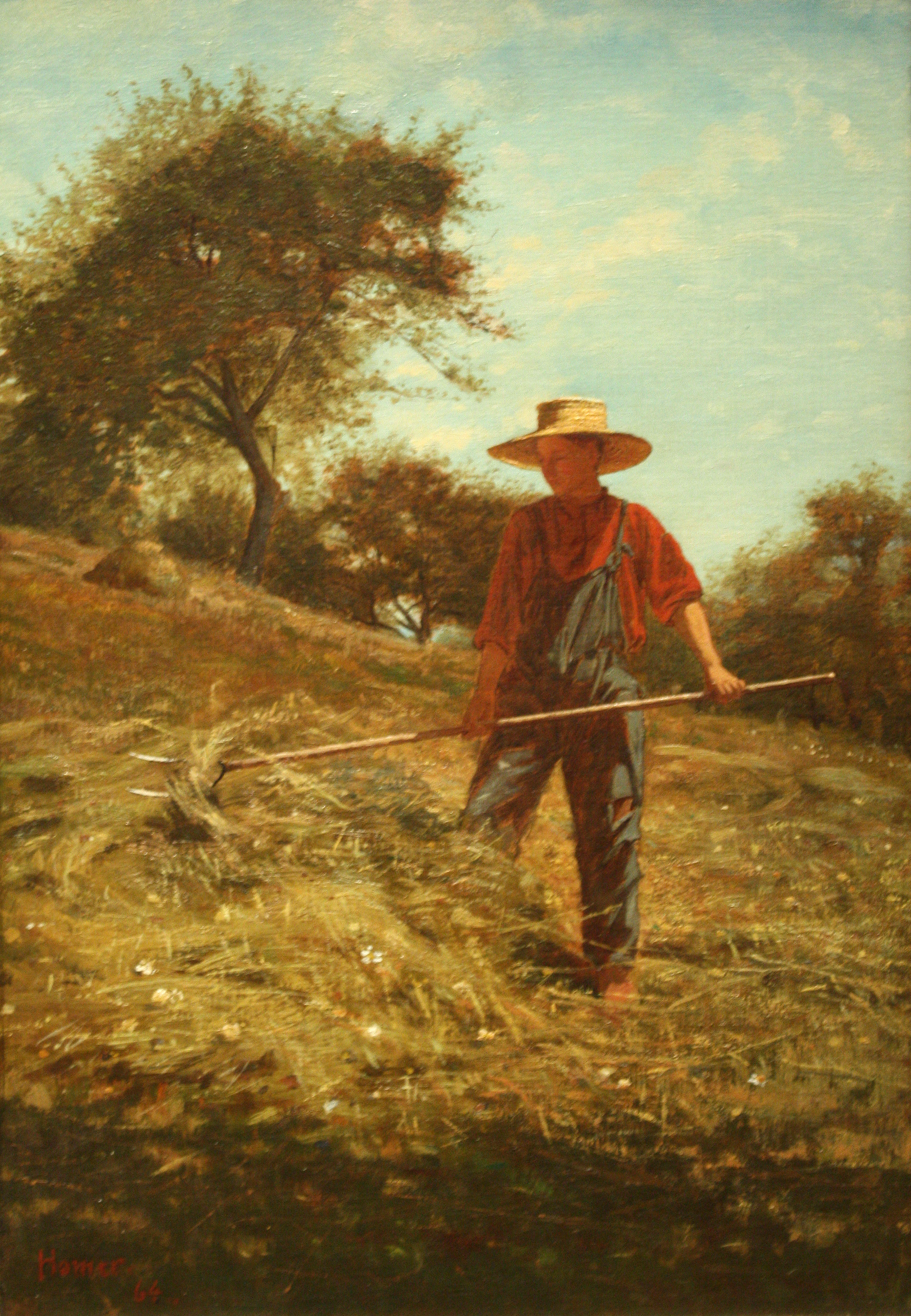
Winslow Homer, Haymaking, 1864

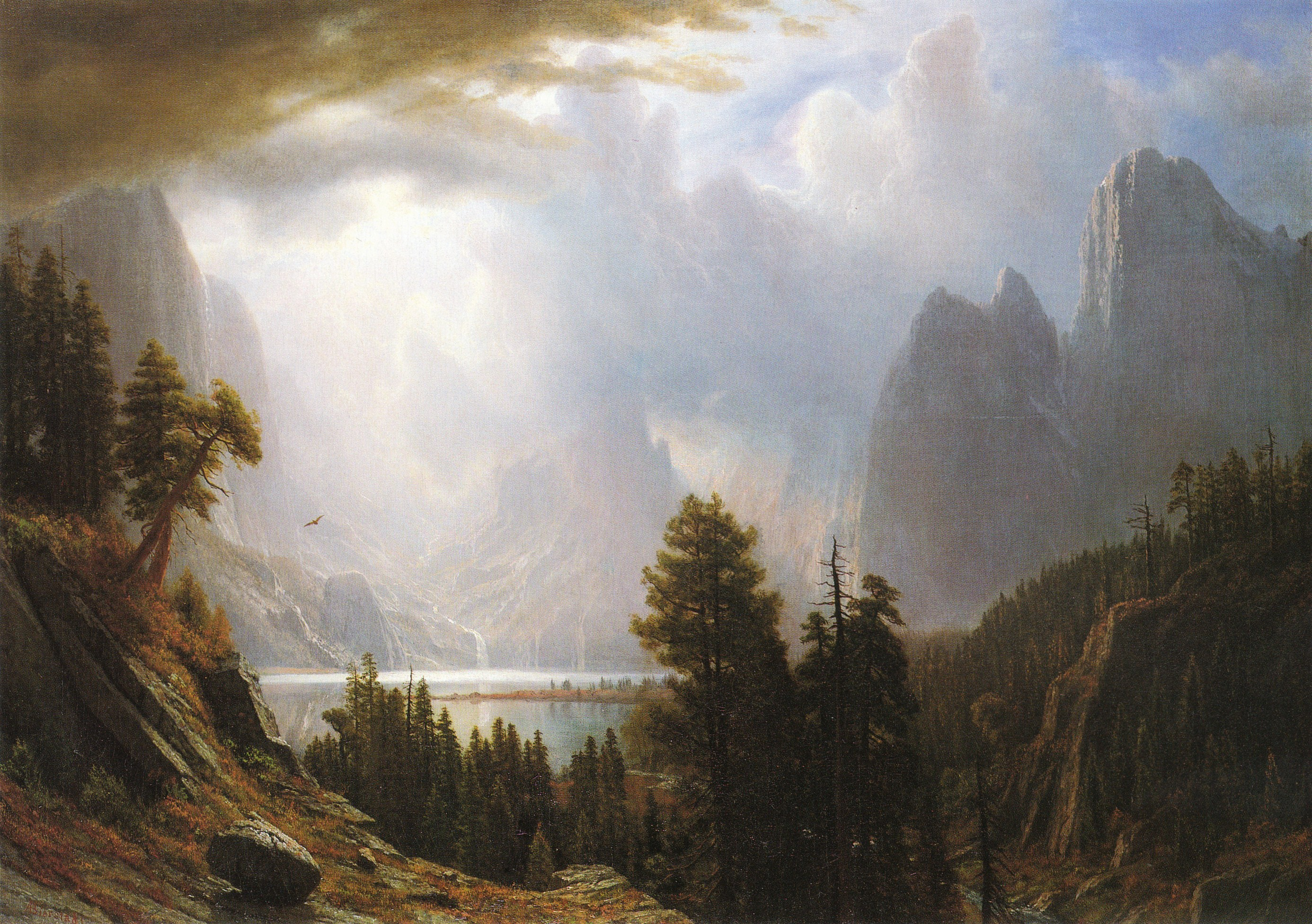
Albert Bierstadt, Landscape, c. 1867–1869

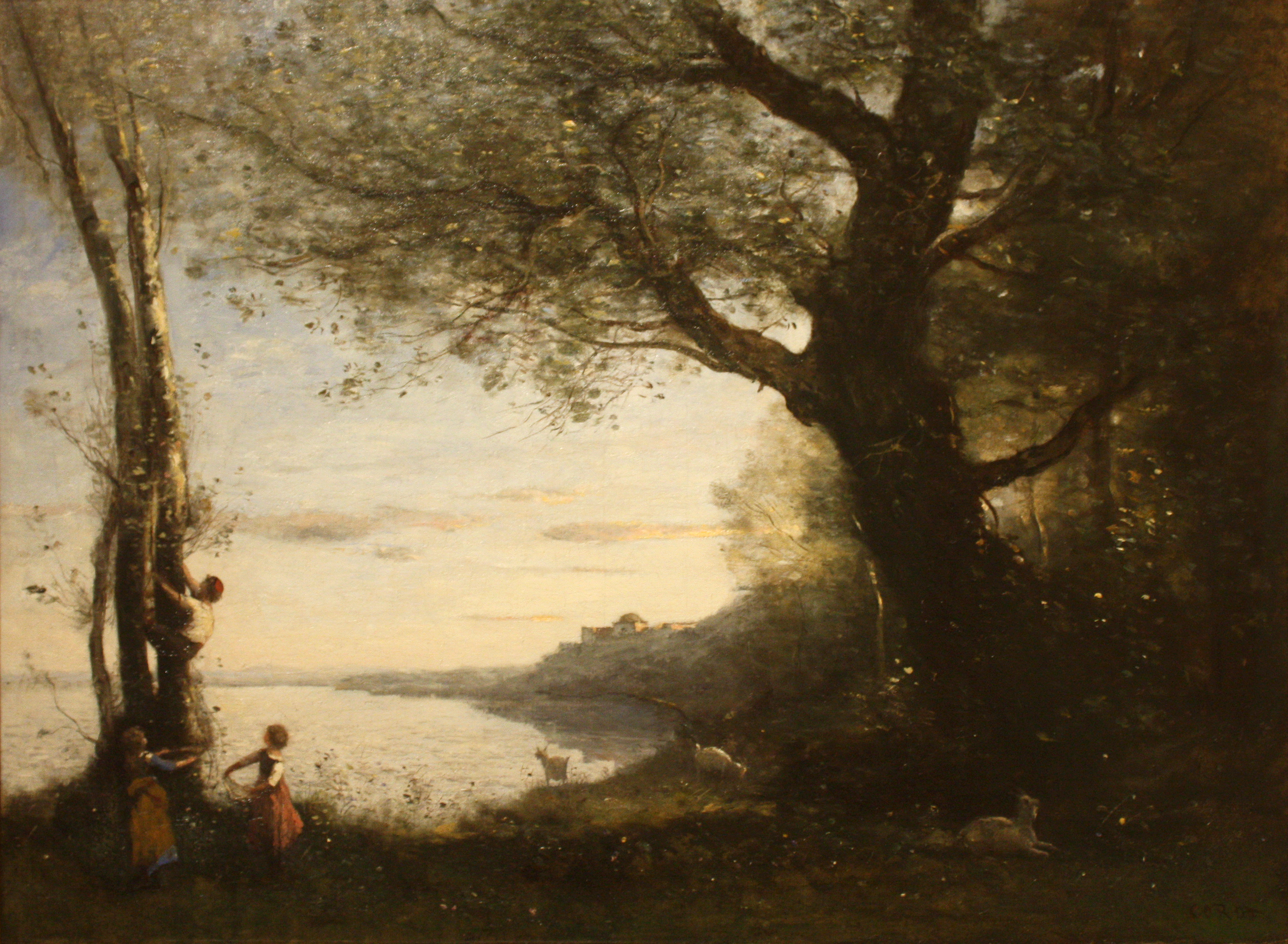
Camille Corot, The Little Bird Nesters, 1873

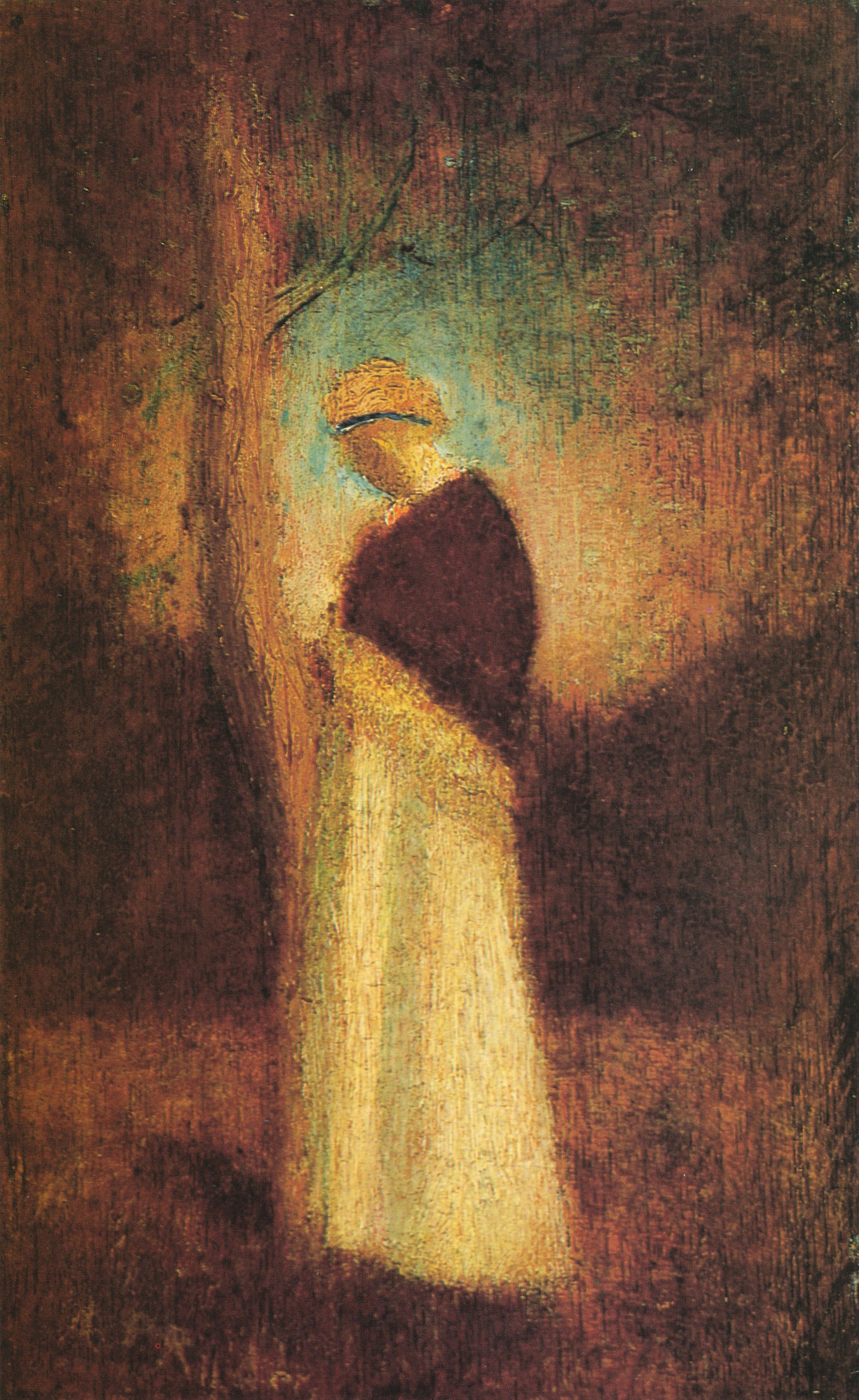
Albert Pinkham Ryder, Spirit of Autumn, 1875

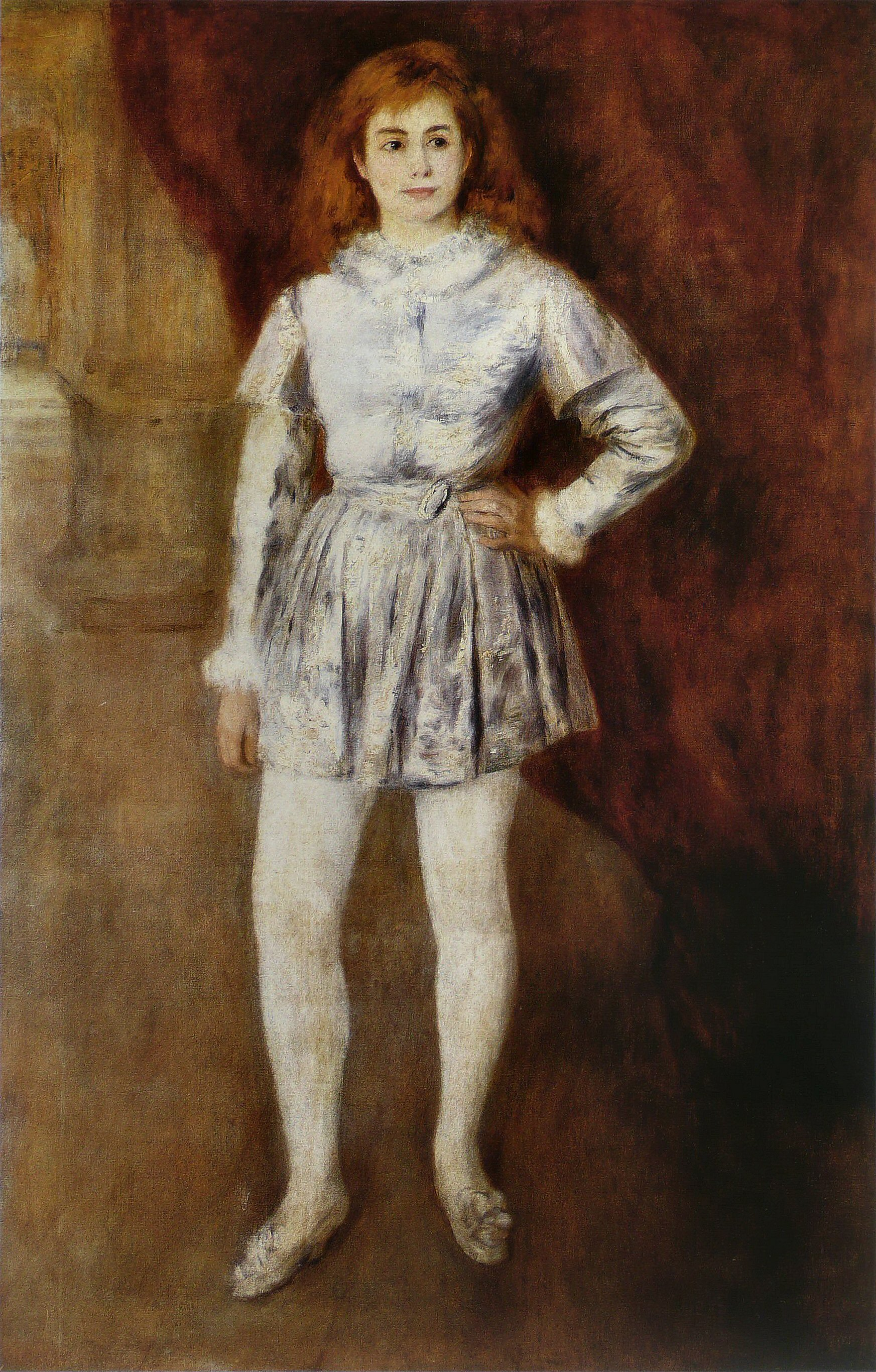
Pierre-Auguste Renoir, Madame Henriot 'en travesti' (The Page), 1875–76

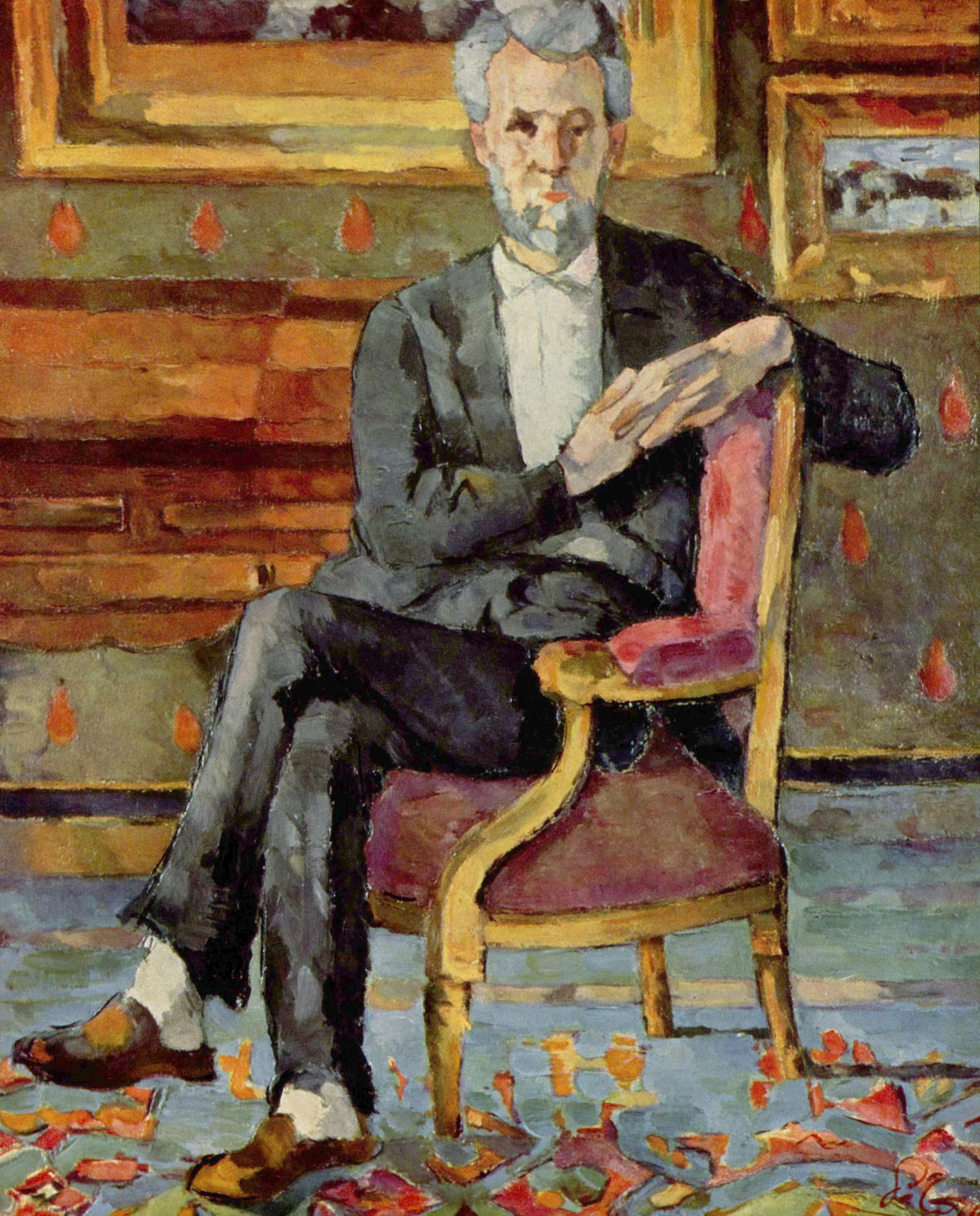
Paul Cézanne, portrait of Victor Chocquet, 1877

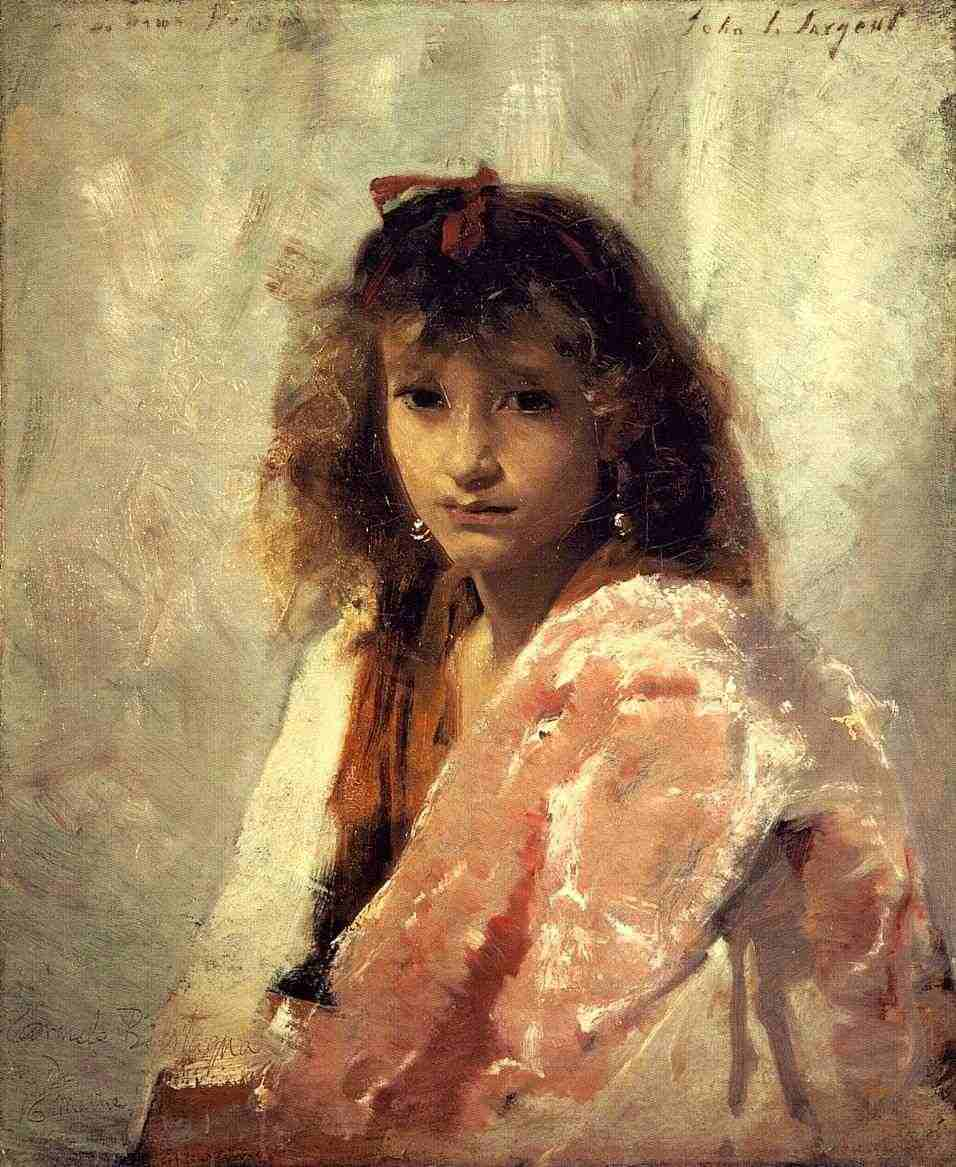
John Singer Sargent
Carmela Bertagna
Oil on canvas, 1879

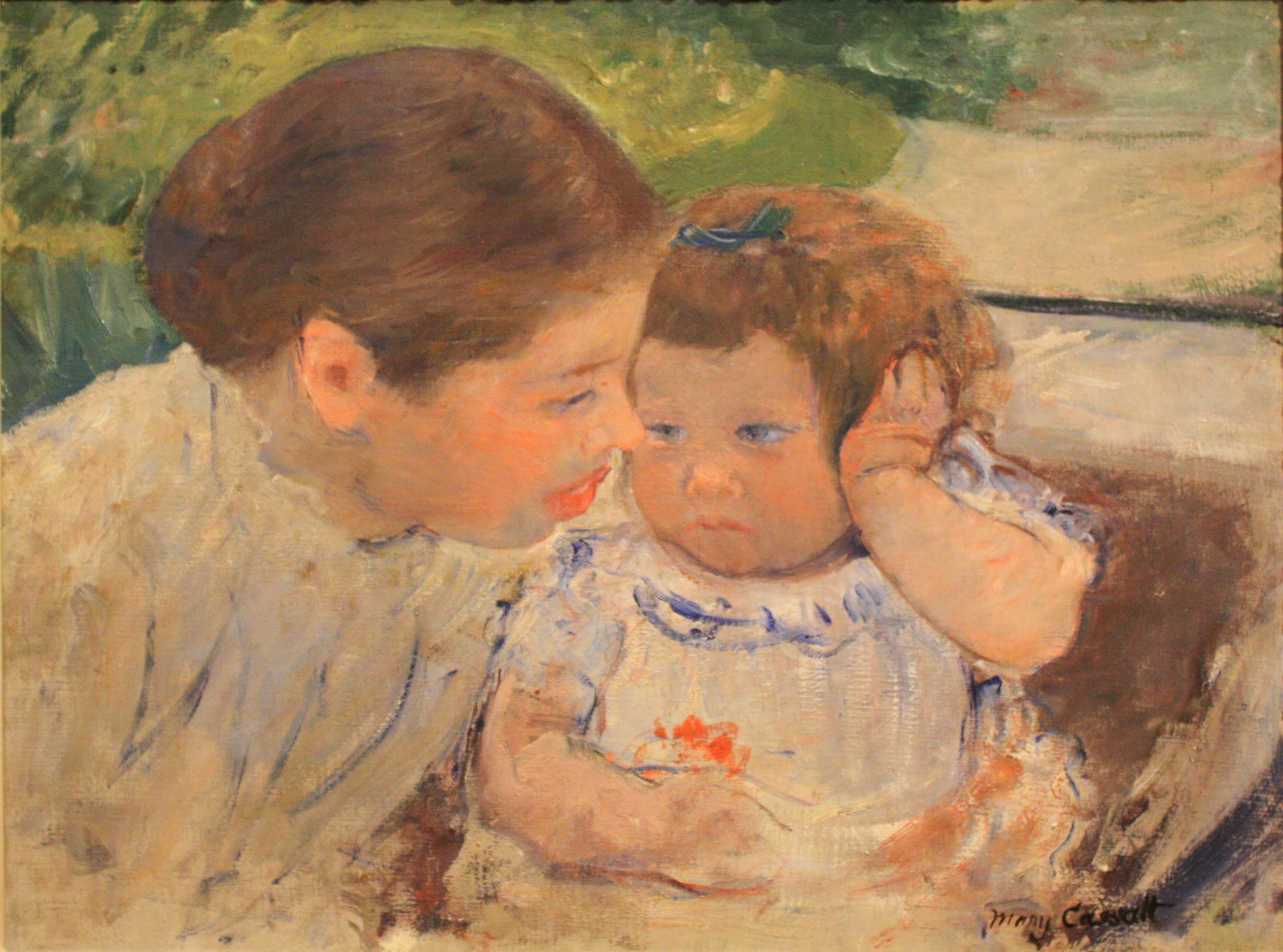
Mary Cassatt, Susan Comforting the Baby No. 1, c. 1881

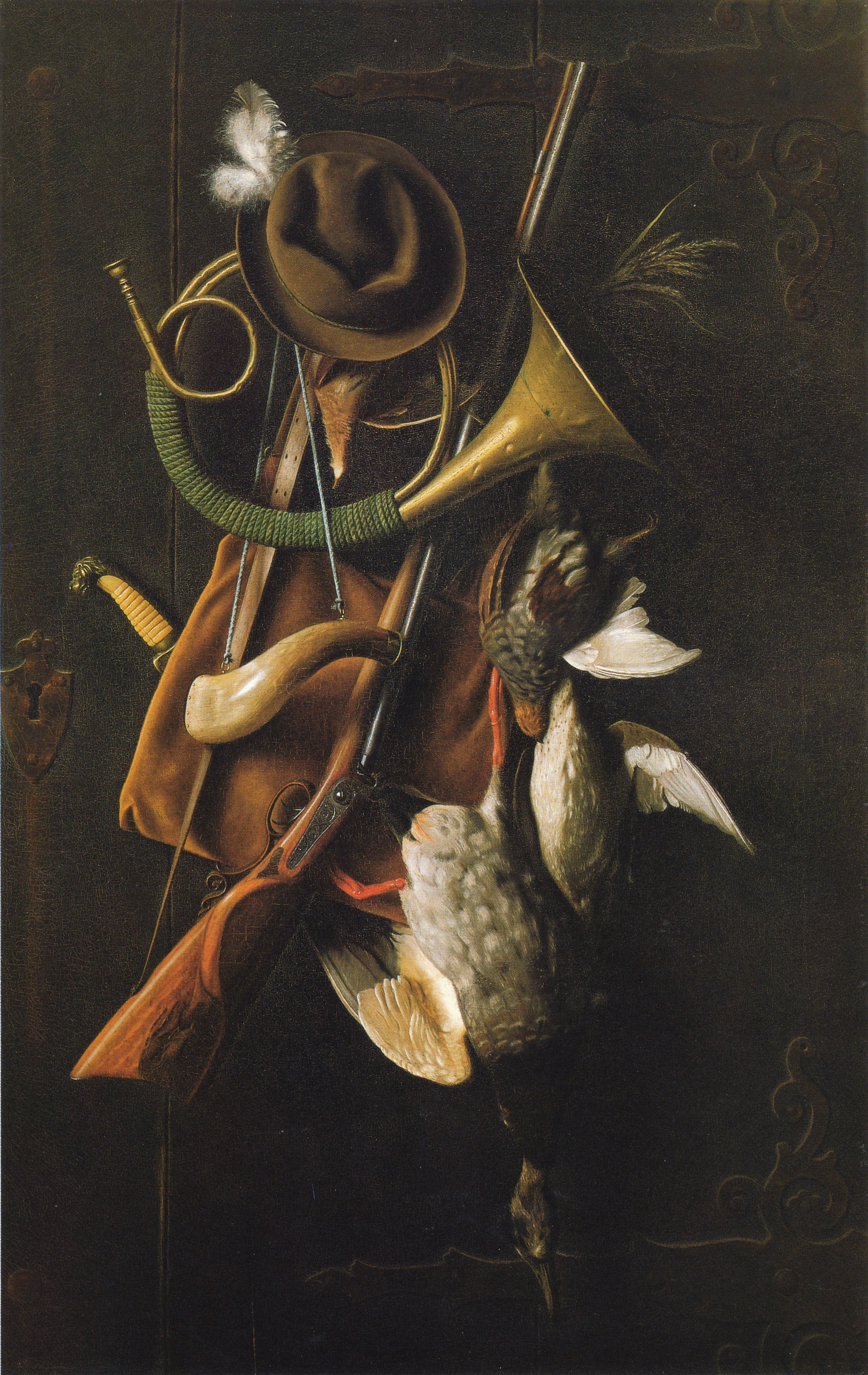
William Michael Harnett, After the Hunt, 1883

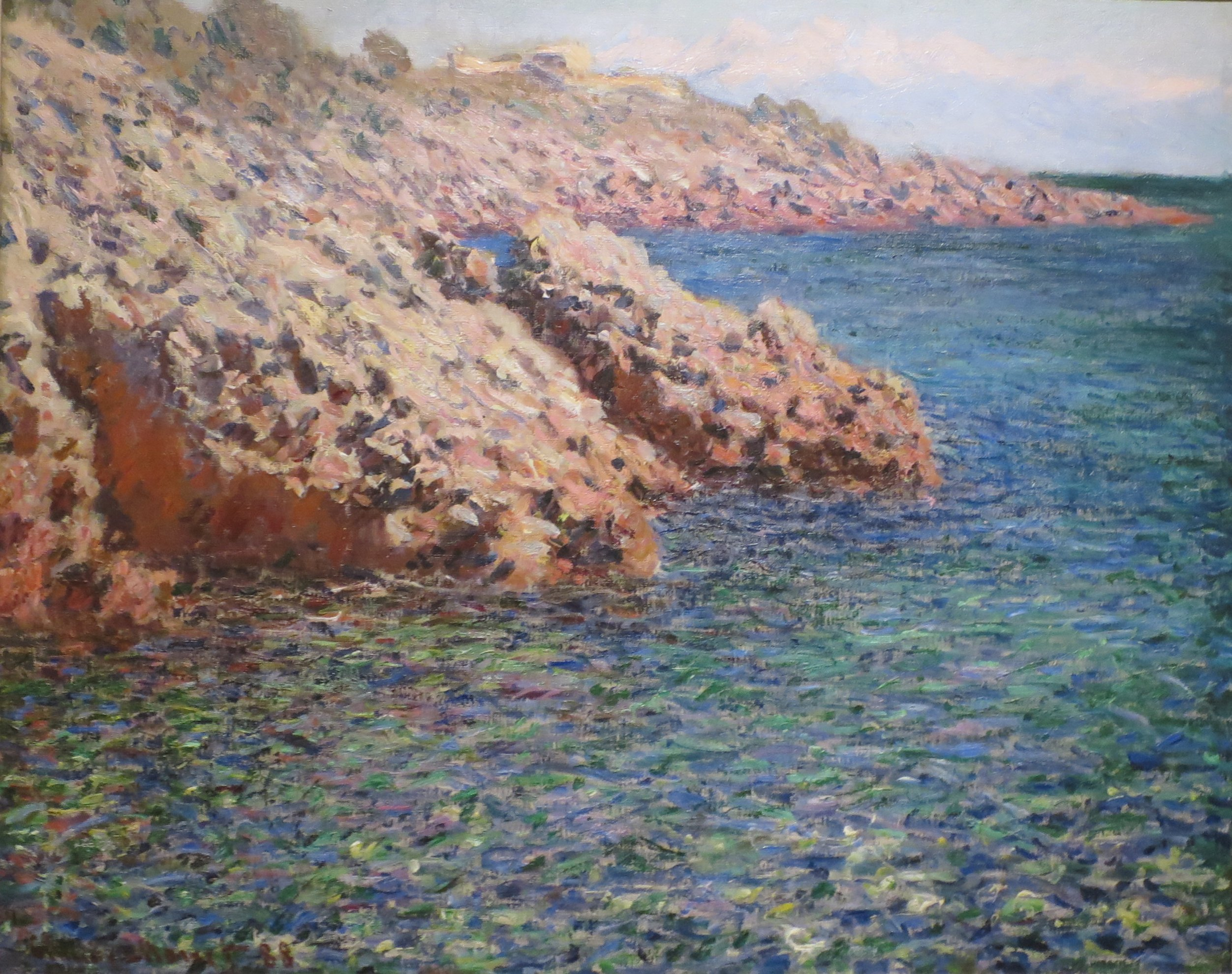
Claude Monet, The Mediterranean (Cap d'Antibes), 1888

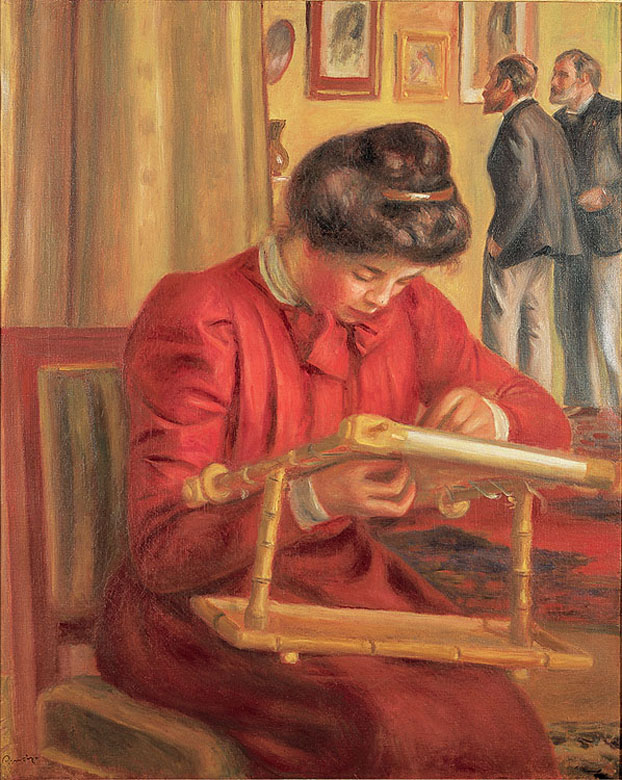
Pierre-Auguste Renoir, Christine Lerolle Embroidering, c. 1895

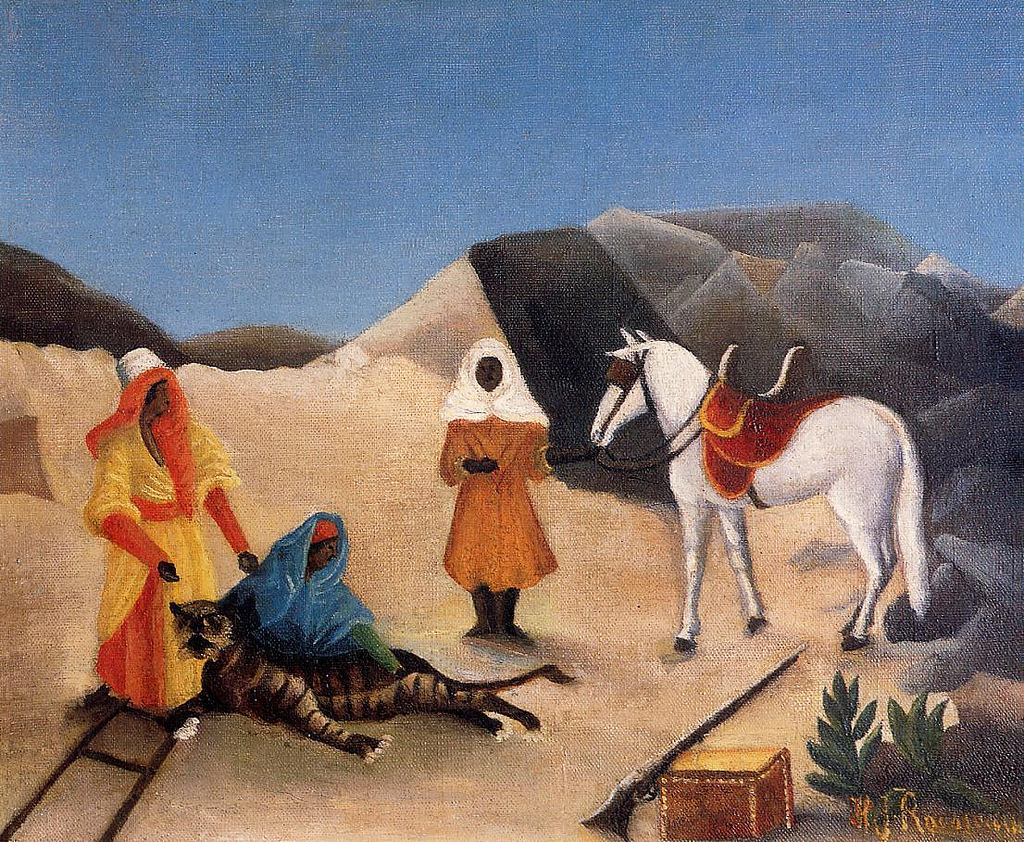
Henri Rousseau, Tiger Hunt, c. 1895

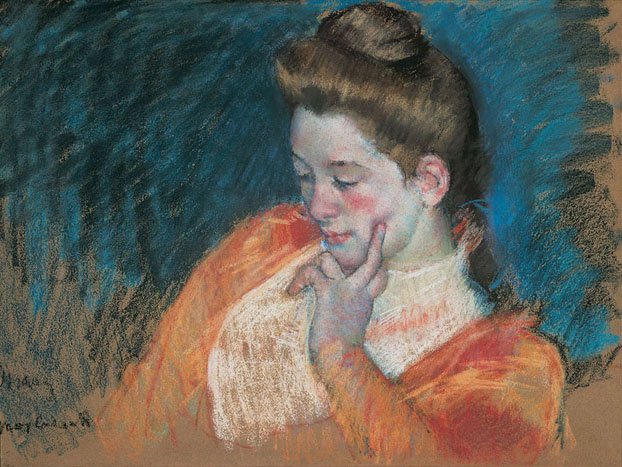
Mary Cassatt
Portrait of a Young Woman, Pastel on paper, 1898

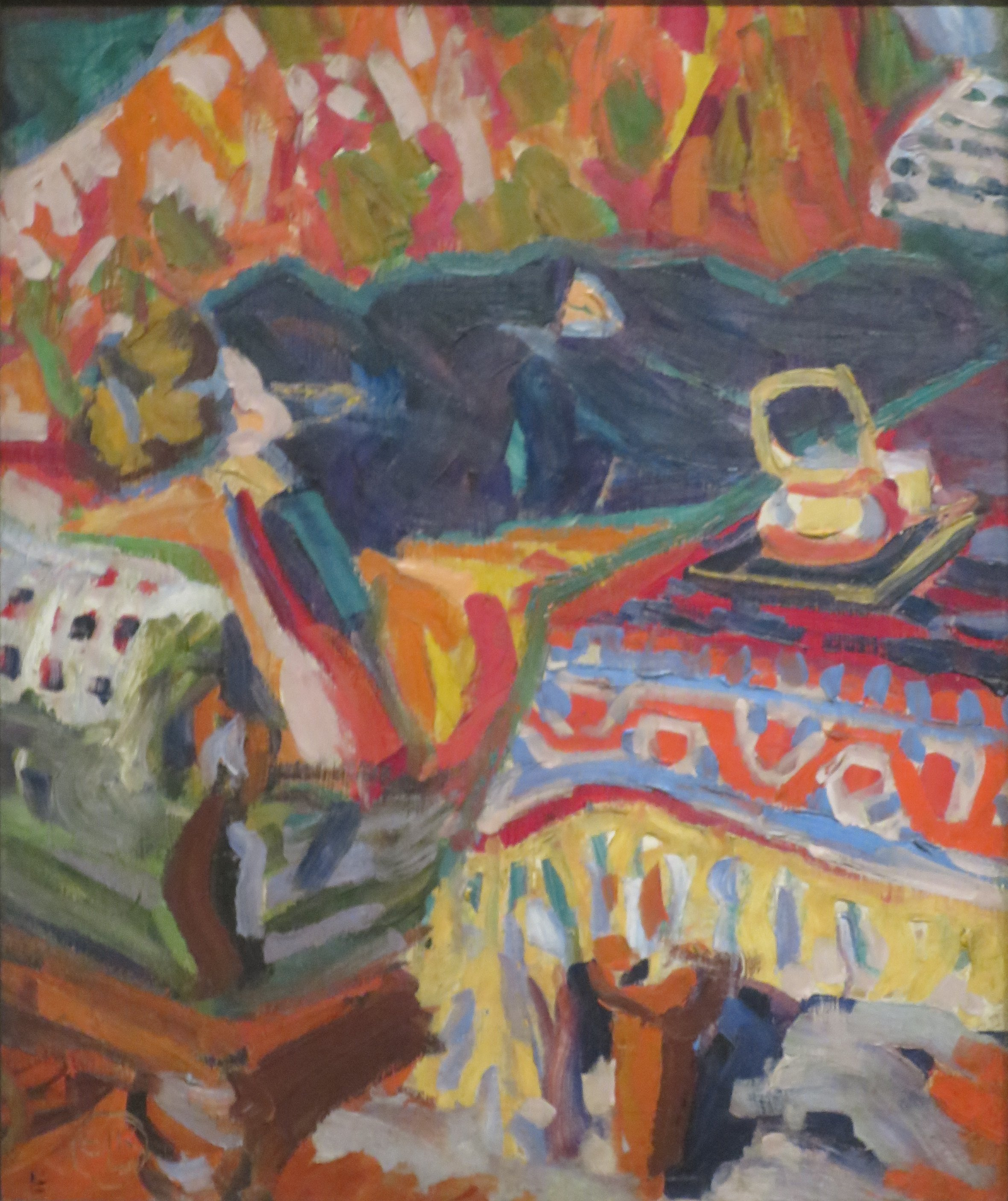
Ernst Ludwig Kirchner, Girl Asleep, 1905–06

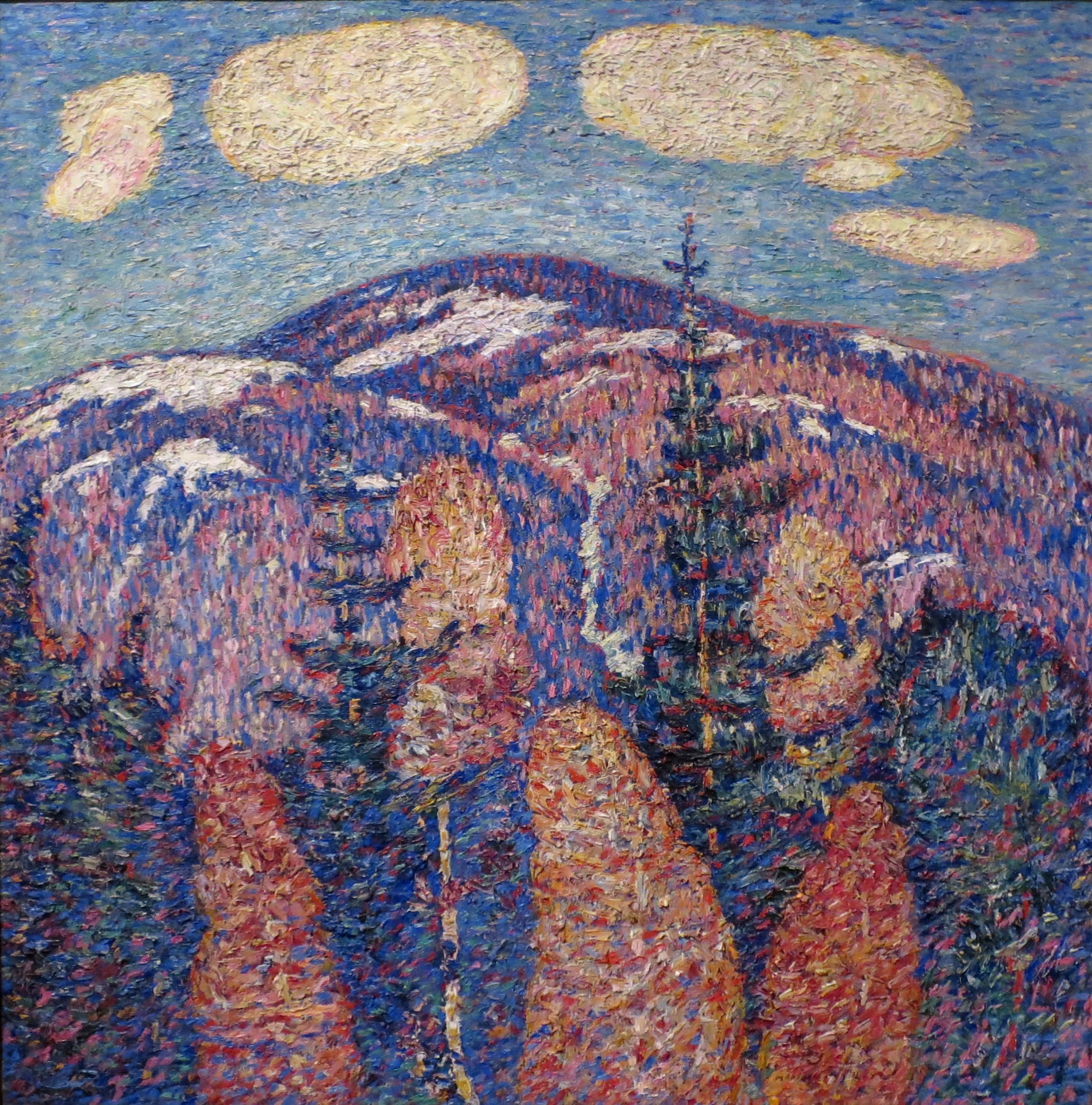
Marsden Hartley, Cosmos, Oil on Canvas, 1908–09

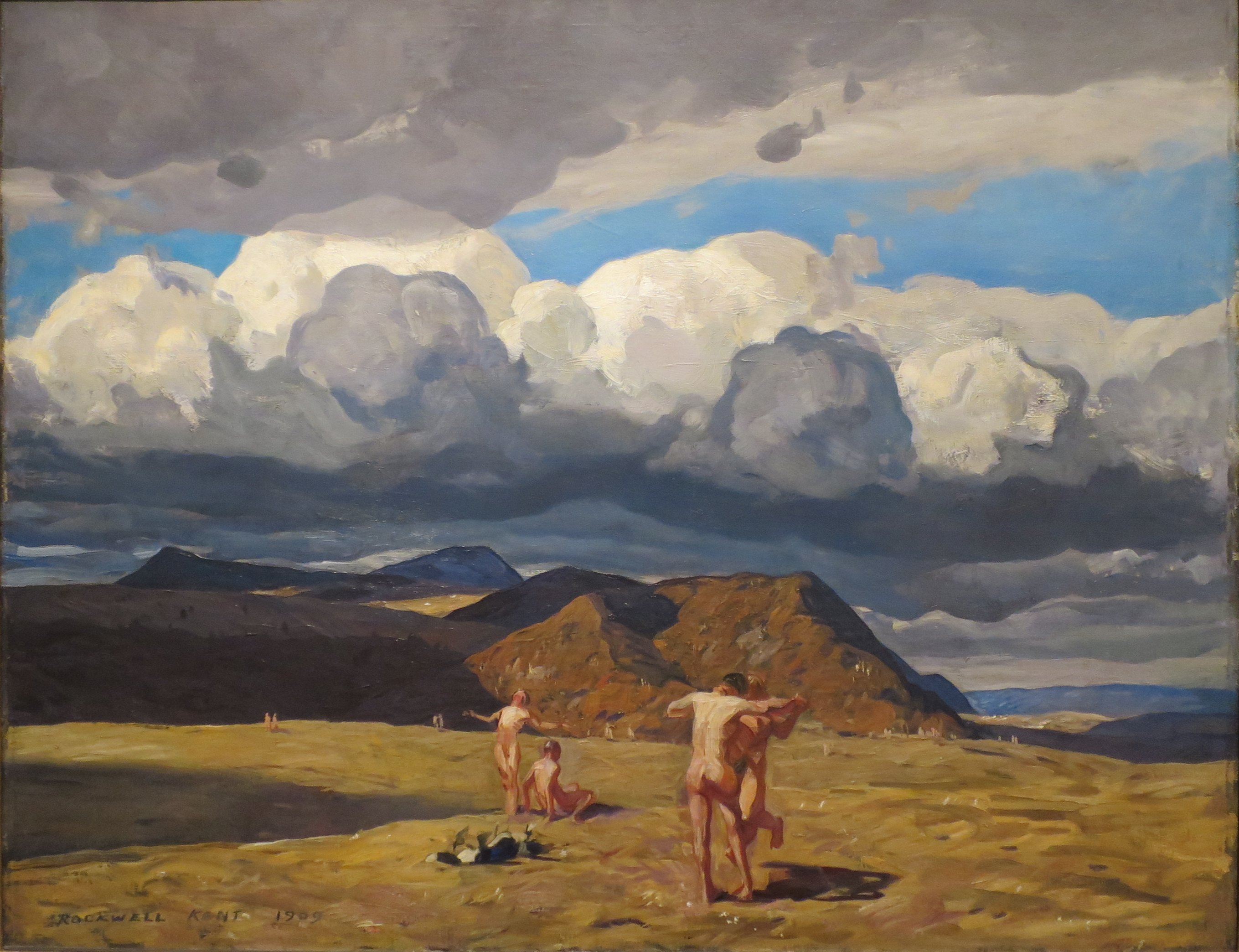
Rockwell Kent, Men and Mountains, 1909

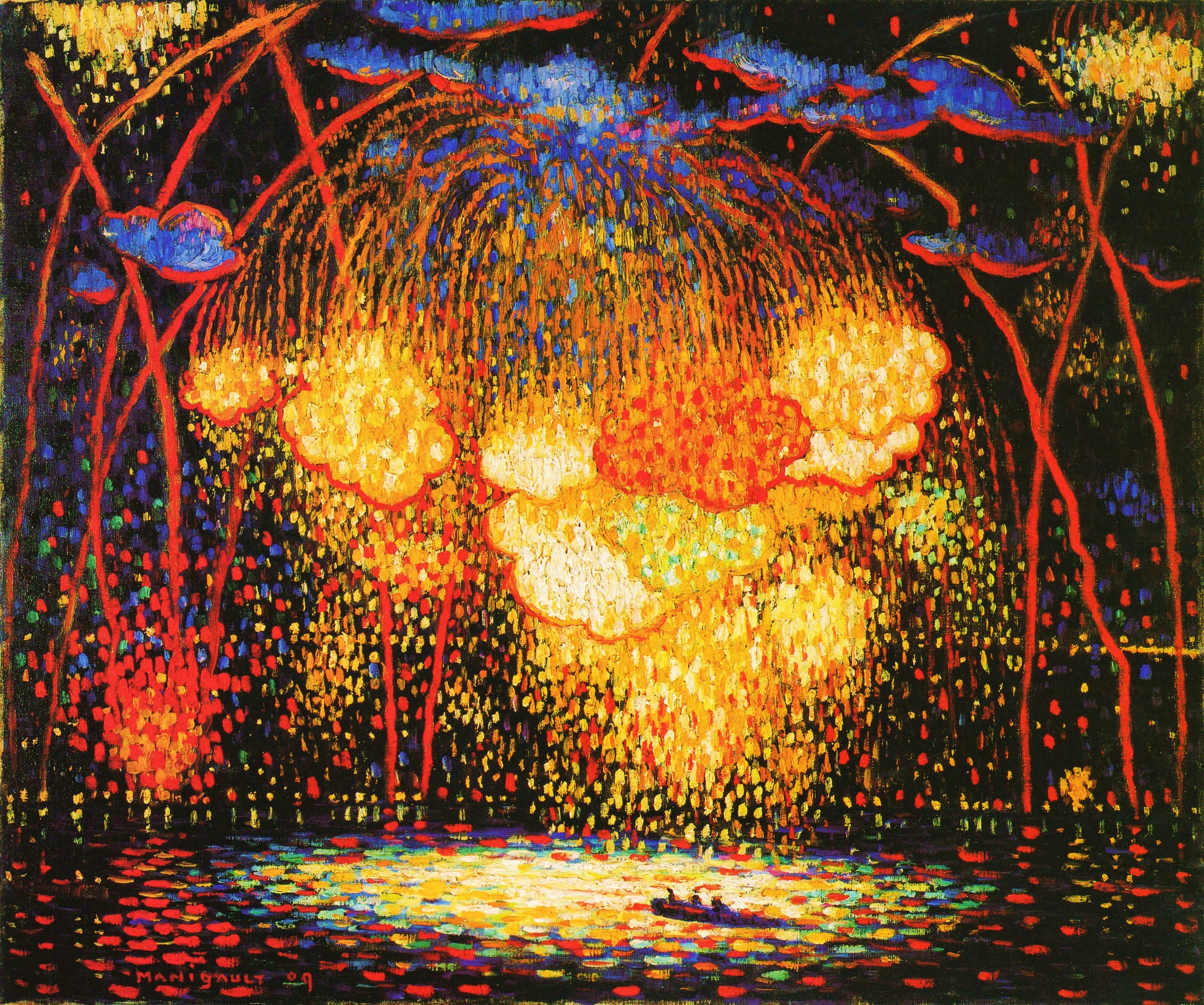
Edward Middleton Manigault - The Rocket, 1909

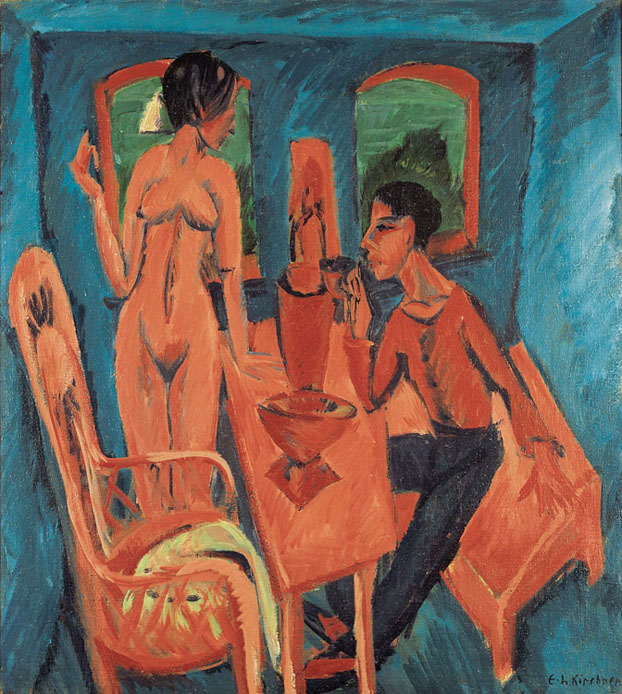
Ernst Ludwig Kirchner, Tower Room, Fehmarn, 1913

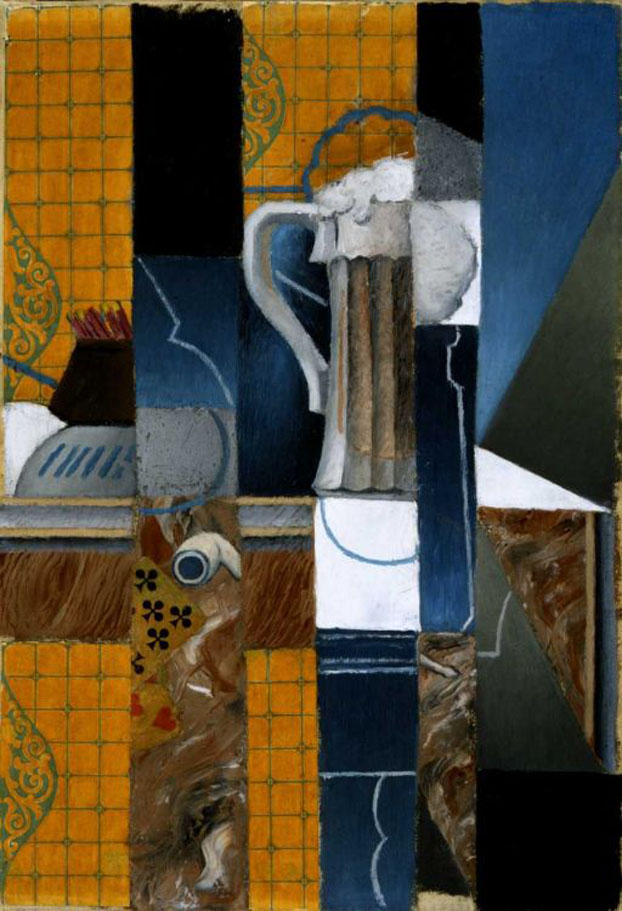
Juan Gris, Glass of Beer and Playing Cards, 1914

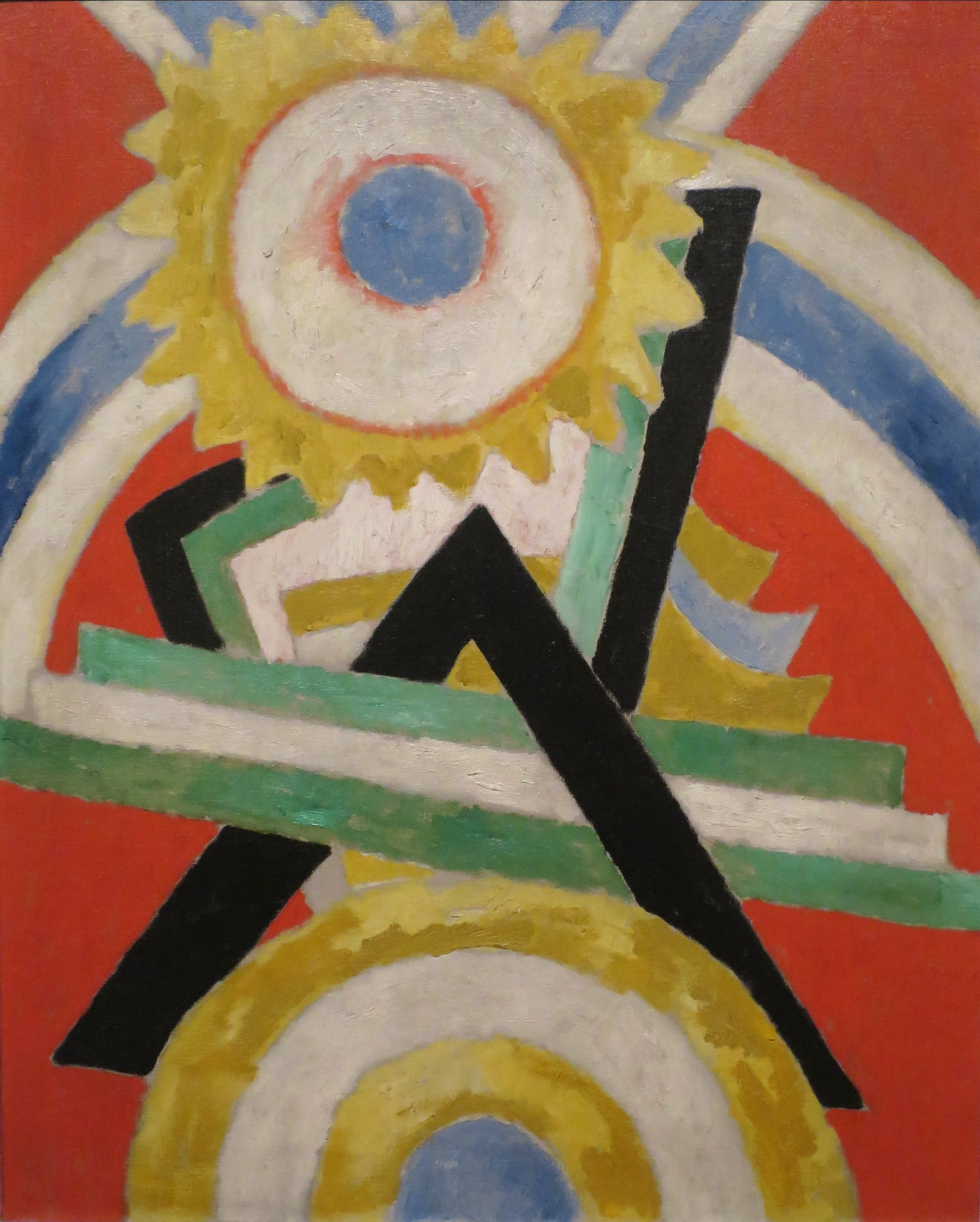
Marsden Hartley, Pre-War Pageant, 1914

Jacques Villon, Portrait de M. J. B. peintre (Jacques Bon), 1914

Pablo Picasso, Nature morte au compotier (Still Life with Compote and Glass), oil on canvas, 1914–15

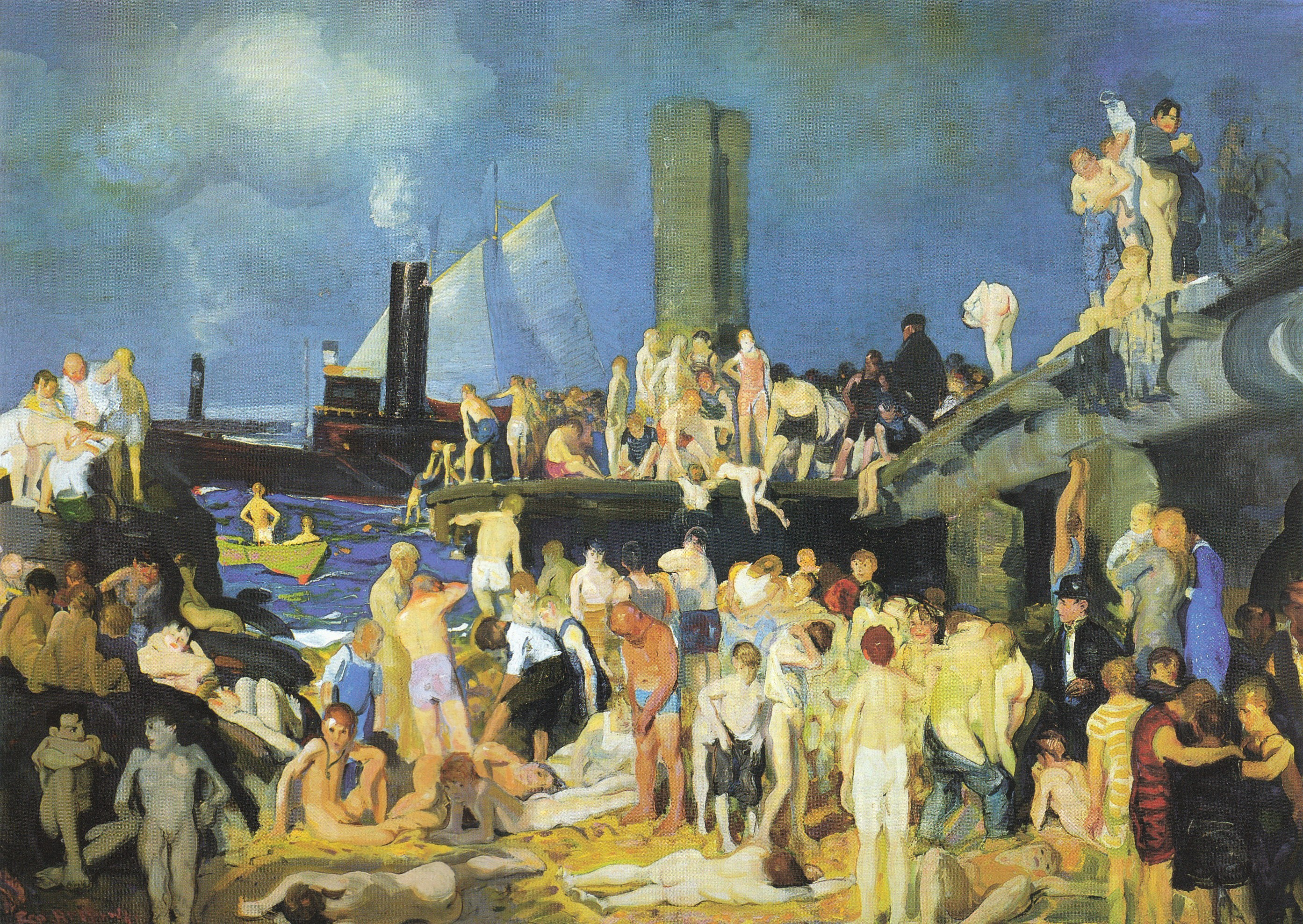
George Wesley Bellows, Riverfront No. 1, 1915

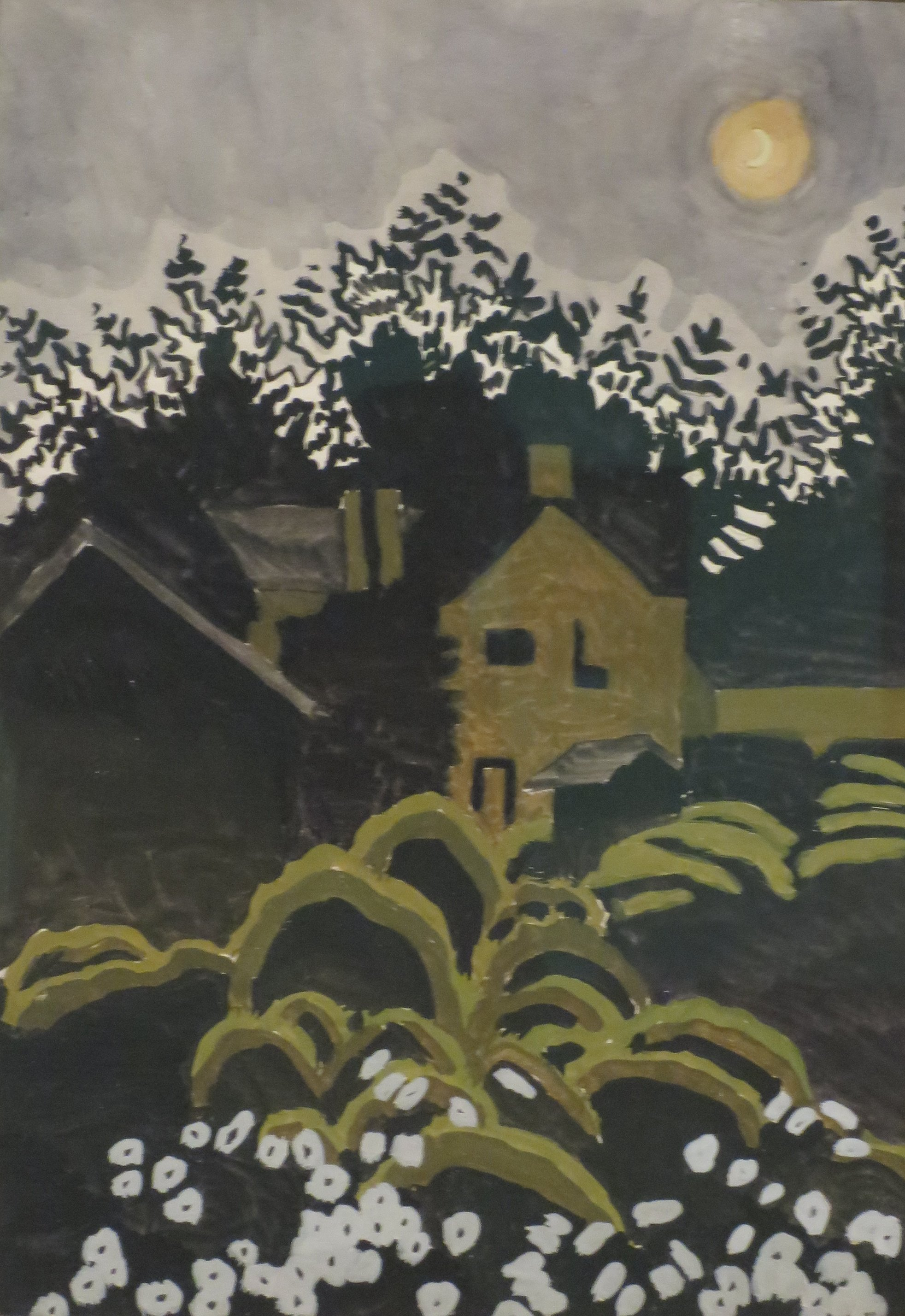
Charles Burchfield, Twilight Moon, 1916

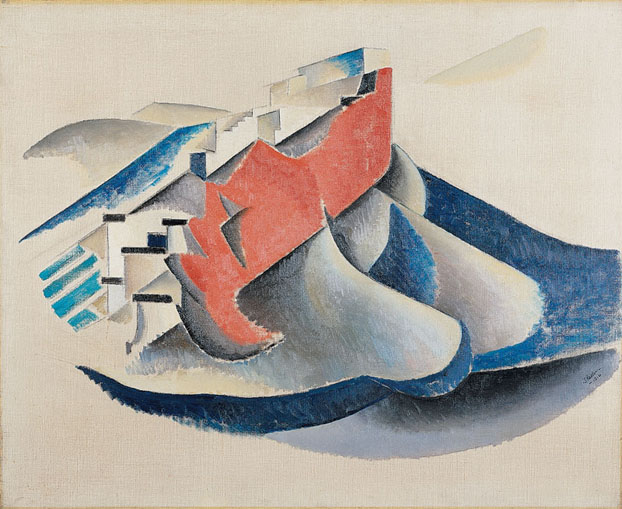
Charles Sheeler, Lhasa, 1916

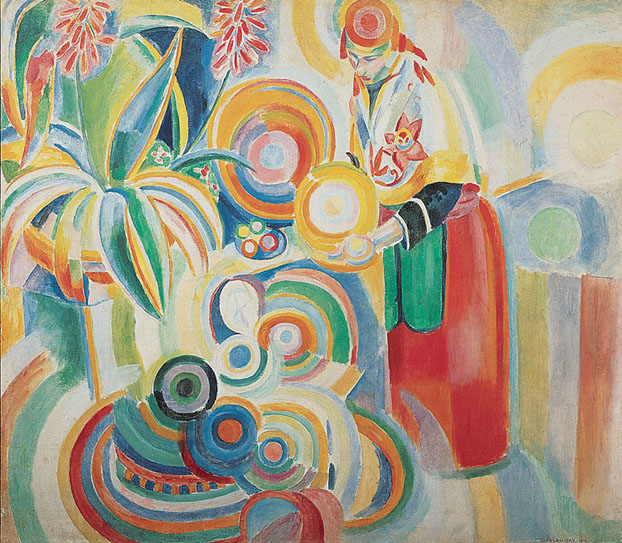
Robert Delaunay, Portuguese Woman, Oil on canvas, 1916

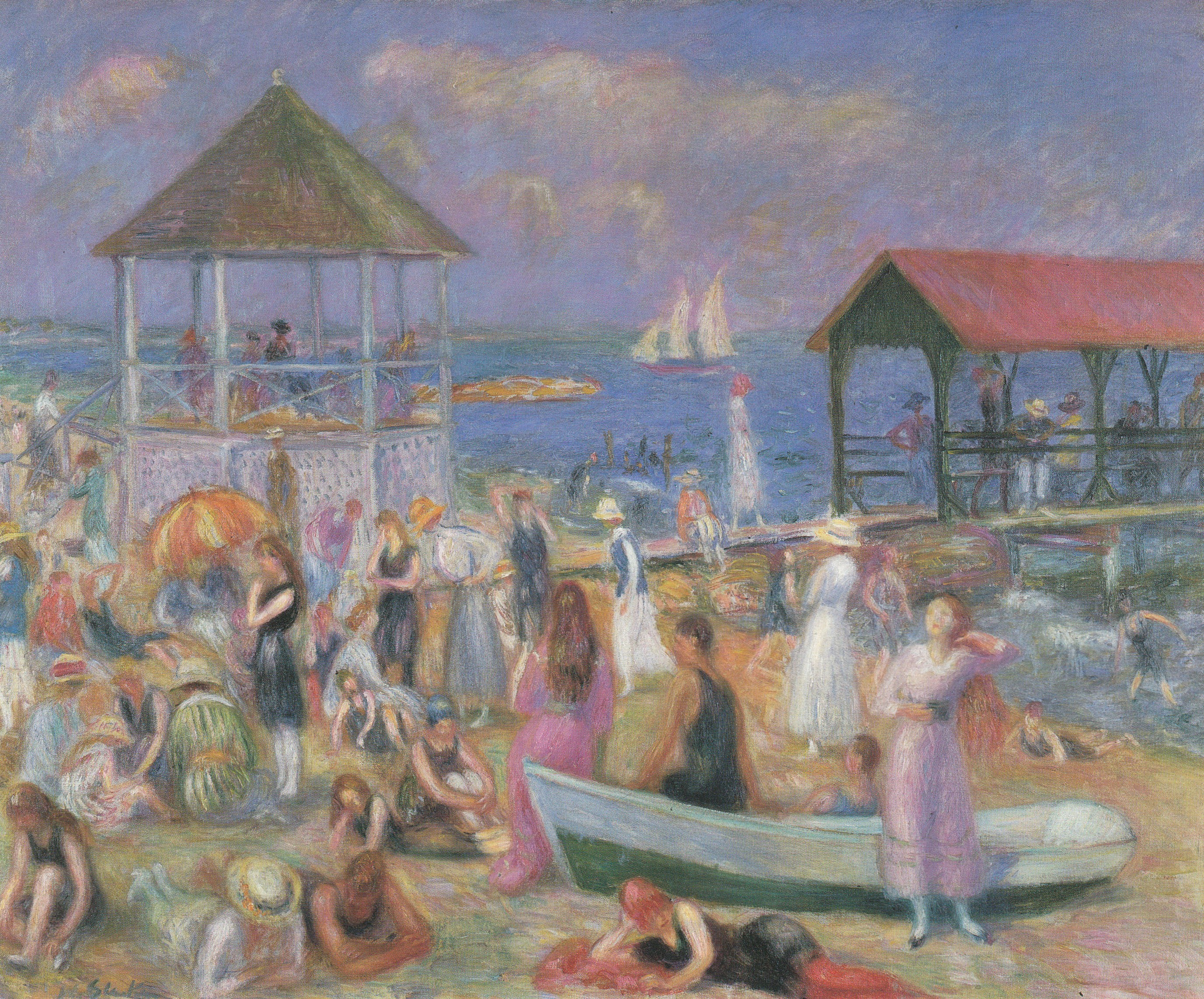
William Glackens, Beach Scene, New London, 1918

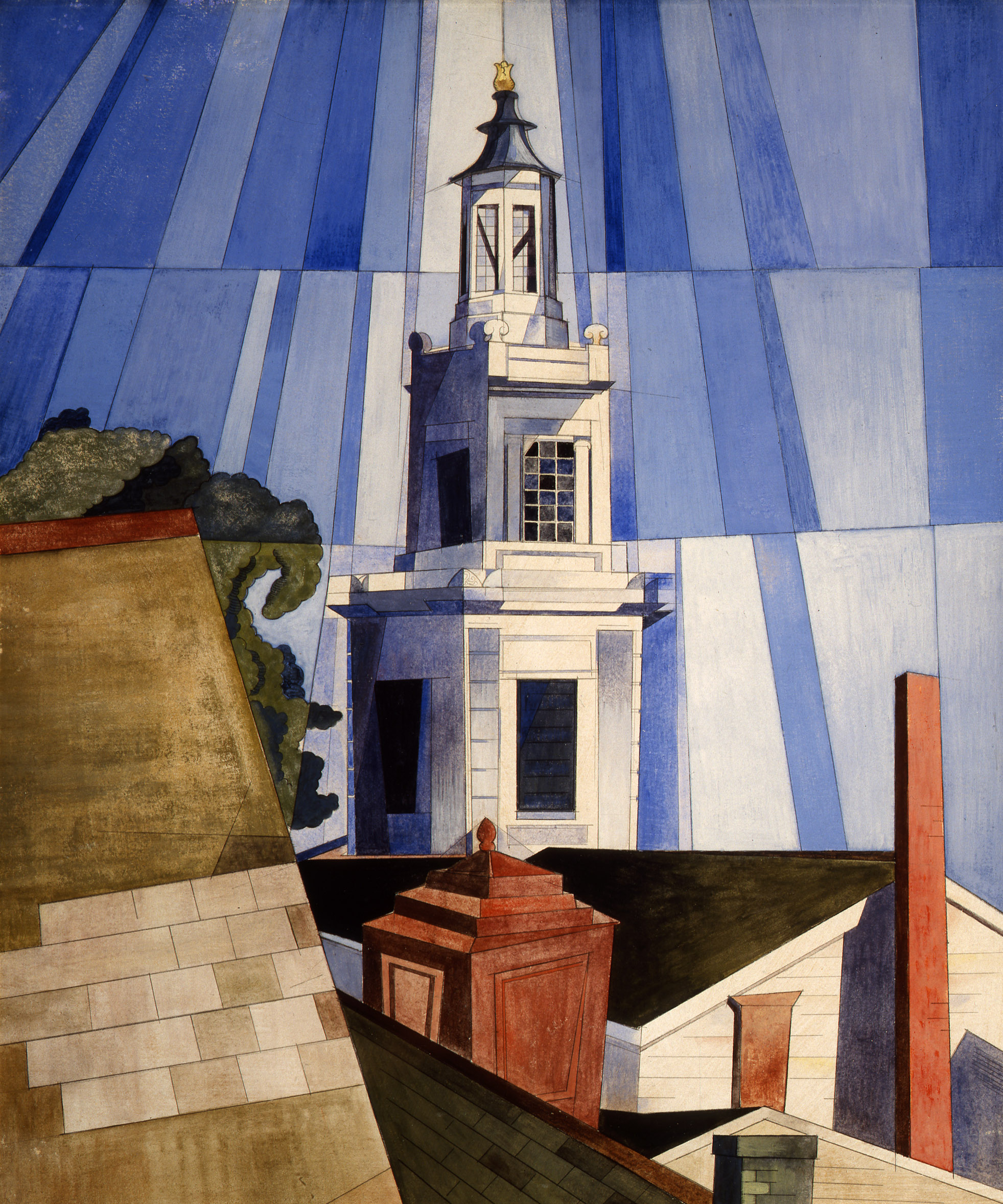
Charles Demuth, The Tower, 1920
