= Queen Brooks =

American artist

- Born: April 23, 1943 (age 82); Columbus, Ohio
- Education: MFA, Ohio State University
- Occupation: Artist
- Website: http://www.bluehavenartstudio.com

Queen Brooks (born 1943) is an artist from Columbus, Ohio, best known for her distinctive, brightly painted, wood-burned pieces. Brooks has been described by The Columbus Dispatch as "one of Ohio’s best-known African-American artists," and by Columbus Museum of Art director Nannette Maciejunes as "a leading arts elder in our community." Brooks is an influential mentor of many younger artists, including psycheñwelic painter April Sunami. She is a past winner of the Lila Wallace, Reader's Digest International Artist Award, which gave her a fellowship in Abidjan, the capital of the West African country of Côte d'Ivoire.

In 2012, the organization known as The HistoryMakers conducted an oral interview with Queen Brooks for its African-American video oral history collection, which aims to cultivate "a more inclusive record of American history."

== Early life and education ==
Brooks was nurtured as an artist by a tight-knit group of influential black Columbus-area artists, which included Bill Agnew, nationally famed woodcarver Elijah Pierce, outsider artist "Grandpa Smoky" Brown, MacArthur Fellow Aminah Robinson, and Brooks' own personal mentors, photographer Kojo Kamau, and mixed-media artist Barbara Chavous. She began her arts career teaching arts and crafts at the J. Ashburn Jr. Youth Center in 1980, which is where she first encountered pyrography (wood-burning). After receiving her MFA at Ohio State University, she completed a residency in Abidjan, Ivory Coast, West Africa as the recipient of the 1993 Lila Wallace, Reader’s Digest International Artist Award.

== Appointments ==
- Otterbein University - Adjunct Professor, Art, 1995 - 2002
- Ohio Dominican University - Adjunct Professor, Art, 2002 - 2006
- Greater Columbus Arts Council - Art in the House, Lead Artist, 2008–present

== Exhibitions and collections ==
Brooks is represented in the permanent collections of the Columbus Museum of Art, the William H. Thomas Gallery, the Martin de Porres Center, the National Afro-American Museum and Cultural Center in Wilberforce, Ohio, and Ohio Dominican and Otterbein Universities, and the King Arts Complex, as well as in private collections across the United States and in the Ivory Coast. Her work is currently on display at the Southern Ohio Museum.

She has also created painted and sculptural wood works for public spaces, including the portal entrance for the Kwanzaa Playground in Columbus, Ohio, and a mural for Krumm Park, also in Columbus.

In 2020, the Southern Ohio Museum featured the work of Queen Brooks in an exhibit.

== Awards and honors ==
- Lila Wallace, Reader’s Digest International Artist Award - 1993
- Ohioana Career Award, 2008
- South Side Settlement Arts Freedom Award, 2004
- Arts Midwest National Endowment of the Arts Award, 1994
- Excellence in the Arts Award, The Ohio State University

== Public artwork ==
Brooks' public artworks include the portal entrance for the Kwanzaa Playground, Ohio’s first Afrocentric playground, and murals at Columbus’ Krumm park area, Indianola K-8 School, and Ohio Wesleyan University's Ross Art Museum.

== Bibliography ==
Brooks' work has been featured in Essence Magazine and the International Review of African American Art.
