= April Sunami =

Mixed-media artist

- Detail of "Lady of Chaos" by April Sunami
- Born: April Joyce Sturkey; 1980 (age 45–46); Cincinnati, Ohio
- Occupation: Artist
- Spouse: Christopher Sunami
- Children: River Sunami and Ella Sunami
- Website: http://aprilsunami.com

April Sunami is a mixed-media artist based in Columbus, Ohio. Her work has been exhibited in museums, galleries and private collections across the United States, and in both Ghana and Cuba, and is represented in the permanent collections of the Southern Ohio Museum in Portsmouth, Ohio and the National Afro-American Museum and Cultural Center in Wilberforce, Ohio. She was described in the Columbus Dispatch by Columbus Museum of Art director Nannette Maciejunes as an heir to the legacy of (fellow female, African-American Columbus-area artist) Aminah Robinson (a winner of the MacArthur "genius" grant). She has served in leadership roles in local arts organizations Creative Arts of Women, Mother Artists at Work and Creative Women of Color (formerly Sistahs of the Arts), served as assistant director at the William H. Thomas Gallery and was the first board president of All People Arts Incorporated. She is currently featured as part of the "Columbus Makes Art / Art Makes Columbus" tourism campaign as a face of Columbus art. She has a BA in Art History from Ohio State University and a MA in Art History from Ohio University. She is one of the current artists-in-residence at the Blockfort arts building. Her mentors in the world of art include Talle Bamazi, Stephanie Rond, Queen Brooks, and Bettye Stull.

== Exhibitions ==
- Art of Soul (2019) and Black Heritage Through Visual Rhythms (2016), National Afro-American Museum.
- Waiting for Transcendence: Work by April Sunami (2017), Southern Ohio Museum.
- Art 360: Art Hatching Across Ohio, Columbus Museum of Art, Southern Ohio Museum, Massillon Museum, Parkersburg Art Center, and the Springfield Art Museum.

== Awards and honors ==
In 2020, Urban One radio honored Sunami as a Black History Month "Future History Maker". In 2019, Sunami's work was chosen to represent Columbus at the National Theatre in Columbus's sister city Accra, Ghana; she was one of the Columbus representatives to the 13th Annual Havana Biennial in Cuba (2019) through the ConnectArt project; and she was selected as one of the Top 10 Local Artists of the year by Columbus Underground. In 2018, she was a participant in Columbus' celebration of the 100th anniversary of the Harlem Renaissance. She was the winner of the 2017 GCAC Award, Professional Division at the Ohio State Fair. In 2016 she was selected for the Greater Columbus Arts Council Community Arts Partnership Award Purchase, and was a Shadowbox Gallery of Echoes Featured Artist. She received a Jurors Choice award as a participant in the Greater Columbus Arts Council and Capital Crossroads Special Improvement District CAP-UP Artist Grant in 2012.

== Relatives in the arts ==
Sunami's father-in-law John Sunami has several public art installations in the Columbus area, and was an early pioneer of digital art. His father, Soichi Sunami, was a noted Pictorialist photographer best known for his extended artistic collaboration with modern dance icon Martha Graham. Sunami, John and Soichi were all featured in a 2018 family exhibition at the Cultural Arts Center, that also included art from sister-in-law Jennifer Sunami, son River Sunami, and music composed by husband, Christopher Sunami. Sunami's maternal cousin Yusef Afoxè was also a professional artist.

== Psycheñwelic art ==
Sunami is best known for having popularized what she calls "psycheñwelic" art (from the Greek root psyche, meaning mind or soul, as combined with the Swahili word nywele meaning hair), a locally-influential art movement centered in Columbus, Ohio. The style is a synthesis of abstraction and realism, where a more realist face, typically of an African or an African-American woman, is combined with a more abstract depiction of hair or clothing as a way of adding a psychological dimension to the portrait. Sunami has been working almost exclusively in this style since 2006, and in more recent years, has enhanced the abstract portions of her work with mixed-media collages that tie her work back to the earlier Columbus-centered, female African-American mixed-media art movement sparked by Robinson. A large number of other local artists have also produced occasional work in this same style.

== Collaborations ==
Sunami has contributed to collaborative works by Creative Arts of Women and Mother Artists at Work, and did individual collaborations with visual artists Stephanie Rond, Queen Brooks and Lisa McLymont; and poets Naki Akrobettoe, Caroline Bennett, Dionne Custer Edwards, Barbara Fant and Katerina Harris, among others.

== Bibliography ==
Sunami's work is featured in the book Are You Entertained? Black Popular Culture in the 21st Century (Duke University Press), edited by Simone Drake, Ph.D. and Dwan Henderson, Ph.D.

== Other media ==
Sunami's work was the subject of an episode of WOSU-TV's anthology series about the local arts scene, Broad & High, the subject of a segment on WTTE's Good Day, Columbus, and featured in a video segment for the "Columbus Makes Art" campaign, as well as in a documentary feature about Columbus artists traveling to Cuba, Columbus in Cuba.
