= Kojo Kamau =

American photographer and gallerist (1939–2016)

Kojo Kamau (October 11, 1939––December 12, 2016) was an American photographer and gallerist based in Columbus, Ohio.

== Early life and education ==
Kojo Kamau was born Robert Jones Jr. on October 11, 1939, on the East Side of Columbus, Ohio. He bought his first camera, a Kodak Brownie, as an elementary student for $5.

He was a schoolmate of Aminah Robinson at East High School, where he took all kinds of art classes, and graduated in 1957. After high school, he enrolled at the Columbus College of Art & Design and worked odd jobs. He later became a photographer for The Ohio Sentinel, a Columbus Black newspaper, before joining the U.S. Air Force in 1960 and editing the base newspaper in Myrtle Beach, South Carolina. In the south, he faced rampant discrimination and didn't photograph his time there so as not to remember it.

== Career ==
In 1964, Kamau returned to Columbus, where he married and changed his name to Kojo Kamau. Kojo meant "unconquerable" in Yoruba and Kamau, "quiet one." He divorced in 1970. As a medical photographer at the Ohio State University, he met his second wife, Mary Ann Williams (1945–1991). Williams was a professor of theater and communication in the Black studies department and the host of the WOSU TV show Afromation where he would take the publicity photos for guests. He worked as a medical photographer until 1994.

In 1978, the couple travelled to Senegal, Ivory Coast, Ethiopia, Tanzania and Egypt to better understand African art, culture and history. When they returned, they helped secure funds for Aminah's Africa trip by founding a nonprofit entity, ACE—Art for Community Expression, in 1979. The nonprofit gallery was located downtown Columbus around the corner from Elijah Pierce's barbershop. Inspired by the Harlem Renaissance, the nonprofit's dual mission was to send artists to Africa and provide opportunities for Black Americans to exhibit their work in months other than February. The five-members of the nonprofit's board included Columbus' first Black arts patron Ursel White Lewis.

In 1986, the gallery moved to The Short North neighborhood, where the gallery saw more visitors than its previous location due to the neighborhood's Gallery Hop. Through the gallery space, Kamau worked with Black artists in the area giving many a start at a time when most exhibition spaces didn't show Black art. Artists who showed at the gallery included Elijah Pierce, Aminah Robinson, Queen Brooks, Smoky Brown, Pheoris West, and Richard Duarte Brown. As the gallery became a respected destination for Black art in Columbus, it collaborated with various institutions such as Ohio State's Frank W. Hale Black Cultural Center, the King Arts Complex, and the Fort Hayes Metropolitan Education Center. It also expanded its offerings with community programming and the outdoor art festival Afro Fair.

As a photographer, Kamau photographed celebrities including Muhammad Ali, President Barack Obama, Miles Davis, and Maya Angelou as well as Columbus street scenes, shops and people. His documentary photography sought to change the misperceptions of Black Americans, and show the human side of people and positive documentation of their lifestyle. His work has been exhibited at the Columbus Museum of Art, the Chicago Center of Science and Industry, and the Art Institute of Pittsburgh.

== Later career and death ==
In 1997, Kamau began to focus more on his role as an instructor at Columbus State Community College. He closed ACE's Short North location in 1999 after its 20-year anniversary but continued to occasionally put on exhibitions around the city.

Kamau died at the age of 77 on December 12, 2016.
