= Paul-Henri Bourguignon =

American artist

Paul-Henri Bourguignon (1906–1988), was an American visual artist, art critic, writer and journalist; he was born in Brussels, Belgium. He studied painting at the Académie des Beaux-Arts and art history at the Université libre de Bruxelles in Brussels. Between the two world wars Bourguignon traveled through Spain, Corsica, France, Italy, Bosnia, North Africa, and the Caribbean.

In 1944 Bourguignon began working as an art critic for Le Phare, Brussels' daily newspaper, and in 1947 convinced the paper to send him to Haiti, where he wrote travel articles for the paper and photographed the Haitian people. In May 1947, he met his future wife, the anthropologist Erika Eichhorn, who was doing anthropological fieldwork in Haiti.

In July 1948 Bourguignon left Haiti for Peru, but returned to the US in 1950 to marry Erika, in Columbus, Ohio, where she had accepted a teaching position in the Ohio State University's Anthropology Department. During the next 38 years Bourguignon painted and sketched full time, primarily remembered scenes from his previous world travels.

Most of Bourguignon's art consists of people, both individuals and groups, and landscapes; later in life however he began producing abstractions. Although he worked in gouache in the 1950s, he later turned to acrylics. In addition to paintings Bourguignon produced pencil, pastel, and ink drawings. His work has been described as timeless, passionate and visionary.

Since the 1960s Bourguignon's art has been exhibited in more than 40 solo shows, primarily in Ohio but also in New York City, Sedona, Arizona, and Santa Fe, New Mexico. His art was used to illustrate Edward Lense's Via Crucis: The Way of the Cross.

Bourguignon died September 22, 1988, in Columbus, Ohio. After his death, the Ohio History Center in Columbus recreated his art studio, which is on display as a permanent exhibit.

== Public collections ==
Bourguignon's work is in the permanent collections of the Museum of Ixelles in Brussels, Nelson-Atkins Museum of Art, Richard Ross Museum of Art, Artist Archives of the Western Reserve, Columbus Museum of Art, Southern Ohio Museum, Ohio History Connection, and Springfield Museum of Art. His photographs are archived at Ohio State University.

== Bibliography ==
- Abatemarco, Michael. 2014. "Faces in the Crowd, Painter Paul-Henri Bourguignon." Pasatiempo Santa Fe New Mexican. Santa Fe, New Mexico. February 14, 2014. pp. 36–37.
- Abatemarco, Michael. 2015. "Paul-Henri Bourguignon’s Paintings of Haiti, 1947." Pasatiempo, Santa Fe New Mexican. Santa Fe, New Mexico. March 6, 2015. https://www.santafenewmexican.com/pasatiempo/art/exhibitionism/paul-henri-bourguignons-paintings-of-haiti-1947/article_56f660a9-c1fb-5577-9bf2-4cb7579e0d64.html
- Adams, Henry. 2016. Paul-Henri Bourguignon Citizen of the World. Artist Archives of the Western Reserve. pp. 4–5. https://docs.google.com/document/d/1W30u8xaoMMqcQV83Bov1hxpS_g2_I_9tq1209Dy4iuA/edit
- Artists Archives of the Western Reserve. 2013. Paul-Henri Bourguignon (1906–1988). https://www.artistsarchives.org/archived_artist/paul-henri-bourguignon/
- Blough, Denise. 2014. "Columbus Museum of Art to Show Work of Late Columbus Artist Paul-Henri Bourguignon." The Lantern. Columbus, Ohio. October 16, 2014. https://www.thelantern.com/2014/10/columbus-museum-of-art-to-show-work-of-late-columbus-artist-paul-henri-bourguignon/
- Bourguignon, Erika. 2004. “Haiti and the Art of Paul-Henri Bourguignon.” Research in African Literatures 35.2 (2004) 173–188. [HAPB] <https://www.jstor.org/stable/3821352?read-now=1&seq=1#page_scan_tab_contents>.
- Bourguignon, Erika. 2013. “The Painter's Eye: Paul-Henri Bourguignon's Haitian Photographs.” American Imago Volume 70, Number 3, Fall 2013, pp. 357–383. https://www.jstor.org/stable/26305056?read-now=1&seq=2#page_scan_tab_contents
- Columbus Museum of Art. 2014. Paul-Henri Bourguignon: A 50th Anniversary Retrospective. ISBN 978-0-918881-50-2. https://docs.google.com/document/d/1H-9MePL03kQ5FY_twGwVM6MdMNRaRIEqJSGW6UCftAg/edit
- Columbus Museum of Art. N.D. https://5095.sydneyplus.com/final/Portal/Default.aspx?lang=en-US&g_AAAK=final+%7CObject+%7CPortalAggr+%3d+'bourguignon'&d=d
- Dayan, Joan. 1996. "The Craft of Memory: Bourguignon's Haitian Paintings." Exhibition Catalog: Paul-Henri Bourguignon 1906–1988 The Haitian Works. Columbus, Ohio: Gallery V, 1996, pp 2–4.
- Dupont, David. 2011. "Perrysburg Gallery Exhibits Work of Master Painter of the 20th Century." Sentinel-Tribune. Perrysburg, Ohio. September 11, 2011. https://www.sent-trib.com/2011/09/08/perrysburg-gallery-exhibits-work-of-master-painter-of-20th-century/
- Eisele Gallery, Cincinnati. N.D. "Wonderheads: Featuring Paul-Henri Bourguignon’s Expressionist Painting." https://www.eiselefineart.com/single-post/wonderheads
- Erika Eichhorn Bourguignon obituary. 2015. The Columbus Dispatch. February 21, 2015. https://www.legacy.com/us/obituaries/dispatch/name/erika-bourguignon-obituary?id=16454819&fhid=8693
- Fischer, Jim. 2016. "Art Preview: Off the Walls: Paul-Henri Bourguignon." Columbus Monthly, Columbus, Ohio. March 23, 2016. https://www.columbusmonthly.com/story/entertainment/arts/2016/03/23/art-preview-off-walls-paul/23006650007/
- Hall, Jacqueline. 1987. "Visual Arts. Review of Gallery 200 Bourguignon Exhibition." Columbus Dispatch. April 12, 1987. p. 10H.
- Hall, Jacqueline. 1989. "Visual Arts. Review of Gallery V Bourguignon Exhibition." Columbus Dispatch. October 22, 1989. p. 8G.
- Lense, Edward. 2013. Via Crucis: The Way of the Cross. Igloo Press (reprinted in 2023 as The Bronze Serpent: Liturgical Poems 1975–2014. Eugene, OR: Resource Publications).
- Mayr, Bill. 2005. "Spartan Drawings Depict Struggles of Jesus." Columbus Dispatch. May 19, 2005.
- Meyer, Deborah Raenette. 1998. "Sketches Offer Different Views of Bible Scenes." The Chapel Hill News. September 27, 1998. p. B5.
- Musée d'ixelles - Museum van Elsene. 2020. "AT HOME - Intérieurs de la collection du Musée d’Ixelles: Sympathique cette vue depuis le balcon de Paul-Henri Bourguignon." https://www.facebook.com/museedixelles/photos/a.376685475704170/3021938104512214/?type=3&paipv=0&eav=AfZK_Yqj1YZ3kbah_DpvYF6mJJMYBcE-HZ7tI3-GdYz7MJWR6cCZmUIaXdKfU9-gWis&_rdr
- The Nelson Atkins Museum. Works of Paul-Henri Bourguignon. https://art.nelson-atkins.org/people/14833/paulhenri-bourguignon;jsessionid=48AF107D24D6212D1623AD4991EA8004/objects#info
- The Ohio History Connection. https://museumcollections.ohiohistory.org/collection/museum/search?search=%22Paul-Henri+Bourguignon%22
- The Ohio State University. Paul-Henri Bourguignon literary collection, 1911–1989. https://library.ohio-state.edu/record=5130290
- Paolucci, Christina. 2019. "Ohio History Center - Paul Bourguignon Exhibit." Vimeo video. https://vimeo.com/355383337
- Peggy R. McConnell Arts Center of Worthington. https://app.arts-people.com/index.php?show=209429
- Ross Art Museum. Paul-Henri Bourguignon. https://sites.owu.edu/rossart/artist-detail/?dataId=403675
- The Southern Ohio Museum of Art. https://somacc.com/new-acquisitions/ pp. 10–11
- Springfield Museum of Art. 2023. "Seeing Is Enough: Paul-Henri Bourguignon April 7–July 16, 2023". https://www.springfieldart.net/?exhibition=paul-henri-bourguignon
- Springfield Museum of Art. https://www.springfieldart.net/?collection=the-permanent-collection
- Staff Writer. 2012. "Gallery Features Bourguignon Work." Red Rock News. Sedona, Arizona. December 7, 2012. p. 9.
- Staff Writer. 2017. "ALT’s Retrospective Examines Painter Bourguignon’s Work." Red Rock News. Sedona, Arizona. January 6, 2017. p. 3.
- Staff writer. 2018. "Modern Master Painter Paul-Henri Bourguignon." Sophisticated Living, Cincinnati, Ohio. March/April 2018. pp. 68–69. https://issuu.com/sophisticatedliving/docs/mar-apr-2018_d2a3ba6e6d6f30
- Tonguette, Peter. 2016. "Visual Arts: Art Access exhibit by Paul-Henri Bourguignon." Columbus Dispatch. Columbus, Ohio. April 24, 2016. https://www.dispatch.com/story/entertainment/2016/04/22/visual-arts-art-access-exhibit/23539584007/
- Yates, Christopher. 2009. "Bourguignon Savored. Retrospective Highlights Diverse Career of Belgian Native." Columbus Dispatch. February 22, 2009. p. E7.
