= William H. Thomas Gallery =

Art gallery in Ohio

Coordinates: 39°57′38.0″N 82°57′56.7″W

- Established: 1989
- Location: 1270 Bryden Road, Columbus, Ohio
- Director: Chief Baba Shongo Obadina
- Website: www.galleryinthehood.com

The William H. Thomas Gallery, affectionately known as "The Gallery in the Hood," is one of the oldest, continuously operated, black-owned, independent art galleries in the United States. It is located in Olde Towne East, Columbus, Ohio. It was opened to the public in 1989 by curator and owner Chief Baba Shango Obadina, and has since played an influential role in promoting the work and careers of local black artists, including: Queen Brooks, "Grandpa Smoky" Brown, Antoinette Savage, April Sunami, Barbara Chavous, and MacArthur Fellowship recipient Aminah Robinson.

== History ==
Obadina was an early pioneer in the world of independent black art (as were several of his former Columbus East High School classmates, including Detroit's George N'Namdi). He purchased the house that would become the gallery from the Columbus, Ohio land bank for only $200, in 1976. Over the next thirteen years, he laboriously restored it, adding unique features, such as a floor made from inlaid discs of wood and a hand-carved wooden door.

== Programs ==
The gallery regularly organizes art events every three months, showcasing works by local black artists, including the poet Is Said. It also frequently conducts "think tanks" discussing philosophical subjects. Its overseeing body, the Urban Cultural Arts Foundation (UCAF), played a key role in informally naming the adjacent area as the "African Village," in honor of its ties to the local African-American heritage. For more than ten years, UCAF has been organizing a yearly local arts celebration known as the African Village Festival. Additionally, UCAF was instrumental in the creation of the Kwanzaa Playground, an African-American art-inspired playground, in the nearby English Park. The park features playground equipment and other elements designed by local African-American artists and promotes positive images of African-American culture.

== Flag Wars ==
In 2003, Obadina and the gallery were prominently featured as major subjects in Flag Wars, a critically acclaimed but controversial documentary around the subject of gentrification. The film detailed cultural conflicts between longtime black residents of Columbus' Olde Towne East neighborhood and younger, wealthier, gay, white, new residents moving into the area. The movie's name refers to the rainbow flags displayed by the new residents, which stand in stark contrast to the handmade wooden sign placed over the entrance of the gallery. The documentary was nominated for an Emmy Award and won a Peabody Award.
