= Talle Bamazi =

Togolese curator and painter

- Born: Bamazi Talle; Togo, West Africa
- Education: Art Students League of New York, New York Academy of Art
- Occupations: Artist, curator, gallery owner
- Website: http://www.talleart.com

Talle Bamazi is a Togolese-born Kabye painter, curator, and gallery owner. He is based in Columbus, Ohio.

== Early life and education ==
Born in northern Togo (West Africa), into the Kabye ethnic group. Bamazi began his artistic career as an apprentice to his uncle, a traditional Togolese artist. Although he studied architecture in Lomé, he rapidly returned to painting, and developed his own distinctive style bridging traditional African and contemporary modern art.

After moving to the United States, he studied at the Art Students League of New York, and earned a MFA degree at the New York Academy of Art. He is currently the lead artist-in-residence at the King Arts Complex, where his monumental series of life-sized portraits of Columbus-area black artists, formerly featured at the Columbus Museum of Art, now hangs in the historic Pythian theater.

== KIACA Gallery ==
From 2004 until 2011, Bamazi operated a gallery called KIACA (Kabiye Impact Contemporary African Art), which was the only black-owned gallery in Columbus' noted arts' district, the Short North, and one of the few black-owned galleries in the city. KIACA served as an influential talent incubator for many Columbus-area African and African-American artists, including psycheñwelic painter April Sunami.

== Exhibitions ==
Bamazi's work has been featured at the Columbus Museum of Art, where he had a solo show in 2008 and an upcoming solo show ("The Flying Calabash Man") in 2020, as well as at the National Afro-American Museum and Cultural Center in Wilberforce, Ohio. His other solo exhibitions include the Columbus City Hall, Welancora, Karma and Brecht Forum galleries in New York and the Goethe Institut in Lomé. His work has also appeared in group shows at the Museum of Science and Industry in Chicago, the African American Museum in Hempstead, NY, and the Museum of Contemporary African Diasporan Arts in Brooklyn, NY.

== Awards and honors ==
Bamazi was recognized, alongside MacArthur "Genius" grant recipient Aminah Robinson, at the 27th Annual King Arts Center Gala in 2014.

== Media ==
Bamazi has frequently appeared on "Good News," Time Warner Cable Channel 23, and hosted his own television show around the arts during his youth in Lomé. His work has been featured in Art in America, Monarch Magazine, C-BUS Magazine, Valentine New York Art Magazine, and Diva Magazine, among others.
