= Standard Building =

Standard Building may refer to:

- Standard Building (Cleveland, Ohio)
- Standard Building (Columbus, Ohio)
