= Bettye Stull =

American arts curator

Bettye J. Stull
- Born: June 13, 1931 (age 95); Wheeling, West Virginia
- Occupation: Arts Curator
- Spouse: Robert J. Stull

Bettye J. Stull (June 13, 1931 in Wheeling, West Virginia) is a curator, arts educator, and collector and is a figure in the Columbus Black arts community, known for her mentorship of young Black women, including artist April Sunami and activist Jessica Byrd. In her work as staff curator at the King Arts Complex, she was the founding director of the Elijah Pierce Gallery. Her other African and African-American art shows have appeared at the Ohio Craft Museum, the McCoy Community Arts Center, the Cultural Arts Center and several other area venues. She served as an art advisor for the Long Street Bridge “Culture Wall,” a collaboration between the City of Columbus, the Mid-Ohio Regional Planning Commission, and the Ohio Department of Transportation, which created an arts-based solution to the problem of urban neighborhoods divided by freeways.

== Personal life ==
Stull was married to ceramicist Robert J. Stull, a professor of art at Ohio State University, from 1971 until his death in 1994. He was Dean of the Fine Arts department from 1979 to 1984.

== Awards and honors ==
- Greater Columbus Arts Council Award, 2011
- Award for Outstanding Achievement, the Ohio Craft Museum, 2012
- Lincoln Theatre Walk of Fame Inductee, 2019
