= Killing of Korryn Gaines =

Shooting in 2016 in Maryland, US

- Date: August 1, 2016
- Time: 3:00 p.m.
- Location: Carriage Hill Circle, Randallstown, Maryland, U.S.
- Cause: Shot by police
- Filmed by: Korryn Gaines (filmed portions of the standoff)
- Participants: Korryn Gaines, Kodi Gaines, Baltimore County Police Department members
- Deaths: Korryn Gaines (age 23)
- Injuries: Kodi (Gaines' son, age 5)
- Publication bans: Upon police request, Facebook deactivated Gaines' social media accounts (Facebook and Instagram) featuring live coverage of the standoff

The killing of Korryn Gaines occurred on August 1, 2016, in Randallstown, Maryland, near Baltimore, resulting in the death of Gaines, a 23-year-old woman, and the shooting of her son, who survived. According to the Baltimore County Police Department, officers sought to serve Gaines a warrant in relation to an earlier traffic violation. She had refused to vacate her vehicle or show her driver's license, and resisted arrest. Immediately after the first officer entered her home to serve the warrant, Gaines pointed a shotgun at him, prompting him to withdraw without shots being fired.

The Baltimore County SWAT team responded and a standoff began. She recorded and live streamed to Facebook where Gaines's friends told her to "continue on". She is seen to have told her son that "the police are coming to kill us". Upon her refusal to let them in, police got a key from the rental office but found the chain lock blocked their entry. An officer then kicked in the door. Police say Gaines pointed a shotgun at an officer, telling him to leave.

Upon police request, Facebook deactivated Gaines' Facebook and Instagram accounts, leading to criticism of the company's involvement in the incident. In 2018, a jury awarded the Gaines family $38 million in damages after finding that the first shot, fired by Royce Ruby and killing Gaines, was not reasonable, and thus violated their civil rights. That verdict was overturned in February 2019 by Judge Mickey Norman, who ruled that physical evidence suggests Gaines was raising her weapon when shot, thus posing a threat to Ruby and his team. Judge Norman, himself a former law enforcement officer, described Ruby's actions as "objectively reasonable" and ruled all officers involved had qualified immunity.

In July 2020, an appeal court reinstated the $38 million award with the explanation that it is the responsibility for the jury to decide questions of fact, not for the court to do so, concluding the judge had abused his discretion in that regard.

== Background ==
Korryn Gaines was a 23-year-old woman from Randallstown, Maryland, and was employed as a hairstylist. Her father, Ryan Gaines, had worked as a police dispatcher, according to depositions of Gaines' family in a 2012 civil suit. Her mother, Rhonda Dormeus, aged 49, is a registered nurse. She also has a 32-year-old sister and 26-year-old brother. Gaines was wanted on a bench warrant for failing to appear in court on charges related to previous cases of disorderly conduct and resisting arrest following a March 10 traffic stop and other traffic offenses, according to Baltimore County Police. Gaines was pulled over by a police officer for driving without a license plate.

After the incident, police reported that Gaines, though not actively affiliated with any specific anti-government group, identified and behaved as a 'free person' who does not recognize governmental authority. Gaines' use of an irregular, homemade "license plate", her telling the officers that she didn't "follow [their] laws" and the content of her social media posts indicate that she may have identified with the sovereign citizen movement. Sovereign citizen ideology is rooted in a pseudolegal conspiracy theory implying that government authority is illegitimate and that laws no longer apply to people once they have proclaimed themselves free of legal constraints.

=== March incident ===
According to police reports, Gaines was stopped for a traffic violation for having a piece of cardboard with writing on it in place of a license plate. The cardboard plate read "Any government official who compromises this pursuit of happiness and right to travel, will be held criminally responsible and fined, as this is a natural right and freedom." Gaines was pulled over for invalid license plates which she contends was valid under constitutional law. She did not have the car registered in the state of Maryland and a citation from the police officers was in order along with repossession of the vehicle. Upon being stopped, the police removed her keys from the vehicle as to stop her from driving off since the officer deemed her non-compliant with police.

The officers gave her the citation, ordering her to exit her vehicle, and informing her that they would be impounding it as it had no license and was no longer registered in the state of Maryland. A subsequent verbal conflict ensued. She replied to the officer, "You're not going to kidnap me." After the officers ordered her to get out of the vehicle, she told them, "You will have to kill me". At that point, she began holding her child.

== Shooting ==
Baltimore County Police Department officers arrived at Gaines' apartment at Carriage Hill Apartments on Sulky Court to serve her a warrant. Gaines was in the apartment with her five-year-old son, and, according to a police statement, armed herself with a Mossberg shotgun; a standoff between Gaines and police ensued. Police say that after several hours of standoff, Gaines threatened officers with a shotgun. One police officer fired a shot and Gaines fired back with buckshot. Officers responded with three shots, hitting Gaines. Gaines' five-year-old son, Kodi, was shot by police in the crossfire. Kodi's arm was struck by bullets and suffered an elbow injury and bullet fragments in his face. Gaines' boyfriend, Kareem Kiean Courtney (age 39), who was living with Gaines, was able to leave the apartment with Gaines' 1-year-old daughter, upon which he was briefly detained by police before being released.

The shooting was not recorded as officers were not wearing police bodycams; initially police reported they were unsure if that was the case, as their bodycam program had recently begun. However, portions of the standoff were recorded by Gaines and posted to social media. Police later stated that while there is no police footage of inside the apartment, some officers assigned to support roles outside were wearing body cameras.

=== Filming and social media ===
According to news reports, during the standoff with police, Gaines posted videos on Facebook and Instagram during the incident. The videos appear to show Gaines talking with police in the doorway to her apartment and to her son. In one clip, she asks her son what the police are trying to do. He replies "They trying to kill us." She then asks: "Do you want to go out there?" "No," the boy replies. She then asks "What'd you wanna do?" He appears confused and stays silent. Gaines says, "there is no wrong answer."

Police contacted Facebook via the company's "law enforcement portal" and requested the account be taken offline. According to a police spokesperson, the account had been suspended but not deleted, adding that the video would be used as evidence. This was the first instance where Baltimore County police requested Facebook to deactivate an account in such a situation.

In a statement following the incident, Baltimore County police reported that they asked Facebook to suspend Gaines' Facebook and Instagram accounts during the standoff because of comments made by others to her video posts encouraging her to not comply with orders from officers. Facebook complied with the emergency request.

In early November, a new video was released from the incident showing Gaines talking into the camera, expressing her exhaustion but concurrent refusal to back down from arriving officers: "I'm at peace. I'm in my home. I ain't trying to hurt nobody. ... They been quiet a while so they plotting to come in here and disturb the peace. ... I am not a criminal."

== Reactions ==
The death of Gaines, who was of African-American descent, received international news coverage. Activists have called for protests under the "Say Her Name" banner, noting that black women who are killed by police receive less media attention than black males. Gaines was the ninth black woman to be killed by police in the United States in 2016 and although in nearly every incident questions were raised as to whether or not the women attacked police, only Gaines' death received nationwide coverage.

Police said there had been multiple threats to police following the incident, and called for patience while the incident was investigated.

Because of threats against officers, police opted not to identify the officer who killed Gaines during the incident, though the department's standard procedure is to release the names of officers involved in shootings about 48 hours after such an incident. In a county report, the officer is described as a 46-year-old white male.

Some conservative outlets criticized the extensive coverage of the event, and the allegations of racial disparity as a contributing factor, stating that the police officers involved behaved rationally and did not provoke the shootout, and that Gaines unlawfully threatened police.

In the days following the shooting, local artists in Baltimore gathered to sell works to raise money for Gaines' family. A candlelit vigil was held at sunset at the entrance of Baltimore City College, the school where Gaines graduated from in 2010. In a number of cities across the United States, upon the urging of Black Feminist Future, a number of altars were laid to honor Gaines' and other black women killed by police. A number of the altars used the phrase "defend black womanhood" alongside other slogans.

The NAACP Legal Defense and Educational Fund requested information and records from Baltimore County police including body camera footage, policies on the execution of arrest warrants and a copy of the department's agreement with the county police union. Police stated there is no body camera footage from inside the apartment, but that some officers assigned to support roles outside were wearing cameras. Following the publicized NAACP request, Baltimore County police published their response providing some of the requested details and documents but declined to release certain information, stating that the public would need to wait until after the investigation is complete.

=== Protests ===
According to some reports, Gaines' death was initially protested by supporters of the Black Lives Matter movement. In the days following the incident, a protest was held in New York City, approximately 100 people attended, with the involvement of Black Youth Project 100 and a local group named "NYC Shut It Down" as part of a reoccurring protest event titled "People's Monday". The Phoenix chapter of the African National Women's Organization held a protest for Gaines and two others recently killed by police.

On August 13, 2016, in Portland, Oregon, protesters associated with Black Lives Matter and "Don't Shoot Portland" conducted a sit-in demonstration near Pioneer Courthouse Square and disrupted train services.

On August 15, 2016, a protest was held outside of the Maryland Fraternal Order of Police (FOP) conference at the Hyatt-Regency hotel. The protest was organized by Baltimore Bloc and the Black Youth Project 100. Twelve protesters were arrested for trespassing on private property. A local police union official was suspended for describing the protesters as "thugs" in a department-wide email.

A small protest occurred on August 27, 2016, at McKeldin Square in the Inner Harbor area of Baltimore; the group was led by the People's Power Assembly. The protest marched from McKeldin Square to the Randallstown police station.

=== Criticism of police ===
The American Civil Liberties Union (ACLU) of Maryland condemned the shooting, releasing a statement saying that the police "decided that they needed to use deadly force to execute that warrant, and needed to expose themselves to the known risk of deadly force being used on them, knowing that a five year old child might be in the line of fire" The National Organization for Women called for the United States Department of Justice to investigate Gaines' death, arguing that police were only at Gaines' home to serve warrants (not to arrest her) and were unable to deescalate the standoff. The National LGBTQ Task Force condemned the shooting, calling on state and federal authorities to investigate the incident.

Members of the Gaines family have voiced skepticism of the police account of the shooting. Civil rights activists cautioned against the authenticity of police reports released following such events. Gaines' mother was reportedly at the scene before the fatal shooting, however, she stated she was not allowed to intervene in the standoff, though she had pleaded to negotiate to end the confrontation. Gaines' family members reported being prevented by police from seeing Gaines' son when the boy was in the hospital.

Some news outlets have called into question why the Baltimore County Crisis Intervention Team was not deployed. Police say trained negotiators were involved but could not respond as to why the unit was not dispatched. Others suggest there are deficiencies in the way law enforcement attempt to deescalate interactions in minority communities, suggesting that Gaines' interactions with police may have been shaped by attitudes and beliefs regarding police and the justice system in urban black communities. According to Vox Media reports, legally, the police officers only must reasonably believe that their lives were in immediate danger, but are not required to ascertain whether the shooting victim actually posed a threat; however, activists maintain the police should have sought other means of resolving the conflict. Others have called for the hiring of more female police officers, arguing that policewomen would be less likely to use lethal force to resolve conflicts.

=== Criticism of Facebook ===
The incident is noted as being further evidence of a trend of live-streaming confrontations between citizens (specifically, Black Americans) and police in the United States. A senior ACLU attorney questioned the request by Baltimore County police to shut down Gaines' accounts, and Facebook's decision to comply, stating that Facebook must exercise caution when dealing with requests by police to censor content. Artist and journalist Ferrari Sheppard also criticized Facebook's involvement in the incident on Twitter, saying "Facebook helped Baltimore police kill #KorrynGaines in the dark." The corporate watchdog group SumOfUs criticised Facebook for setting a precedent of censorship by orders of police, stating that the move is a threat to civil liberties, owing to the current use of shareable video on social media as an instrument in exposing police violence in the United States.

Activists maintain that cutting off an account or otherwise controlling social media access becomes a strike against those fighting police abuse. The police may then have an advantage in controlling the narrative of the incident.

== Legal proceedings ==
On September 11, 2016, Gaines family lawyers filed a wrongful death lawsuit, alleging officers shot Gaines out of a loss of patience from the prolonged standoff. On September 21, Scott Shellenberger announced the officer who shot Gaines would not receive any charges. On October 11, Gaines family lawyers said that they had filed an amended lawsuit, naming Officers John Dowell and Allen Griffin as defendants; the Gaines family alleged they entered the apartment illegally, though this had previously been dismissed by Shellenberger and police officials.

In February 2018, a jury of 6 women awarded more than $37 million (more than $36 million by other accounts) in damages to the Gaines family after finding that the first shot, fired by Royce Ruby and killing Gaines, was not reasonable, and thus violated their civil rights. A statement from Baltimore County government attorney Mike Field said the county was disappointed with the verdict and reviewing its options, including an appeal. On March 19, 2018, Baltimore County filed an appeal. On February 14, 2019, Judge Mickey J. Norman dismissed the original complaint and consequently remitted the award of over $37 million. The family had stated they would file an appeal.

On Wednesday, July 1, 2020, after appealing, an appeals court reinstated the original $38 million verdict and ruled it was for the jury to decide questions of fact, not Judge Norman, concluding the judge had abused his discretion in that regard. It has been reported that a month and-a-half later, on August 15, 2020, Judge Norman had retired, however there are records of him presiding over matters within the jurisdiction of Baltimore County up until December 2021. In August 2021, Baltimore County reached a $3 million settlement with Gaines's estate and the other plaintiffs except for Kodi, whose claims remained in litigation. On remand, the circuit court left intact the jury's verdict in Kodi's favor on his battery claim but applied Maryland's statutory limit on local-government liability, reducing the recoverable damages on that claim to $400,000, plus $160,000 in post-judgment interest. Kodi continued to pursue a separate federal claim alleging a violation of his substantive due process rights under the Fourteenth Amendment. In June 2024, the Supreme Court of Maryland held that Corporal Ruby was entitled to qualified immunity on that claim because the constitutional right at issue was not clearly established at the time of the shooting.

== See also ==
- List of killings by law enforcement officers in the United States
