= Clarence Holbrook Carter =

American painter

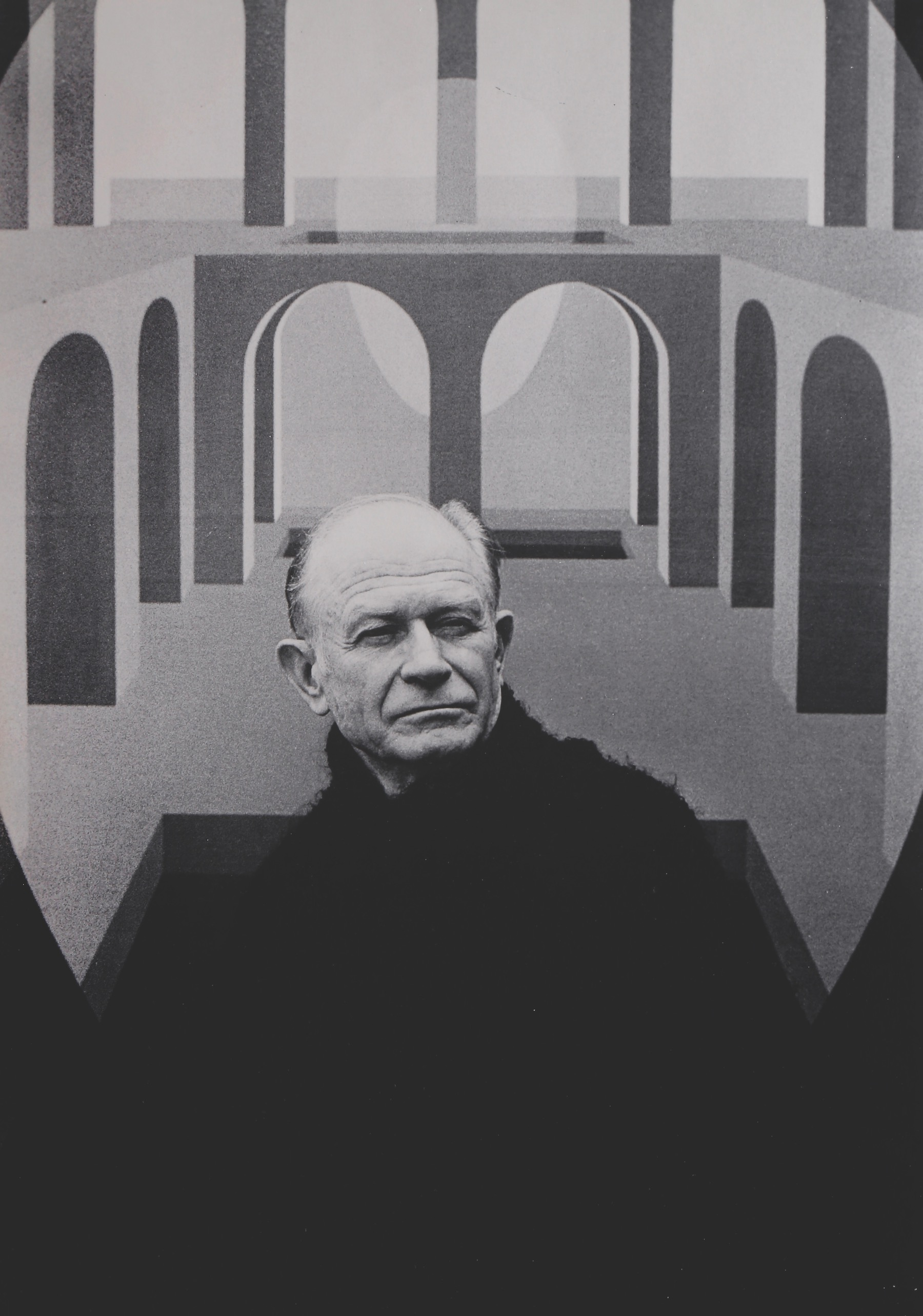
Clarence Holbrook Carter

Clarence Holbrook Carter (March 26, 1904, Portsmouth, Ohio – June 4, 2000, Holland Township, New Jersey), was an American artist who worked primarily in acrylic painting. He is considered one of Cleveland’s most renowned painters.

== Education ==
Carter studied at the Cleveland School of Art from 1923 to 1927 with painters like Henry Keller and Paul Travis. During his time in school, Carter won third prize in the “May Show” at the Cleveland Museum of Art for his work The Wanderer, earning him $25.

Upon Carter's graduation, William Millikin (then director of the Cleveland Museum of Art) arranged for him to study with modernist painter Hans Hofmann in Capri, Italy. During this time, Carter sent works back from Europe to be sold in the United States by Milliken, which allowed him to spend 1928 in places like France, Switzerland, and Northern Africa. When Carter returned to Cleveland, Millikin hired him to teach classes at the CMA while selling his own work.

== Career ==
At age 30, Carter painted two murals in Cleveland's Public Auditorium under the Public Works of Art Project (PWAP). He later produced two murals for post offices in Ravenna and Portsmouth, Ohio, later serving as the regional superintendent of the Northeast Ohio division of the painting projects arm of the Works Progress Administration (WPA). Throughout the 1930s and 1940s he was known for his paintings of rural America and the burden brought on by the Great Depression.

Carter was the first person in Ohio to have a painting bought by the Metropolitan Museum of Art. In 1935, he entered the painting The Creepers in the CMA’s “May Show” and won first prize; the Met bought the piece for $225. He won numerous prizes for his May Show submissions through the rest of the decade.

In 1938, Carter took a position at Pittsburgh's now Carnegie Mellon University until the mid-1940s. After World War II, he worked in advertising design for large corporations, landing his work in magazines like Vogue, Fortune, Time, Newsweek, Business Week, and US News & World Report. By this time, his paintings had been acquired by over 25 major museums, including the Museum of Modern Art in New York City, alongside his Met acquisition. One of his oil paintings, Summer Storm, was purchased by Barbara Hutton, Countess Haugwitz-Reventlow, in 1940. In 1949, he was elected to the National Academy of Design as an associate member, and became a full member in 1964.

Later in life, Carter made a major shift in his visual language. Turning away from representational painting and towards surrealism, his works became more abstract. He depicted mystical structural forms and egg motifs, imagery that would dominate his works until his death. Publications on Carter's life and work began in the 1970s, and around that same time he won the 1972 Cleveland Arts Prize for the Visual Arts. Posthumously, his aptitude for photography was discovered in a chest of reference shots for his paintings.

In 1974, a painting Carter had long deemed stolen was found in an attic by the owner of an antique shop in Jackson, Ohio. This was a work he had started during his time in Capri and later finished in Paris; he had loaned the piece to a man in Portsmouth for an exhibition in the 1930s, but it was never returned. The antique shop owner claimed to receive the painting as a gift from a friend after World War II, hanging it in his family home for some time before putting it into storage, when it was damaged by a house fire. Carter said, "I consider the painting was stolen and that it still belongs to me and should be returned."

== Collected works ==
11 books were released in the 1970s covering Carter's work, followed by 18 more in the 1980s. By 2004, his citations went up to 61. That same year, the Southern Ohio Museum put on the show Clarence Carter: The Unknown Snapshot Studies, which later moved to the Beck Center for the Arts in Lakewood, Ohio with support from the Cleveland Artists Foundation.

Currently, Carter's works can be found across the United States in the collections of the Whitney Museum of American Art; the Museum of Fine Arts, Boston; the Hirshhorn Museum and Sculpture Garden, Washington, D.C.; the James A. Michener Art Museum; the Cleveland Museum of Art; the Smithsonian American Art Museum, Washington, D.C.; the Carnegie Museum of Art, Pittsburgh, PA; the Yager Museum of Arts & Culture, Oneonta, NY; WOLFS Gallery in Beachwood, OH; the Toledo Museum of Art; and many more. At one point in time, he was represented in the Victoria & Albert Museum in London, and was featured in the Tate Gallery's exhibition American Painting: From the Eighteenth Century to Present Day in 1946.

Two of the most recent publications on his work are Bathsheba Monk's 2018 book Clarence H. Carter: Favorite Son and WOLFS Gallery's 2020 catalog titled Clarence Holbrook Carter: The Metamorphosis of an American Surrealist.

== See also ==
- Bodley Gallery
- Hans Hofmann
