= Black Feminist Future =

African American community initiative

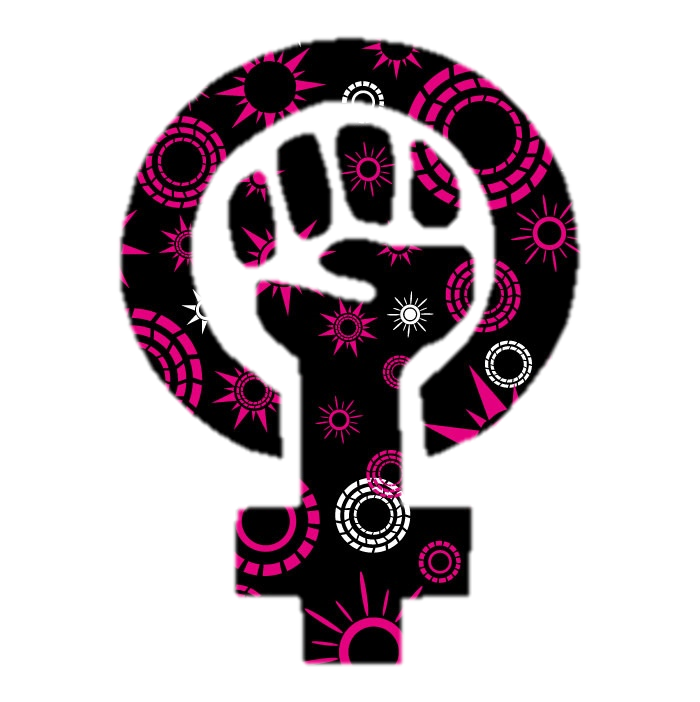
The feminism symbol

Black Feminist Future is a community initiative formed by members of the African American feminist community, with the aim of amplifying the power of black women and girls in community organizing and online engagement. The group was formed in reaction to the aftermath of a police shooting at Ferguson, Missouri in 2014.

In the aftermath of the shooting of Korryn Gaines, Black Feminist Future urged people across the country to build altars to honor black women.

== Initiatives ==
In wake of the 2016 United States Presidential election, the group launched an initiative named "Freedom Dreams: Black Feminist Visioning Our Political Future". The initiative includes making "visioning salons" to build vision and movement that centers the African-American feminist lives. The aim is affecting politics and revising the laws which are believed to incorporate racial discrimination.

Black Feminist Future is launching an organizing school in 2018 where they will provides resources for new Black feminists to analyze, train, and organize their own events and movements.

== People ==
Paris Hatcher is a founder of the movement.

Jessica Byrd, founder of Three Point Strategies, a firm dedicated to recruiting more people of color to run for public office, is a board member of Black Feminist Future.

== See also ==
- Black Twitter
- Black Lives Matter
- Say Her Name
