= Dr. Lewis M. Early Residence =

Historic house in Columbus, Ohio

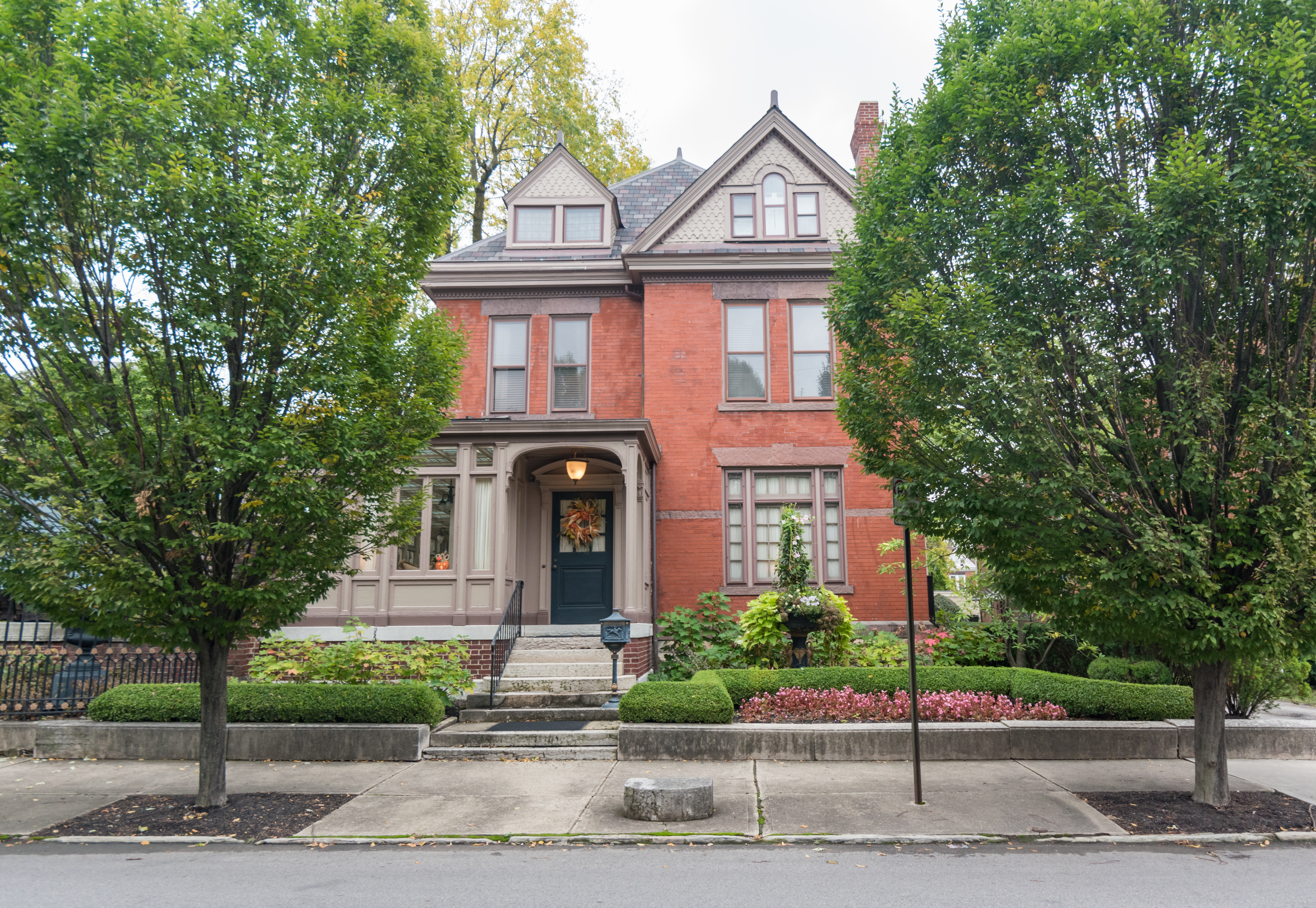
- Location: 108-110 N. 20th St. & 1047 E. Long St., Columbus, Ohio
- Coordinates: 39.967851°N 82.973409°W
- Built: 1892-1900
- Architectural style: Victorian

Columbus Register of Historic Properties
- Designated: January 23, 1984
- Reference no.: CR-24

The Dr. Lewis M. Early Residence is a historic property in the King-Lincoln Bronzeville neighborhood of Columbus, Ohio. The house and office were listed on the Columbus Register of Historic Properties in 1984.

The house, built in the late 19th century, is noted for its age and intricate architecture. It is considered historically significant for its place in Columbus's African American culture, as a social club, daycare center, bed-and-breakfast, and as the Garden Manor Cultural Arts Center.

== Attributes ==
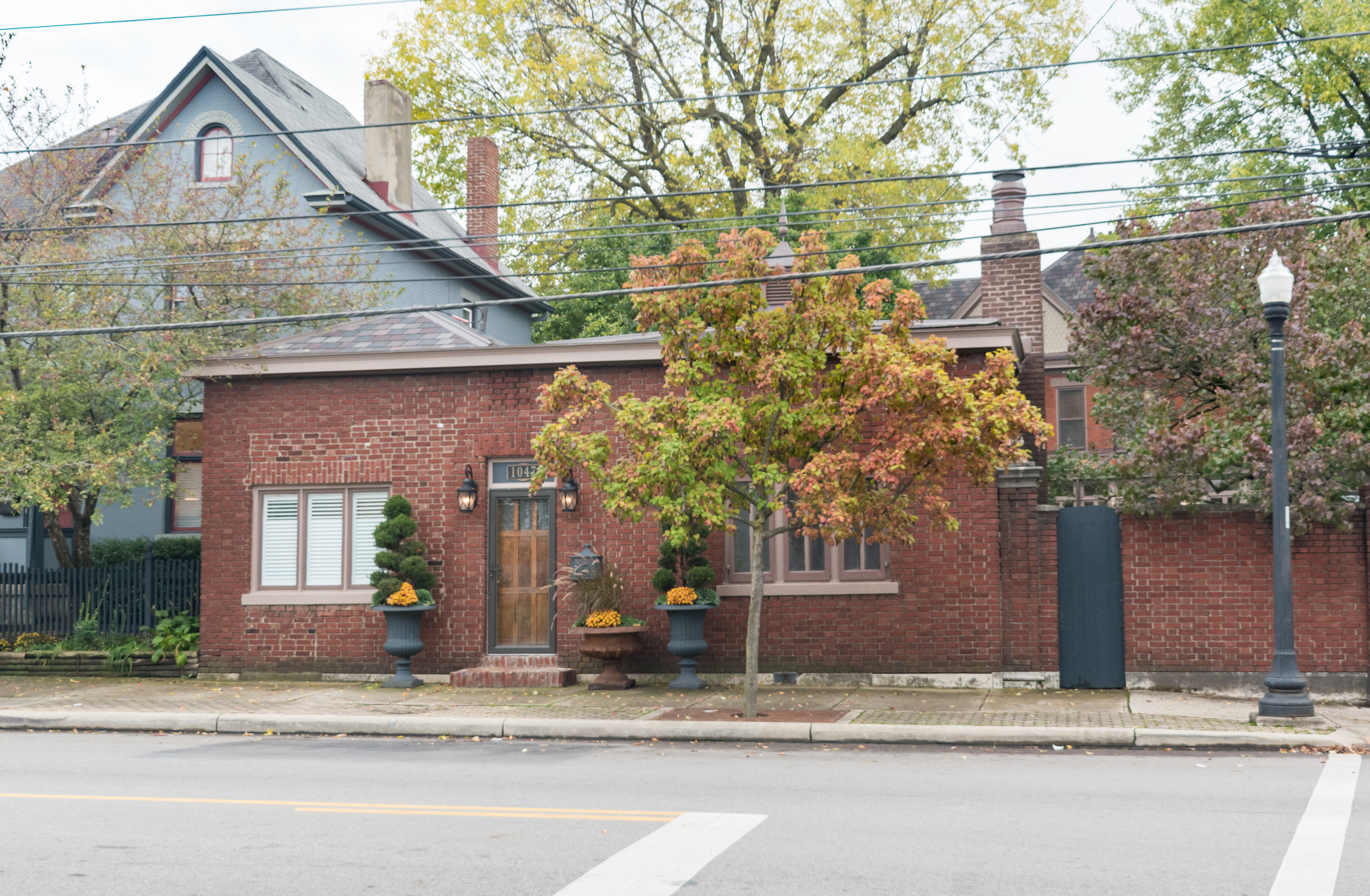
Office facing Long Street

The three-story house was designed in a Victorian style. It has grand and elaborate interiors: its first-story rooms have 10-foot ceilings and details including wood-paneled walls, French doors, plaster crown moldings, elaborate woodwork, stained-glass windows, and marble fireplace mantels. The interior spaces have been easily maintained and restored, as it is one of few Victorian houses in the city that has not been subdivided for offices or apartments.

The dining room utilizes mahogany wall panels and woodwork; its ceiling have original panels. The room's fireplace has a cast plaster mantel with a large oil painting inset into the wall. The house's grand room has cherry wainscoting and twin fireplaces with marble mantles. A side parlor room features floor-to-ceiling windows and skylights. Another notable feature of the building is its large bronze-railed staircase to the second floor with a 10-foot-tall stained-glass window at its landing.

The property's small brick building abutting Long Street was used as a medical office by Dr. Early.

== History ==
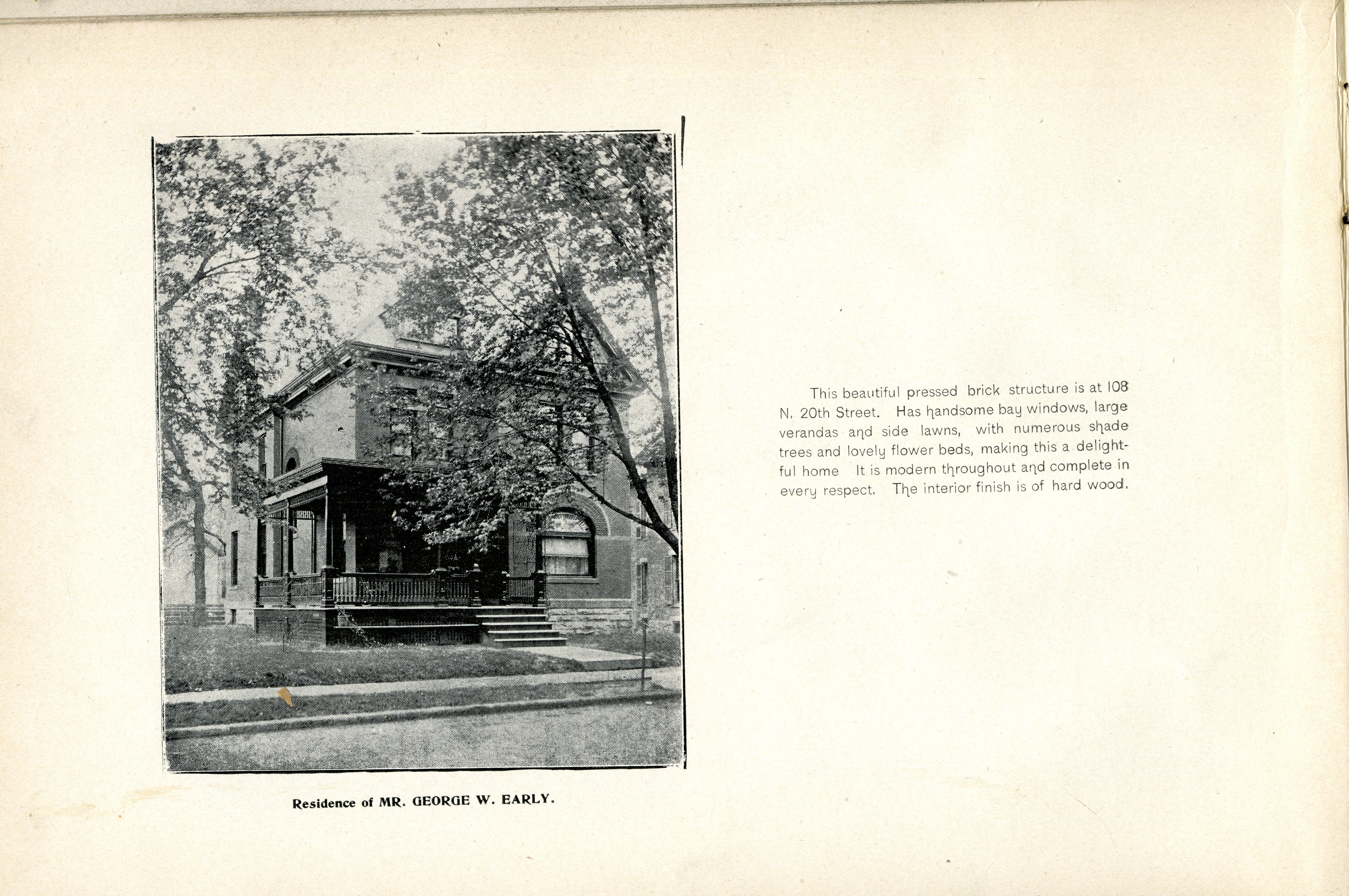
The house c. 1897

The house and office were built between 1892 and 1900. It was the home of Lewis M. Early, a pioneering doctor, inventor, and businessman working on the development of X-rays. He developed a process for recording X-rays on paper, and sat with patients for long X-ray exposures to prove their safety. Nevertheless, he died of cancer caused by the long and frequent X-ray exposures in 1912.

For the 50 years prior to its latest purchase, the house was not a private residence: it had served as social club for Black businessmen (from 1940-1943), a day-care center, and as an African-American cultural arts center. The house also served as a bed-and-breakfast for Black entertainers, as many Columbus hotels were not open to Blacks at the time. Duke Ellington, Count Basie, and Cab Calloway reportedly stayed there, among other prominent jazz musicians. The last owner of the house purchased it in 1974, held its ownership for 25 years, and restored much of its interior. She operated the house as a cultural arts center for the Black community, under its former name of the Garden Manor. In this role, the property housed two music schools, and the house was used for meetings, fashion shows, parties, weddings, and other events. Its current owners purchased the house in 2003, and have featured it in an Olde Towne East home and garden tour.

In 1986, the property was featured in a tourism campaign about African American culture in Ohio, the first major effort by a U.S. state government to promote minority culture. The Early residence was the first landmark featured in the history tour campaign; other central Ohio landmarks in the campaign included the Martin Luther King Cultural Arts Center, woodcarver Elijah Pierce's art gallery, the Ohio History Center, and the Benjamin Hanby House.
