= Jessica Byrd =

American feminist

Jessica Byrd is a Black feminist activist best known for her work as Chief of Staff to Georgia gubernatorial candidate Stacey Abrams, and her tenure as national training director at women's rights PAC EMILY's List. She currently works as a founding partner of Three Point Strategies, a political consulting firm aimed at the mission of getting more Black women into elected offices at all levels of government. She is an architect of the Movement for Black Lives Electoral Justice Project, and for its BREATHE Act bill aimed at redirecting federal funds away from the criminal justice system and towards community investment. In 2020, she led the planning team for an effort called the Black National Convention. She also sits on the boards for Black Feminist Future and SisterSong Women of Color Reproductive Justice Collective.

Byrd was born in Columbus, Ohio, where she was a mentee of arts educator Bettye Stull and a graduate of the Columbus Alternative High School. Byrd is queer.

== Awards and honors ==
- "Woman to Watch", Essence Magazine, 2015
- "12 New Faces of Black Leadership", Time Magazine
- "Time 100", Time Magazine, 2021
