= Peoples Power Assemblies =

Advocacy group in the United States

Peoples Power Assemblies (PPA) is an advocacy group in the United States that coordinates through local offices of the Workers World Party. The group advocates for jobs, healthcare, and educations and against police brutality, sexism, and anti-LGBT and ableist oppression.

The group has been involved in organising protests and demonstrations in the aftermath of the killing of Freddie Gray, Korryn Gaines, and the murder of George Floyd.

== Notable actions ==
Every year the NYC chapter of the PPA organizes a group to join the Disability Pride March and bring attention to police brutality disproportionately affecting the Black disabled community.

On June 4 2020, a Brooklyn EMT, Taylor Varela, was suspended for a twitter video of her encouraging a crowd of Black Lives Matter protestors over an ambulance loudspeaker. PPA created a change.org petition asking for Varela not to get fired or further reprimanded for her actions. The petition quickly garnered over 6,000 signatures. By the next week, Varela shared a post thanking her internet supporters and announcing that she did not get fired.
