= Naki Akarobettoe =

American poet (born 1984)

- Born: May 11, 1984 (age 42); Columbus, Ohio, U.S.
- Occupations: Poet, writer
- Website: nakispeaks.com

Naki Akarobettoe (born May 11, 1984), also known as Naki Akrobettoe, is an American poet who has worked with prominent singers and is cofounder of the organizations D.E.E.P. (Developing Empowering Enhancing Poets through Poetry) and Azucar Morena Ent.

== Biography ==
Naki Akarobettoe was born in Columbus, Ohio where she also grew up. She is the daughter of an American coalminer and of a granddaughter of some members of a family that were royals in part of what is now Ghana. She wrote her first poem when she was twelve years old, or in the 8th grade.

After of studying the work made for writers such as Phyllis Wheatley, Langston Hughes and Toi Derricotte, she attended The University of Toledo in 2002, where she met her mentor Rane Arroyo. Arroyo helped Akarobettoe to develop as a spoken word poet, and she began receiving requests to perform both on and off campus.

Since finishing college, Akarobettoe has lived in Toledo, Ohio.

In 2004, she co-founded D.E.E.P. (Developing Empowering Enhancing Poets through Poetry), a student organization for students who wanted to study poetry. She was also a writer clinician for organizations such as Covenant Youth Development and Youth Arts at Work. Akarobettoe has worked with artists Talib Kweli and Dwele. She also serves as co-host on the radio show "The Session" WXUT 88.3 FM. Akarobettoe also did work on the Tripple Croxx Entertainment production "The Signature: A Poetic Medley Show."

In May 2010, she released her first album "Penstrokes," with her first single entitled “Black Is". In 2010, Akarobettoe co-founded Azucar Morena Ent. Azucar Morena created the live poetry series “The E-Zone.” On May 5, 2011, she opened at a ceremony (that was organized by Stand Up For Ohio), performing the song "I Speak." Her most recent album was "D.O.P.E," released in late 2011.

She founded The Poetic J.A.M. event, called so because Poetry is my foundation and my avenue to do all the things I love to do. The Poetic J.A.M. have the aim of inspire people to do what it is they love to do and have great artist "doing what they love to do", including poets, singers, rappers, painters.

Akarobettoe has also worked as a medical writer in the Covenant Youth Development and Youth Arts in the Summer Work Program, with the goal of teaching students aged 12 to 18, "to use his voice" to improve the lives of individuals and the community. She is currently working on what will be a second album, "A Timeless Miracle: Improv Poems & Sound"
