= Standard Building (Columbus, Ohio) =

- U.S. National Register of Historic Places
- Columbus Register of Historic Properties
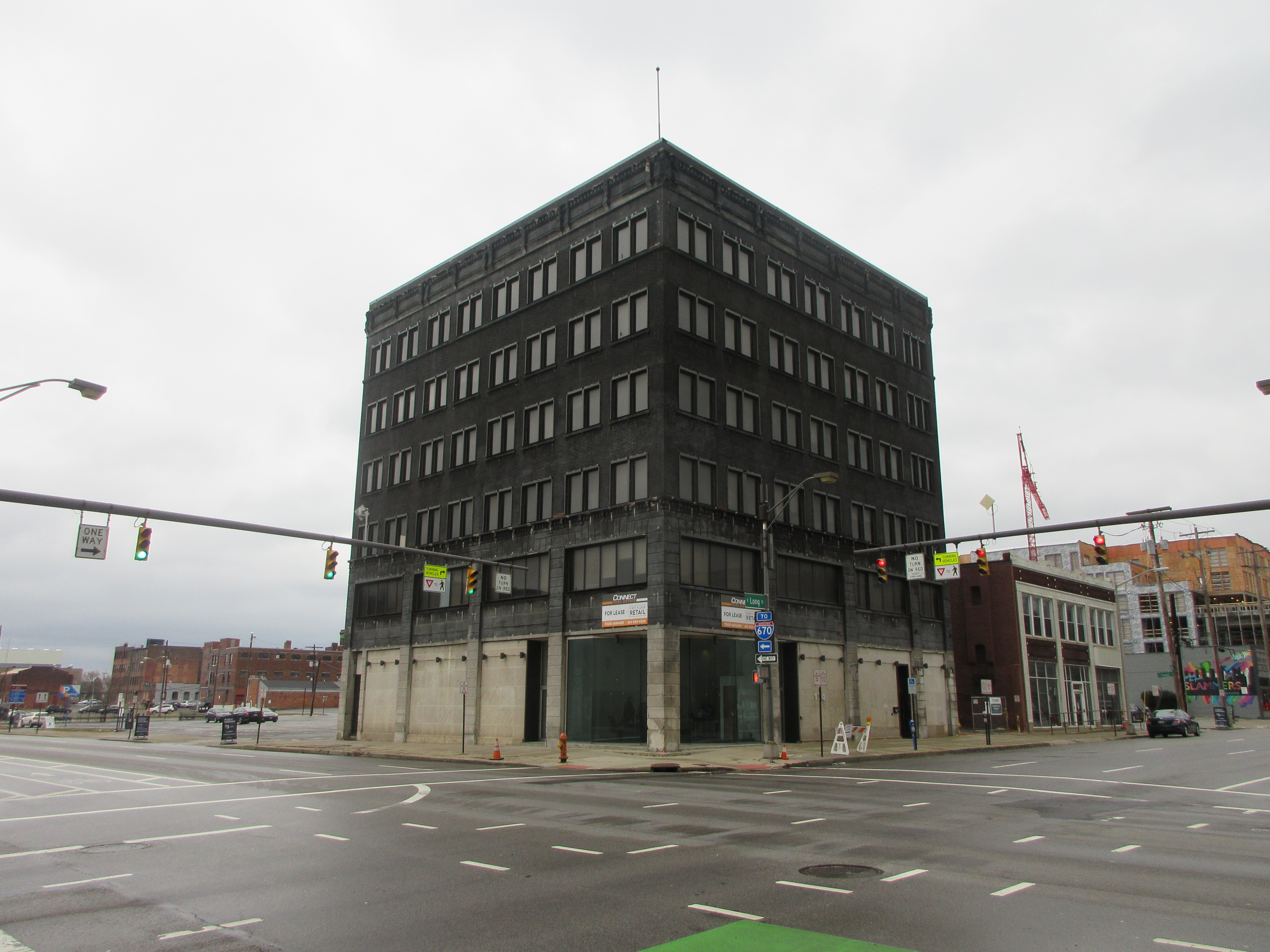
- Interactive map highlighting the building's location
- Location: 174 E. Long Street, Columbus, Ohio
- Coordinates: 39.96570°N 82.99656°W
- Built: 1912
- NRHP reference No.: 100004597
- CRHP No.: CR-76

Significant dates
- Added to NRHP: October 28, 2019
- Designated CRHP: March 18, 2019

The Standard Building, also known as the Blue Cross Building or as the Gugle Building, is a historic building in Downtown Columbus, Ohio. The building was built in 1912. Early tenants included the Lancaster Tire & Rubber Company, the Mutual Life Insurance Company, Irwin Manufacturing Company, and the Grid Graph Company. It also served as the regional headquarters of Standard Oil of Ohio, from 1917 to 1955, occupying its sixth (top) floor. It was listed on the National Register of Historic Places and the Columbus Register of Historic Properties in 2019. Also in 2019, the building owner Connect Real Estate began redeveloping the building into apartments, with 45 units, including 35 micro studio apartments and 10 one-bedroom units. Connect Real Estate sought the building's historic listings for tax credits in refurbishing it. The realty company owns the adjacent Winders Motor Sales Company building, which it has separately listed on historic registers to make restoration more affordable.

== See also ==
- National Register of Historic Places listings in Columbus, Ohio
