= Elijah Pierce Properties =

- U.S. National Register of Historic Places
- Residence (top) and barbershop (bottom), 1982
- Interactive map highlighting the buildings' locations
- Location: 534 E. Long St. and 142-44 N. Everett Alley, Columbus, Ohio
- Coordinates: 39.967076°N 82.986767°W (barbershop); 39.966896°N 82.986767°W (residence)
- Built: 1954 (barbershop) c. 1910 (residence)
- NRHP reference No.: 83001971
- Added to NRHP: August 3, 1983

The Elijah Pierce Properties were historic buildings in Downtown Columbus, Ohio. They were listed on the National Register of Historic Places in 1983.

The properties included the art gallery and barbershop of Elijah Pierce at 534 E. Long St. and his former residence, at 142-44 N. Everett Alley. Pierce lived in the residence from 1946 to 1970, the longest he ever lived in one location. The barbershop was the first and only shop Pierce built. He was the barber there from 1954 until his retirement in 1980.

In 1984, Pierce died and his wife sold the barbershop and art gallery building to Marvin Califf, co-owner of Columbus Time Recorder, a time clock business. He operated the business out of the space for about ten years.

In 1986, the property was featured in a tourism campaign about African American culture in Ohio, the first major effort by a U.S. state government to promote minority culture. Other central Ohio landmarks in the campaign included the Martin Luther King Cultural Arts Center, the Dr. Lewis M. Early Residence, the Ohio History Center, and the Benjamin Hanby House. In late 1986, Pierce's artworks were set to permanently move to the newly-opened King Arts Center.

Around 1995, Columbus State Community College began to buy up parcels for a new $7.5 million parking structure. By June 1995, he was the only hold-out of about 20 property owners, arguing that the school would not compensate him for his required move. The college was set to use eminent domain laws to force him from the property. The college eventually won the dispute, and the residence and barbershop were eventually demolished for the 1,000-car garage. A statue of Pierce stands near where the buildings had stood.

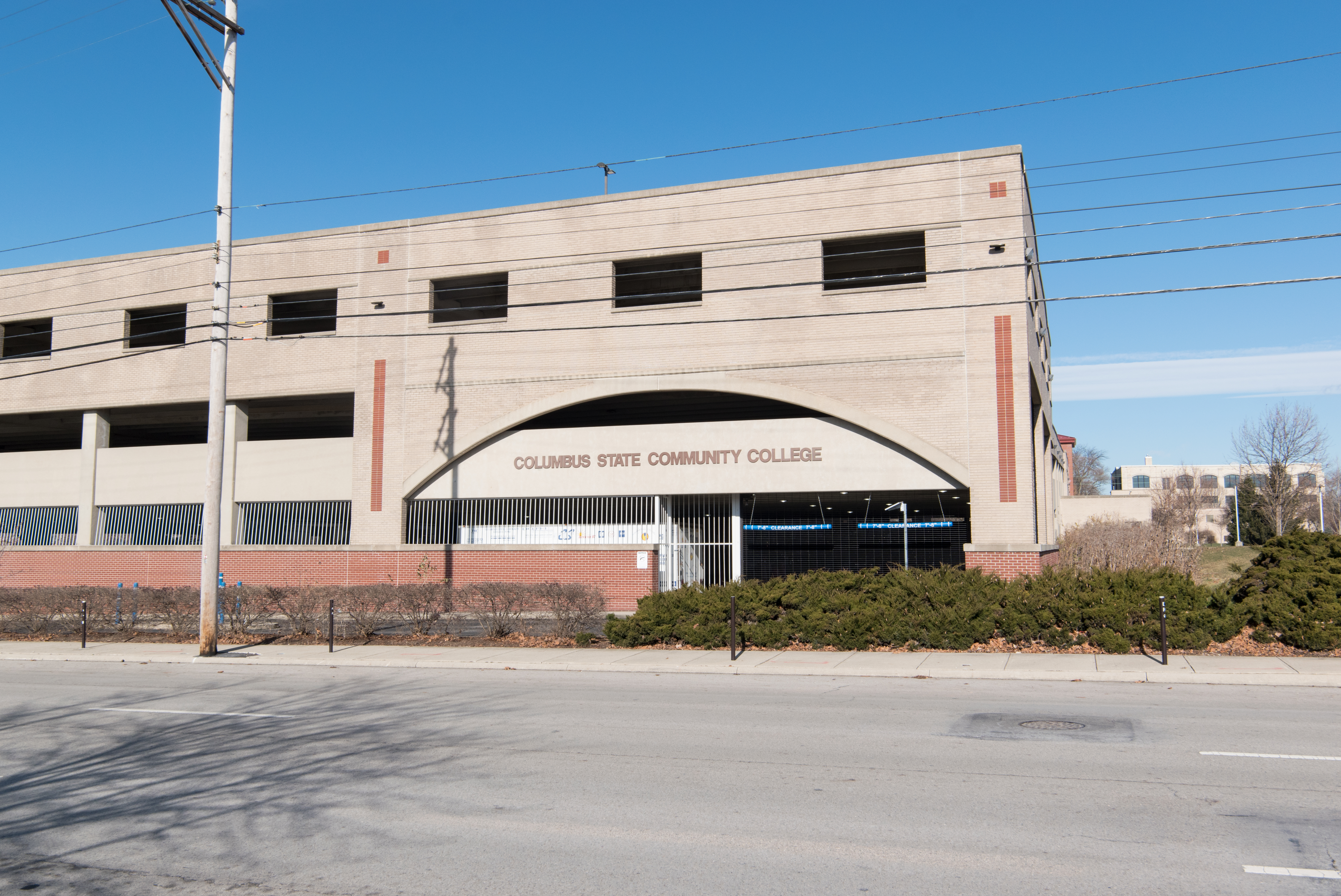
Present-day site

== See also ==
- National Register of Historic Places listings in Columbus, Ohio
