= Stephanie Rond =

American painter

- Born: 1973 (age 52–53); Columbus, Ohio
- Style: Street Art and Painting
- Website: stephanierond.com

Stephanie Rond (born 1973 in Columbus, Ohio) is an Irish-American street artist and painter living in Columbus, Ohio USA. She is the creator of S.Dot Gallery, a dollhouse art gallery featured in the award-winning documentary Tiny Out Loud. Her work explores the concepts of feminism and accessibility in art. Rond's work challenges the traditional gender roles associated with both indoor and outdoor space. The majority of her street art includes a character "ghost girl" who represents the ghost of humanity. Rond has dedicated her career to portraying women in a more honest fashion. Rond uses models to create her street art pieces using a hand-cut, multi-tier spray paint stenciling technique. It is Rond's intention to show women and girls as positive role models and active citizens, combating the typical objectification of women in advertising. Her street art has appeared throughout the world.

== Biography ==
Rond was born in Columbus, Ohio. She attended Fort Hayes Arts and Academic High School and received a Bachelor of Fine Arts from The Ohio State University. Rond began making street art in 2007 as a challenge to the male dominance of the art form. Rond is a feminist artist and is heavily involved in her community as an advocate for the arts. She currently resides in Columbus, Ohio where she works full-time as an artist, curator and community activist. She lives with her husband and their two cats, Delphi and Zee Bot.

== Career highlights ==
- An award-winning documentary was released in 2014 about Rond's work. The film, Tiny Out Loud, studies Rond's gender-gouging street art and dollhouse art galleries. The film challenges the concept of the accessibility of art.
- Rond had the distinguished honor of representing all of North America in "She's a Leader," a street art project created by the Women's Forum for the Economy and Society based in Paris, France.
- Rond is the single representative of street art in the midwest portion of the United States on the Google Art Institute: Street Art Project, a global collection of street art.
- Rond is the creator of "Sign Your Art", a first of its kind street art project which engaged artists and members of the public to create a unique art installation across the entire city of Columbus. Small art works were attached to city street signs. Each sign was photographed and each location was marked on a Google map with a pin, spelling out the word ART across the entire city of Columbus.
- The Columbus Dispatch and Columbus Alive newspapers recognized Rond's 97 piece solo show, titled Dangerous Impermanence, on their list of Best Art Exhibits of 2014.
- Rond has been featured on multiple segments of the PBS television show Broad & High.
- On May 9, 2015, Rond completed a street art "Community Intervention" piece on the front plaza of the Columbus Museum of Art. This piece included participation from the public as part of the CMA's "Connector Series". This piece is now part of the Columbus Museum of Art's permanent collection.
- In 2015, Rond's art was featured on the cover of the University of Chicago Press publication SIGNS: Journal of Women in Culture and Society.
- Rond is the founder of the website Women Street Artists, an online catalog of female street artists from around the world.
- Rond was a featured speaker at the Columbus Museum of Art's "Creativity Summit" in 2016
- In 2017, Rond's street art was featured in the book Women Street Artists: The Complete Guide.
- Rond's street art is featured in the 2018 publication titled The Brooklyn Coloring Book.
- Rond is a member of the global public arts initiative Micro Galleries and has participated in their creative interventions in Jakarta, Indonesia and Kathmandu, Nepal
- Rond participated in the Street Art Takeover of the Wein Museum in Vienna, Austria which opened July 5, 2019. She contributed as part of the SSOSVA collective
- Rond participated in "Columbus in Cuba | Cuba in Columbus", a multi-event, multi-venue group of exhibitions showcasing the work of artists from central Ohio and Cuba. Her work was shown alongside art from Cuban artists as part of a collateral Biennial exhibition in Matanzas, Cuba as well as an exhibition of Columbus artists and Cuban artists on display at art institutions, galleries, and public venues throughout Columbus, Ohio.
- Rond was commissioned to complete a permanent installation for the Columbus Museum of Art's "Ready Room" in 2023
- Rond was a featured in a touring group exhibition showing in multiple museums titled "Mirror! Mirror!" in 2023 and 2024. Museums included the Springfield Museum of Art the Allen County Museum and the University of Mary Washington Galleries
- Rond was the featured artist and on the cover of the September 2024 edition of the Columbus Monthly Magazine
- Rond was a featured artist alongside works from internationally recognized artists Cindy Sherman, Kiki Smith, Ana Mendieta in an exhibition in 2024 at the Dayton Art Institute titled "Riveting: Women Artists from the Sara M. and Michelle Vance Waddell Collection"
