= Pheoris West =

African American artist (1950–2021)

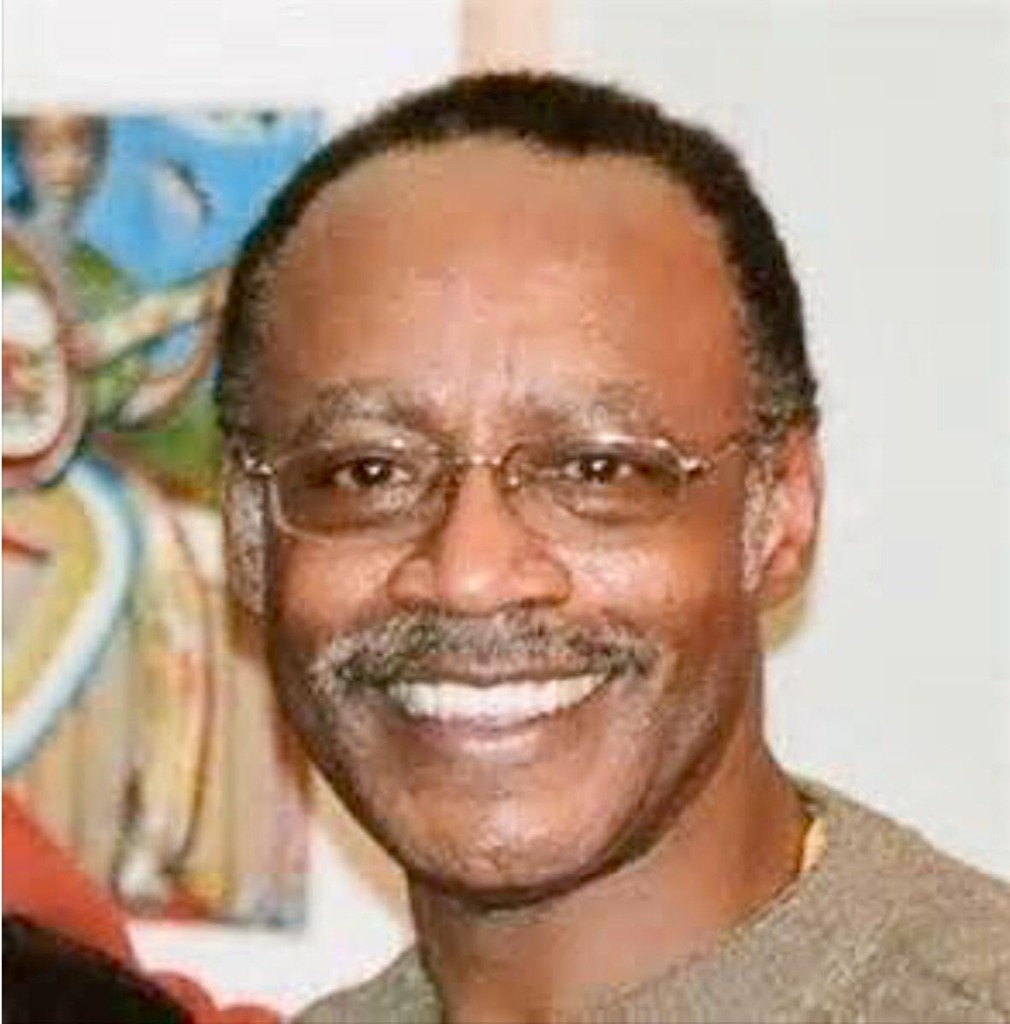
- Pheoris West
- Born: August 17, 1950; Albany, New York, U.S.
- Died: January 23, 2021 (aged 70)
- Education: Pennsylvania Academy of Fine Arts, Yale University M.F.A.
- Occupations: Artist; educator
- Years active: 1974–2021
- Spouses: Louise Calio (m. 1972; div. 1976); Michele Hoff (m. 1979)
- Children: three sons (triplets), one daughter
- Website: www.pheoriswest.com/index.html

Pheoris West (August 17, 1950 – January 23, 2021) was an African-American artist. He was an associate professor emeritus Ohio State University College of the Arts, where he joined the faculty in 1976.

== Early life ==
West was born in 1950 in Albany, New York. He studied at the Pennsylvania Academy of the Fine Arts, and earned a Master of Fine Arts degree from Yale University.

== Career ==
West's areas of expertise are painting and drawing, computer graphics, and design. Major influences on his early artistic development included the works of Romare Bearden, Henry Ossawa Tanner, and the 1970s Black arts collective AfriCOBRA.

"In my artwork I’m always striving for an ideal image, one that is based on balance and harmony. The choice for representing the human form is deliberate and extremely important. I celebrate humanity as godly images, the embodiment of the four essential elements of earth, air, fire, and water."

— Pheoris West, in St. James Guide to Black Artists (1997)

His art has been shown in various art displays since 1970. Examples of his work are held in the collections of the Studio Museum in Harlem, New York, the Museo Civico D’arts Contemporaneo Di Gibilina, Palermo, Italy, and the Contemporary Arts Center, Cincinnati. He took part in the national touring exhibition “To Conserve a Legacy: American Art from Historically Black Colleges and Universities". He was a curator for the 1999 "HOMAGE TO JAZZ" at the King Arts Complex in Columbus, Ohio. He has also served on the National Endowment of the Arts Expansion Arts Panel, the International Juror National Exhibition of Zimbabwe, and the Ohio Arts Council.

West considered himself an Afrocentric artist. He does not align with modern or post-modern artists. He prefers to integrate the importance of a strong moral society with cultural traditions. Africa is the source for classical art traditions and African and American cultures inspire his imagery. He symbolizes a universal message through the use of traditional tales, mythologies and religion. His most common subject was the black woman. He considered her a symbol for Mother Earth, for the cradle of humanity. She represents the theorized oldest evidence of humanity recently found in Ethiopia. In his work “The Garden” he paints Eve as an enchanting black woman. The painting creates a spiritual energy from the layers of imagery and the balance of color and form.

A solo exhibition Urban Warriors: A Retrospective in the Shot Tower Gallery at Fort Hayes, highlights the strength and energy of his body of work.

West taught at Ohio State University until he suffered a debilitating stroke in March 2016.

In May 2019, was the exhibit Start at Home: Influence, Commitment, Integrity at Urban Arts Space at Ohio State University. There were 143 artworks by H. Ike Okafor-Newsum, Robert J. Stull (1935–1994) and Pheoris West, who all taught in Ohio State's art or black studies departments. Though no longer painting, West did attend the exhibit and greeted gallery patrons.

== Publications ==
=== Art included ===
- Lewis, Samella S. (1994), African American Art and Artists, University of California Press, OCLC 752317650
- Powell, Richard; Reynolds, Jock; Conwill, Kinshasha (1999), To conserve a legacy: American art from historically black colleges and universities, Addison Gallery of American Art, Phillips Academy, OCLC 912153924
- Riggs, Thomas; Dodson, Howard (1997), St. James Guide to Black Artists, St. James Press, OCLC 36470125

=== As writer ===
- West, Pheoris; Cox, Chandra; Adams, Alma S. (1988), American Homeland African Motherland: The Art of Pheoris West, African American Atelier, Inc., OCLC 1135758417
