= Nannette Maciejunes =

- Occupations: Executive Director of the Columbus Museum of Art, Author

Nannette Maciejunes was the executive director of the Columbus Museum of Art from 2003 to 2022 and is the author of many books of art history, with a special focus on the work of Charles E. Burchfield and John Marin.

== Education ==
Maciejunes has a B.F.A. from Denison University, a M.A. from Ohio State University, and is a graduate of Stanford's Executive Program for Nonprofit Leaders and the Getty's Leadership Institute for Museum Management.

== Prior Positions ==
Maciejunes was Director of Denison University's Gallery in 1980, began at the Columbus Museum as a curatorial research assistant in 1984, served as Curator of Collections and Exhibitions at the Dixon Gallery and Gardens in Memphis in 1989 and has occupied her current position since 2003.

== Awards and honors ==
- 2006 Ohio Governor's Award for the Arts in the category of Arts Administration
- 2006 South Side Settlement House Spirit of Volunteerism Award
- 2009 YWCA Woman of Achievement
- 2015 Columbus Business First C-Suite Award Honoree.

== Impact on Columbus Museum of Art ==
Maciejunes guided the museum's acquisition of the Photo League collection and the Schiller Collection of American Social Commentary Art, and the development of the museum's Center for Creativity. Also under her leadership, the museum completed a major renovation and expansion, and was awarded the Institute of Museum and Library Services’ National Medal, the nation's highest honor for museums. Maciejunes has made the work of both local and underrepresented artists a museum focus, which led to the development of a special relationship with Columbus native African American artist Aminah Robinson, who left the museum her estate. In Robinson's memory, the museum is creating a new fellowship program for African American visual artists.

== Bibliography ==
=== As author or co-author ===
- Charles Burchfield Watercolors 1915-1920 (1990)
- Charles E. Burchfield: Romantic Lands (1998)
- Clyde Singer's America (2008)
- George Bellows Revisited: New Considerations of the Painter's Oeuvre (2017)
- Illusions of Eden: Visions of the American Heartland (2000)
- Personal Mythologies: Columbus Painter Lucius Kutchin, 1901-1936 (1988)
- The Paintings of Charles Burchfield: North by Midwest (1997)
- Reflections: The American Collection of the Columbus Museum of Art (2019)
- Stephanie Syjuco: Pattern Migration (2011)
- Thirty-Eight Rare Drawings by Charles Burchfield (1992)
- Trees As Seen Through the Eyes of John Marin and Charles Burchfield (1991)
- Triumph of Color and Light: Ohio Impressionists and Post-Impressionists (1994)

=== As editor or co-editor ===
- Charles Burchfield 1920: The Architecture of Painting (2009)
- In a New Light: Alice Schille and the American Water Color (2019)
