= Elijah Pierce =

American wood carver (1892–1984)

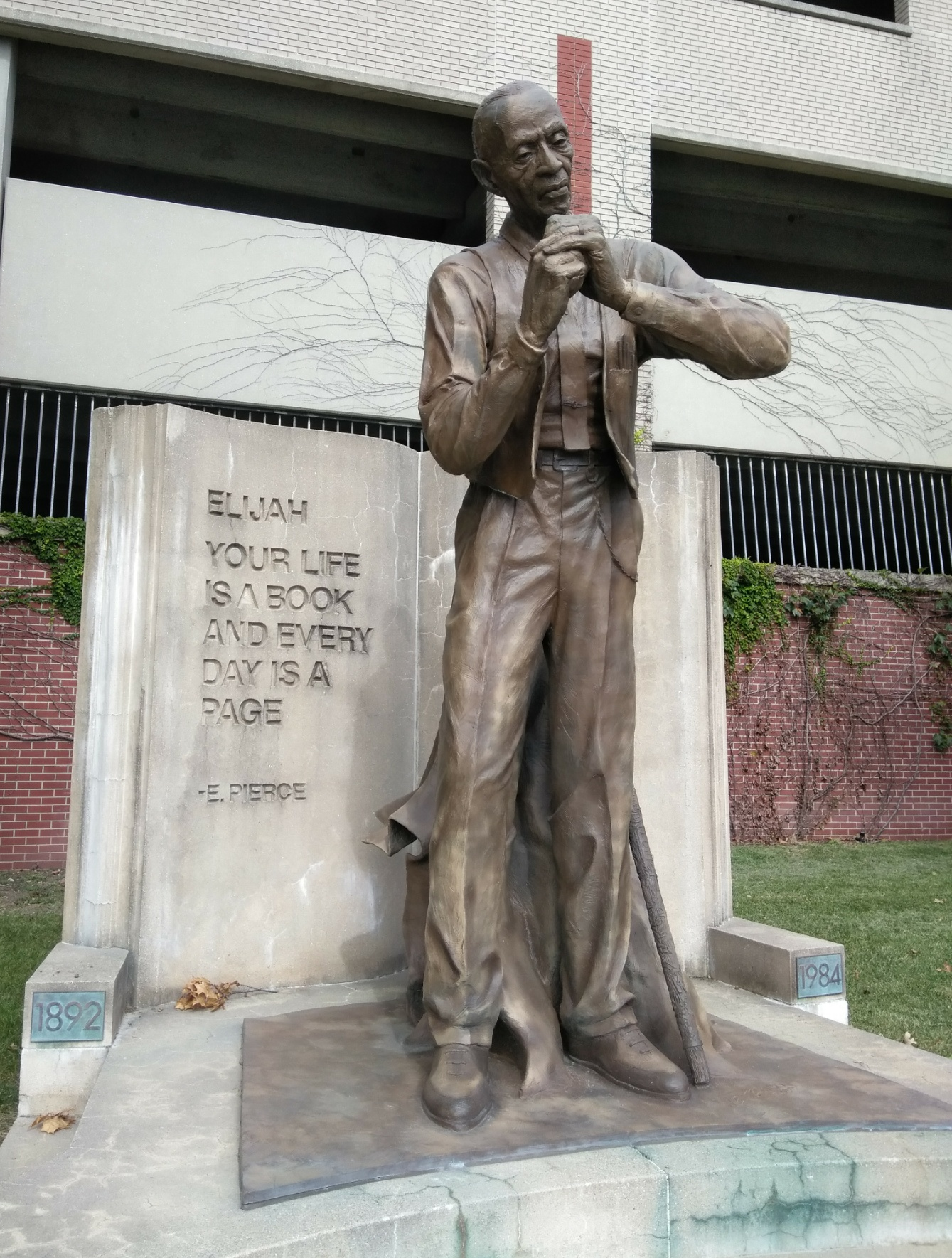
- Sculpture of Pierce in downtown Columbus
- Born: March 5, 1892; Baldwyn, Mississippi, U.S.
- Died: May 7, 1984 (aged 92); Columbus, Ohio, U.S.

Elijah Pierce (1892–1984) was a 20th-century wood carver. He began carving at a young age using a pocket knife. He first started carving animals because of his prior life of growing up on a farm. Pierce was honored in 1982 with a National Heritage Fellowship for his art and influence in the woodcarving community.

== Early life ==
Pierce was the youngest son in his family, born on a farm in Baldwyn, Mississippi, on March 5, 1892. His father was formerly enslaved, and was sold away from his mother by the age of four. Pierce began woodcarving at the age of seven, when his father gave him his first pocketknife. His uncle, Lewis Wallace, taught him how to carve more complex pieces. Pierce would give away his carvings to other children at his school. As a teenager, Pierce decided he did not want to work as a farmer like his father. He began to hang out at the local barbershop, and this is where he found another passion of his. In 1908, he began barbering as a trade, eventually becoming a renowned barber. A spiritual man, he earned a Baptist preacher's license in 1920. He left the South and worked itinerantly across the Mississippi River valley, settling in Columbus, Ohio, in 1923 to work as a barber.

== Artistry ==
Many of Pierce's carving were done for his wives. In the 1920s, Pierce made an entire zoo of wood carved animals for his wife, Cornelia. Each animal represented a different story, sometimes referencing the beasts of Genesis, or animals from folktales of his youth. Pierce's favorite work of his own was the Book of Wood, quite literally a large wooden book that Pierce carved into. The book portrayed the story of Jesus. The Book of Wood was the first type of carving Pierce ever made differing from his typical small sculptures. He would go on to make many more carvings similar to the Book of Wood, each with its own story and universal theme.

== Accomplishments ==
Pierce's work was discovered by the mainstream art world in the early 1970s, and was included in exhibitions at galleries such as the Krannert Art Museum, the Phyllis Kind Gallery of New York, the National Museum of American Art, and the Renwick Gallery. His work is in the collection of the American Folk Art Museum, and in the permanent collection of the Philadelphia Museum of Art.

In 1973, Pierce won first prize in the International Meeting of Naive Art in Zagreb, Yugoslavia. He was a recipient of a 1982 National Heritage Fellowship awarded by the National Endowment for the Arts, which is the United States government's highest honor in the folk and traditional arts. That year's fellowships were the first bestowed by the NEA.

In 1991, he was inducted into the National Barber Museum Hall of Fame.

Pierce is generally regarded and commemorated as one of the greatest and most influential woodcarvers from within the past few centuries.

The Martin Luther King Jr. Performing and Cultural Arts Complex in Columbus, Ohio, named the Elijah Pierce Gallery in his honor. The Columbus Museum of Art has over 300 pieces of his work. Much of Pierce's work and influence was not appreciated until after his death.

== Personal life ==
Pierce was born to a formerly enslaved father. His uncle, Lewis Wallace, taught him how to develop his talent for woodcarving.

Pierce married his first wife, Zetta Palm, and had a son with her. Palm died during the birth of their son. In September 1923, Pierce would marry Cornelia Houeston, his second wife. At the age of 61, Houeston died of cancer in 1948. In 1949, Pierce would marry his third and final wife, Estelle Green.

Pierce remained distant from his only son.

Pierce died on May 7, 1984, at St. Anthony's Hospital in Columbus, of an apparent heart attack.

== See also ==
- Elijah Pierce Properties
