= Southern Ohio Museum =

Coordinates: 38°44′04.2″N 82°59′43.4″W

Southern Ohio Museum and Cultural Center
- Former name: Security Central Bank
- Established: 1979
- Location: 825 Gallia St. Portsmouth, Ohio; USA
- Type: Museum
- Website: www.somacc.com

The Southern Ohio Museum is located in Portsmouth, Ohio, and serves the south and southeastern parts of the state. It is located in the former Security Central Bank Building, which was built in 1918 in the Beaux Arts style. It has been open as a museum since 1979.

== Permanent Exhibits ==
The museum features two permanent exhibits, one devoted to the work of Portsmouth native, Clarence Holbrook Carter, known for his work in the American Scene style, and “Art of the Ancients,” which contains over 10,000 prehistoric Native American objects.

== Other Exhibition Spaces ==
The remaining galleries at the museum are devoted to rotating exhibitions of contemporary Ohio and regional artists. Representative exhibitions include “The Cream of the Crop,” a biennial, juried exhibition with a thirty-year history, "Art 360" which presented a commissioned collection of artist-decorated ostrich eggs from the collection of Charles Bluestone as juxtaposed against the "egg series" of Clarence H. Carter, and "Waiting For Transcendence," a solo exhibition by Columbus artist April Sunami.

== History ==
The Southern Ohio Museum was built as the Security Savings Bank & Trust Company in 1918 by shoe manufacturer George D. Selby. In 1978, after the bank had moved to a new location, the company became the trustees of an artistic bequest from Dr. Russell Leiter (developer of the Leiter International Performance Scale). This inspired the company to donate its old building as a home for a new museum, with Leiter's bequest as its first permanent collection. The museum was initially funded by a $100,000 donation from Edmund J. Kricker, the chief executive officer at the First Federal Savings and Loan Association.

== Cultural Center ==
The Cultural Center portion of the building includes a live performance theater, a reading room and art studios.
