= Greater Columbus Arts Council =

- Winders Motor Sales Company
- U.S. National Register of Historic Places
- Columbus Register of Historic Properties
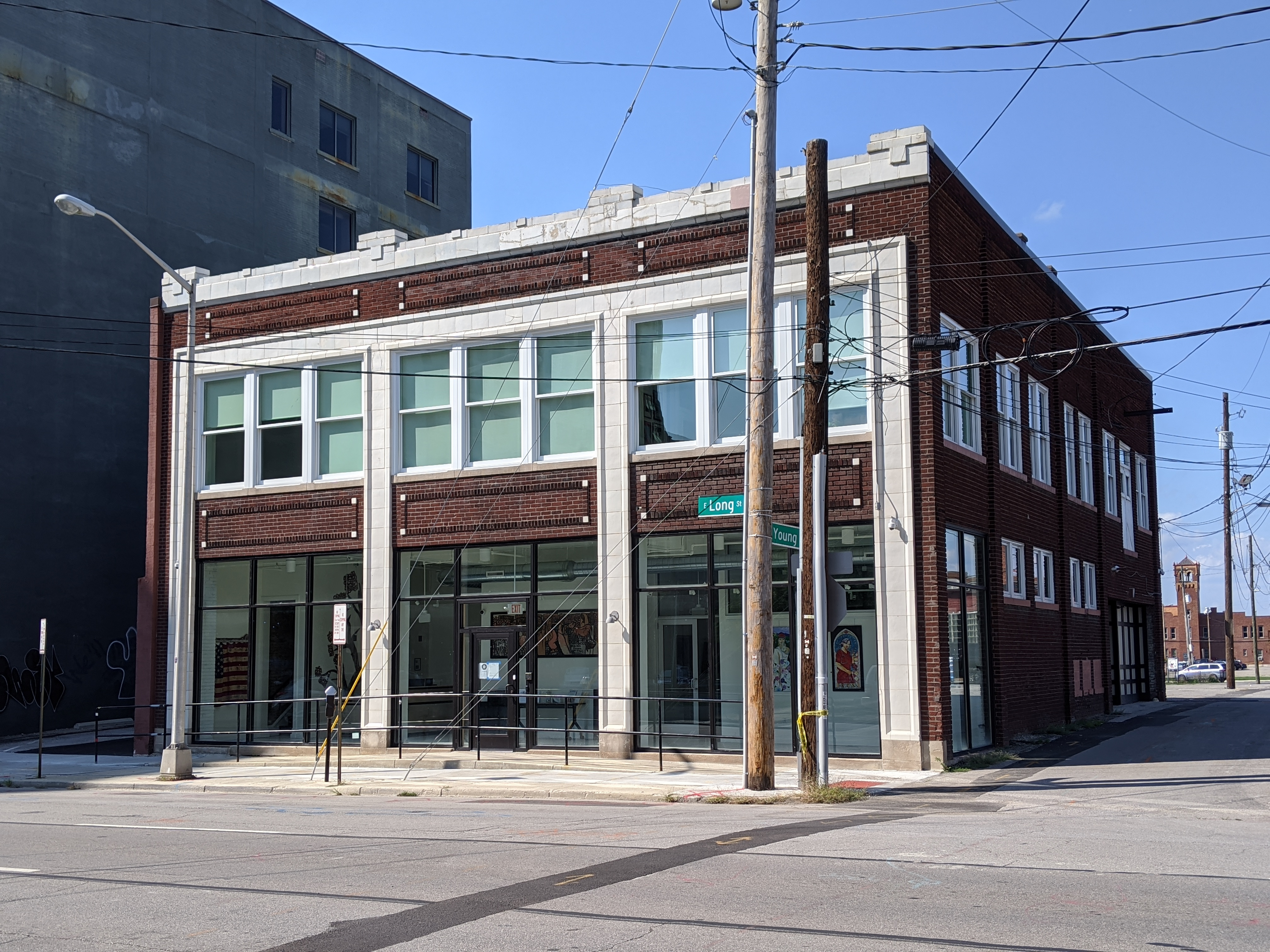
- Interactive map highlighting the building's location
- Location: 182 E. Long St., Columbus, Ohio
- Coordinates: 39.96573°N 82.99625°W
- Built: 1916
- NRHP reference No.: 100004542
- CRHP No.: CR-77

Significant dates
- Added to NRHP: October 18, 2019
- Designated CRHP: March 18, 2019

The Greater Columbus Arts Council (GCAC) is an arts organization in Columbus, Ohio. The council funds artists and organizations in Central Ohio, and hosts the annual Columbus Arts Festival.

== Building ==
The Greater Columbus Arts Council office is the former Winders Motor Sales Company, a historic building in Downtown Columbus. It was listed on the National Register of Historic Places in 2019. The building is one of few early car dealerships remaining in downtown Columbus.

The building was constructed in 1916 during a period of commercial development downtown. The building became an early dealership in the city, and an early commercial business as manufacturing work became less common downtown. In later decades, the building was used in numerous ways, including as a tire store and as a plumbing supply shop. In 2020, the Greater Columbus Arts Council moved from its offices in the Chase Tower into the Winder Motor Sales building. The move increases the council's space, gives it street-level space, and will permit open office hours. The building is owned by Connect Realty, which sought the building's historic listings for tax credits in refurbishing it at a cost of $1.6 million. The realty company owns the adjacent Standard Building, which it has separately listed on historic registers to make restoration more affordable.

The Greater Columbus Arts Council opened its public gallery and first exhibition in the building in July 2020.

== See also ==
- National Register of Historic Places listings in Columbus, Ohio
