= Aminah Robinson =

American Artist

- Born: Brenda Lynn Robinson; February 18, 1940; Columbus, Ohio
- Died: May 22, 2015 (aged 75); Columbus, Ohio
- Education: Columbus College of Art and Design
- Awards: MacArthur Fellows Program

Aminah Brenda Lynn Robinson (February 18, 1940 – May 22, 2015) was an American artist who represented Black history through art.

== Early life and education ==
Robinson was born on February 18, 1940, to Leroy Edward Robinson and Helen Elizabeth Zimmerman-Robinson in Columbus, Ohio. She was raised within the close-knit community of Poindexter Village, one of the country's first federally funded metropolitan housing developments. The village was "replete with Black cultural traditions such as storytelling, reverence for elders and promotion of creativity". It was here where she first learnt Black history. Robinson’s Aunt Annie, formerly a slave, taught her about the cruel system of slavery.

Family played a significant role in the formation of Robinson's identity. She was heavily inspired by her parents, Leroy Robinson and Helen Zimmerman-Robinson, who were both artists. Her father encouraged her to draw from the age of 3 and gave her opportunities to learn about her history from elders in the community. He insisted that she listen to music, read literature, and create art every day. Her father taught her how to work with raw materials and scrap fabrics, specifically, the old-fashioned methods of rabbit-skin glue, and different colored natural pigments. He also taught her his own creation of a mud-like substance called HawgMawg, a medium she often incorporates into her art. Her mother taught her how to sew and weave. The combination of these skills and materials allowed her to create depth and layers in her art.

Art was Robinson's "first outlet of expression"; she did not begin speaking until she was 5 or 6, before then her only form of communication was drawing. At 9 years old, Robinson was already deep in "transforming and recording the culture of [her] people into works of art", and since then she has devoted her life to it. She developed the habit of recording information through sketchbooks, journals and drawings to retain the information that fueled her work.

Robinson received her formal art training at the Columbus Art School (now the Columbus College of Art and Design) from 1957–1960. She continued to live and work in Columbus. Then she studied art history and philosophy at Ohio State University (1960 to 1963), Franklin University, and Columbus' Bliss College.

In 1974, she purchased a house on Columbus's East Side which would become her studio.

== Work ==
Robinson's art is always "historically or geographically" grounded. Her diverse body of work ranges from drawings and woodcuts to complex sculptures. The artist's "Memory Maps" (multi-media constructions of appliquéd cloth panels) contain "the idea and symbols of Africa—as a reservoir of culture, as the abode of spirits and inspiration for form and meanings that have traversed the great transatlantic African Diaspora to the Americas." Robinson also created colorful sheet music, which has been described as "as beautiful to look at as they are to play." In addition, Robinson illustrated children's books to empower and educate the next generation. She also created RagGonNon's, long pieces of fabric filled with diverse materials. The title RagGonNon alludes to the extreme length; the piece rags on and on. The largest RagGonNon was 118 ft long and weighed 200 lbs. Some took decades to complete; the Water Street RagGonNon took 25 years, it shows African Americans living daily life in downtown Columbus.

Robinson produced art to record the missing pieces of Black history that were lost during slavery. Her art is about the "African experience" of "racism and discrimination". Robinson transformed her ancestors' experiences of Black suffering and perseverance into art. Her work centered around Sankofa, an African concept of retrieving information from history in order to make progress for the future.

Robinson worked tirelessly on the civil rights movement in the 1950s and participated in the 1963 March on Washington that advocated for African American rights.

=== Mediums ===
Robinson included several diverse mediums into her work, including different fabrics, snakeskin, buttons, HowMawg and any commercial art supplies. HawgMawg is a sculptural material consisting of mud, pig grease, glue, twigs and lime that gave her sculptures a "petrified quality". She used beads and shells to demonstrate the connection to Black history, and added music boxes into RagGonNons to bring them to life. Robinson’s use of recycled materials was "ecological and practical".

=== Artistic influences ===
Robinson had a "larger-than-life personality". She took pride in her identity; Deidre Hamlar, the co-curator of Columbus Museum of Art said that "when most Black people [were] trying to assimilate and fit in, she definitely was not that person".

Friend and colleague Kojo Kamau of Columbus' ACE Gallery first encouraged Robinson to travel to Africa, raising money through the non-profit, Art for Community Expression, created specifically to raise money for artists to travel to Africa. On her trip to Africa in 1979, Robinson was christened with the name "Aminah" (derived from Aamina, mother of the Islamic prophet Muhammad) by an Egyptian cleric. She changed her name legally to include the forename in 1980. Robinson felt that traveling "enrich[ed] herself and her work".

Robinson's dedication to her art influenced every aspect of her life; her tools and supplies filled every room. Robinson worked day in and day out, she was "up with the sun, down late at night, sleeping only a few hours before starting again".

== Awards and achievements ==
In 1984, Robinson received the Ohio Governor's Award for the Visual Arts. In 2004, she was awarded the MacArthur Genius Grant for folk artists. The grant celebrates themes of "family, ancestry, and the grandeur of simple objects in drawings, paintings, and large-scale, mixed-media assemblages".

Her work has been displayed at the Columbus Museum of Art, the Tacoma Art Museum, and the Brooklyn Museum. Robinson had been the subject of nearly two hundred solo and group exhibitions before the 2002 retrospective, Symphonic Poem: The Art of Aminah Brenda Lynn Robinson at the Columbus Museum of Art.

== Personal life ==
In 1964, Robinson married Clarence Robinson, later separating in 1971. The couple had a son, Sydney, who died by suicide in 1994.

== Death and legacy ==
On May 22, 2015, Robinson died of a heart complication. She left all her belongings to the Columbus Museum of Art. The museum established the "Aminah Robinson Legacy project" to continue to promote her work. As part of the project, the museum transformed her house into a residency area for Black Artists.
