= Jones Heel Manufacturing Company buildings =

Historic buildings in Columbus, Ohio

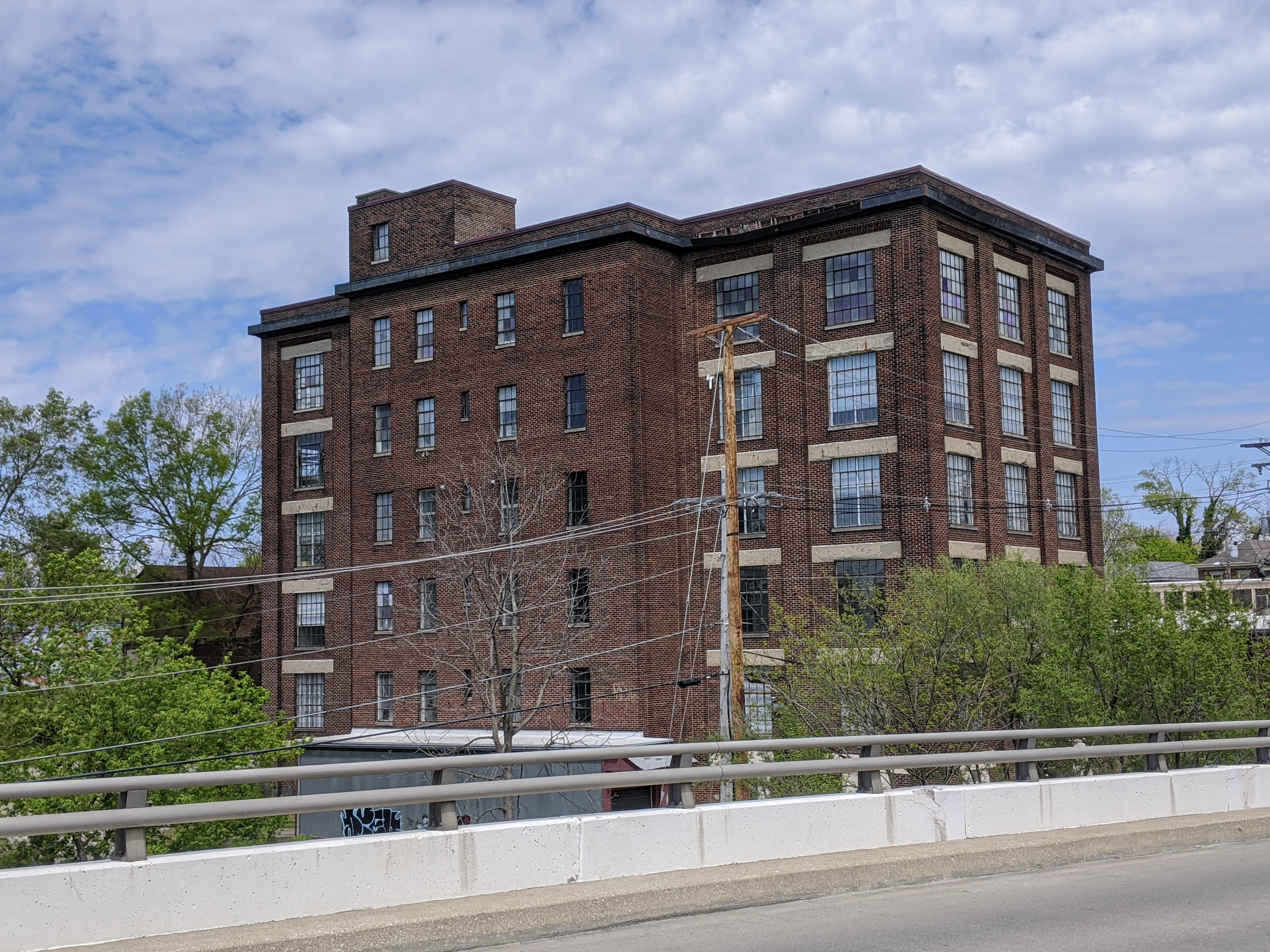
- The manufacturing building in 2020
- Location: 841-843 S. Front Street, Columbus, Ohio
- Coordinates: 39.94447°N 82.99940°W

The Jones Heel Manufacturing Company buildings are a set of historic industry buildings in the Brewery District neighborhood of Columbus, Ohio. The buildings, at the entrance to the Scioto Audubon Metro Park, housed the factory and warehouse of the Jones Heel Manufacturing Company, one of several shoe companies in the city in the 20th century, and one of the largest in the U.S. in 1919. The buildings are currently vacant.

== Attributes ==
The buildings are contributing properties of the Brewery District historic district, overseen by the Brewery District Commission. The main building, a six-story brick and concrete structure, has 33,183 sq ft (3,082.8 m^{2}) of floor space. A single-story warehouse building is adjacent; it has 17,942 sq ft (1,666.9 m^{2}) and still bears a sign for the manufacturing company.

== History ==
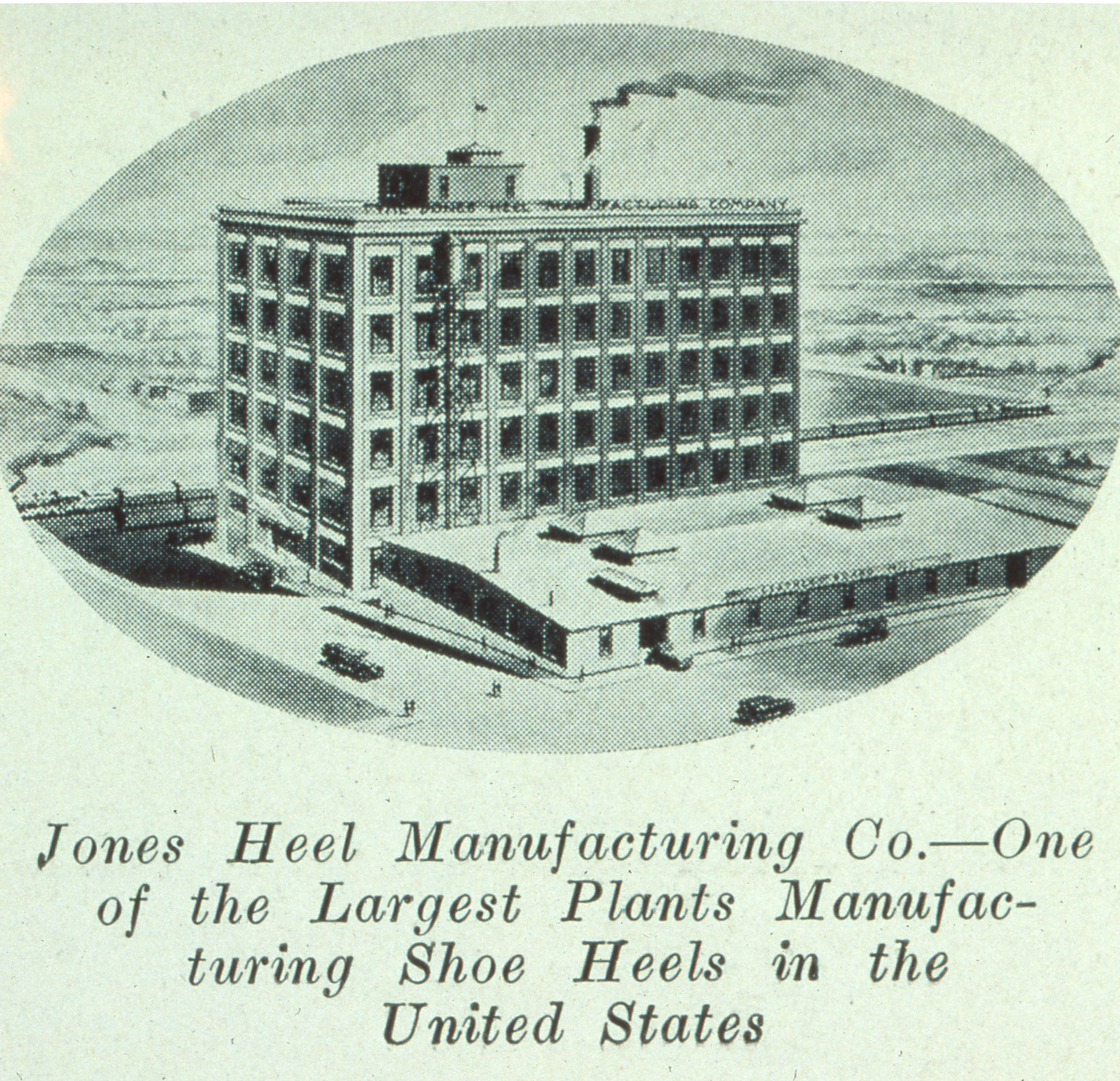
The complex in 1919

The Jones Heel Manufacturing Company buildings were constructed in 1917. The manufacturing plant was a division of the Jones Shoe Manufacturing Co., which was located to its south, at 893 S. Front Street.

The Stonehenge Company, a developer based in Gahanna, purchased the property in September 2019 for $1.85 million.

A 2021 plan by the Stonehenge Company called for building a new high-rise apartment building on the site and preserving (though obscuring) the existing high-rise, converting it into 34 apartments. The plan involves the demolition of the warehouse building and a historic single-family house nearby, a brick Italianate structure built in 1876. Stonehenge's plan was met with opposition from Columbus Landmarks and the Brewery District Commission. The commission noted that the warehouse and single-family house are contributing properties to the city's historic district, and are not recommended for demolition.
