= MKSK =

Landscape architecture firm based in Ohio

- Predecessor: KKG, LLC; Kinzelman Kline, Inc.; MSI Design; Myers Schmalenberger, Inc.; MSK2, LLC
- Founded: 1990
- Founder: Brian Kinzelman; Keith Myers; Timothy Schmalenberger; Mark Kline
- Headquarters: Columbus, Ohio
- Website: https://mkskstudios.com

MKSK is an American planning, urban design, and landscape architecture firm headquartered in Columbus, Ohio. Founded in 1990, the firm is known for its work reshaping Central Ohio, particularly downtown Columbus. MKSK is an employee-owned practice with a network of twelve metropolitan studios in Ohio, Illinois, Indiana, Kentucky, South Carolina, Georgia, Florida, New York, and the District of Columbia.

== Attributes ==
The company's designs aim to create pedestrian-friendly designs, including reconnecting neighborhoods divided by highways. When working with communities or organizations, MKSK works to understand challenges associated with the project while capitalizing on opportunities that have the potential to benefit the community. Some of the ways the company achieves this is through surveys and research to understand previous initiatives.

The company has been instrumental in envisioning Columbus' and other cities urban planning initiatives to accommodate for growth and community-focused public spaces. In 2000, MKSK created masterplan for the Arena District and since then have master planned or designed a majority of projects that have transformed downtown Columbus. Their work has included Capitol Square, the Discovery District, Scioto Audubon Metro Park, and Quarry Trails Metro Park.

== History ==
MKSK was founded in 2011, from a merger between MSI Design and Kinzelman Kline Gossman (KKG), both of which were founded in 1990. The merger happened after the firms won a commission together at the Ohio State University and decided they could be stronger together than as competition.

In 2019, the company reorganized its ownership from being held between ten partners into an employee stock ownership plan (ESOP), making its employees the owners of the company. CEO Brian Kinzelman described the change as driven by the desire to attract and retain employees through a sense of comradery.

In 2022, Kinzelman was replaced as CEO by Eric Lucas, a principal at the firm. Prior to becoming CEO, Lucas had started firm offices in Indianapolis and Lafayette, Indiana.

== Designs ==
Since about 2000, the firm or its predecessors have designed or created master plans for nearly every public space in downtown Columbus.

=== Columbus ===
- Master plan for the Arena District, including the new Crew Stadium
- Grandview Yard master plan and First Avenue Park
- The Scioto Mile
  - Dorrian Green park
  - Genoa Park
  - McFerson Commons
  - North Bank Park
  - Scioto Audubon Metro Park and Grange Insurance Audubon Center
  - Scioto Mile Promenade
- Scioto Peninsula plan
- Twelve bridge caps over I-70 and I-71 surrounding Downtown Columbus
- Entryways around the city's Main Library and Columbus Museum of Art
- Livingston Park and green space at Nationwide Children's Hospital
- Oval at the James Cancer Hospital
- Capitol Square streetscape design
- Discovery District streetscape design
- Central quad at the Columbus College of Art & Design
- Quarry Trails Metro Park
- Urban plan for the 15+High development in the University District
- City of Columbus municipal campus master plan
- Huntington Park
- Franklin County Courthouse and Government Center grounds
- Burnham Square park

=== Other cities ===
- Riverside Crossing Park in Dublin, Ohio
- Rose Run Park in New Albany, Ohio
- Rose Music Center in Dayton, Ohio

== Awards ==
- 2015 OCASLA Honor Award, Bike New Albany Plan, New Albany, Ohio
- 2022 OCASLA Honor Award, Buckeye Lake Pier Design & North Shore State Park Redevelopment Plan, Buckeye Lake, Ohio
- 2022 Award of Excellence, Rose Run Park Phase 1, New Albany, Ohio
- 2021 APA-KY Special Merit Award for Outstanding Neighborhood Plan, Butchertown, Phoenix & NuLu Neighborhood Plan. Louisville, Kentucky
- 2022 APA-IN Hoosier Planning Award Honorable Mention for Outstanding Economic Development, Castleton Strategic Revitalization Plan, Indianapolis, Indiana
- 2018 National Planning Achievement Award for Best Practice-Silver, City of Columbus Green Business and Urban Agriculture Strategic Plan/Columbus & Franklin County Local Food Action Plan/The City-County Joint Local Food Team, Columbus, Ohio
- 2017 APA Ohio Planning Award for a Best Practice, City of Columbus Green Business and Urban Agriculture Strategic Plan/Columbus & Franklin County Local Food Action Plan/The City-County Joint Local Food Team, Columbus, Ohio
- 2017 OCASLA Honor Award, Communications & Research, City of Columbus Green Business and Urban Agriculture Strategic Plan/Columbus & Franklin County Local Food Action Plan/The City-County Joint Local Food Team, Columbus, Ohio
- 2010 OCASLA Honor Award, Cheapside Park Entertainment District and Pavilion, Lexington, Kentucky
