= Flowing Kiss =

Sculpture in Columbus, Ohio, U.S.

- Artist: Lawrence Argent
- Year: 2013
- Medium: Stainless steel sculpture
- Location: Columbus, Ohio, United States
- 39°57′56.37″N 83°00′34.50″W

Flowing Kiss is an art installation consisting of two 2013 stainless steel sculptures by Lawrence Argent, installed at North Bank Park in Columbus, Ohio, United States. According to The Sculpture Center's Outdoor Sculpture Inventory, the sculptures face one another, and "both are wide, rippling shape that narrows to lips ready for a kiss". They were installed in 2013.

== See also ==
- 2013 in art
