= Arc de 124,5° =

Sculpture by Bernar Venet in Berlin, Germany

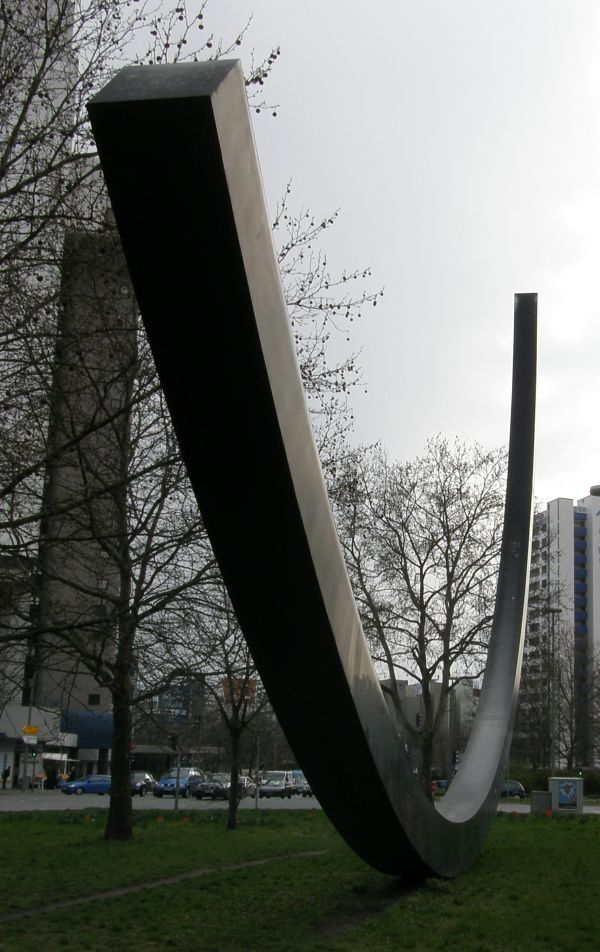
- The sculpture in 2008
- Location: Berlin, Germany
- 52°30′05″N 13°20′50″E

Arc de 124,5° is an outdoor sculpture by the French conceptual artist Bernar Venet, installed in Tempelhof-Schöneberg, Berlin, Germany.
