= Rose Music Center =

Amphitheater in Huber Heights, Ohio, US

- Interactive map of Rose Music Center
- Full name: Stuart & Mimi Rose Music Center at The Heights
- Address: 6800 Executive Boulevard
- Location: Huber Heights, Ohio
- Coordinates: 39.86944°N 84.11094°W
- Owner: City of Huber Heights
- Operator: Music and Event Management, Inc.
- Capacity: 4,200

Construction
- Groundbreaking: 2013
- Opened: May 2, 2015
- Cost: $19.3 million
- Architects: MKSK, GGBN

Website
- https://www.rosemusiccenter.com

The Stuart & Mimi Rose Music Center at The Heights is a 4,200 seat fully covered outdoor amphitheatre located in Huber Heights, Ohio, adjacent to Interstate 70 just north of Dayton.

== History ==
Construction began on the facility in 2013 and was completed in time for the 2015 concert season. The Rose Music Center is owned by the city of Huber Heights and operated by Music and Event Management of Cincinnati.

The facility is part of The Heights, an 800-acre residential and retail development. The Huber Heights city council approved the project in March 2013, with an estimated budget of $18 million. The final stated cost of the project was $19.3 million. The facility received its name in January 2015, when the city council approved a lifetime naming rights agreement with the Stuart Rose Family Foundation. Rose is the CEO of Dayton-based REX American Resources, a producer of ethanol. The venue opened on May 2, 2015, with a concert by the Christian rock band Needtobreathe.

Other musical acts that have played at the Rose are Whitesnake, Sheryl Crow, John Legend, Jason Isbell and the 400 Unit, Daughtry, Chicago, Sammy Hagar, Travis Tritt, Buddy Guy, Aly&AJ, Toad the Wet Sprocket, Collective Soul, Dream, 98 Degrees, Gin Blossoms, Brett Elderidge, Brian Wilson, Marc Cohn, Michael McDonald, Chaka Khan, O.A.R., Styx, 311, Amos Lee, Bruce Hornsby, Sugarland, Tedeschi Trucks Band, Los Lobos, the Mavericks, The Righteous Brothers, The Temptations, Air Supply, Sarah McLachlan, TESLA, Foreigner, Bush, Live, REO Speedwagon, Stone Temple Pilots, Rick Springfield, Lynyrd Skynyrd, Vince Gill, Gary Allan, Tonic, Our Lady Peace, The Four Tops, Trace Adkins Boston, Joan Jett, Willie Nelson, Rob Zombie, Huey Lewis and the News, Switchfoot, Lifehouse, Goo Goo Dolls, Brit Floyd, Geoff Tate, Alice Cooper, among many others.
