= Bernar Venet =

French conceptual artist (born 1941)

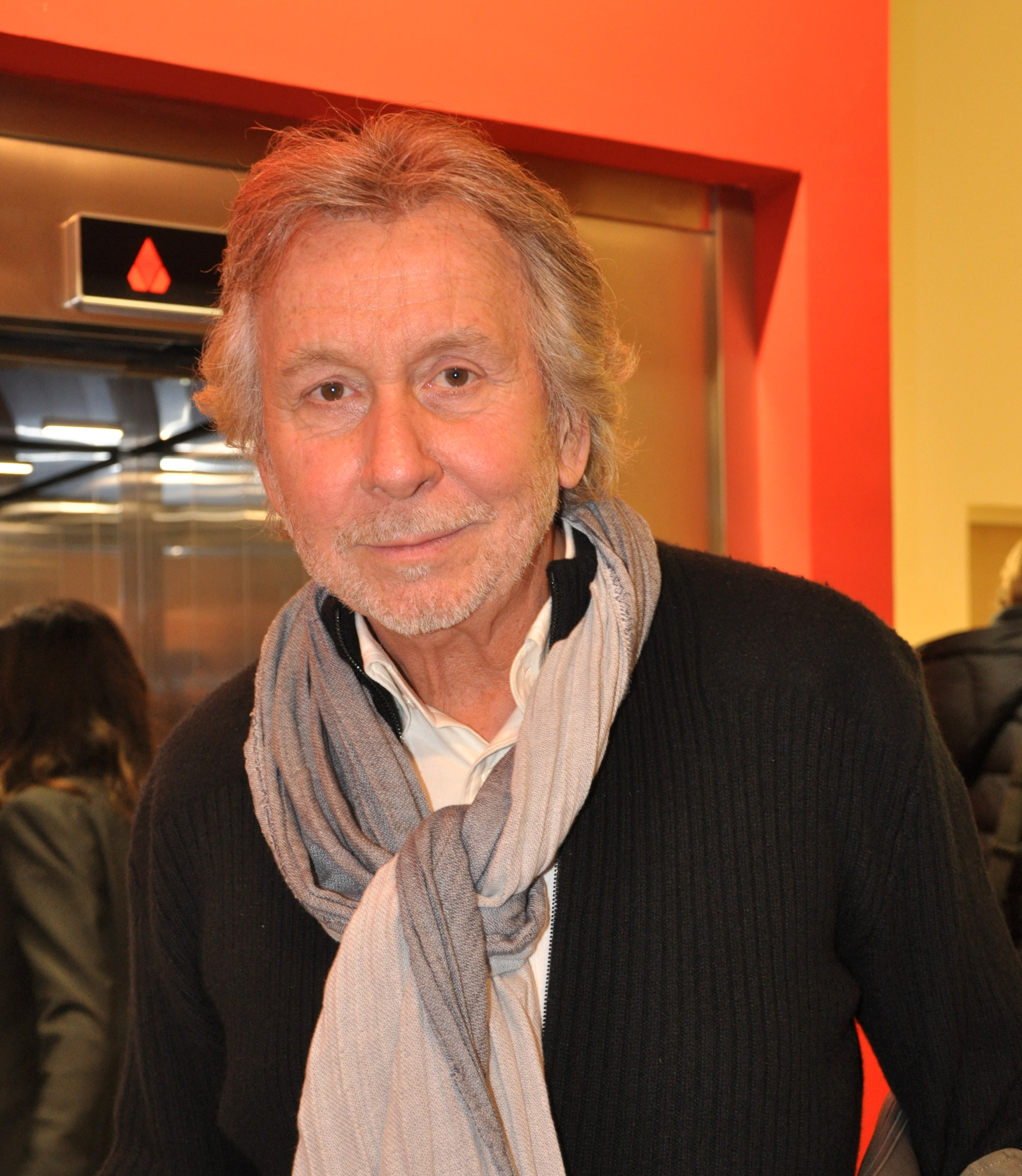
- Venet in Antibes, 2013
- Born: 20 April 1941 (age 85); Château-Arnoux-Saint-Auban, Alpes-de-Haute-Provence, France
- Notable work: Arcs
- Movement: Conceptual art
- Awards: Chevalier de La Legion d'Honneur
- Website: bernarvenet.com

Bernar Venet (born 20 April 1941) is a French conceptual artist. He was the 2016 recipient of the International Sculpture Center's Lifetime Achievement Award.

== Early life ==
Bernar Venet was born to Jean-Marie Venet, a school teacher and chemist, and Adeline Gilly and was the youngest of four boys. He was brought up in Château-Arnoux-Saint-Auban and had a religious upbringing, aspiring to become a missionary. He struggled with asthma and academic subjects at school, while excelling in drawing and painting. With the support of a local artist, he became interested in painting and drawing at a young age. At age 11, discovering a book on Pierre-Auguste Renoir, he first considered making a career of art.

After several attempts at gaining a formal education in the arts, he worked as a stage designer at the Nice Opera in 1959. In 1961, Venet joined the French Army whilst also starting to establish his style as an artist. During this period, he painted with tar, creating his art with his feet in a gestural style. This work eventually developed into black monochromatic paintings which eschewed all forms of action painting.

== Career ==
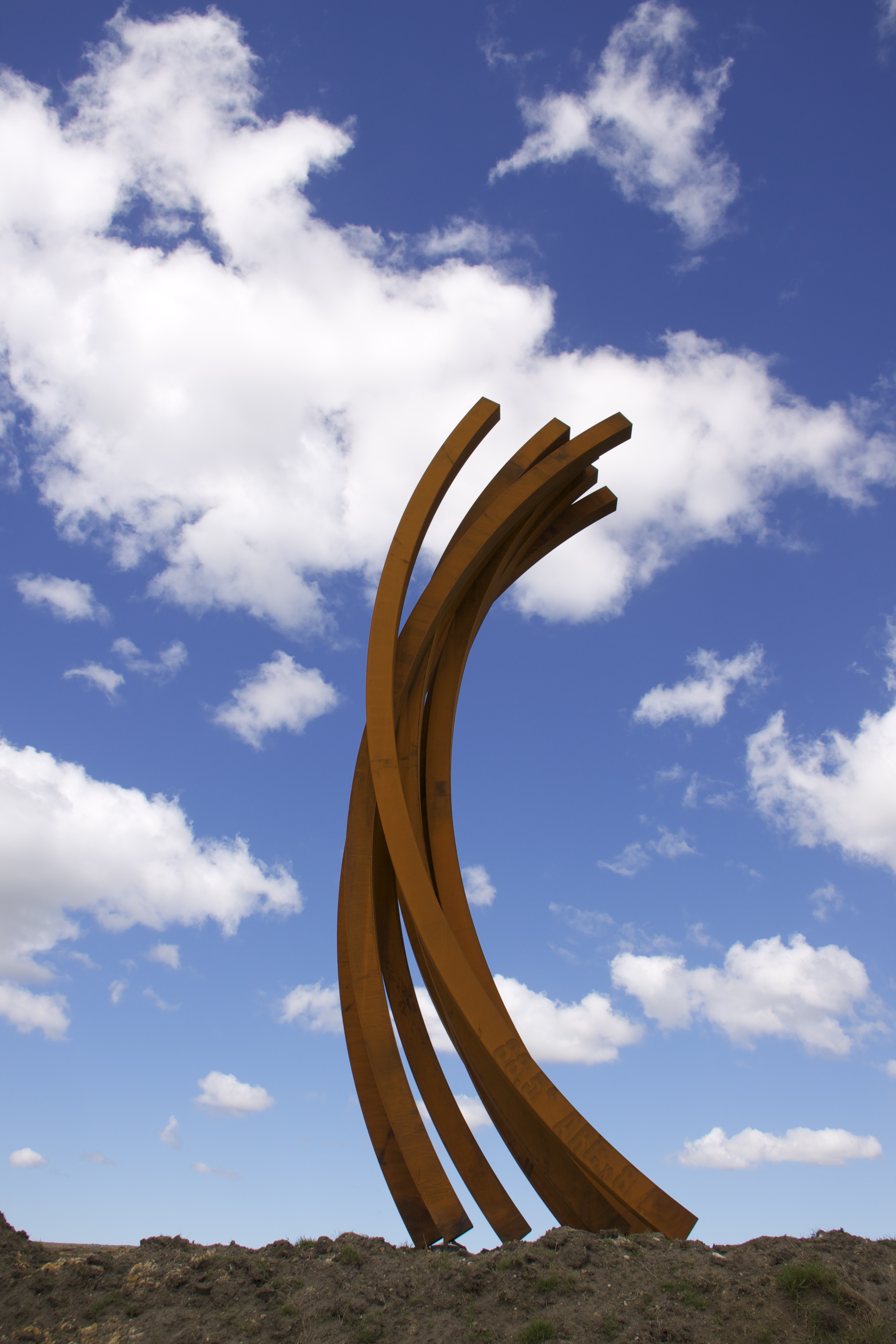
88.5 Arc × 8, 2012, Gibbs Farm, Kaipara Harbour, New Zealand

After completing his military service, Venet returned to Nice, where he established his studio and continued to explore painting with tar, creating art with coal, and photography. His early sculpture Tas de Charbon ("Pile of Coal") reflected his obsession with making art that changes the history of art; it was "the first sculpture devoid of a specific shape, where you could alter its size or exhibit it in various locations at the same time, and where the coal wasn’t used to create an artwork, but instead was the artwork itself."

=== 1960s ===
Subsequently, Venet became familiar with the work of Arman and some of the New Realists in Paris, such as César Baldaccini, Raymond Hains and Jacques Villeglé, and started sculpting with cardboard. He exhibited alongside New Realists and pop artists' works in the Salon Comparisons at the Paris Museum of Modern Art.

In 1966, during a two-month visit to New York City, Venet was influenced by minimalism, consequently incorporating this style into his art (cfr. Tubes). In 1967, Venet moved to New York and shared fellow artist Arman's studio, at 84 Walker Street (formerly Jean Tinguely's). In the late 1960s, Venet's work was published in 0 to 9 magazine, an avant-garde journal which experimented with language and meaning-making.

=== 1970s ===
From 1971 to 1976, Venet did not create any art, entering a period of retrospection. He took up teaching Art and Art Theory at the Paris-Sorbonne University, and frequented lectures in England, Italy, Poland and Belgium. He resumed his artistic activity in 1976, exhibiting works at "Documenta VI" in Kassel in 1977. In 1979, he created a series of wood reliefs, entitling them Arcs, Angels, Diagonals. and had a solo exhibition at the Hal Bromm Gallery in New York, NY.

=== 1980s and 1990s ===
During the 1980s, Venet continued to develop his art along logical lines. He also composed, choreographed and imagined the costumes and designs for Jean-Louis Martinoty’s production of the ballet Graduation. In the 1990s, he created his Indeterminate Lines series and subsequently his Arcs, which have been exhibited at various locations, including Versailles and internationally.

His 1994 piece Four Indeterminate Lines is exhibited at the Skulpturen Park Köln.

== Recent years ==
Venet’s work has become known internationally, with sculptures exhibited in Belgium, America, Japan, Austria, Switzerland, Germany, Canada and more recently New Zealand. In 2005, Venet received the title of Chevalier de La Legion d’Honneur, France’s highest honour.

In 2012, Venet was commissioned by Alan Gibbs, an art collector based in New Zealand. His newest and largest sculpture stands in the Gibbs Farm sculpture park. That same year, the luxury car maker Bugatti invited Venet to create a one-off artwork to be applied to a Veyron Grand Sport. The finished work, described as "the fastest artwork ever", was revealed at the Rubell Family Collection in Miami during Art Basel Miami Beach.

Venet has also had a major presence in Asia in collaboration with de Sarthe. In 2012, the artist had a major exhibition of public art in Hong Kong in collaboration with the gallery, showing 7 large-scale steel sculptures in the piazzas adjacent to the Hong Kong Cultural Centre and Hong Kong Museum of Art. In 2019, de Sarthe and Sotheby's co-organized a live performance by Venet to benefit amfAR. In 2024, a major retrospective exhibition, Beyond Concept and Matter, was hosted for the artist at the Phoenix Center in Beijing, curated by Jonas Stampe and Xiao Ge, in partnership with de Sarthe and the artist's studio. The exhibition featured almost 180 works Venet produced across his career and was later travelled to the Guangdong Museum of Art, Guangzhou China.

In 2016, Venet was awarded the International Sculpture Center's Lifetime Achievement in Contemporary Sculpture Award.

Venet was represented by Blain Southern from 2016 until the gallery went into administration in early 2020. In November 2020, it was announced that Venet had joined the roster of Waddington Custot in London. In 2022, in his first exhibition with Waddington Custot, Hypotheses, Venet presented a new collection of his large-scale Angles series, alongside drawings and smaller sculptures. In 2021 he joined König Galerie and exhibited at the Ceysson & Bénétière Gallery in Paris.

In December 2025, Venet's 18-meter sculpture Convergence: 54.5° Arc x 14 was gifted to China to mark the 60th anniversary of the establishment of Sino-French diplomatic relations, an occasion that led to a private conversation between the artist, French President Emmanuel Macron and Chinese President Xi Jinping.

== Works ==
- Arc de 124,5° (1987), Tempelhof-Schöneberg, Berlin
- Indeterminate Line (1987), Beverly Hills, California (58-inch high); a later version (2004), Colorado Convention Center, Denver
- Two Indeterminate Lines (1993), Massachusetts Institute of Technology (MIT) campus, Cambridge, Massachusetts
- Convergence: 52.5° Arc x 14 (2025), Phoenix Center, Beijing, China

== Selected bibliography ==
- Derieux, Florence, Barry Schwabsky, Clare Lilley, Bernar Venet, Phaidon Press, London, 2020
- Davila, Thierry (ed.), La conversion du regard, Musée d'Art Moderne et Contemporain, Geneva, Switzerland, 2013
- Chappell, Daniel, "Big Art on Highway 16", in Art News New Zealand. Autumn 2012, pp. 84–90
- Du Chateau, Carroll; White, David, "Out There – Inside the extraordinary world of one of New Zealand's richest people" in New Zealand Listener, no. 3749, 17 March 2012
- Altieri, Gilles and Olivier Schefer, Bernar Venet, Peintures 2001-2011 Hôtel des Arts, Toulon, France, 2011
- Beate Reifenscheid and Dorothea van der Koelen; Arte in Movimento – Kunst in Bewegung, Dokumente unserer Zeit XXXIV; Chorus-Verlag; Mainz 2011; ISBN 978-3-926663-44-3
- Marcadé, Bernard, Brian O'Doherty, Venet – Versailles, Editions du Regard, Paris, France, 2011
- Laks, Déborah, L'hypothèse de la ligne droite, Editions de la Différence, Paris, France, 2010
- Kuspit, Donald, Art: A Matter of Context, Writings 1975–2003: Bernar Venet, Hard Press Editions, 2004
- McEvilley, Thomas, Bernar Venet, Artha Benteli, 2002
- Rose, Barbara, La paradoja de la coherencia / The paradox of coherence, La imprenta & Institut Valencià d'Art Modern (IVAM), Valencia, Spain, 2010
- Schefer, Olivier, Bernar Venet: Paintings 1961-2011: A Retrospective, Seoul, South Korea
- Francblin, Catherine, Bernar Venet : toute une vie pour l'art, Editions Gallimard, Paris, France, 2022 (Témoins de l'art)
