= Colorado Convention Center =

Convention center in Denver, Colorado, US

Coordinates: 39°44′31″N 104°59′46″W

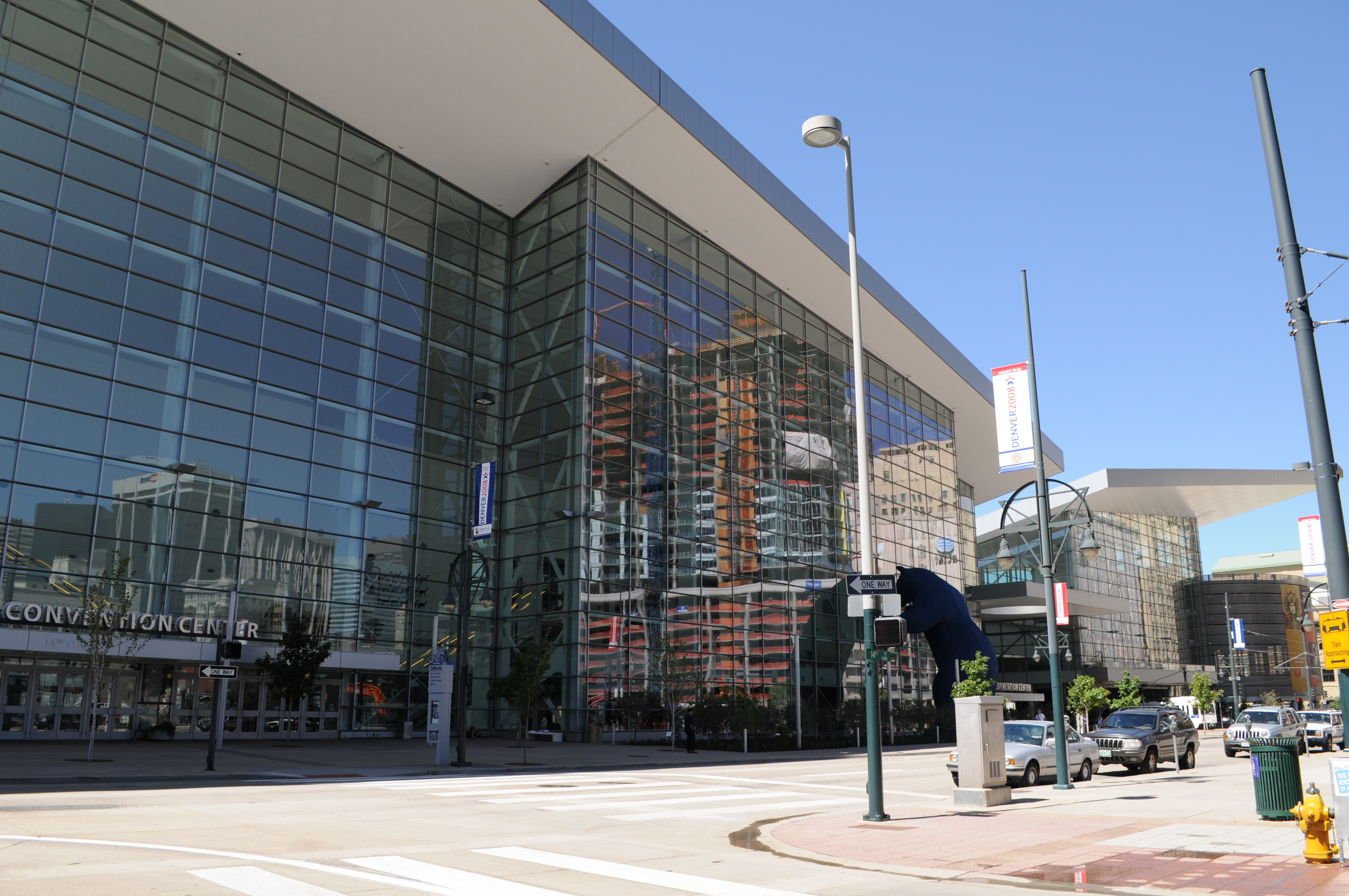
- Exterior of convention center
- Interactive map of Colorado Convention Center
- Former names: Denver County Convention and Expo Center (planning/construction)
- Address: 700 14th Street; Denver, CO 80202-3213
- Location: Downtown Denver
- Owner: City and County of Denver
- Operator: ASM Global
- Capacity: 3,472 (Four Seasons Ballroom); 5,452 (Mile High Ballroom); 38,997 (Exhibit Hall)
- Public transit: Theatre District / Convention Center

Construction
- Opened: June 23, 1990
- Expanded: 2004
- Cost: $7 million (original) $340 million (2004 expansion)

Website
- Venue Website

The Colorado Convention Center (CCC) is a multi-purpose convention center located in Downtown Denver, Colorado. At 2,200,000 square feet (total space) it is currently the 12th largest convention center in the United States. Opening in 1990, the convention center expanded in 2004 to include several meeting rooms, two ballrooms and an indoor amphitheater. Since opening, the center hosts an average of around 400 events per year. Centrally located in the city, it has become one of Denver's many landmarks due to its architecture and is adjacent to the Denver Performing Arts Complex and is just blocks away from the Colorado State Capitol, Auraria Campus and the 16th Street Mall. The CCC is directly served via light rail by RTD's Theatre District–Convention Center station.

== Background ==
The Colorado Convention Center is owned by the City and County of Denver but is privately managed by ASM Global since 1994 The convention center opened in June 1990 with an exhibition hall, five meeting rooms and a main ballroom, totaling 800,000 square feet (74,000 m^{2}).

=== 2004 expansion ===
The Colorado Convention Center underwent a $340 million major expansion that was completed in December 2004. The expansion doubled the size of the facility to 2.2 million square feet (200,000 m^{2}) that includes 584,000 square feet (54,300 m^{2}) of exhibit space, 100,000 square feet (9,300 m^{2}) of meeting rooms, and 85,000 square feet (7,900 m^{2}) of ballroom space and included the 5,000 seat Bellco Theatre. The CCC also boasts an attached 1,000 space, 3-level parking structure as well as its own RTD (Regional Transportation District) Light Rail stop. The Hyatt Regency Denver, completed around the same time as the CCC expansion, is located across 14th Street from the convention center and is one of Denver's Top Ten tallest buildings with 38 floors at a height of 489 feet (149 m). Across Welton Street, on the historic registry, is the Denver Athletic Club.

=== 2021 to 2023 expansion ===
Starting in mid-2021 the convention center began construction on a new expansion project. Upon completion this will include new flexible meeting and ballroom space of approximately 85,000 square feet, 100,000 square feet of new pre-function and service space, and a 50,000 square foot outdoor terrace to be located on the roof of the existing convention center which will provide unobstructed views of both downtown and the mountains. In all, approximately 235,000 square feet of usable space will be added bringing the total usable floor area to around 2.5 million when the project is completed in 2023. This would make the facility the seventh largest in the U.S. using today's convention center statistics. The expansion will be completely integrated into the existing CCC footprint and involves no outward expansion of the current facility.

=== Public art ===
A public art collection is featured throughout the interior and exterior of the convention center. The most visible work is I See What You Mean by Lawrence Argent, located on the north east side of the convention center just to the left of the main entrance on 14th Street. Erected in June 2005, the 40-foot (12 m)-tall polymer-concrete-clad sculpture is in the form of a lapis-lazuli-colored bear pushing its nose and paws against the glass facade, attempting to peek inside. Its installation was part of the Denver Office of Cultural Affairs' Public Art Program. This collection is featured on many of Denver's cultural tours.

== Location ==
The CCC is bounded by 14th Street, Speer Boulevard, Champa Street and Welton Street. Stout Street runs underneath the building, as does the (RTD) Light Rail's Central Corridor. Currently the D, F and H lines run through this corridor's stop. The CCC is linked by a pedestrian bridge across Champa Street to the Denver Performing Arts Complex with its nine theatres. It is across Welton Street from the Emily Griffith Opportunity School. The University of Colorado Denver, Metropolitan State University of Denver, and the Community College of Denver are all located to the west across Speer Boulevard at the Auraria Campus. The Colorado Convention Center is central to many other downtown attractions including: the 16th Street Mall, the Denver Pavilions, the LoDo (Lower Downtown) district, Ball Arena (home of the Colorado Avalanche, Denver Nuggets, and Colorado Mammoth), Coors Field (home of the Colorado Rockies), Denver's Downtown Aquarium, Elitch Gardens amusement park, and the Denver Botanic Gardens.

== Facilities ==
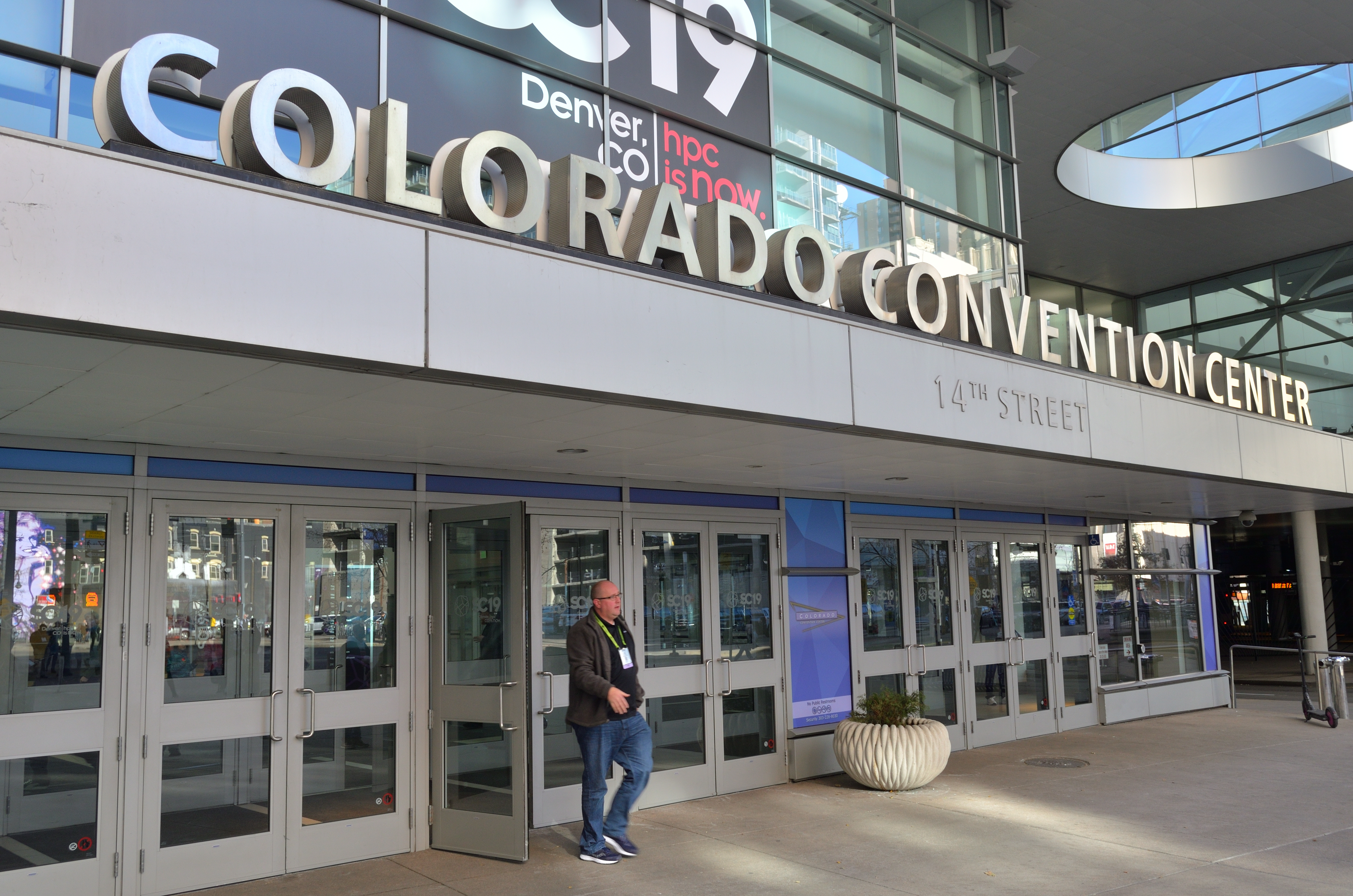
Main entrance of Colorado Convention Center

Exhibit Hall

The "Exhibit Hall" is the main facility at the convention center. The space consists of six individual halls spanning 90,000 to 100,000 square feet. The space is primarily used for trade shows, conventions and product launches.

Mile High Ballroom

The Mile High Ballroom can hold up to 5,452 people and features a state-of-the-art lighting system that provides the illusion of the night sky. The space is primarily used for banquets, conferences and intimate music events. The space was renovated in 2004 as part of the convention center's overall expansion plan. The venue's namesake derives from the Korbel Champagne Cellars.

Four Seasons Ballroom

The "Four Seasons Ballroom is the newest space, completed as part of the convention center's expansion plan. It has a maximum theater-oriented capacity of 3,472 people and is primarily used for banquets and fundraising events. It is home to numerous graduation ceremonies for Denver area schools including: Art Institute of Colorado, Community College of Denver, Metropolitan State University of Denver, Regis University and the University of Colorado Denver.

=== Frequent events ===
The CCC hosts hundreds of events each year from local community luncheons to national conventions. Some of the annual events include:

- Great American Beer Festival
- Outdoor Retailer
- Colorado Thespian Conference
- Colorado State Spelling Bee
- Graduation Ceremonies for Denver Public Schools, Auraria Campus Schools, Westwood College, The Art Institute of Colorado, University of Phoenix, and Regis University.
- Holiday Food and Gift Festival
- Denver Auto Show
- Denver Boat Show
- Denver Comic Con
- Colorado Prayer Luncheon
- Colorado Garden and Home Show
- Colorado Ski and Snow Sports Expo
- Salute to Seniors
- World Science Fiction Convention

== Bellco Theatre ==
Bellco Theatre
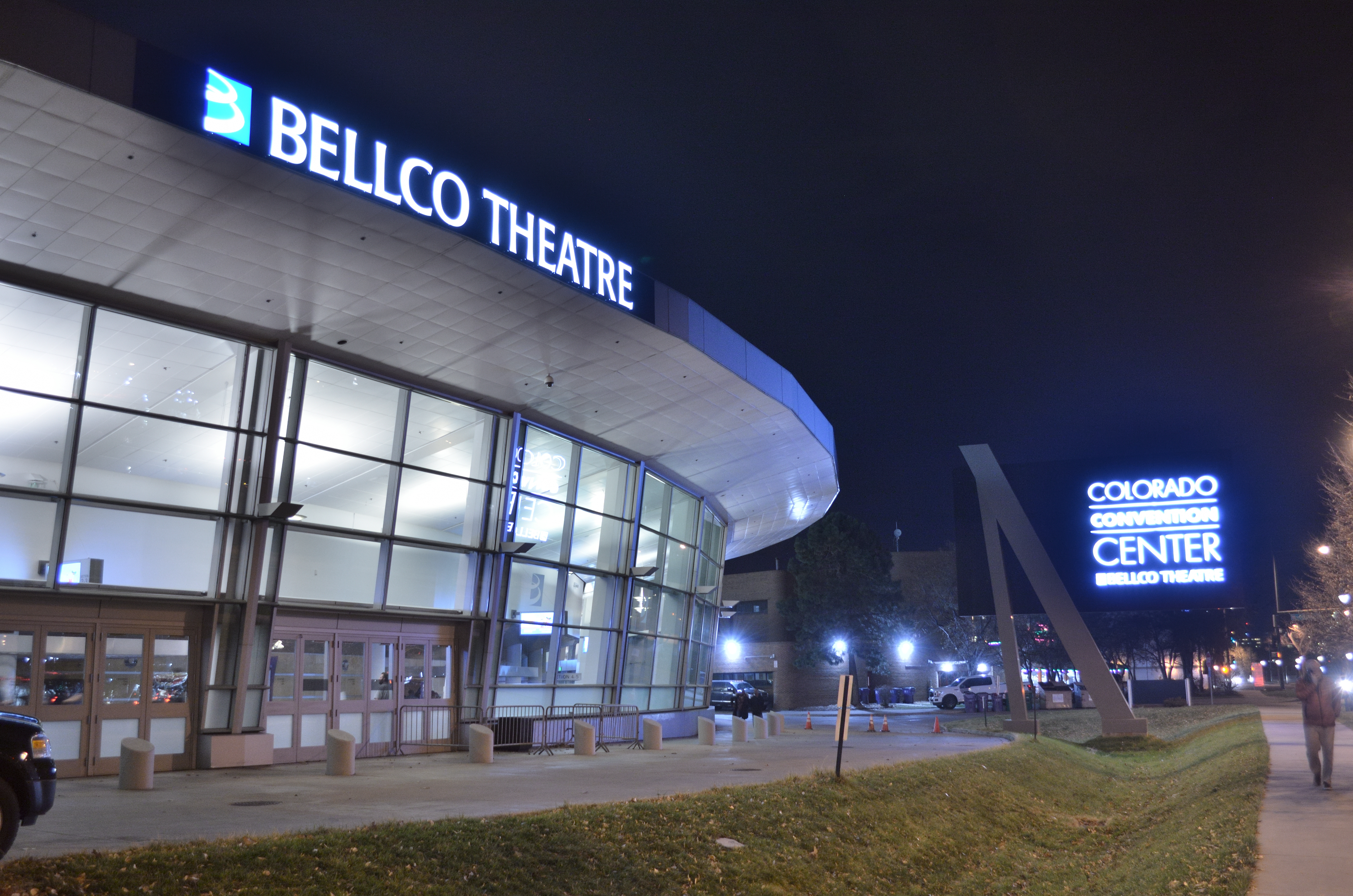
- Bellco Theatre night scene
- Interactive map of Bellco Theatre
- Former names: The Lecture Hall (2005-06); Wells Fargo Theatre (2007-12)
- Address: 700 14th St; Denver, CO 80202-3213
- Location: Downtown Denver
- Owner: City and County of Denver
- Operator: ASM Global
- Capacity: 5,000
- Type: Indoor amphitheatre

Construction
- Built: 2002-04
- Opened: March 1, 2005

Website
- Venue Website

The Bellco Theatre (formerly the Wells Fargo Theatre and The Lecture Hall) is an indoor amphitheatre located in the rear of the Colorado Convention Center. The venue opened March 1, 2005, with its first event by Ron White on March 5, 2005. The amphitheater was a part of the convention center's 2004 expansion plan. Originally known as The Lecture Hall, the venue was renamed in 2007 after banking and financial services company Wells Fargo. The bank purchased naming rights in September 2006 for nearly US$3 million, for a five-year period; beginning January 1, 2007. Beginning November 29, 2012, it was renamed from Wells Fargo Theatre after Bellco Credit Union, one of the largest credit unions in Colorado, purchased the naming rights in 2012.

Initially, the owner of the Paramount Theatre protested construction of the venue (along with the City Lights Pavilion) as he believed it would draw business away from the historic landmark. Since its opening, the venue has become one of the busiest mid-sized concert venues in Metro Denver, alongside the Fillmore Auditorium. It is primarily used for concerts desiring an "intimate" setting. The venue was named one of the "Top 100 Worldwide Theatres" by Pollstar in 2007 and 2011. The sculpture Indeterminate Line (2004) by Bernar Venet is located in front of the theatre.

=== Naming ===
- The Theater at the Colorado Convention Center (Planning/construction)
- The Lecture Hall (March 1, 2005—December 31, 2006)
- Wells Fargo Theatre (January 1, 2007—November 28, 2012)
- Bellco Theatre (November 29, 2012—Present)

=== Selected events ===
- Al Gore
- Alicia Keys
- Aziz Ansari
- Big Time Rush
- Bill Clinton
- Bruce Springsteen
- The Cheetah Girls
- Chelsea Handler
- Crosby, Stills and Nash
- Dane Cook
- David Archuleta
- David Gray
- David Spade
- Demi Lovato
- Diana Ross
- Dolly Parton
- Drake
- Drew Carey
- Elton John
- Gabriel Iglesias
- Gorillaz
- Il Divo
- Jamie Foxx
- Jason Mraz
- Janet Jackson
- Joe Bonamassa
- John Legend
- Jonas Brothers
- Katt Williams
- Lady Antebellum
- Mary J. Blige
- Melissa Etheridge
- Meghan Trainor
- Neil Young
- Nicki Minaj
- Peter Frampton
- Reba McEntire
- Rob Thomas
- Ron White
- Sting
- The Trailer Park Boys
- Trevor Noah
- Tori Amos
- Wheel of Fortune

== See also ==
- List of convention centers in the United States
