= Indeterminate Line =

Sculpture in Denver, Colorado, U.S.

- Artist: Bernar Venet
- Year: 2004
- Location: Denver, Colorado, U.S.
- 39.7414°N 104.9985°W

Indeterminate Line is a 1987 oxidized steel public art sculpture by Bernar Venet installed in Beverly Hills, California. A later 2004 Cor-ten steel version is installed outside Denver's Colorado Convention Center at Speer Boulevard, in the U.S. state of Colorado. It was installed at a cost of US$600,000. The 33-foot sculpture takes the form of a linear torqued circle.

Venet's related work, Two Indeterminate Lines (1993), consisting of two circular steel coils, is in the public art collection of the Massachusetts Institute of Technology.
