= I See What You Mean (Argent) =

Sculpture in Denver, Colorado, U.S.

- The sculpture in 2015
- Artist: Lawrence Argent
- Year: 2005
- Location: Denver, Colorado, U.S.
- 39.7436°N 104.9953°W

I See What You Mean, also known as the "Big Blue Bear", is a 40-foot-tall sculpture of a blue bear by Lawrence Argent, installed outside the Colorado Convention Center, in Denver. The piece was installed at a cost of US $424,400 and was immediately popular with both the public and art community.

== Background ==
Installed in 2005, I See What You Mean was installed outside of the Colorado Convention Center as a contribution to The Denver Public Art Program. Sculpted by artist Lawrence Argent, the structure is clad in polymer-concrete and depicts an American black bear standing on its hind legs, peering into the Convention Center's lobby.

Argent's decision to sculpt a bear was based on the wildlife native to the Rocky Mountains. The black bear is the only species of bear currently found in the mountain range, and is seen by many as a symbol of the region. Argent was inspired specifically by a newspaper photo of a bear peering through someone's window, which he stated "resonated with [him]."

The blue color, which has piqued the interest of tourists and Denver citizens alike, was not Argent's original intent. The plan was for the bear to reflect natural colors of the region, such as sandstone, but a mockup of the sculpture was printed in blue and he felt that it was more striking than the original.
