= Lawrence Argent =

- Born: January 24, 1957; Essex, England
- Died: October 4, 2017 (aged 60); Denver, Colorado
- Education: Royal Melbourne Institute of Technology in Australia, Maryland Institute, College of Art

Lawrence Argent (January 24, 1957 – October 4, 2017) was a visual artist best known for his 2004 public artwork I See What You Mean at the Colorado Convention Center in Denver.

== Early life ==
Argent was born on January 24, 1957, in Essex, England, and grew up in Australia. He studied art at the Royal Melbourne Institute of Technology in Australia, and received his MFA in 1986, from the Rinehart School of Sculpture at the Maryland Institute, College of Art, in Baltimore, Maryland.

== Career ==
Argent accepted a teaching position at the University of Denver School of Art and Art History in 1993; he was named as a professor emeritus in 2017.

Argent was at the forefront of a movement known as digital sculpting, using "computer-aided design software to create sculptures with once-impractical whorls, warps, swirls and bends."

Argent died of cardiac arrest on October 4, 2017.

== Selected works ==
- Cojones (1999)
- Library of Applause (1994)
- Whispers (2002) at the Ritchie Center, in Denver, Colorado
- I See What You Mean (2004), in Denver, Colorado
- Leap (2011) at the Sacramento International Airport, in Sacramento, California
- Flowing Kiss (2013), in Columbus, Ohio
- I am here (2014), in Chengdu, China
- Venus (2017), in San Francisco, California
