= North Bank Park =

Park in Columbus, Ohio, U.S.

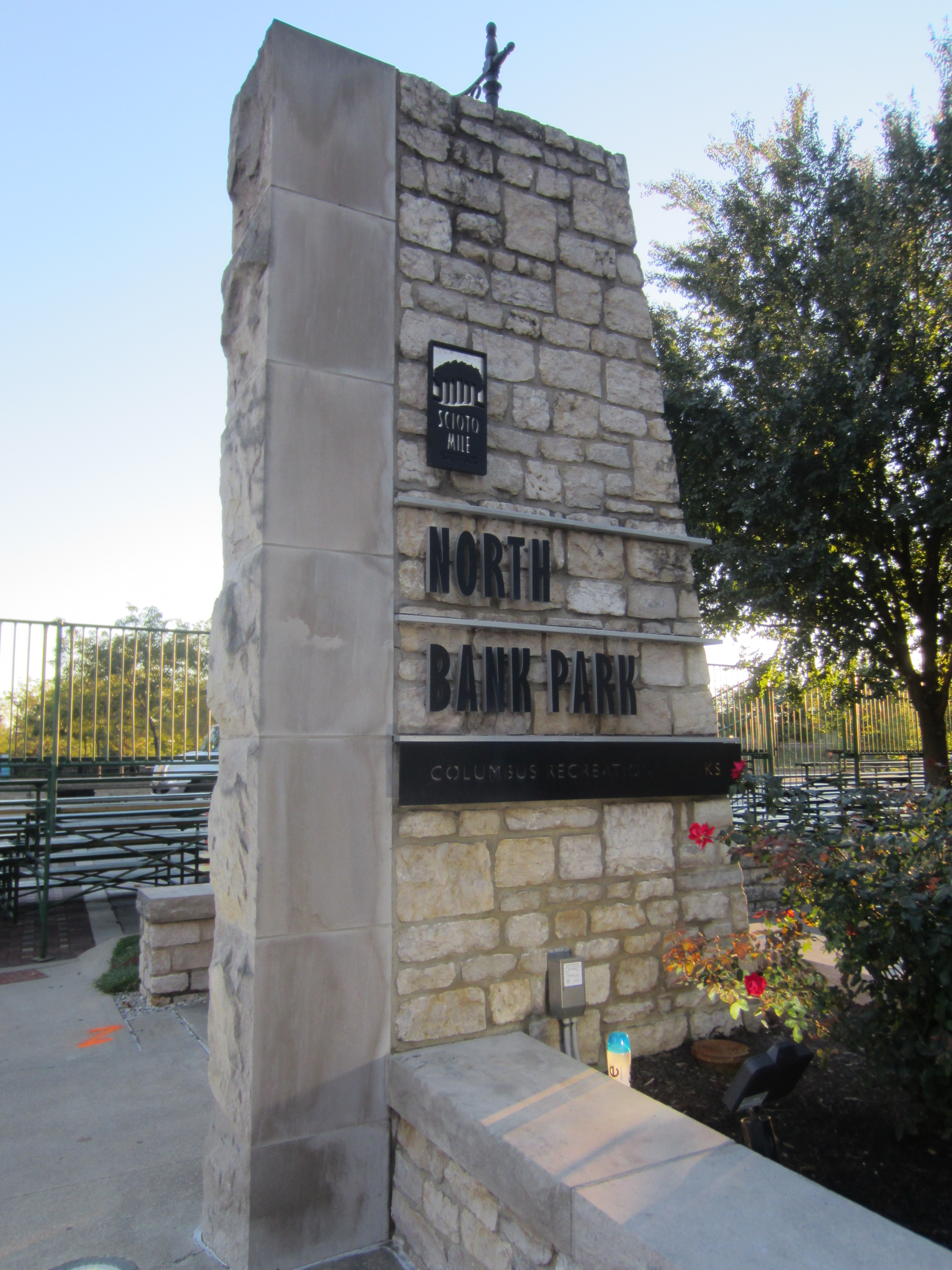
- Park sign
- Interactive map of North Bank Park
- Coordinates: 39°57′55″N 83°00′35″W
- Administrator: Columbus Recreation and Parks Department
- Public transit: 3, 4, 5, 7, 8, 11; CoGo
- Website: Official website

North Bank Park is an 11-acre (4.5 ha) park in downtown Columbus, Ohio, United States. The park includes a work of art, Flowing Kiss, installed in 2013.

== History ==
Ground broke on July 24, 2003, and the park was dedicated on July 16, 2005. Construction cost approximately $15 million.

== See also ==
- List of parks in Columbus, Ohio
