= Scioto Audubon Metro Park =

Park and nature preserve in Columbus, Ohio, U.S.

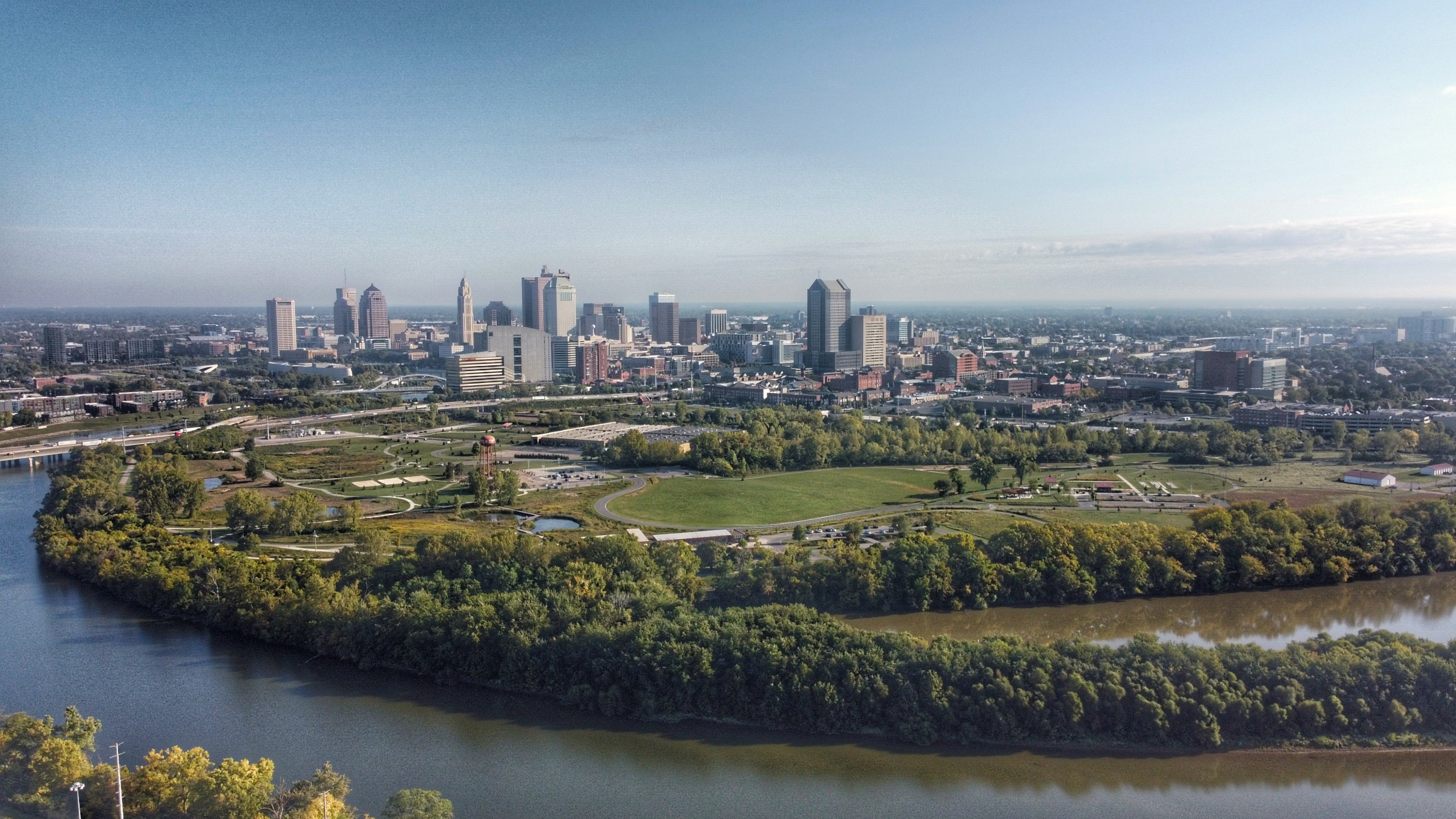
- Aerial view of the park amid Downtown Columbus
- Interactive map of Scioto Audubon Metro Park
- Location: 400 W. Whittier St, Columbus, Ohio
- Coordinates: 39°56′57″N 83°00′32″W
- Area: 120 acres (49 ha)
- Opened: 2009
- Owner: City of Columbus
- Administrator: Columbus and Franklin County Metro Parks
- Visitors: about 800,000 annually
- Parking: Multiple lots
- Public transit: 8 CoGo
- Website: Official website

Scioto Audubon Metro Park is a public park and nature preserve in Columbus, Ohio. The park is managed by the Columbus and Franklin County Metro Parks and is part of the Scioto Mile network of parks and trails around Downtown Columbus. The park features numerous trails, wetlands, rock climbing, volleyball and bocce courts, and numerous other amenities. At the western edge is the Grange Insurance Audubon Center, considered the first nature center built in close proximity to a downtown area.

The site was formerly industrial and required extensive remediation. Planning began in 2003, and the park opened in 2009 with 94 acres (38 ha), later expanded to 120 acres.

== Attributes ==
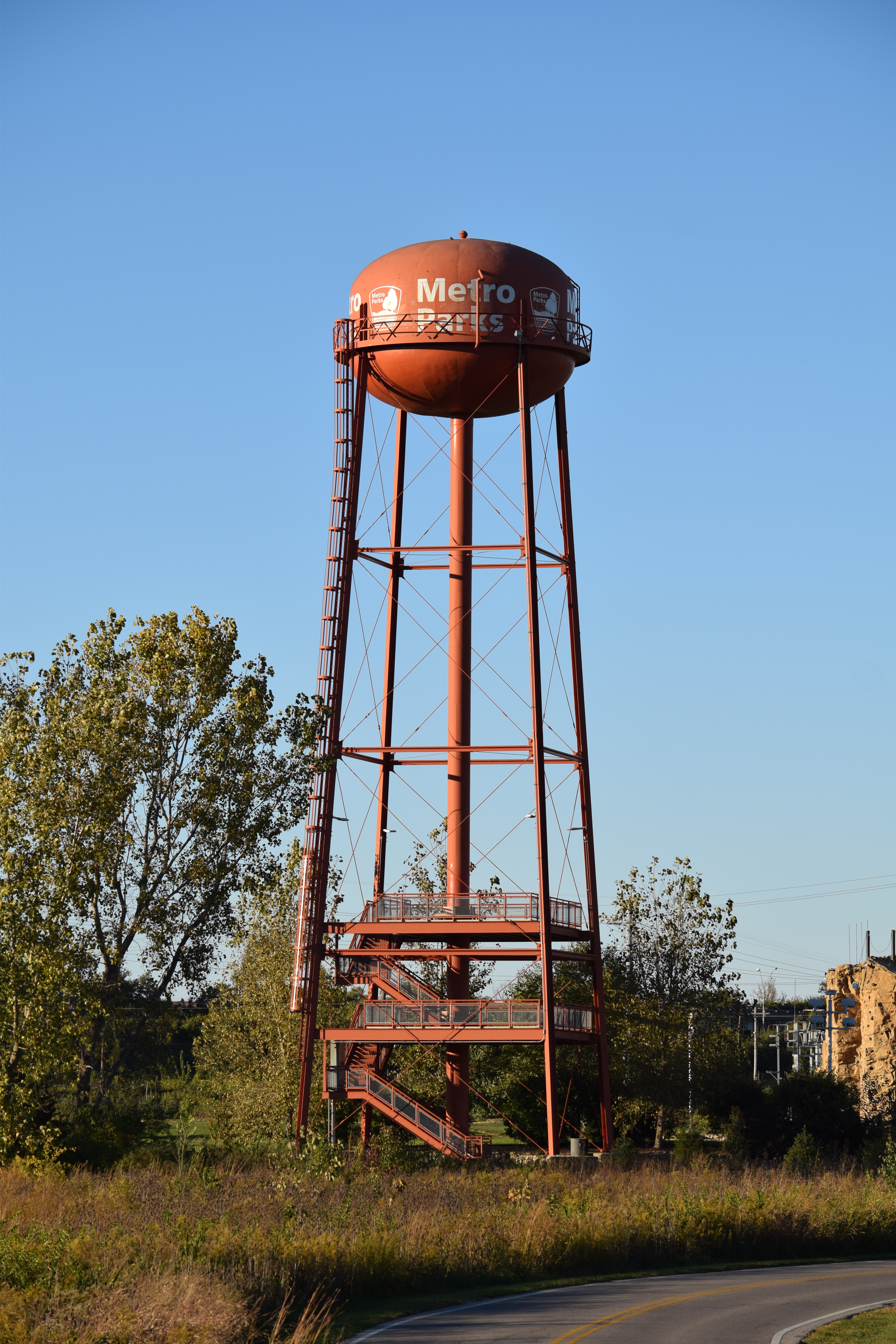
Water tower and observation platforms

The park among others in the Scioto Mile park network.

Scioto Audubon Metro Park is located on Columbus's Whittier Peninsula. It borders the Brewery District to the east, Interstate 71 and the Scioto River to the north and west, and downtown to the northeast, and it is partially isolated by railroad tracks. The park is a 10-minute walk from downtown and gives views of the city skyline. It was designed by MKSK, an urban planning and landscape architecture company that has made many Columbus-area works, including the Scioto Mile.

Specific features include a central activity area, with a climbing wall, water tower with two observation platforms, and three sand volleyball courts. The park also has a 2.5-acre (1.0 ha) dog park, an obstacle course with nine stations, and seven small wetlands of about 5 acres (2.0 ha) total. Nearby are recreation fields, a sledding hill, butterfly garden, bocce courts, a park office and visitor center, a boat ramp, fishing docks, and a maintenance area. The park includes multiple restrooms, picnic tables, grills, and parking lots. The nearby Greenlawn Avenue dam widens the river into a slack water lake, attractive to migrating birds. Thousands of birds utilize the area during spring migrations, including over 200 species. The park is an Important Bird Area, named by Audubon and BirdLife International. The Columbus Rotary Obstacle Course has an 8-foot wall, cargo rope climb, balance beams, monkey bars, a tunnel crawl, and a belly crawl. The park features four trails: the Hermit Thrush Trail has 0.125 miles through forest, the Columbus Rotary Running Track is 0.5 miles, and the Wetland Trail is 0.4 miles. The longest is the Scioto Greenway Trail, which runs through the park for about 2 miles. It also connects north to the Olentangy Trail, which runs 14 miles to Worthington.

The Metro Park climbing wall is 35 ft (11 m) high, made of fiberglass, with three towers and two arches. The 6,100 sq ft (570 m^{2}) structure is considered the largest free outdoor climbing wall in the United States. The wall can handle up to 20 climbers at a time, and can be used for bouldering as well as lead and top-rope climbing. Although access to the wall is free, climbers are required to bring their own gear.

The butterfly garden, planted in 2016, has seven raised mounds and a wide variety of plants aimed to attract 40 different butterfly species, as well as bees, wasps, and beetles. The plants include shrubs, annuals, grass, milkweed and perennials. The garden is considered the largest butterfly garden in the Metro Parks system.

Scioto Audubon Metro Park operates year-round, with varying hours in different seasons. 2014 attendance was over 800,000, beyond the park attendance expected by the Metro Parks director.

=== Audubon Center ===
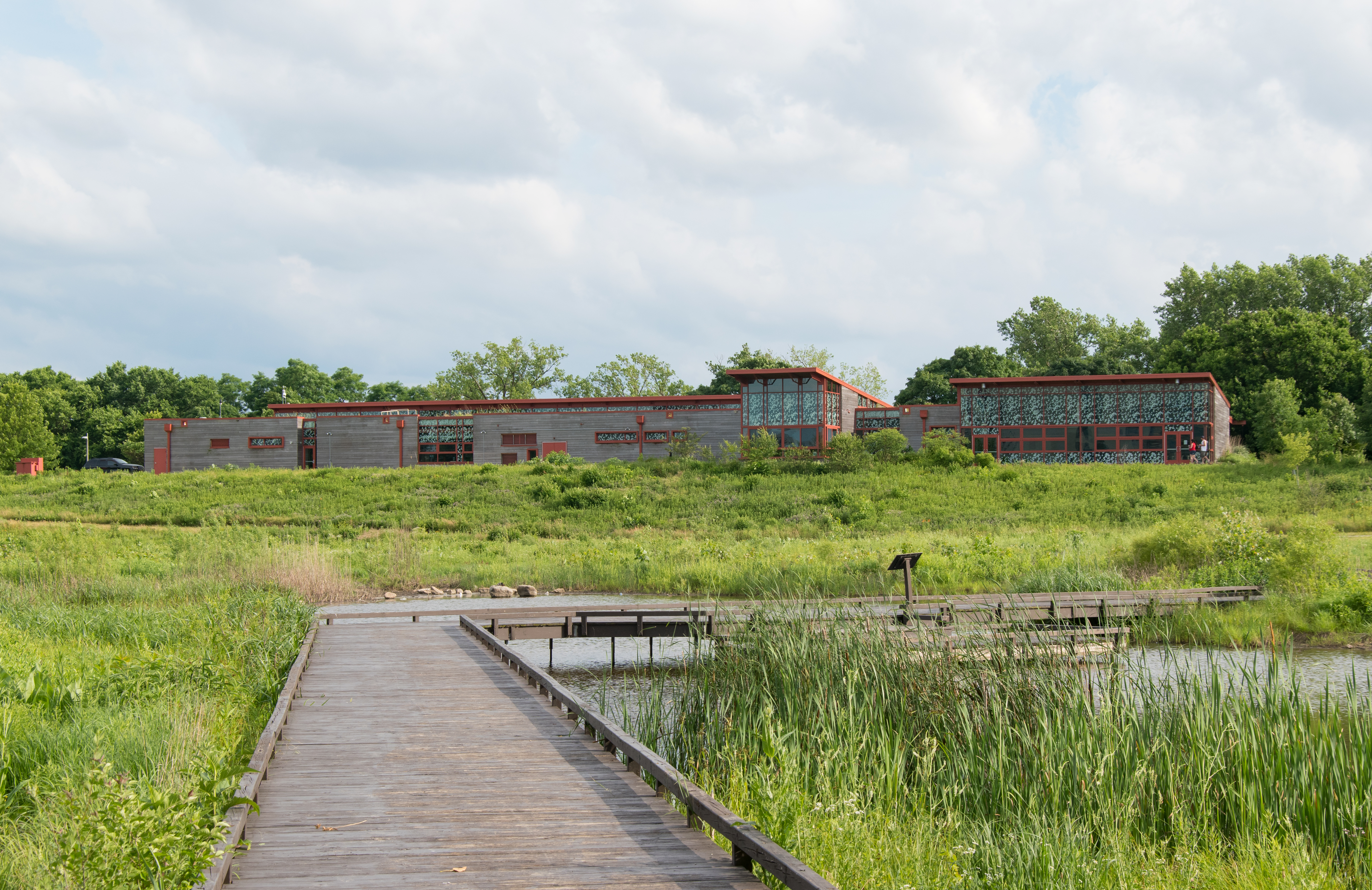
The Grange Insurance Audubon Center

The Grange Insurance Audubon Center is located near the western edge of the park, at 505 W. Whittier St. The 18,000 sq ft (1,700 m^{2}) building is the first Audubon center built in close proximity to a downtown area. It was built along with the park, opening in August 2009 at a cost of $14.5 million. It is managed by Audubon Ohio, and is one of about 50 of their centers in the United States. It includes classrooms, a library, 200-seat auditorium, demonstration gardens, and an observation room for birding. The building, designed by DesignGroup, was made to be environmentally-friendly. It uses a passive solar design, native plants on its green roof, and it maximizes natural light, uses geothermal heating, and has gutters leading to bioswales, filtering debris and pollution out of runoff. It has a LEED Gold rating from the U.S. Green Building Council.

Originally, Audubon planned to spend $8 million on the facility. Philip Urban, then CEO of Grange Insurance, was looking for an iconic way for his company to commemorate 75 years in business. The company agreed to purchase the facility's naming rights for $4 million. Urban then formed a fundraising committee and convinced corporations and individuals to contribute, raising the total funds to $14.5 million.

=== Important Bird Area ===
The Scioto Audubon makes up part of the Scioto River-Greenlawn Important Bird Area, a three-mile riparian corridor in the city. The area also includes the 360-acre Green Lawn Cemetery and the Lou Berliner Sports Park. The corridor has had more recorded bird species than any other stretch of the Scioto, numbering 212 species.

Species include the northern pintail, pied-billed grebe, American bittern, osprey, at least ten species of gulls and terns, the prothonotary warbler, northern waterthrush, peregrine falcons, bald eagles, cliff swallows, red-shouldered hawks, red-headed woodpeckers, and the yellow-crowned night heron.

=== Neighboring features ===
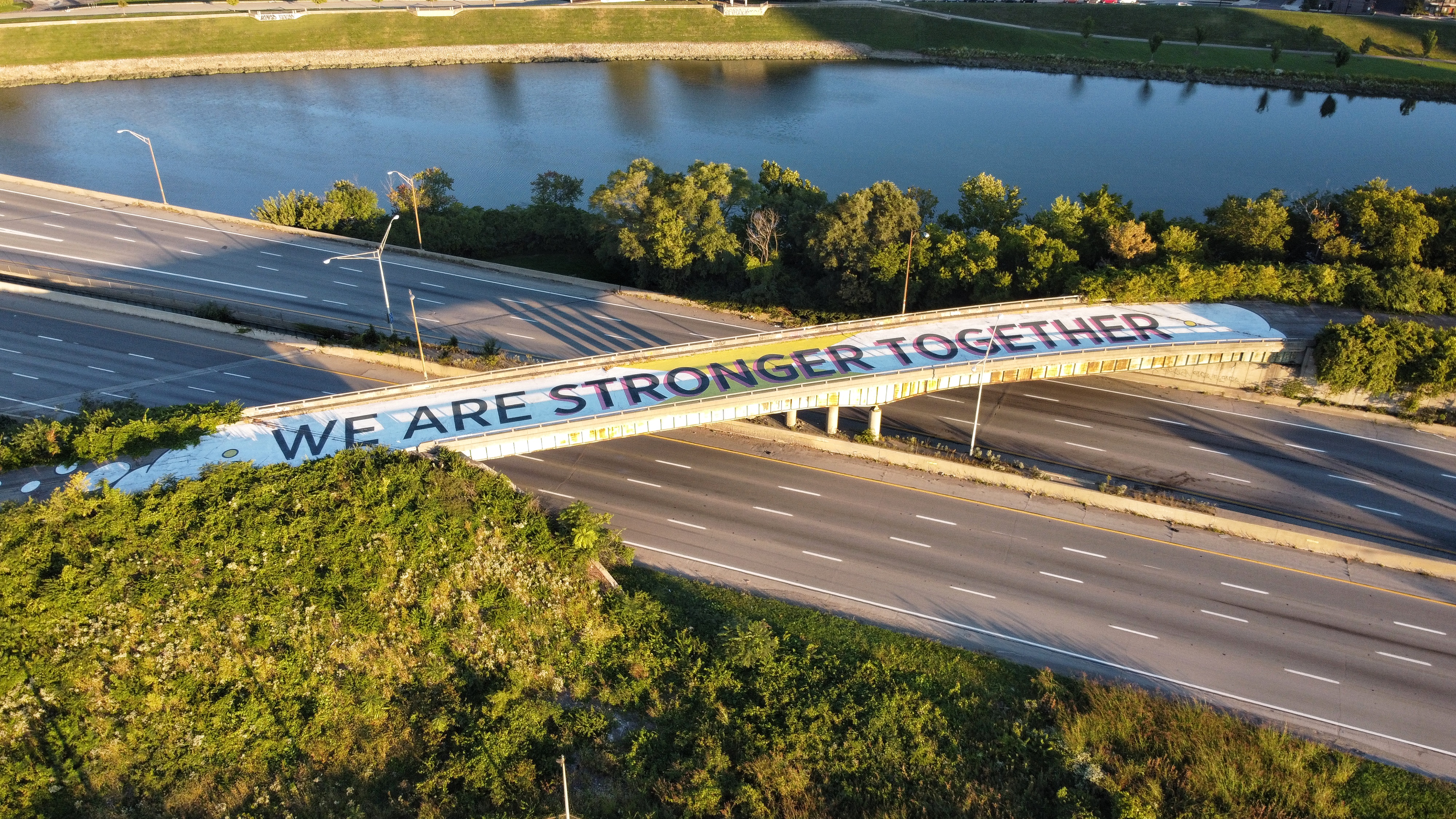
The I-70/I-71 overpass in 2020

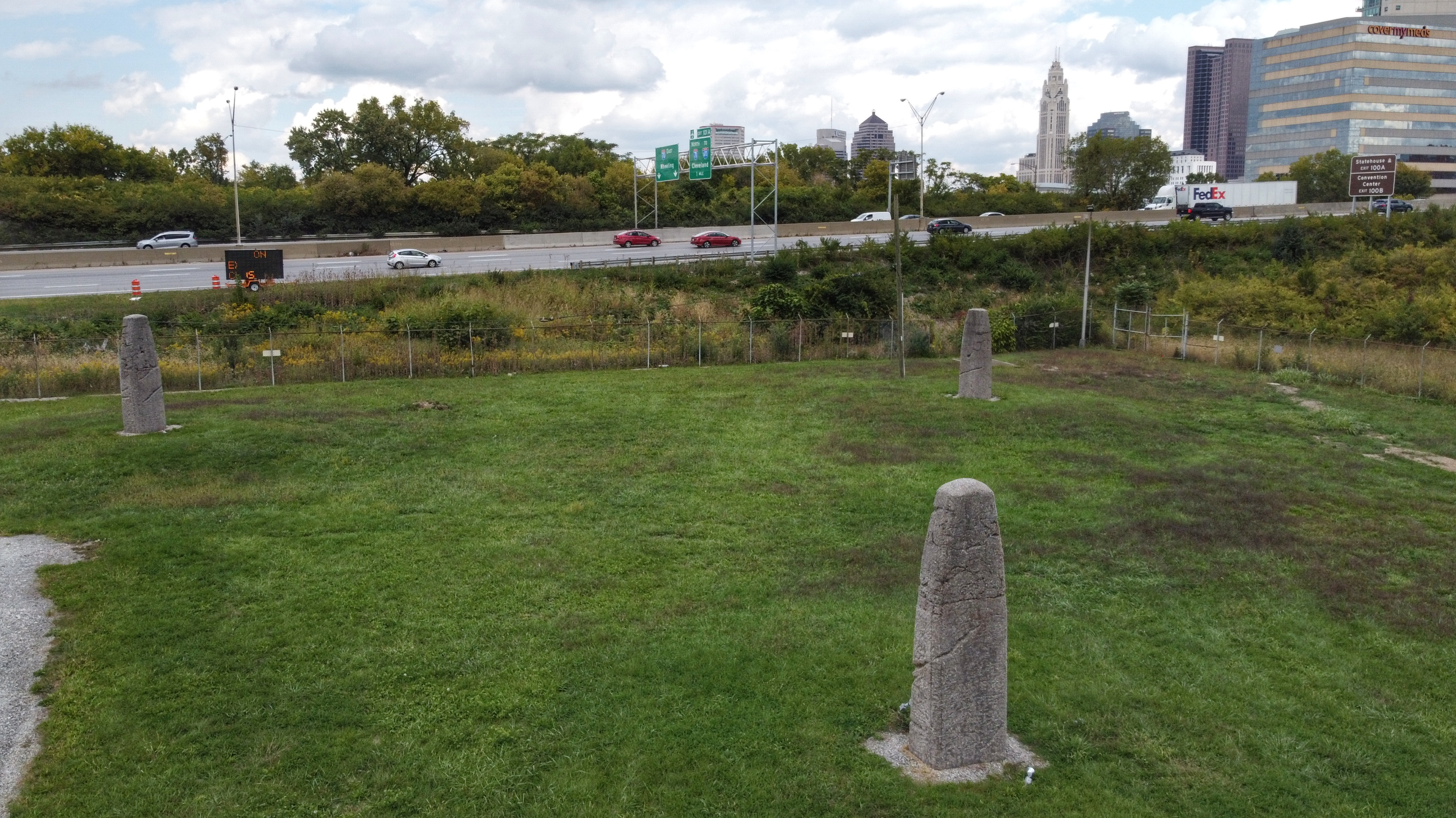
Needles of Stone

Branching out of the park is an abandoned overpass, spanning over the nearby Interstates 70 and 71. In 2020, a 400-foot mural was painted on its roadbed, reading "We are stronger together", in reference to the ongoing COVID-19 pandemic.

The park borders the Furnace Street Substation, an electrical substation noted for containing three 16-ft-tall stone monoliths evocative of Stonehenge. The monoliths, known as Needles of Stone or Pillars of Stone, were installed in 1989, the year the substation opened. They were commissioned by the Columbus Division of Power, which paid Ohio State University landscape architecture students to design a work to bring attention to the facility and spur curiosity, especially given its prominent visibility from I-70 and I-71. The works were constructed by city staff. The works are separated from the park by a fence, separating them from public view by about 100 feet (30 m).

== History ==
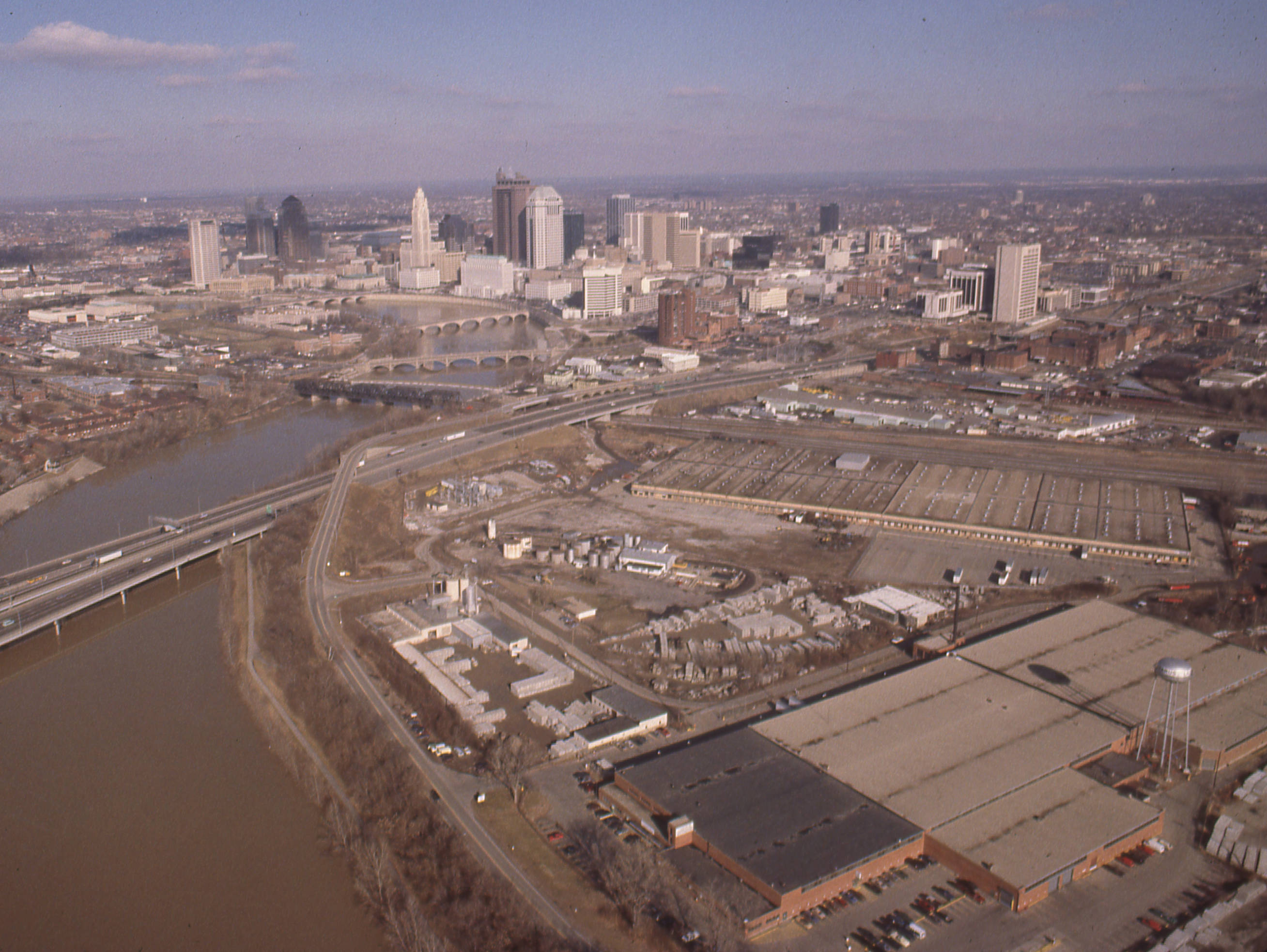
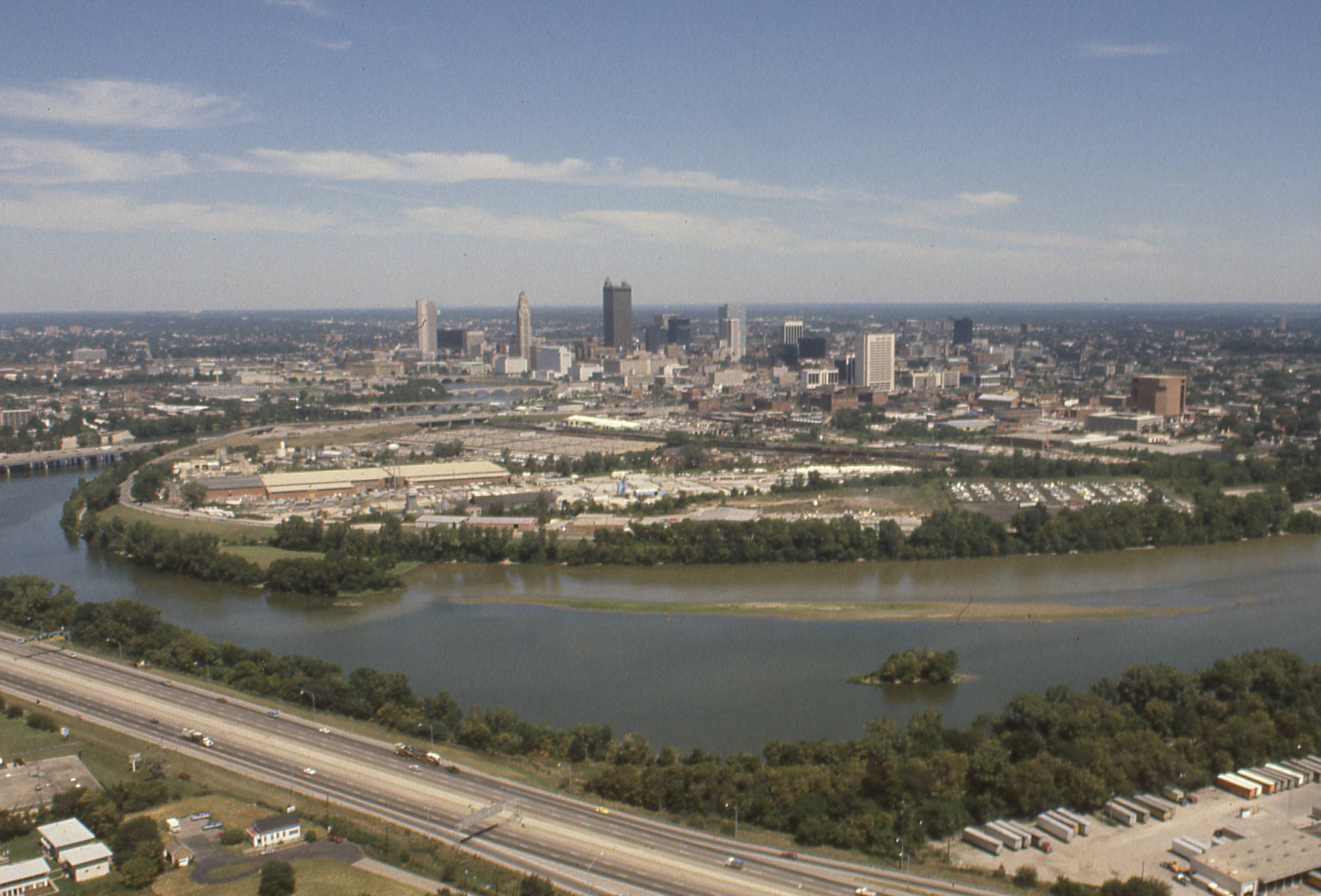
The Whittier Peninsula in the 1980s

The entire Whittier Peninsula was once home to factories, rail yards, warehouses, and impound lots, and it became an industrial brownfield site. In the early 2000s, Columbus looked to redeveloping its riverfront, as many other cities were at the time. The Whittier Peninsula was proposed to be used for ballparks or an amphitheater. Conservationists helped push for the current park, as the site was being used for birdwatching even then. A three-mile area along the Scioto River still retained its forest and had been recently designated an Important Bird Area. In 2003, Columbus Metro Parks, the Columbus Recreation and Parks Department, and Audubon Ohio signed an agreement to create the park. The city had to remove old buildings and underground storage tanks and pay for soil remediation. Lead and arsenic were concerning, but the five acres around the Audubon center site were not of concern given low levels and contaminants buried deep enough.

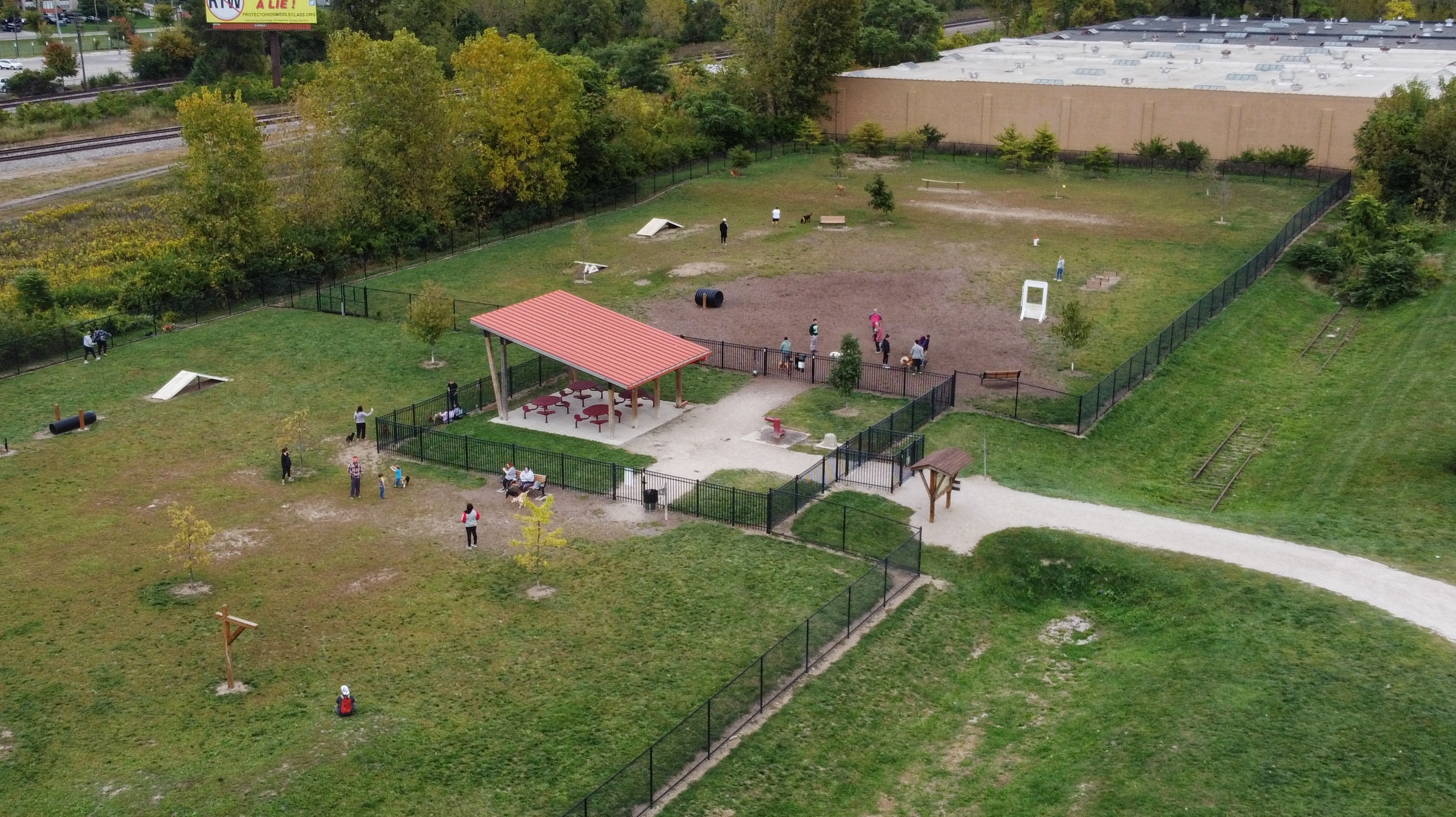
Current dog park on-site

The park opened August 28, 2009, at a cost of $14 million, including $11 million to purchase the land and clean up contamination. The park's obstacle course opened in 2013. In 2015 and 2016, the park was home to the annual American Birding Expo, hosted by Bird Watcher's Digest.

A new dog park is slated to be constructed near the park entrance in 2021. The Ohio Department of Transportation requires space while it reconstructs portions of Interstates 70 and 71, and will purchase the site of the current dog park, which opened in 2012. The new park will have 0.75 acres (0.30 ha), smaller than the current 2.5-acre (1.0 ha) dog park.

== Gallery ==
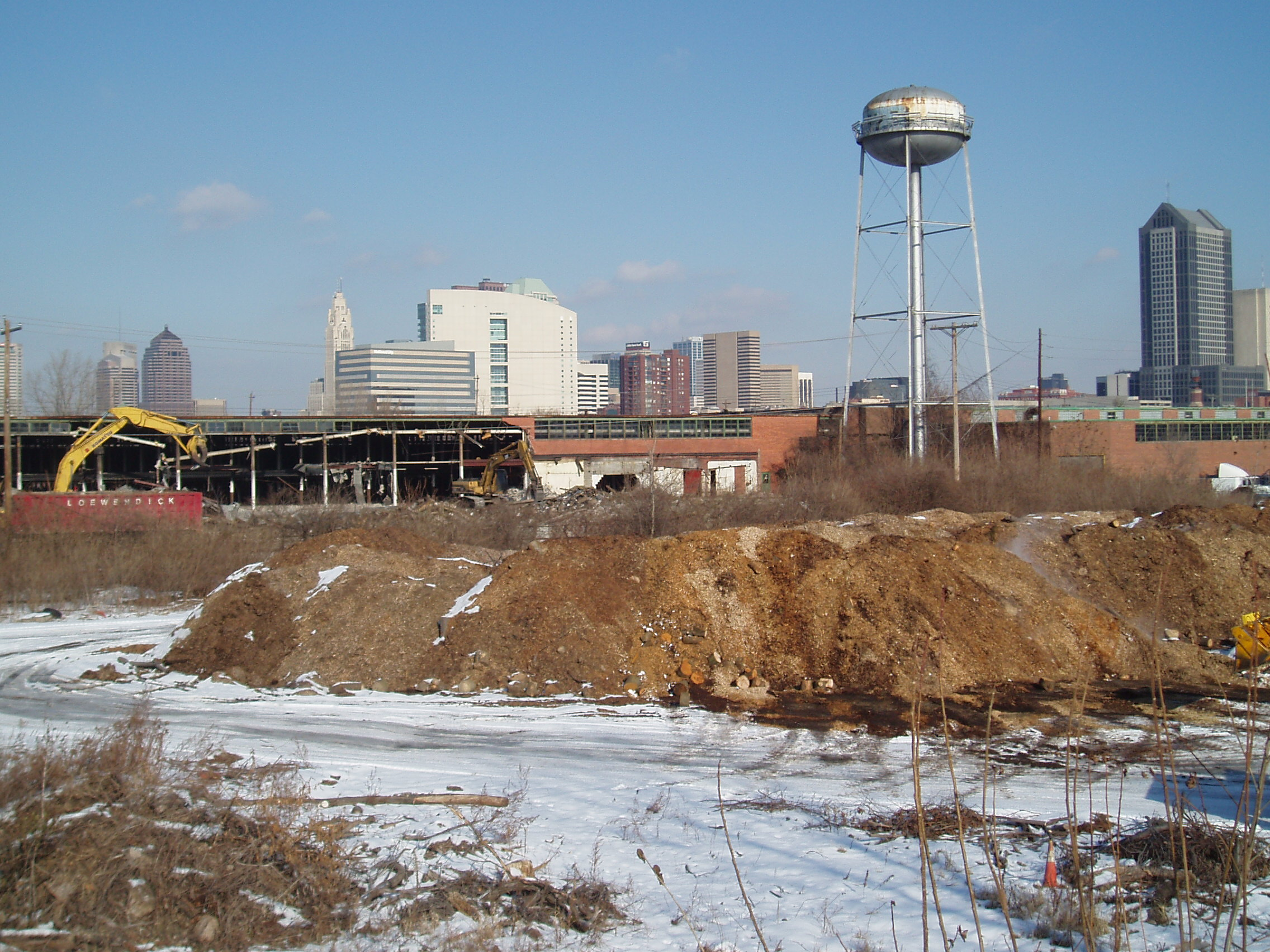
Site during redevelopment, c. 2010

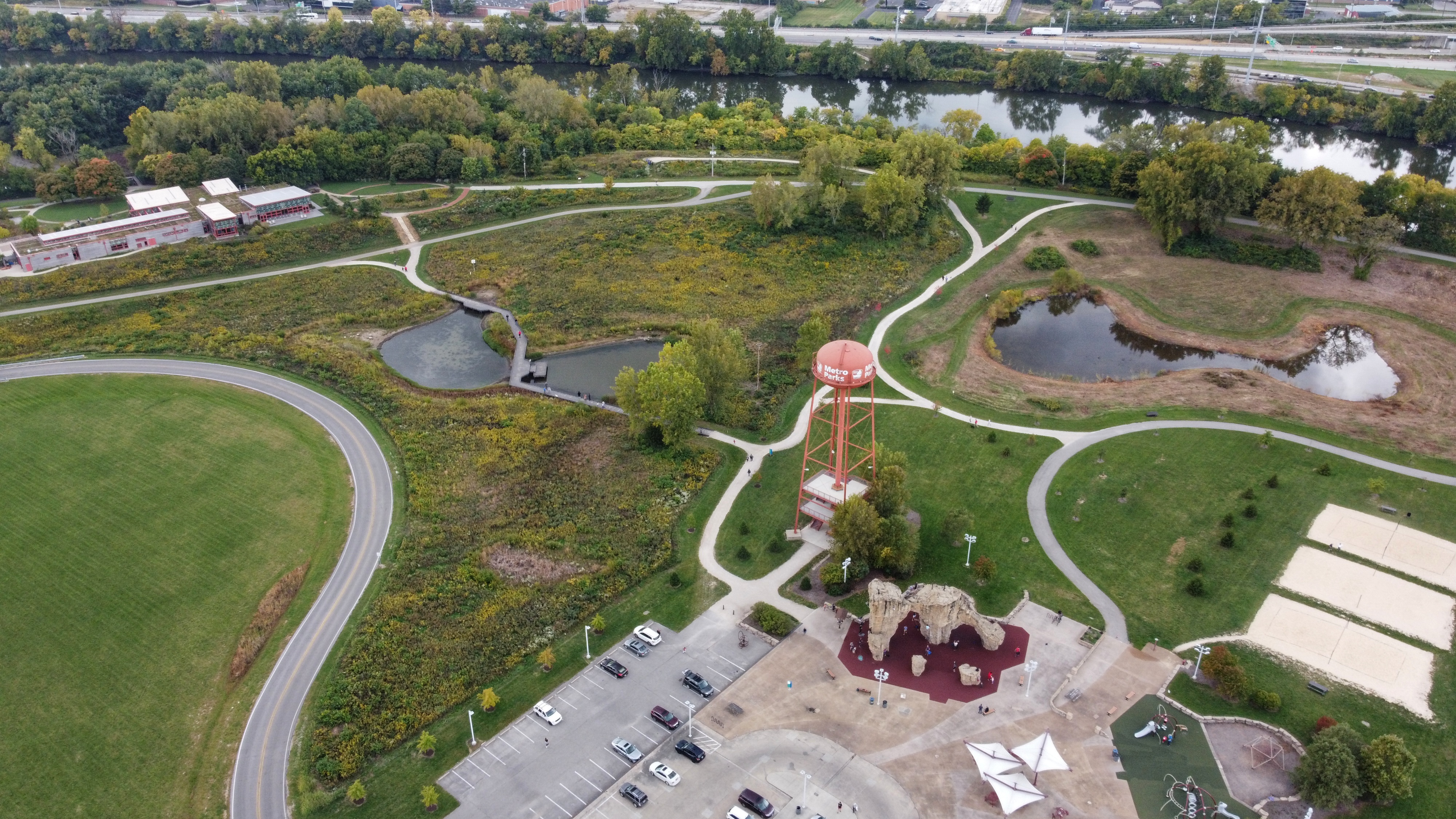
Central activity area and restored wetlands

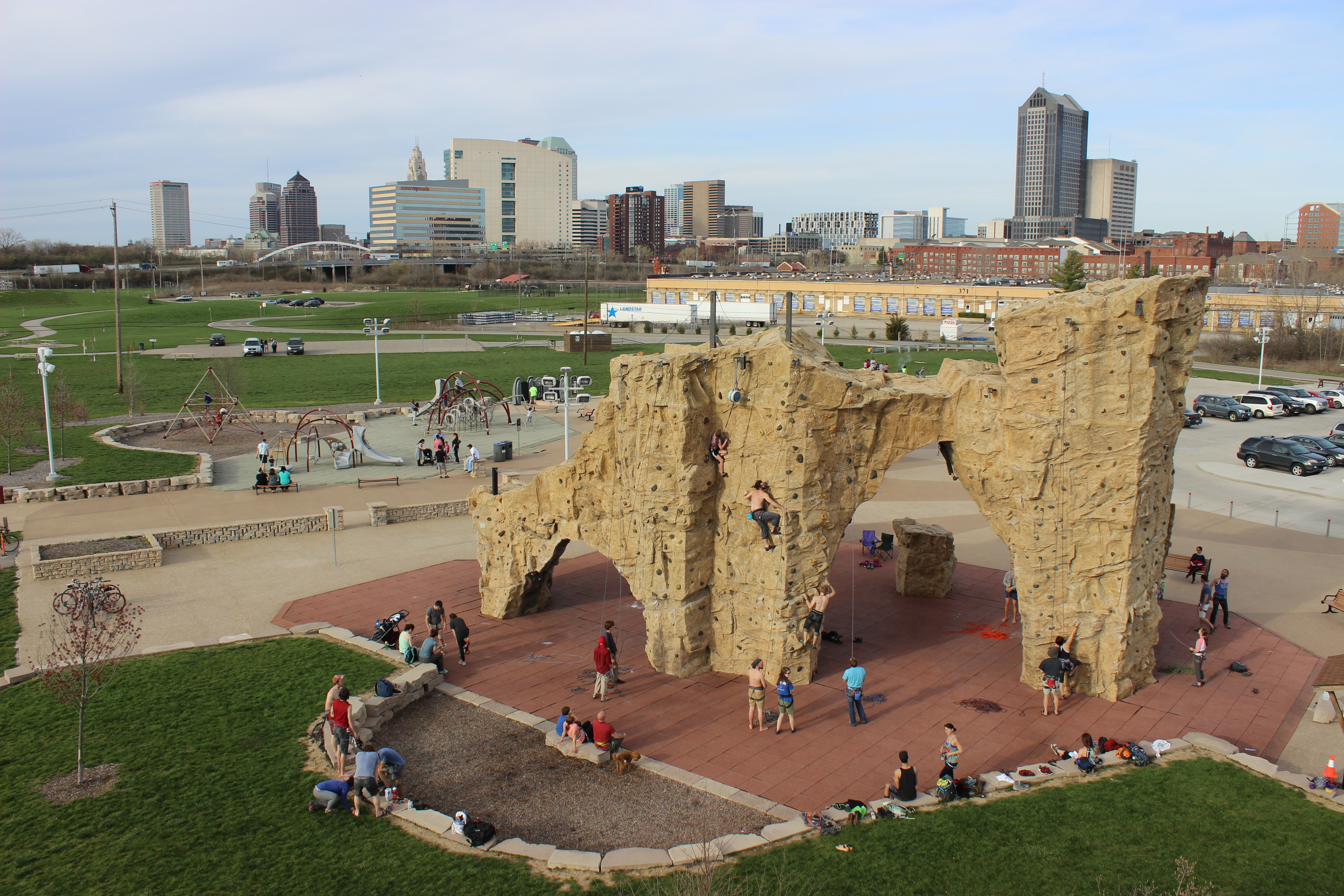
Rock wall

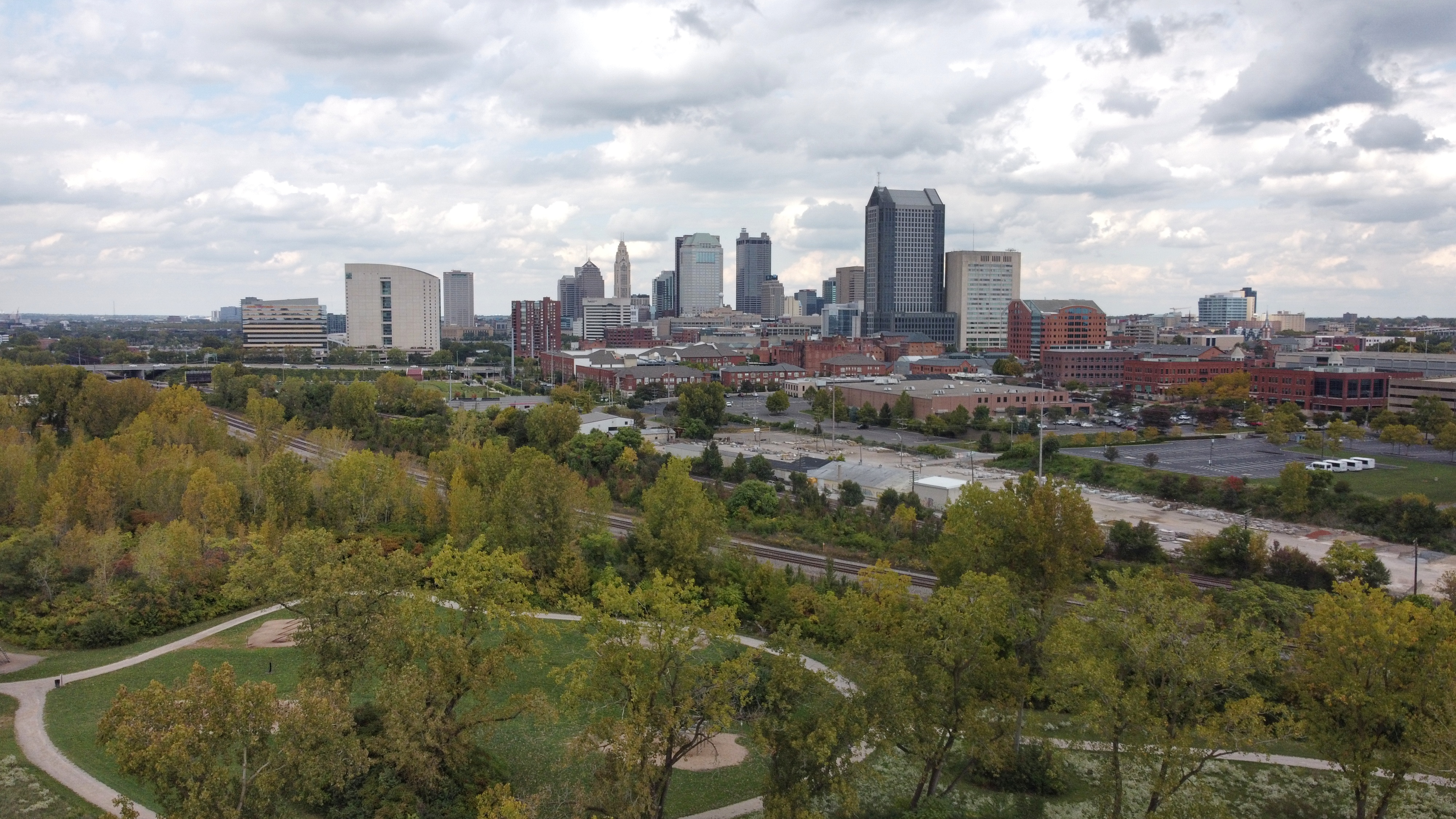
City view

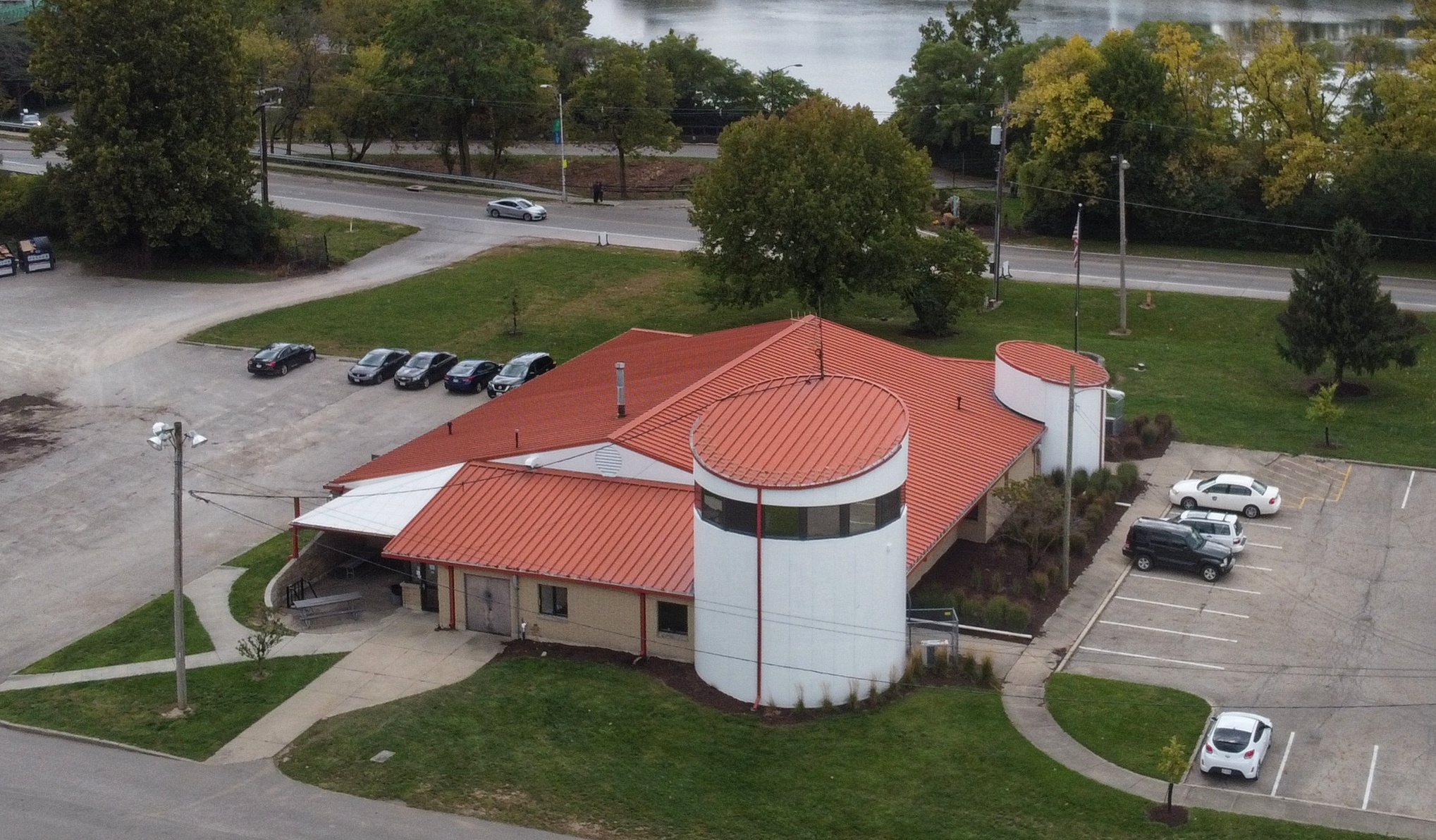
Park office

== See also ==
- List of parks in Columbus, Ohio
