= List of public art in Denver =

Coordinates: 39.7392°N 104.9850°W

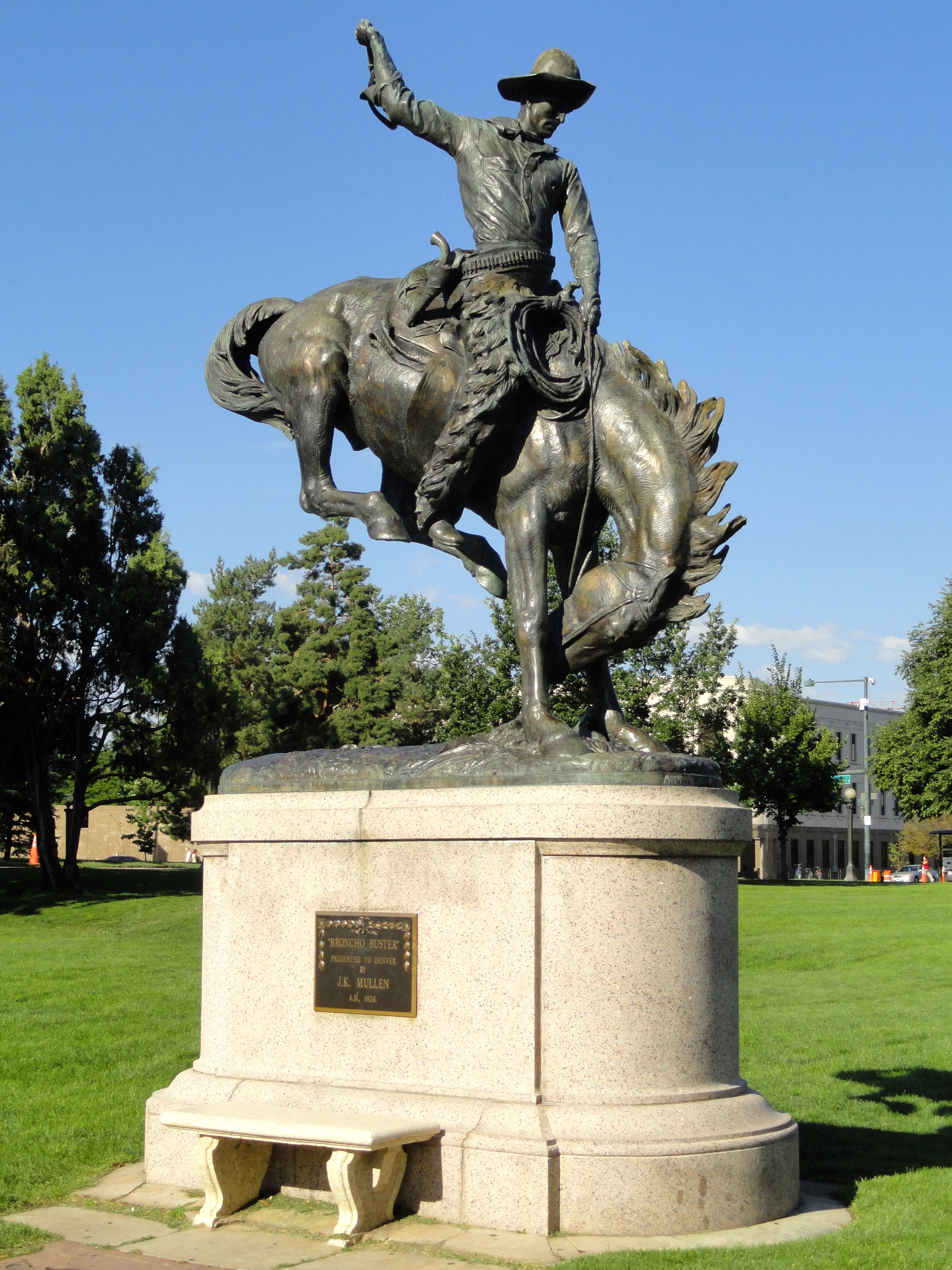
Bronco Buster

Thatcher Memorial Fountain

Public artworks that have been displayed in Denver, Colorado, include:

- 1.26
- Armenian Khachkar, Colorado State Capitol
- Articulated Wall
- Balloon Man Running
- Big Sweep
- Blue Mustang, Denver International Airport
- Bridge
- Bronco Buster
- Civil War Monument, also known as Civil War Memorial, Civil War Monument, Civil War Soldier, and Soldier's Monument
- The Closing Era, Colorado State Capitol
- Colorado Tribute to Veterans Monument, Colorado State Capitol
- Confluence Park Marker
- Dancers
- Elizabeth Allen Sopris Memorial
- For Jennifer
- The Garrison Frieze
- Homage to the Pioneer
- I Have a Dream
- I Know You Know That I Know
- I See What You Mean, Colorado Convention Center
- Indeterminate Line
- Iridescent Cloud
- Liberty Bell, Colorado State Capitol
- The Meeting Place
- National Velvet
- The Old Prospector
- On the War Trail
- Pioneer Fountain, also known as Pioneer Monument
- The Player
- The Red Forest
- Robert Burns Memorial
- Scottish Angus Cow and Calf
- Shadow Array
- Soft Landing
- Statue of Christopher Columbus
- Statue of Jack Swigert, Denver International Airport
- Statue of Joe P. Martínez, Colorado State Capitol
- Sun Silo
- Thatcher Memorial Fountain
- Tribute to Elrey Jeppesen
- Un Corrido Para la Gente
- Veterans Memorial
- Voorhies Memorial
- Wheel
- William Jackson Palmer Plaque
- The Yearling (1993)

== See also ==
- Burns Park Sculpture Garden
- Statue of Martin Luther King Jr. (Pueblo, Colorado), formerly installed in Denver's City Park
