= National Velvet (disambiguation) =

National Velvet is a novel by Enid Bagnold.

National Velvet can also refer to:

- National Velvet (film), a film adaptation starring Elizabeth Taylor
- National Velvet (TV series), a TV adaptation
- National Velvet (band), a 1980s Canadian rock band
- National Velvet (McEnroe), a sculpture by John McEnroe
