= George Floyd protests in Colorado =

2020 civil unrest after the murder of George Floyd

- Part of George Floyd protests
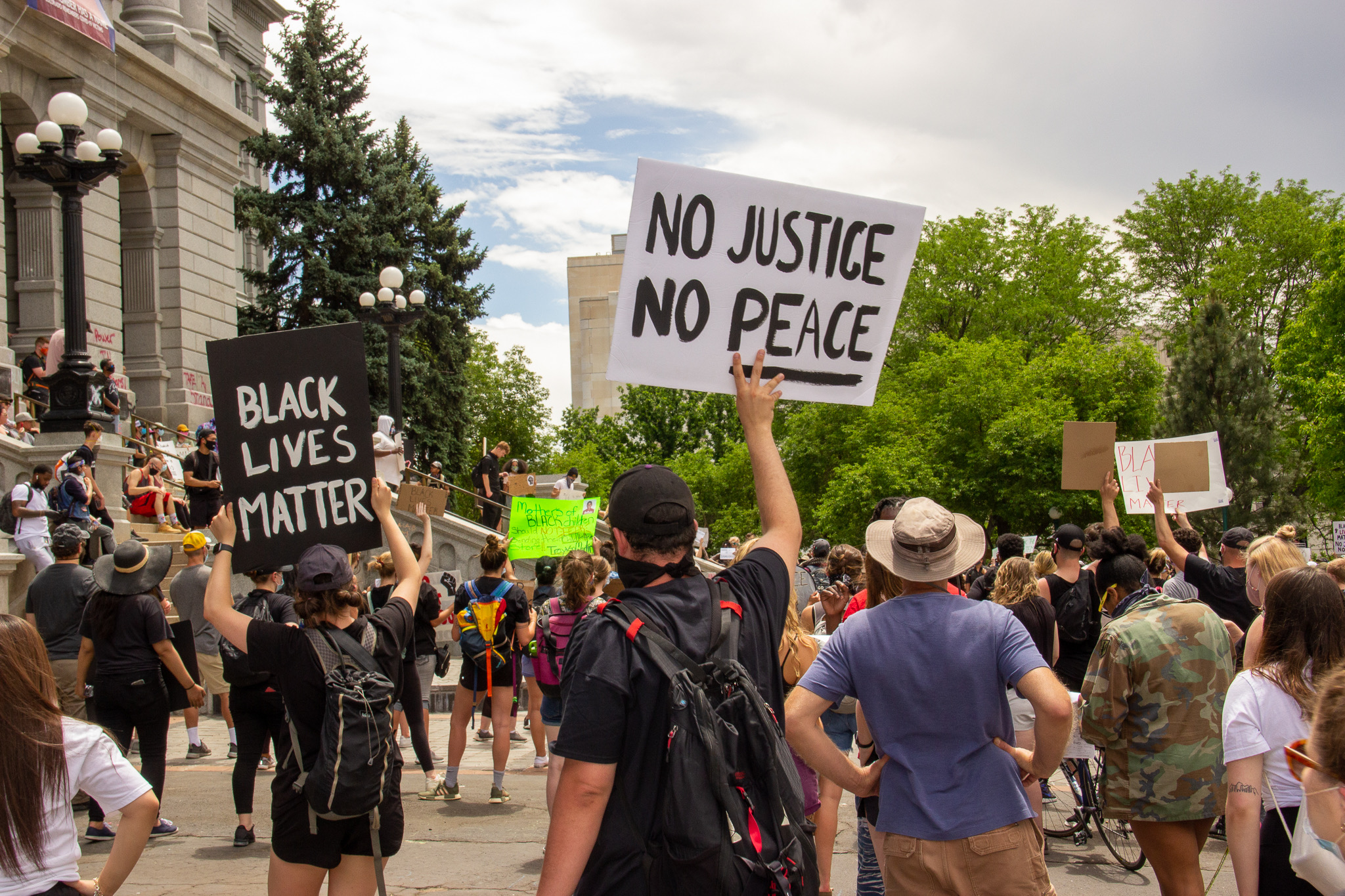
- Protest at Colorado State Capitol, Denver on May 31
- Date: May 28 – October 2020 (4 months and 3 days)
- Location: Colorado, United States
- Caused by: Police brutality; Institutional racism against African Americans; Reaction to the murder of George Floyd; Economic, racial and social inequality

Casualties
- Deaths: 1

Cities in Colorado in which a protest with about 100 or more participants was held

This is a list of George Floyd protests in Colorado, United States.

== Locations ==
=== Alamosa ===
On June 4, 2020, a protest was held in downtown Alamosa. While the protest was peaceful, before 6 p.m., a man shot someone in a truck, wounding him. The truck later stopped in the middle of the intersection. The suspect, a 27-year-old defense attorney, was a protester.

=== Aspen ===
Dozens of residents attended a candle-light vigil on May 30. Participants repeated the words "I can't breathe" for nine minutes, the length of time that Derek Chauvin's knee was on George Floyd's neck.

On June 3, more than 100 protesters gathered at Gondola Plaza for a demonstration organized by local high school students and an Aspen area ballet dancer.

=== Aurora ===
On June 2, Interim Police Chief Vanessa Wilson marched with community members to Aurora's Municipal Center, where they knelt for eight minutes and 46 seconds during a peaceful protest against police brutality.

On June 27, the Denver chapter of the Party for Socialism and Liberation organized a gathering at the Aurora Municipal Center. The group proceeded to block traffic on I-225, shutting it down. A second, student-led rally began shortly after, shutting down the intersection of Alameda and Chambers. After both protests, agitators continued to disrupt, specifically targeting Aurora police.

On July 3, the Party for Socialism and Liberation again organized a gathering which drew hundreds to the intersection of Billings Street and Evergreen Avenue, directly outside the Aurora Police Department District 1 building. The protesters continued to chant even after nightfall and refused to leave until their demands were met. Around 1 am, the protesters began creating barricades to block officers from leaving the building. Tensions continued to be high until around 4:30 am when police moved in and dispersed the crowd.

On July 25, a group of protesters demanding actions against the death of Elijah McClain blocked I-225. An individual drove by the crowd in a Jeep. A protester fired a gun at the Jeep in response and accidentally struck another protester and grazed another. The suspect was later arrested by police. During a preliminary interview with police the driver stated he sped through the crowd because he was surrounded by protesters who were yelling and banging on his car. The driver also claimed a white pickup truck struck his vehicle.

=== Boulder ===
About 50 people organized a modified sit-in style protest where demonstrators peacefully took a knee for one hour on May 29. Hundreds walked three miles through a "Boulder in Solidarity" march on May 30.

=== Colorado Springs ===
About 300 protesters demonstrated by lying on their stomachs in front of City Hall on May 30. Dozens were arrested on May 30. More protests took place on May 31.

The police cited four people for blocking I-25 during rush hour traffic in relation to the protests.

=== Denver ===
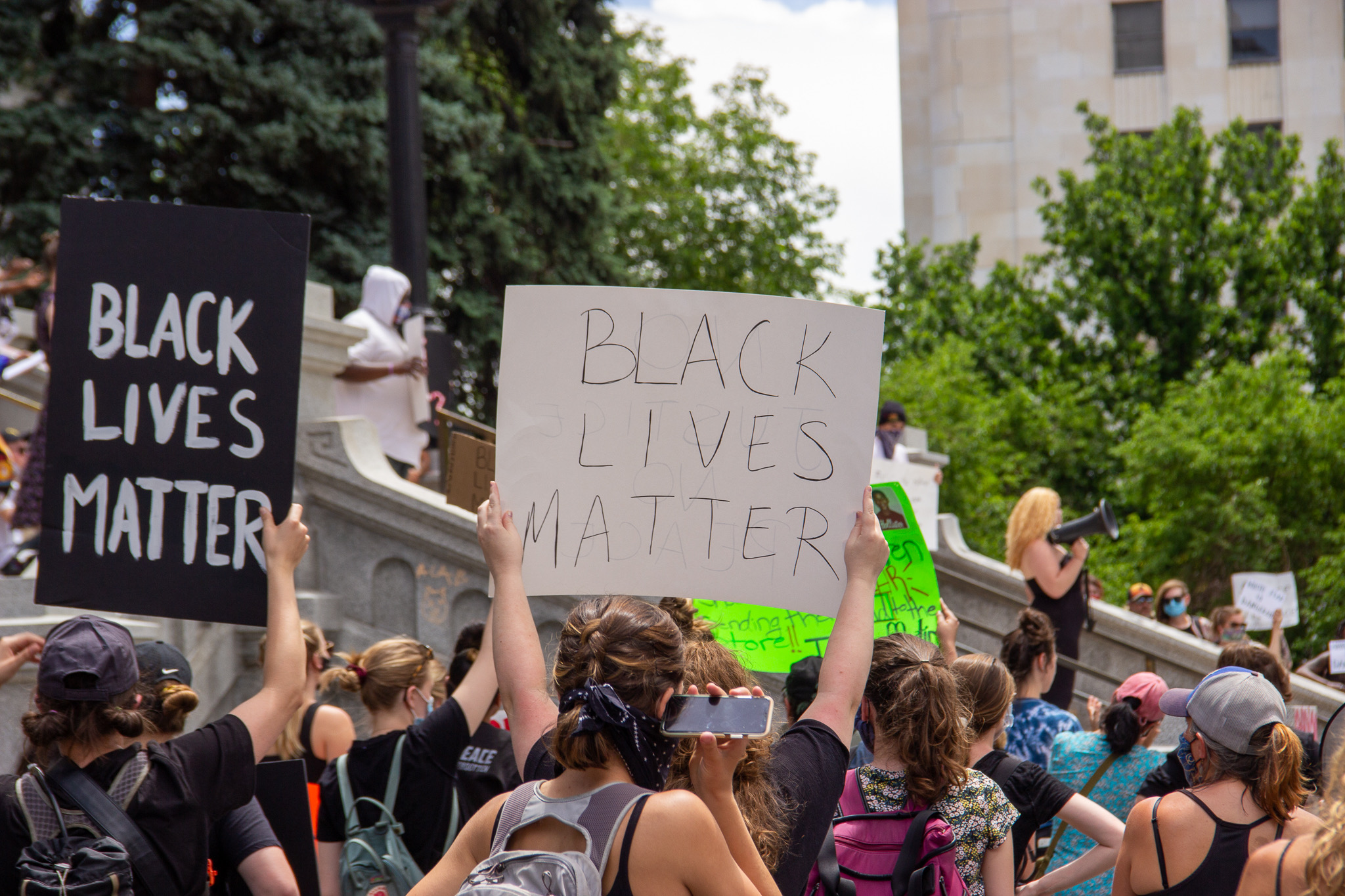
Protest in Denver on May 31.

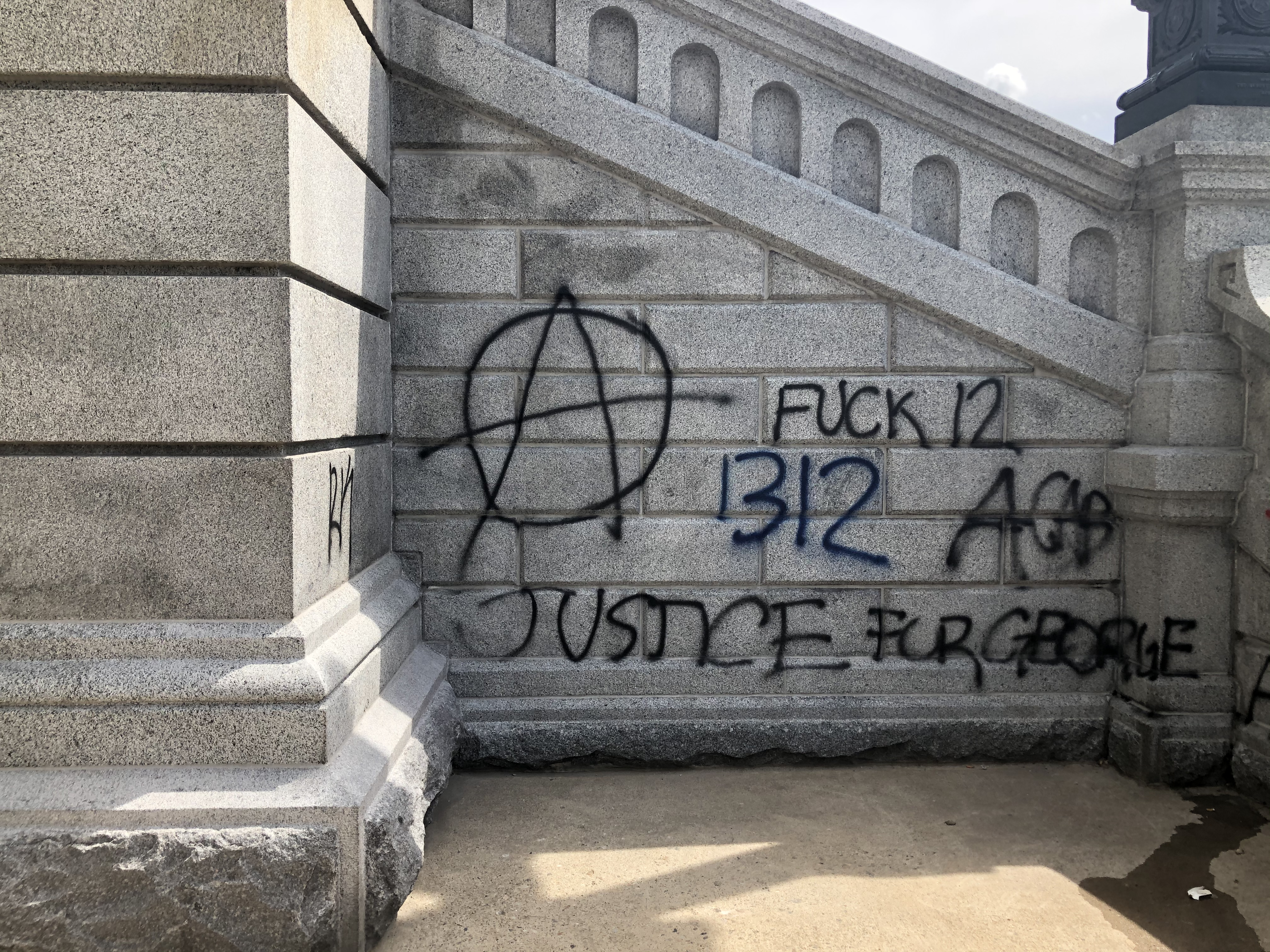
Aftermath of protests in Denver on May 30. Graffiti shows the anarchist circle-A and the ACAB acronym.

On May 28, protesters marched for four hours, blocking traffic on Interstate 25 and demonstrating at the Colorado State Capitol. Multiple gunshots were fired there, and police also fired rubber bullets and shot gas canisters at the crowd. Several properties were damaged. Some protesters also crowded onto 16th Street Mall and toward Interstate 25 via 20th Street and blocked traffic. One video appears to show a vehicle intentionally hitting a protester who had gotten onto the hood of the car. It is not clear what occurred before this—according to the woman who filmed the incident, the man jumped on top of the vehicle before she began filming. Three police officers were injured in clashes with protesters, one of whom had to go to a hospital.

Protests continued throughout the city over the next three days, with protests generally being peaceful during the day followed by more violent clashes between protesters and police later in the evenings. On May 30, Mayor Michael Hancock implemented a citywide curfew from 8:00 p.m. to 5:00 a.m. By the evening of May 31, the Denver Police Department had arrested over 120 people during the protests over the past four days.

On June 2, the Denver Police Department announced the arrest of a man suspected to be the perpetrator behind the vehicular attack of three police which left one officer with a fractured leg and the other two with a "substantial risk of protracted loss or impairment of the function of any part or organ of the body." A fifth night of protests in Denver remained more peaceful on Monday night, June 1, after the previous four nights had seen riotous behavior among smaller elements of the much larger protest gathering. A federal judge stopped Denver police from using teargas on peaceful protesters.

After the fifth day of protests, with some riot-like behavior as well, the City of Denver police oversight group had received over 150 complaints alleging problems with police behavior in the protests.

On July 19, Pro Police Rally Colorado held their annual event at the Denver Civic Center. The Denver chapter of the Party for Socialism and Liberation organized a counter protest in the same location and at the same time. The counter protesters greatly outnumbered the pro-police group and moved into their space, disrupting them with drums and shouted obscenities. Amid the chaos, the Denver Police Department deployed pepper balls and pepper spray.

On October 10, right-wing activist John "Tig" Tiegen organized a gathering at the Denver Civic Center calling it a "Patriot Muster." The Denver Communists, Colorado Socialist Revolution, Anon Resistance Movement, H.O.E.S (Help on Every Street), Front Range Mutual Aid Network, and other groups, scheduled a "BLM-Antifa Soup Drive" at the same time and location as the rally organized by Tiegen. A spokesperson from the Denver Communists confirmed this was a purposeful counter-protest, saying "we are committed to counter-mobilizing against the far right anytime they crawl out of their holes...They should never be allowed to assemble without being vocally opposed." Following the conclusion of the dueling protests, Lee Keltner attempted to attack a news crew member from 9News Denver (the local NBC affiliate) and was subsequently shot and killed by Matthew Dolloff who was working as a private body guard for the news crew.

Keltner—who held white supremacist beliefs, was a member of the white racist prison/motorcycle gang the Sons of Silence (SOS)—was at the Patriot Muster with a group displaying SOS patches as well as tattoos indicating membership in violent antigovernmental militias. Dolloff was a private body guard who was providing protection for 9News Denver. It was common for all local news crews throughout the entirety of the George Floyd Protests to hire private body guards. Video and a series of still photography of the incident show that immediately prior to the shooting, Keltner and several right-wing protesters he was traveling with were involved in an argument with an unarmed Black male counter-protester from the BLM-Antifa Soup Drive. In this incident, Keltner was threatening and shouting racial slurs while pointing an aerosol can of bear-mace, held in his right hand, at the counter-protester in a threatening and aggressive manner. One other right-wing protester aggressively deployed a retractable baton-type weapon. Keltner was also armed with a pistol in a shoulder holster that was poorly concealed and visible under his vest. Additionally, Keltner was adorning a series of large rings on his fingers, a commonly known replacement for brass knuckles in areas like Colorado where actual brass knuckles are illegal. When Keltner saw a member of the 9News crew filming the aggressive and potentially violent interaction, he assaulted the crew member by pushing him and stating that this was no place for cameras. Dolloff, acting as the body guard for the news crew, blocked Keltner from approaching and further menacing the crew member. Keltner then struck Dolloff in the face with his left hand and followed up by spraying Dolloff with the bear-mace he held in his right hand. This led to Dolloff using his concealed weapon to fire one lethal shot while Keltner was still spraying bear-mace into Dolloff's face. Although Dolloff was arrested at the scene and charged with second degree murder, charges were eventually dropped as Keltner's actions were shown to be aggressive enough to justify Dolloff's actions as self-defense.

==== FBI Infiltration ====
In 2023, journalist Trevor Aaronson discovered documents proving that the FBI had hired Michael Adam "Mickey" Windecker II, a violent convicted felon with several protection orders filed against him, to infiltrate and disrupt the Denver BLM movement and to incite participants to commit crimes.

Windecker convinced Zebbodios “Zebb” Hall, a Denver-based black activist, to purchase a gun on Windecker's behalf, a felony offense which would later be used to convict Hall.

Windecker targeted another black activist, Bryce Shelby, who he tried to convince to assassinate Colorado Attorney General Phil Weiser. Despite Shelby's refusal to act on this plan, his guns were seized under Colorado's red flag laws.

=== Fort Collins ===
About 100 protesters chanted "No Justice, No Peace!" the Fort Collins Police Services headquarters on May 28. On June 1, about 150 protesters gathered at the same place while about 10 people attended a vigil at Civic Center Park.

=== Glenwood Springs ===
On June 1, dozens protested in front of Glenwood Springs City Hall at a rally organized by "Western Slope Anti-Racist Action."

=== Grand Junction ===
On May 30, hundreds attended a vigil organized by Grand Junction Mutual Aid, Grand Junction Black Lives Matter and West Slope Anti-Racist Action. Every day for at least a week, more protests and marches took place around the city and at Colorado Mesa University.

On June 17, a large city council meeting became heated after a councilman made public comments about needing to get his gun because of the protests.

=== Greeley ===
On June 13, a group of nearly 1,000 protesters marched down 11th Avenue to Lincoln Park to protest police brutality. Protesters gathered at Lincoln Park again on June 19.

=== Littleton ===
On June 19, which is also Juneteenth, around 50 people gathered at the intersection of South Broadway and Arapahoe Road in Littleton to support Black Lives Matter. The protest was organized by Littleton resident Lynne Popkowski and most protesters were social distancing due to COVID-19.

=== Pueblo ===
On June 1, around 400 people marched through the Riverwalk and Union Avenue district to voice support for George Floyd despite rainfall. The chief of the Pueblo Police Department spoke in support of the protest.

== Gallery ==
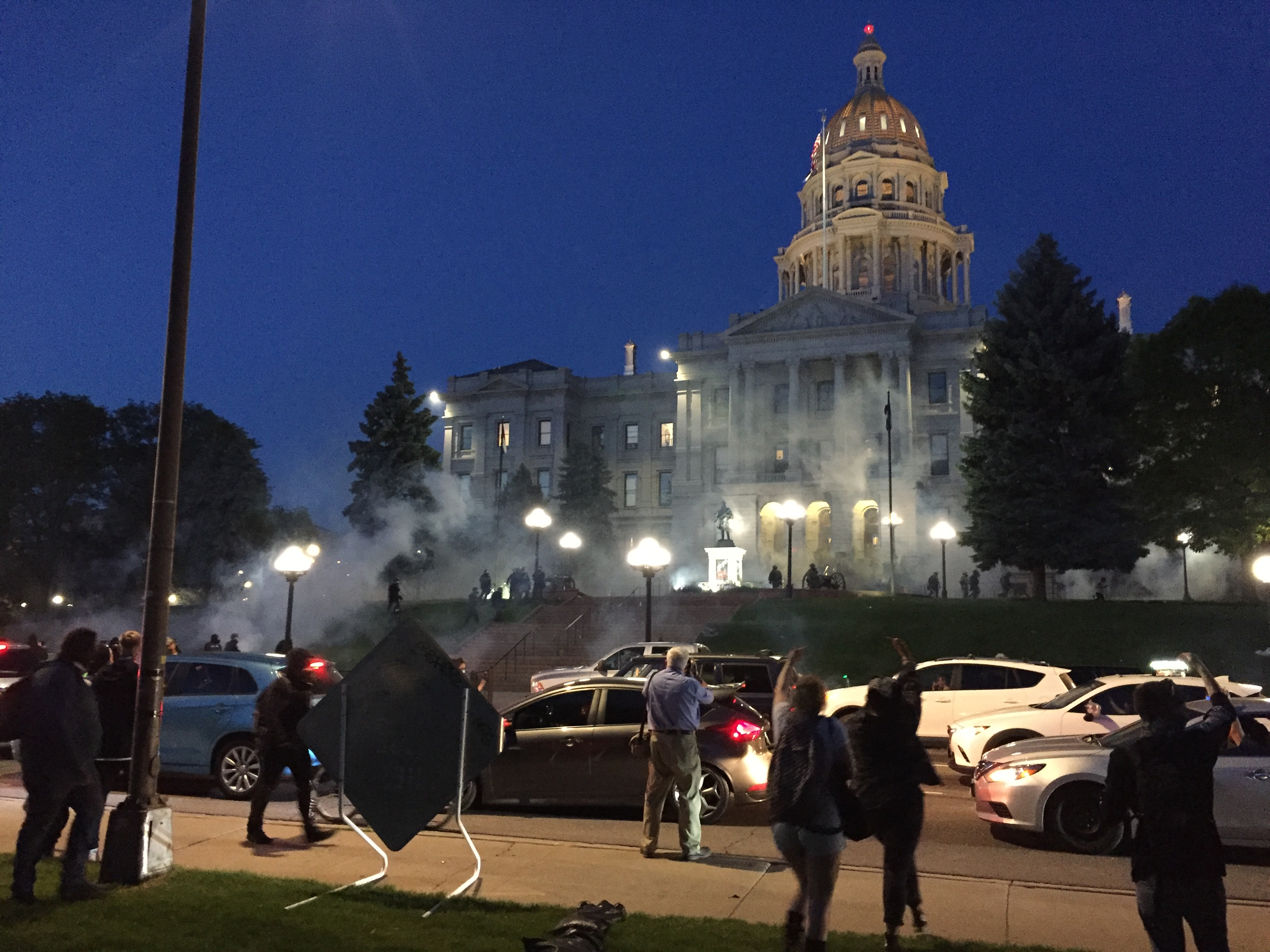
Colorado Capitol in a haze of tear gas

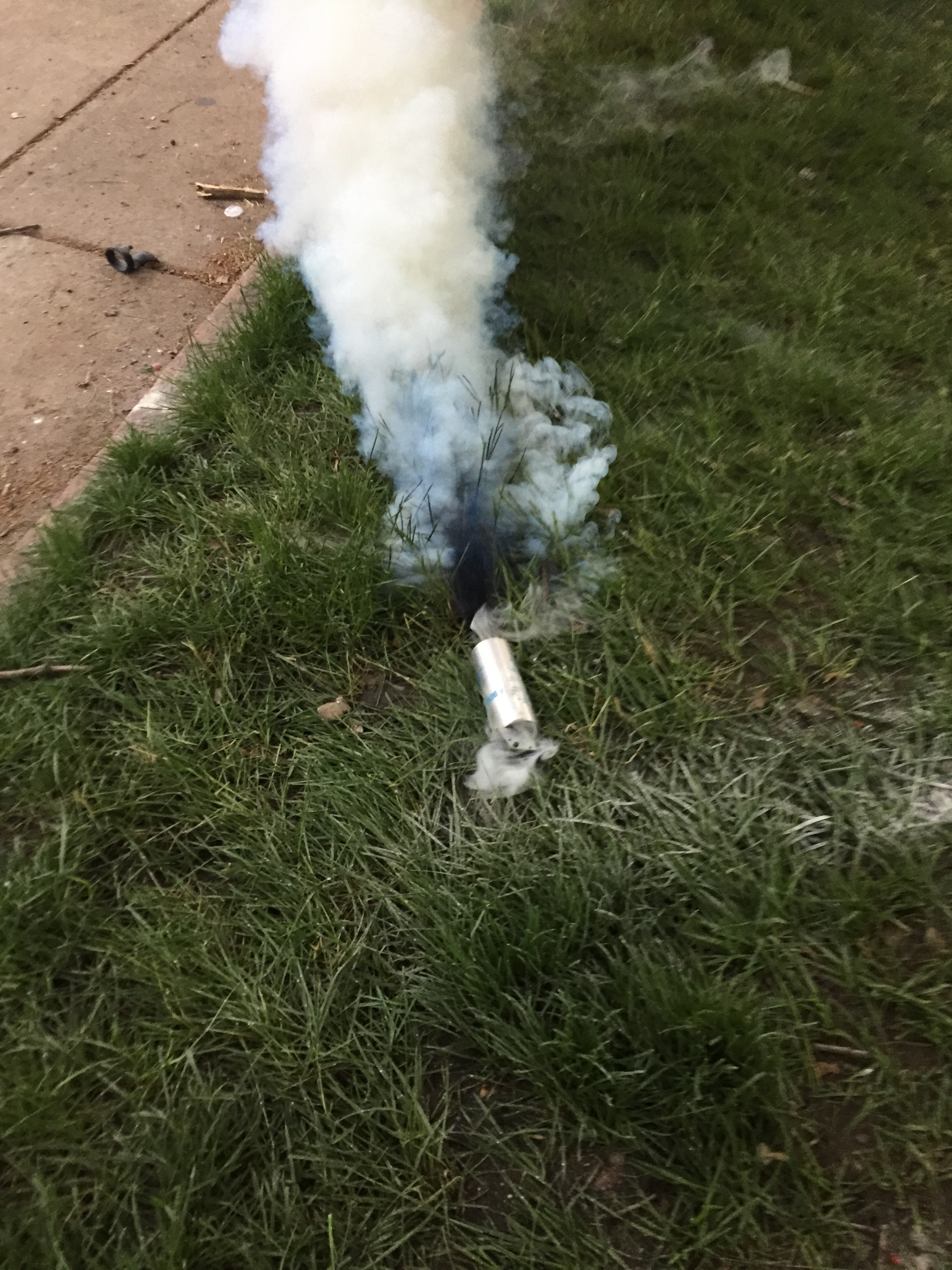
Gas canister fired into group of protesters by Denver Police

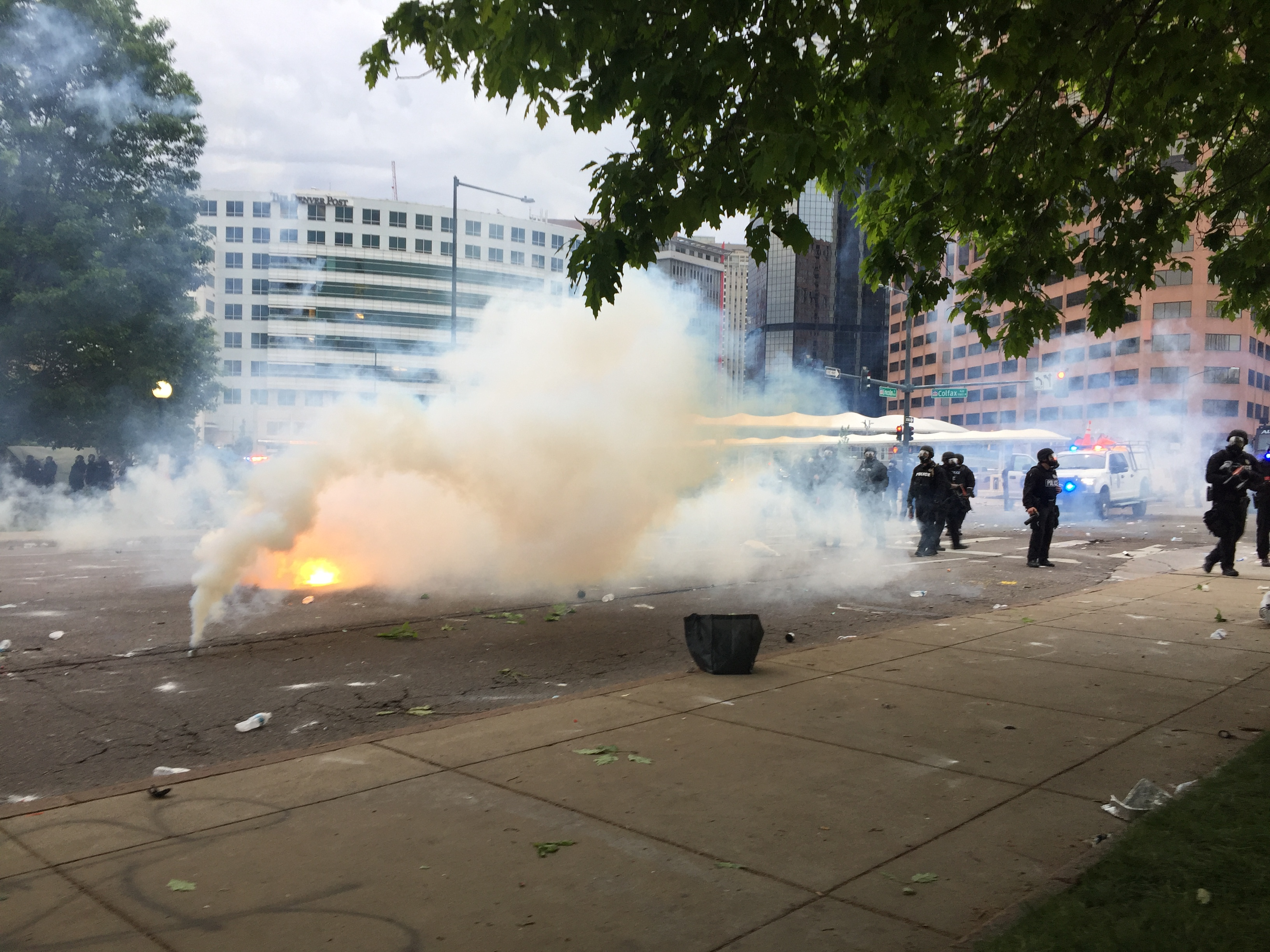
Flashbang exploding in a cloud of tear gas fired by Denver Police

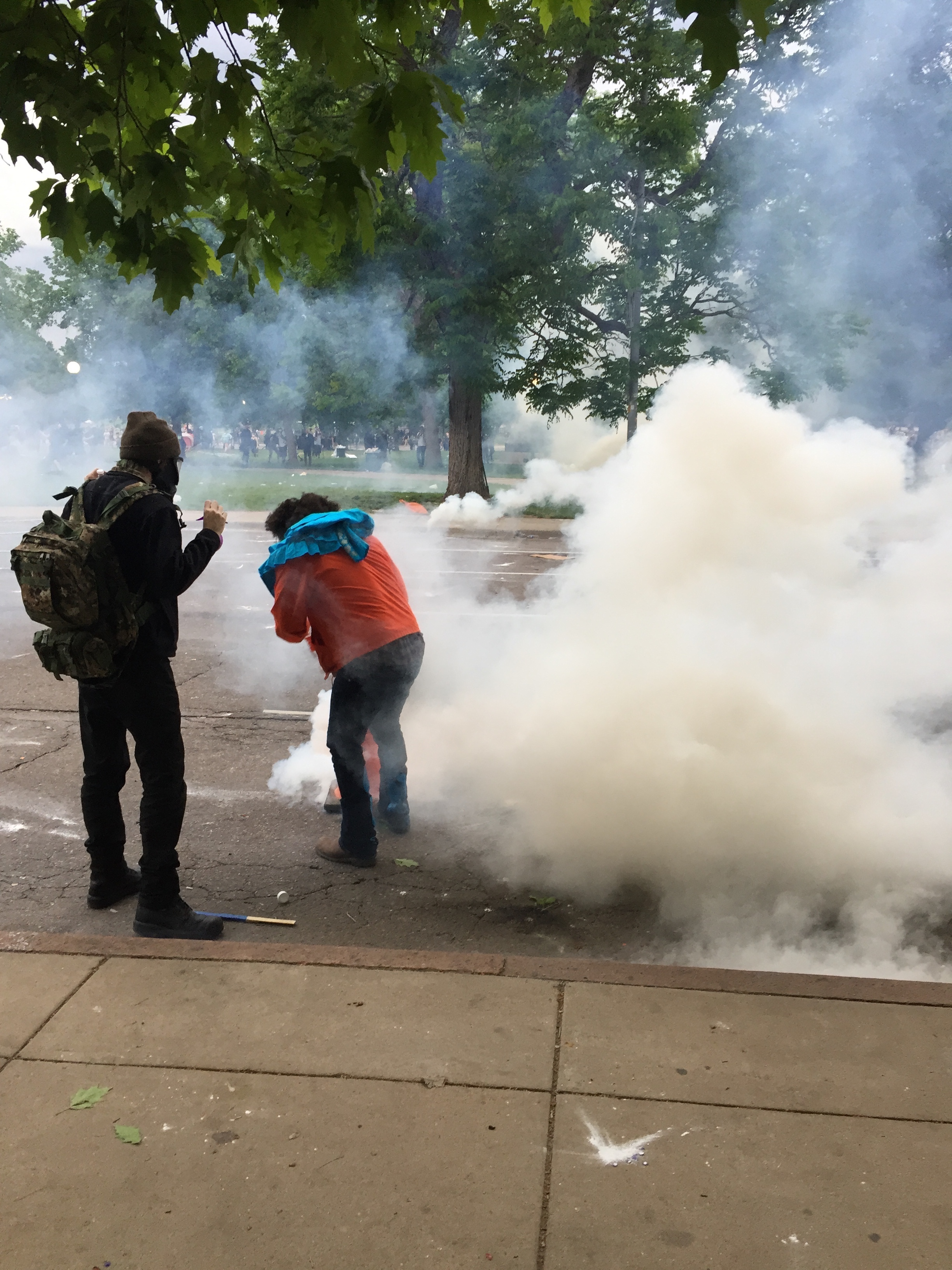
Protesters attempting to move gas canisters away from crowds on May 30 in Denver.

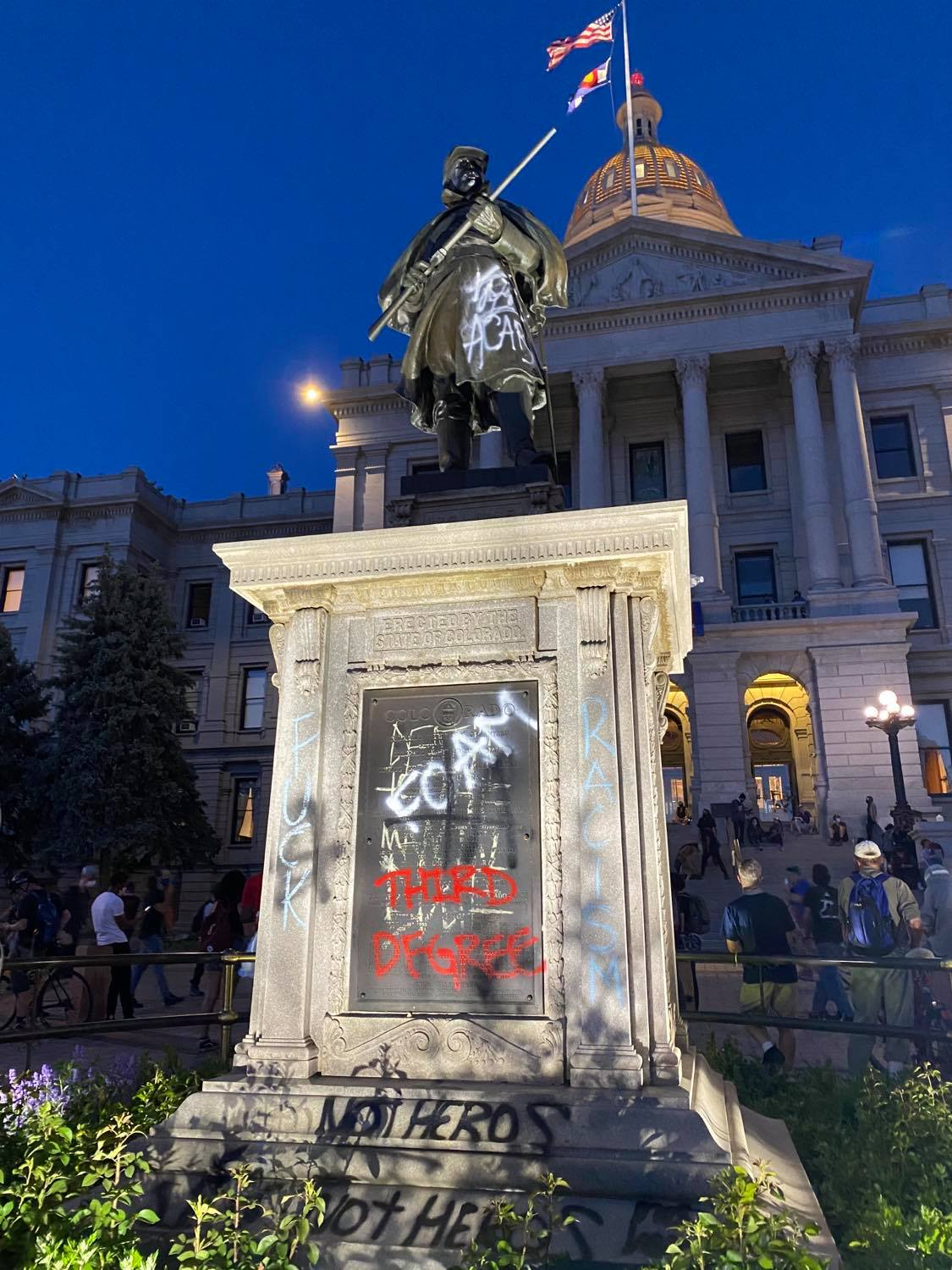
Graffiti spray painted on the Denver Civil War Monument.

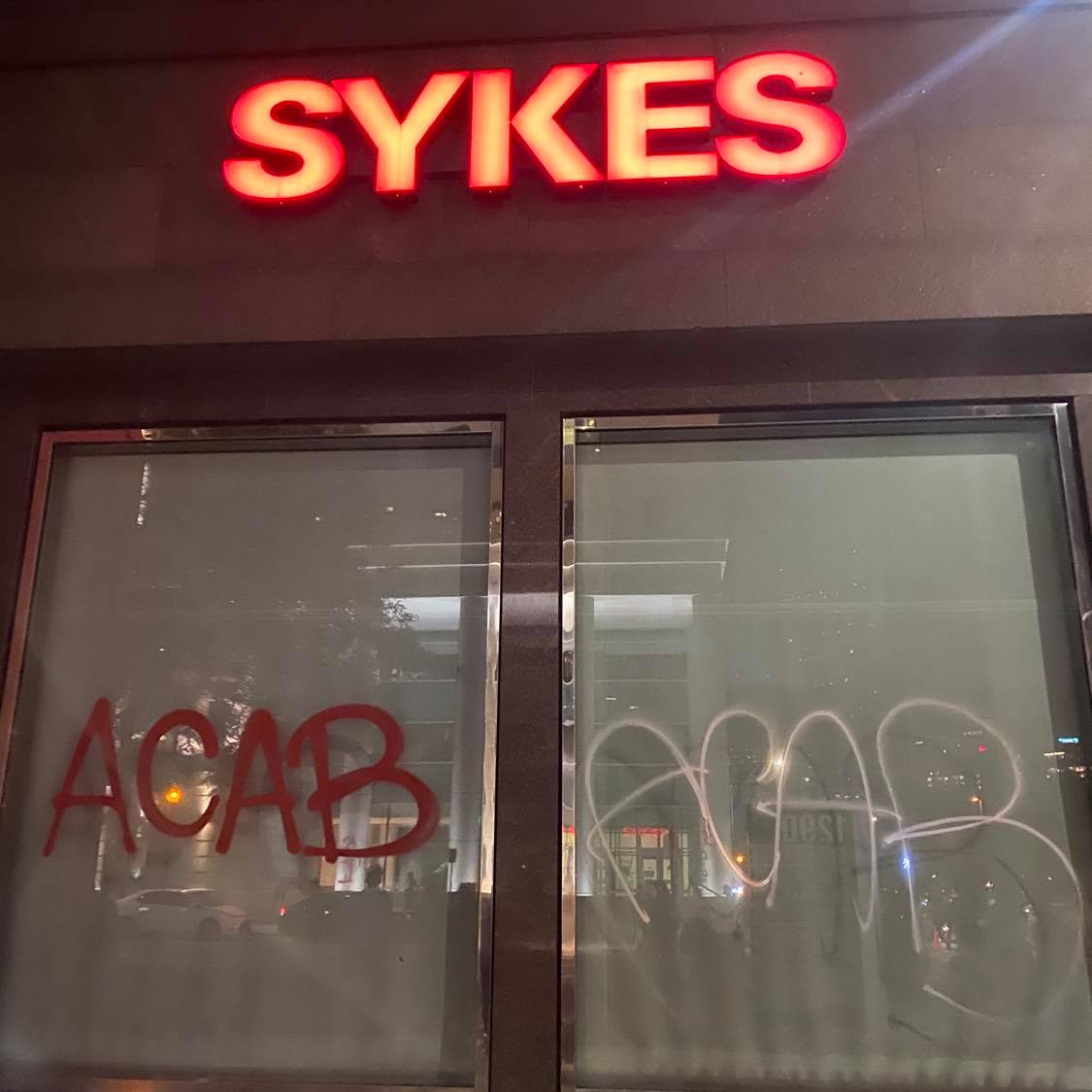
Denver Sykes building spray painted during George Floyd protests.
