= Weld County Veterans Memorial =

War memorial

Coordinates: 40°24′55″N 104°44′10″W

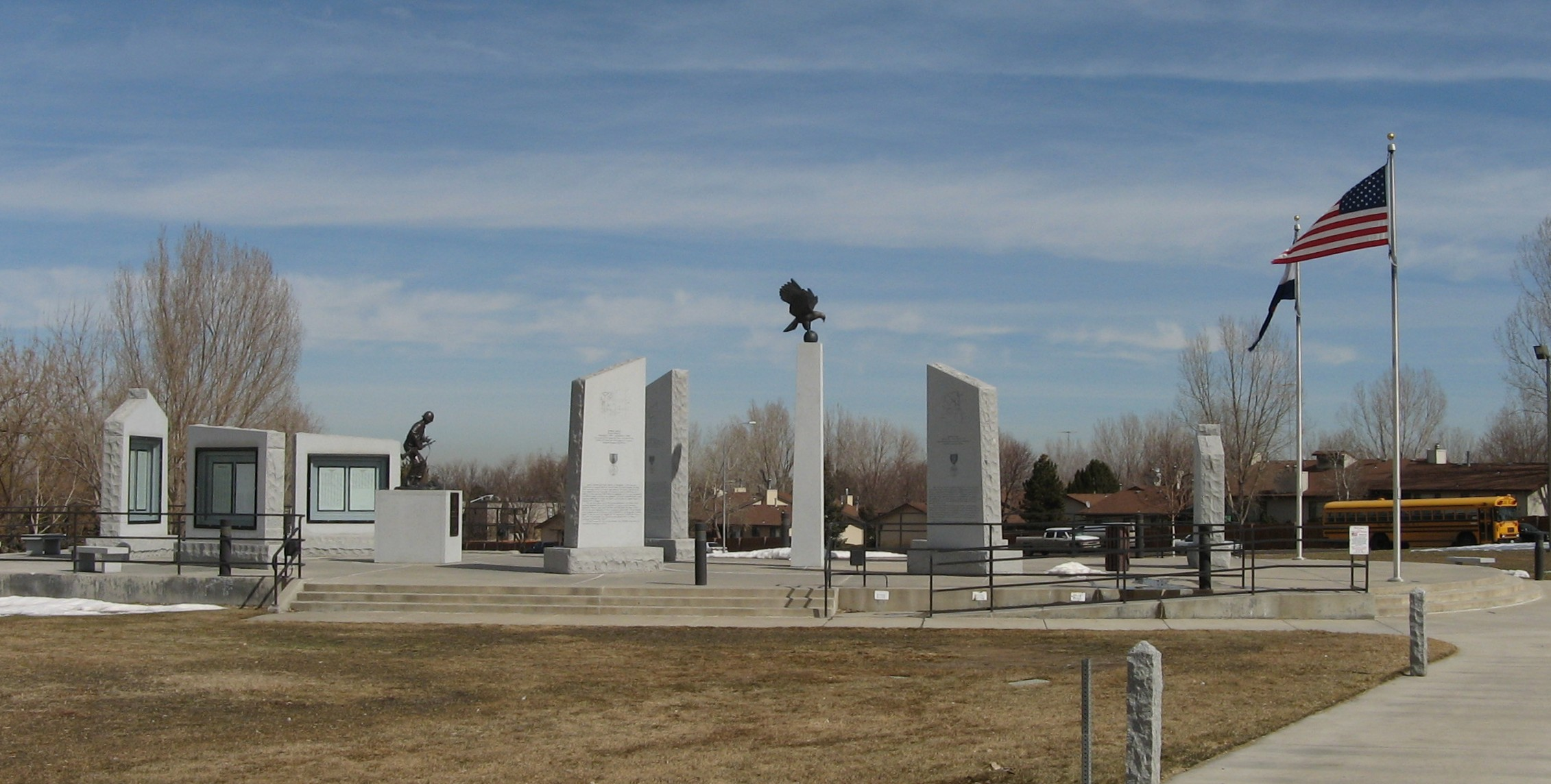
The Weld County Veterans Memorial.

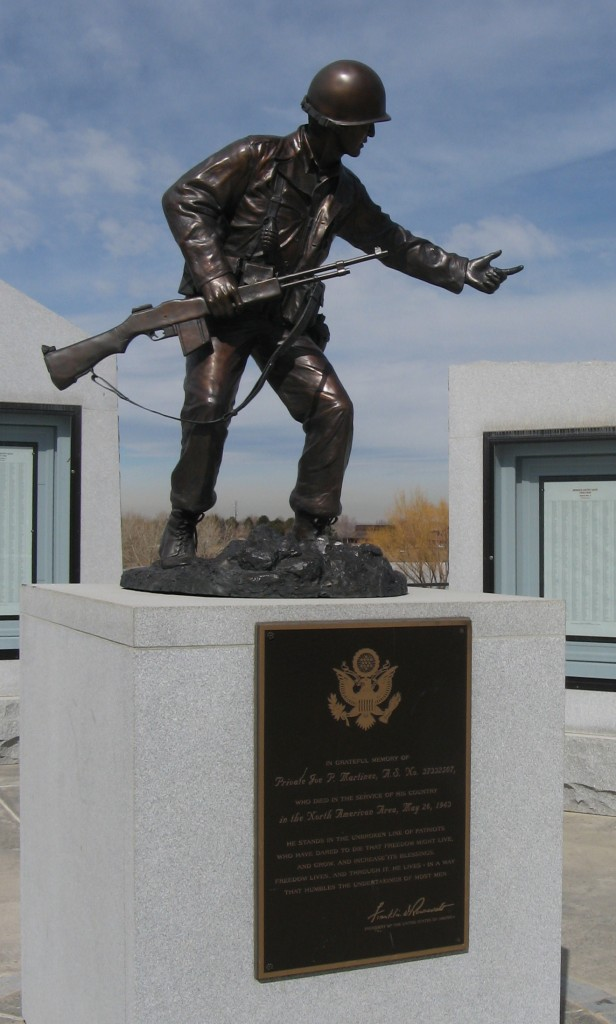
Bronze sculpture by Maxine of Greeley, Colorado of Medal of Honor recipient Joe P. Martinez.

The Weld County Veterans Memorial is located in Greeley, Colorado near Bittersweet Park at the corner of 16th St. and 35th Ave. It is "dedicated to the men and women of Weld County who have served our country in times of peace and war, and especially to those who gave their lives".

Dedicated on Veterans Day in 1997, the memorial's 10th anniversary was celebrated on Veterans Day, 2007. Annual Veterans Day, and Armed Forces Day ceremonies are held at the memorial.

The centerpiece of the memorial is a statue of Pvt. Joe P. Martinez of Ault, Colorado, the first Weld County resident to be awarded the Medal of Honor. The bronze plaque below the statue reads:

IN GRATEFUL MEMORY OF
Private Joe P. Martinez, A.S. No. 37332507,
WHO DIED IN THE SERVICE OF HIS COUNTRY
in the North American Area, May 26, 1943

HE STANDS IN THE UNBROKEN LINE OF PATRIOTS
WHO HAVE DARED TO DIE THAT FREEDOM MIGHT LIVE,
AND GROW, AND INCREASE ITS BLESSINGS.
FREEDOM LIVES, AND THROUGH IT HE LIVES - IN A WAY
THAT HUMBLES THE UNDERSTANDINGS OF MOST MEN

Franklin D. Roosevelt
PRESIDENT OF THE UNITED STATES OF AMERICA

The memorial includes granite slabs commemorating many of the theaters of war in US military history, along with brief narratives. Also displayed are the names of the men and women from Weld County who served in each of these conflicts.
