= Joe P. Martínez =

U.S. Army soldier (1920–1943)

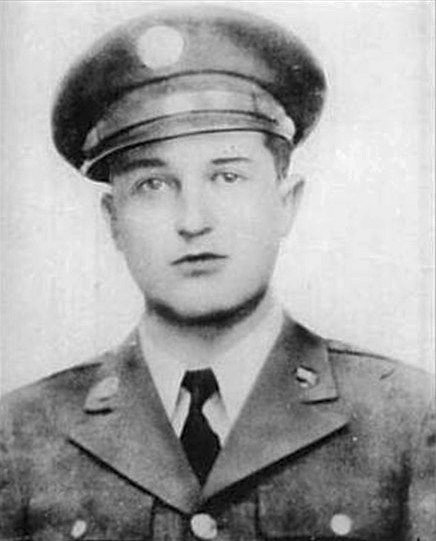
- Private Joe P. Martínez, Medal of Honor recipient
- Born: July 27, 1920; Taos, New Mexico
- Died: May 26, 1943 (aged 22); Attu, Aleutian Islands, Alaska
- Burial place: Ault Cemetery, Ault, Colorado
- Military career
- Allegiance: United States of America
- Branch: United States Army
- Service years: 1942–1943
- Rank: Private
- Units: Company K, 32d Infantry, 7th Infantry Division
- Conflicts: World War II: Battle of the Aleutian Islands
- Awards: Medal of Honor; Purple Heart

Private Joseph Pp. Martínez (July 27, 1920 – May 26, 1943) born in Taos, New Mexico, was a United States Army soldier who posthumously received the Medal of Honor — the United States' highest military decoration — for his actions on the Aleutian Islands during World War II. Private Joseph P. Martínez was the first Hispanic-American and first Coloradan to receive the Medal of Honor during World War II. His posthumous award was the first act for combat heroism on American soil (other than the 15 at Pearl Harbor) since the Indian Wars.

== Early years ==
Joe Martínez, a Mexican-American, was one of seven children born to José Manuel Martínez and María Eduvigen Romo, both who were natives of New Mexico. In 1927, his father, who was an agricultural laborer, decided to move from Taos, New Mexico to Ault, Colorado. There, Martínez received his primary and secondary education. In August 1942, he was drafted into the United States Army and sent to Camp Roberts, California where he received his basic training.

== World War II ==
On June 6, 1942, Japanese forces invaded the island of Kiska and on June 7, the island of Attu. These islands are among the westernmost islands on the Aleutian chain and are part of Alaska. The U.S. feared that the islands would be used as bases from which to launch a full-scale aerial assault against the cities in the United States West Coast, and it became a matter of national pride to expel the first invaders to occupy American soil since the War of 1812.

After Martínez completed his basic training, he was assigned to Company K, 32d Infantry, 7th Infantry Division. On May 11, 1943, the 7th Infantry Division landed at Holtz Bay, Attu, officially starting the Battle of Attu. On May 25, 32nd Infantry Regiment was engaged in combat in the vicinity of Fish Hook Ridge against enemy troops. The regiment was pinned down by enemy machine gun fire and Martinez on his own account led two assaults. He fired his Browning Automatic Rifle (BAR) into the Japanese foxholes, killing five machine gunners, and the men of his unit followed. Martínez was shot in the head as he approached one final foxhole after the second assault, dying of the wound the following day. Martínez was posthumously awarded the Medal of Honor.

Private Martínez was the first Hispanic-American recipient who was posthumously awarded the Medal of Honor for combat heroism on American soil during World War II.

== Medal of Honor citation ==
Pvt. JOE P. MARTINEZ
Rank and organization: Private, U.S. Army, Company K, 32d Infantry, 7th Infantry Division.
Place and date: On Attu, Aleutians, May 26, 1943.
Entered service at: Ault, Colorado
Birth: Taos, New Mexico
G.O. No.: 71, October 27, 1943.
Citation:

For conspicuous gallantry and intrepidity above and beyond the call of duty in action with the enemy. Over a period of several days, repeated efforts to drive the enemy from a key defensive position high in the snow-covered precipitous mountains between East Arm Holtz Bay and Chichagof Harbor had failed. On 26 May 1943, troop dispositions were readjusted and a trial coordinated attack on this position by a reinforced battalion was launched. Initially successful, the attack hesitated. In the face of severe hostile machine gun, rifle, and mortar fire, Pvt. Martinez, an automatic rifleman, rose to his feet and resumed his advance. Occasionally he stopped to urge his comrades on. His example inspired others to follow. After a most difficult climb, Pvt. Martinez eliminated resistance from part of the enemy position by BAR fire and hand grenades, thus assisting the advance of other attacking elements. This success only partially completed the action. The main Holtz-Chichagof Pass rose about 150 feet higher, flanked by steep rocky ridges and reached by a snow-filled defile. Passage was barred by enemy fire from either flank and from tiers of snow trenches in front. Despite these obstacles, and knowing of their existence, Pvt. Martinez again led the troops on and up, personally silencing several trenches with BAR fire and ultimately reaching the pass itself. Here, just below the knifelike rim of the pass, Pvt. Martinez encountered a final enemy-occupied trench and as he was engaged in firing into it he was mortally wounded. The pass, however, was taken, and its capture was an important preliminary to the end of organized hostile resistance

== Honors ==
Martínez was buried with full military honors at Ault Cemetery, Ault, Weld County in Colorado. On April 13, 1945, the United States Navy named one of its ships, which served as a troop transport during the Korean War, the USNS Private Joe P. Martinez. The state of Colorado has honored his memory by naming a street and renaming a former base reception center and early officer's club which currently serves as the service center after him. The government named a Disabled American Veterans chapter in Colorado and an American Legion post in California in his honor. Three statues were erected with his likeness and are located in the Colorado cities of Ault, Greeley at the Weld County Veterans Memorial Park, and Denver. The U.S. Army also named an Army Reserve military installation in Denver, Colorado after Martinez. The 7th Infantry Division honored him by naming the Fort Ord Welcome Center (originally the Post Headquarters built in 1941)Martinez Hall in 1977. Although Fort Ord closed in 1993, Martinez Hall still serves as a Veterans Transition Service Center. The City of Denver has also named a park after Private Martinez, "Joseph P Martinez Park", which is at 900 N Raleigh St, Denver, CO.

Gallery of images related to Joe P. Martínez
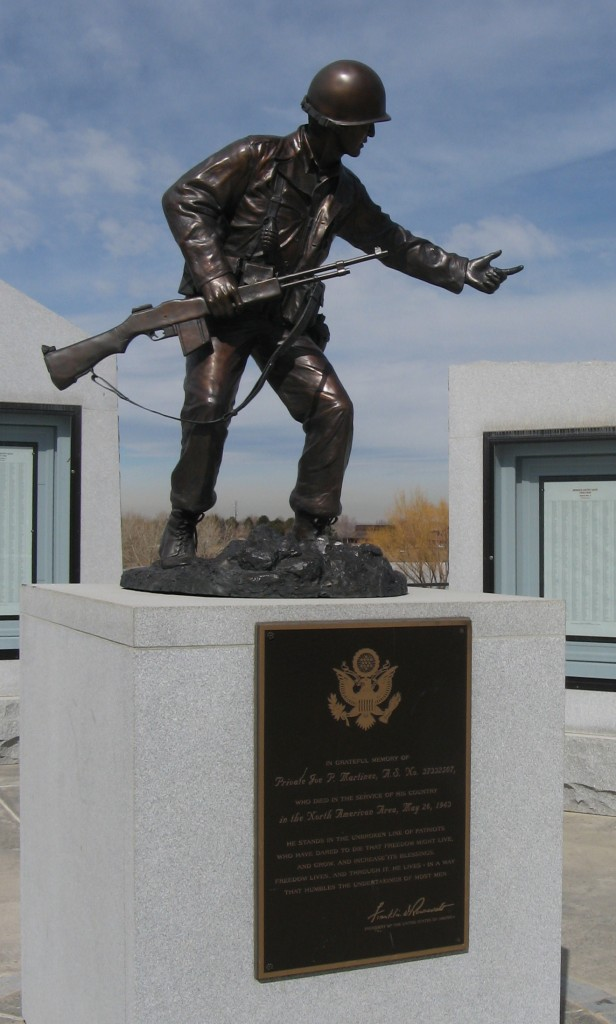
Bronze Statue of Pvt. Joe P. Martinez by Maxine at the Weld County Veterans Memorial

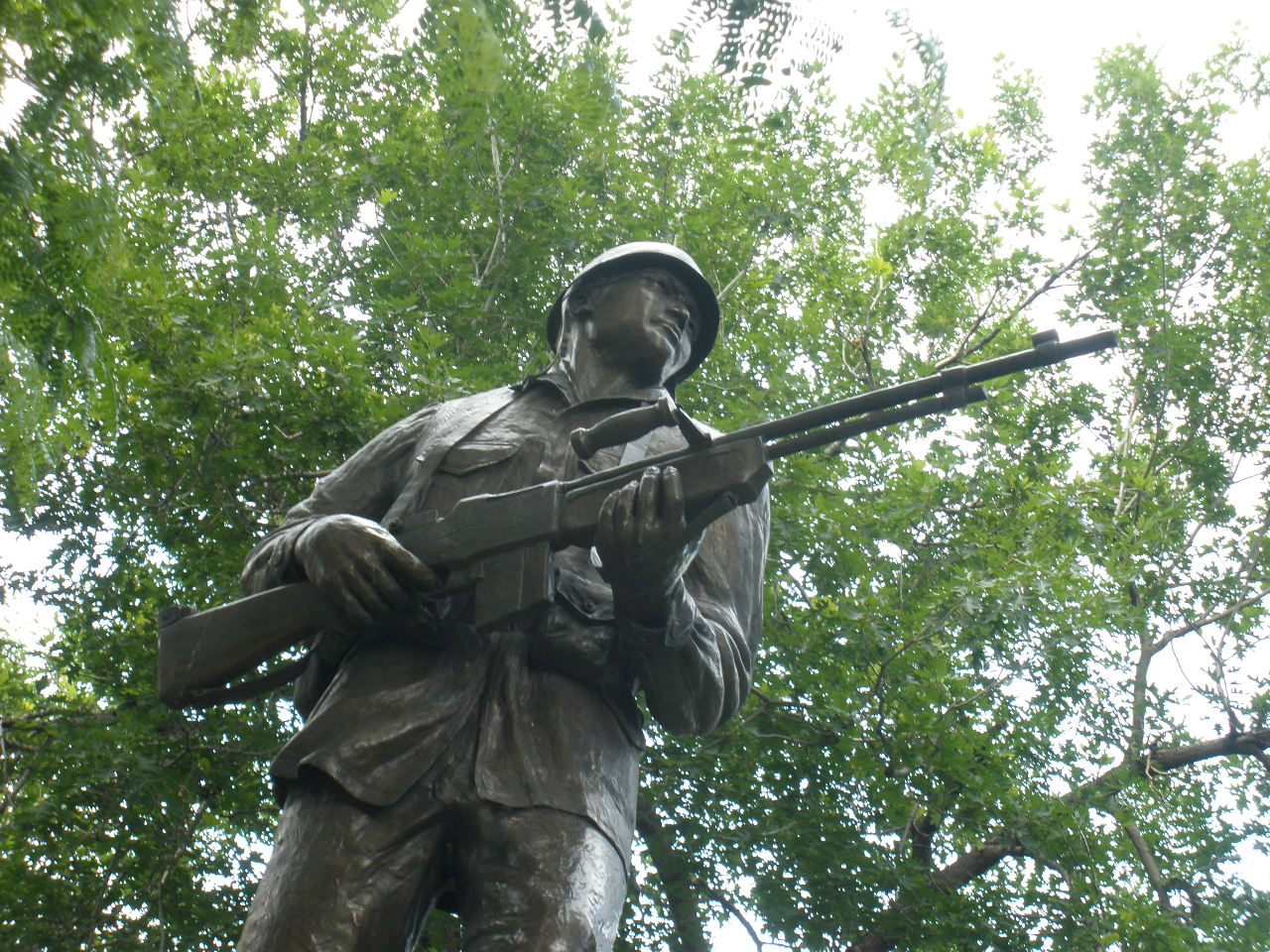
Statue of Martínez in Denver

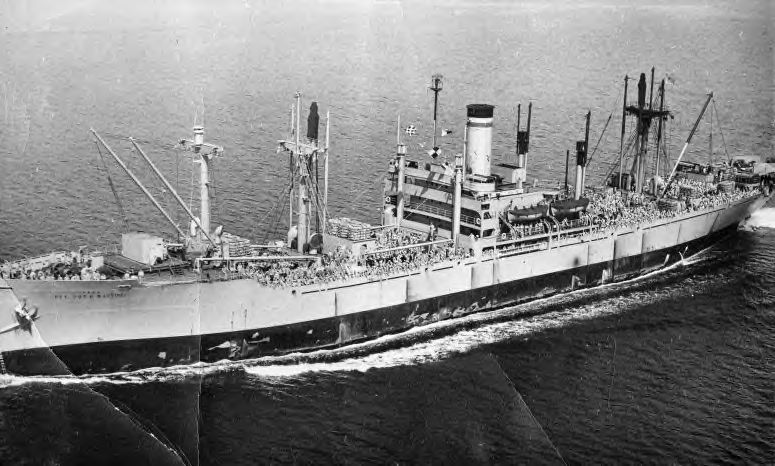
USS Pvt. Joe P. Martínez

== Awards and decorations ==
Among Private Joe P. Martínez' decorations and medals were the following:

Badge	Combat Infantryman Badge		
1st row	Medal of Honor		
2nd row	Bronze Star Medal	Purple Heart	Good Conduct Medal
3rd row	American Campaign Medal	Asiatic-Pacific Campaign Medal with 1 Campaign star	World War II Victory Medal

== See also ==
- List of Medal of Honor recipients for World War II
- Hispanic Medal of Honor recipients
- Weld County Veterans Memorial
- Hispanic Americans in World War II
