= Scottish Angus Cow and Calf =

2001 bronze sculpture by Dan Ostermiller

- Artist: Dan Ostermiller
- Medium: Bronze sculpture
- Location: Denver Art Museum, Denver, Colorado, United States; 39°44′7.5″N 104°59′20.8″W

Scottish Angus Cow and Calf is a 2001 bronze sculpture by American artist Dan Ostermiller, installed in Denver, Colorado, United States. It depicts a cow and a calf. According to Westword, "The work captures the body language of the cows that Ostermiller observed to create the piece, mimicking how they behaved in his presence while in their natural habitat."

The work was commissioned by American businessman Leo Hindery and weighs approximately five tons. Leigh Chavez Bush of Westword has described the larger-than-life sculpture as "enormous". Hindery gifted the artwork to the Denver Art Museum in 2006. In 2010, the Ladies Fancywork Society placed scarves on the sculpture.

The work has been described as "one of the best-known public art installations in Colorado". Julianna O'Clair included the sculpture in Westword's 2023 list of Denver's ten "most famous" public artworks.

The Denver Art Museum also has a 2000 maquette of Scottish Angus Cow and Calf.
