= I Know You Know That I Know =

Mural in Denver, Colorado, U.S.

- Artist: Sandra Fettingis
- Medium: Acrylic panels, paint
- Location: Denver, Colorado

I Know You Know That I Know is a mural by Sandra Fettingis, installed at the Colorado Convention Center, in Denver, Colorado, U.S.
