= Shadow Array =

Sculpture in Denver, Colorado, U.S.

- Artist: Patrick Marold
- Location: Denver International Airport, Denver, Colorado, U.S.; 39.8468°N 104.6743°W

Shadow Array is a sculpture by Patrick Marold, installed at the Denver International Airport in Denver, Colorado, United States.
