= Colorado Tribute to Veterans Monument =

War memorial in Denver, Colorado, U.S.

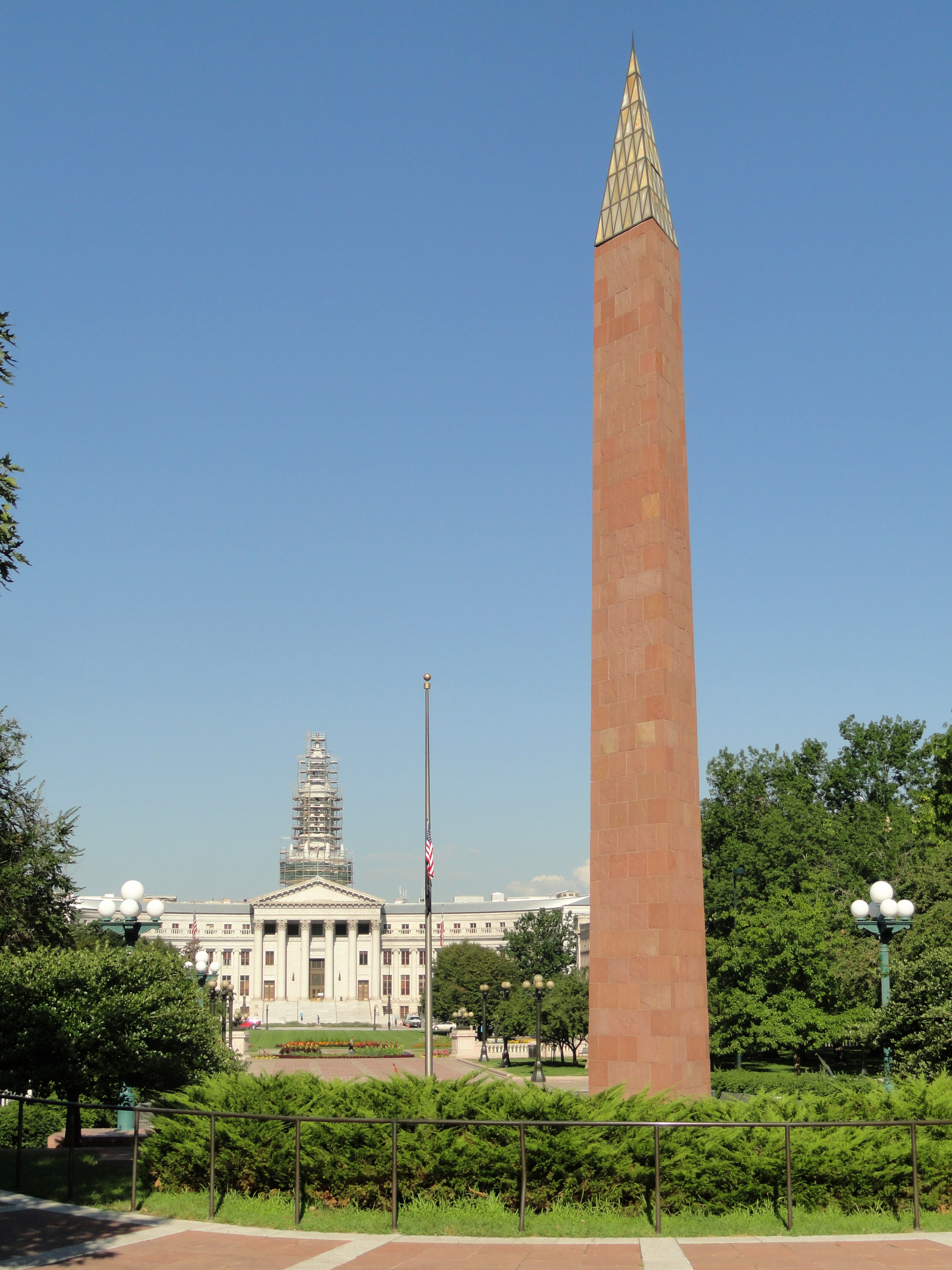
- Colorado Veterans Monument, Civic Center Park, Denver, Colorado
- Interactive map of Colorado Tribute to Veterans Monument
- Location: Colorado State Capitol, Denver, Colorado, U.S.
- Coordinates: 39.7392°N 104.9866°W
- Type: Monument
- Dedicated date: November 10, 1990

The Colorado Tribute to Veterans Monument is a memorial commemorating World War I, World War II, Korea, Vietnam, and Gulf War veterans, installed outside the Colorado State Capitol, in Denver, United States. The monument was dedicated on November 10, 1990.
