= For Jennifer =

Sculpture in Denver, Colorado, U.S.

- Artist: Joel Shapiro
- Dimensions: 9.8 m (32 ft)
- Location: Denver, Colorado, U.S.
- 39.736260°N 104.989860°W

For Jennifer is a 32-foot-tall sculpture by Joel Shapiro, installed in Denver, Colorado, U.S.
