= Iridescent Cloud (sculpture) =

Sculpture in Denver, Colorado, U.S.

- Artist: Laura Haddad; Tom Drugan
- Location: Denver, Colorado, U.S.
- 39.746841°N 104.942467°W

Iridescent Cloud is a sculpture by Laura Haddad and Tom Drugan, installed outside the Denver Museum of Nature & Science, in Denver, Colorado, U.S. The main feature is a sculpture built from hundreds of acrylic prisms woven into a webs of mirror stainless steel rod loosely derived from the molecular structure of hexagonal quartz crystals.
