= Burns Park Sculpture Garden =

Sculpture garden in Denver, Colorado, USA

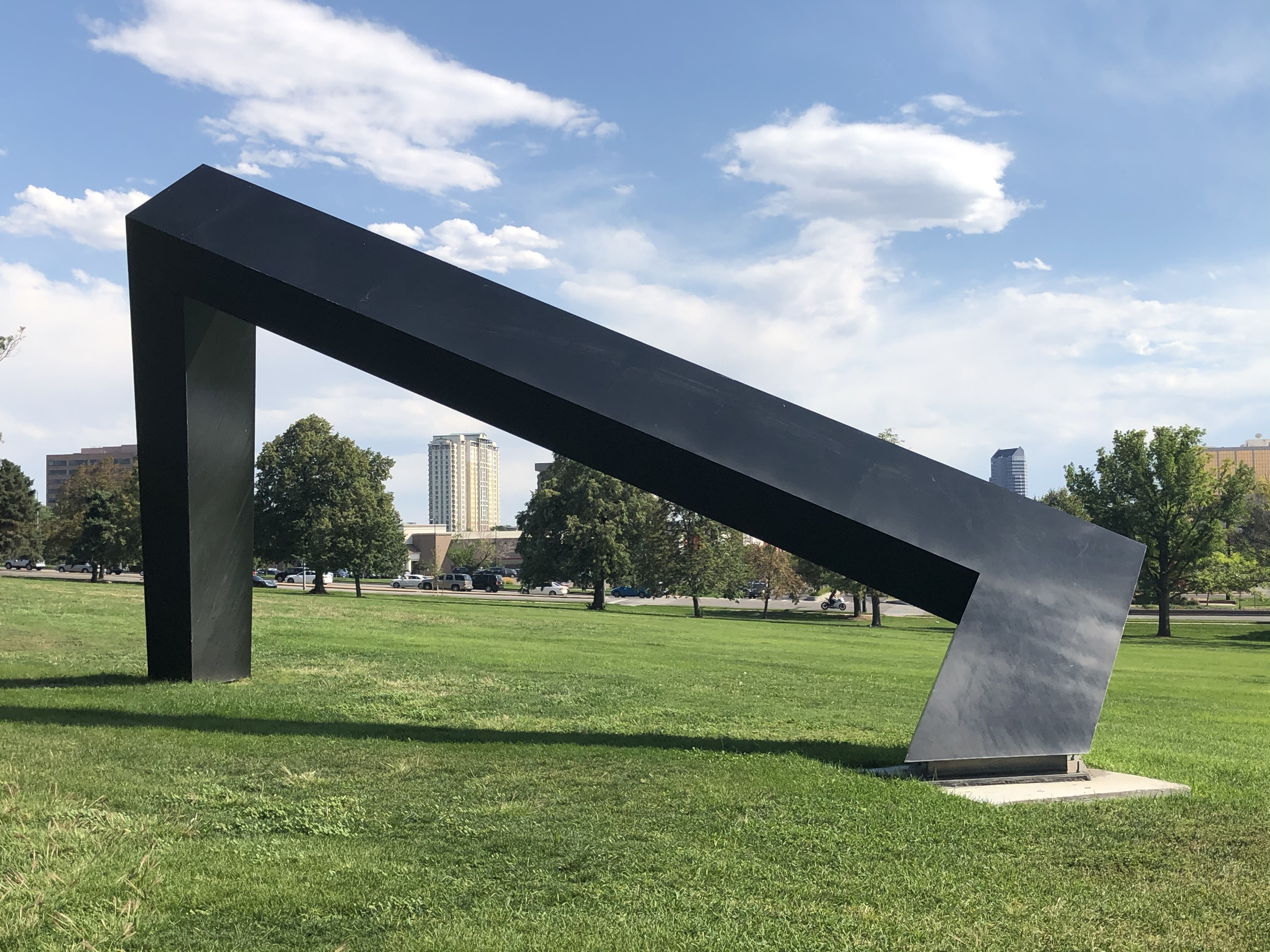

- Location within Colorado
- Interactive map of Burns Park Sculpture Garden
- Type: Sculpture garden
- Nearest city: Denver, Colorado, U.S.
- Coordinates: 39.71264°N 104.93942°W

Burns Park Sculpture Garden, also called DC Burns Park, is in Denver, Colorado, U.S. It is named after Daniel C. Burns, a Denver real estate developer and philanthropist, who donated the park land to the city of Denver in 1939. The park is significant due to its collection of large sculptures, most of them created in the 1960s. The six sculptures currently on display in the park are Untitled (1968) by Wilbert Verhelst, Untitled (1968) by Roger Kotoske, Untitled (1968) by Angelo di Benedetto, Jazz (1999) by Barbara Baer, Untitled (1968) by Anthony Magar, and Untitled (Dedicated to Martin Luther King Jr.) (1968) by Anthony Magar.

== History (1967-present) ==
In 1967, University of Denver professor Beverly Rosen, her husband Bernie, and artists Roger Kotoske and Wilbert Verhelst came up with the idea of creating a sculpture park in Denver, the first of its kind in the area. With the help of Angelo di Benedetto, they put together the Denver Sculpture Symposium held in Burns Park in the summer of 1968. The sculptures were built on-site over several months, so passersby were able to observe and even talk to the artists. Nine sculptures were created, all made from donated plywood. They were intended for people to walk onto and “actively enjoy”, hence the cheap materials. The nine sculptures unveiled on August 31, 1968 were: Untitled by Angelo di Benedetto, a white and yellow pair of arches; Untitled (Magic Cube) by Dean Fleming, a blue and yellow cube illusion; Untitled by Peter Forakis, a red and black bench; Untitled by Roger Kotoske, a trio of red diamonds; Untitled (Dedicated to Martin Luther King Jr.) by Anthony Magar, a black arch; Untitled by Robert Mangold, a blue spire; Untitled by Robert Morris, a brown I-beam shape; Untitled by Richard Van Buren, a brown bench with a footrest; Untitled by Wilbert Verhelst, a black and red block.

It's not clear how long all nine of these sculptures were in the park, or even how long they were intended to be in the park. The city of Denver, in their Burns Park Master Plan document, says the sculptures were “intended to be temporary”, but also that the “sculptures had an expected life span of 15 years as originally constructed”. A Westword article about Burns Park says that all nine were supposed to be removed by the end of the summer. The Forakis and Van Buren likely were removed within a year or two. The Morris was in the park in 1976, but was in bad shape and likely didn't last much beyond that. The Mangold was in a similar position, lasting until sometime in the 70s, but was also in bad shape and was torn down rather than repaired. The last sculpture to be removed entirely from Burns Park was Fleming's Magic Cube, after a celebration ceremony was held on December 16, 1995. At some point the remaining sculptures were wrapped in fiberglass and repainted to preserve them, but it's not clear which sculptures were included in that process.

Jazz by Barbara Baer was added to the park on May 23, 1999. This sculpture was made of steel instead of plywood like the originals from 1968. In 2004, the di Benedetto was remade in concrete to replace the original plywood.

Untitled by Anthony Magar, a yellow and white giant bench made of steel, was created in 1968 at the same time as the other sculptures in Burns Park, but it had been a private commission for the nearby Joshel House. After Susanne Joshel died in 2009, the sculpture was donated to the city and placed in Burns Park in 2010.

On August 9, 2014, as part of “Denver Days” celebrations, a one-day event was held at Burns Park called “Experience 1968”. The artists involved were Trine Bumiller, Claudia Mastrobuono, Nicole Banowetz, Matt Scobey, Nikki Pike, and Tara Rynders. Several sculptures were created out of donated cardboard, and were torn down at the end of the event. The city of Denver subsequently released its Burns Park Master Plan, detailing future plans for revamping the park, including adding more sculptures, landforms, terraces, and recreational sites. The only new addition to Burns Park since that time has been a new sidewalk running parallel to Leetsdale Drive.

In 2020, the Kotoske sculpture was damaged by a windstorm and removed. It was remade in steel and placed in the park in 2023.
