= The Red Forest =

Sculpture in Denver, Colorado, U.S.

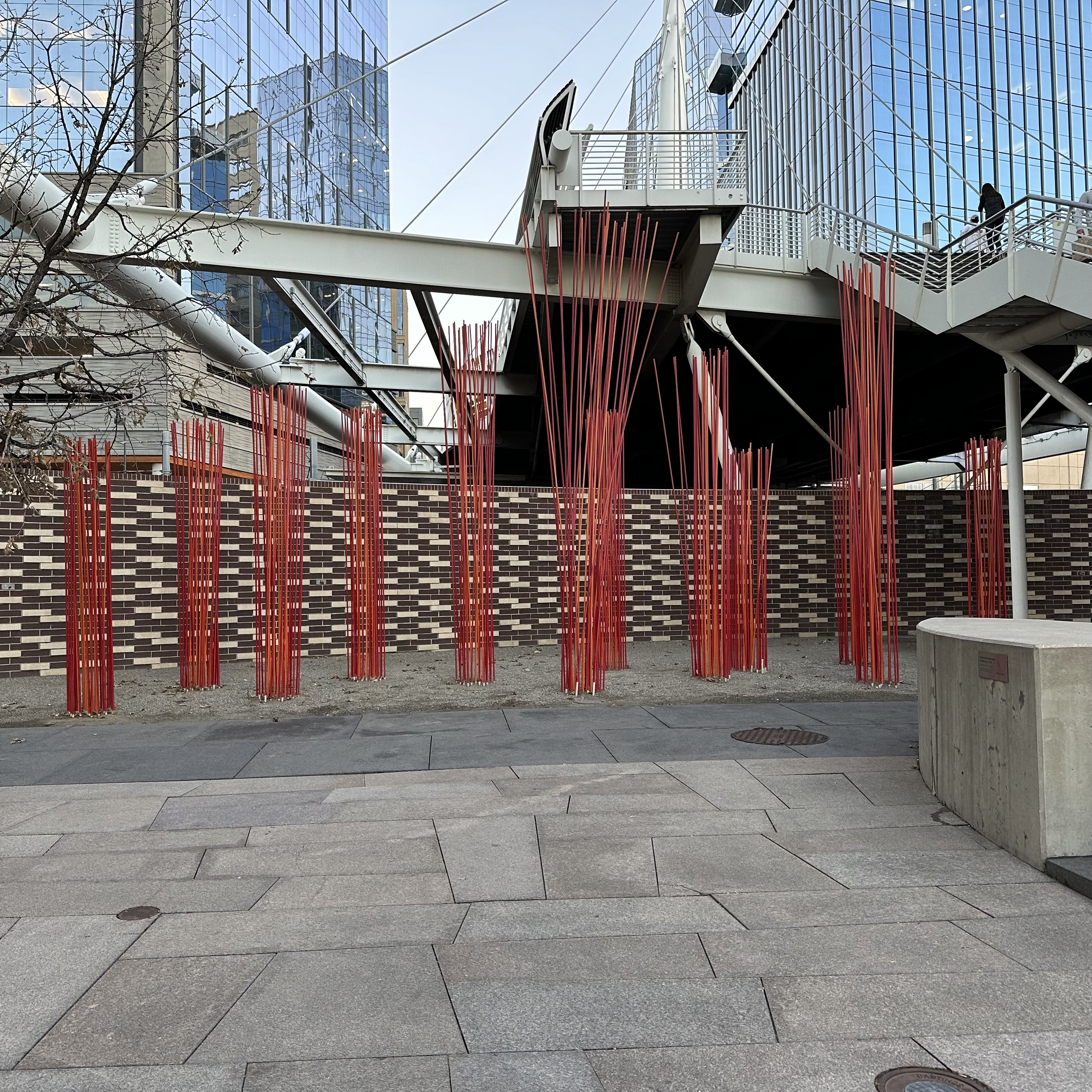
- The sculpture in 2023
- Artist: Konstantin Dimopoulos
- Location: Denver, Colorado, U.S.
- 39.754628°N 105.004229°W

The Red Forest is a sculpture by Konstantin Dimopoulos, installed in Denver, Colorado, United States.
