= Tribute to Elrey Jeppesen =

1994 bronze sculpture of Elrey Borge Jeppesen

- The statue in 2025
- Artist: George Lundeen
- Subject: Elrey Borge Jeppesen
- Location: Denver, Colorado, United States; 39°50′58″N 104°40′26″W

Tribute to Elrey Jeppesen, also known as The Aviator, is a 1994 bronze sculpture of Elrey Borge Jeppesen by American artist George Lundeen, installed at the Denver International Airport, in the U.S. state of Colorado. The statue is 16 feet tall and has been described as "towering".

== See also ==
- 1994 in art
