= Sun Silo =

Sculpture in Denver, Colorado, U.S.

- Artist: Patrick Marold
- Location: Community Park, Denver, Colorado, U.S.
- 39°42′58.5″N 104°54′21.7″W

Sun Silo is a sculpture by Patrick Marold, installed in Denver's Community Park at East Lowry Boulevard and Pontiac Street, in the U.S. state of Colorado.
