= Soft Landing (Snelson) =

Sculpture by Kenneth Snelson in Denver, Colorado, U.S.

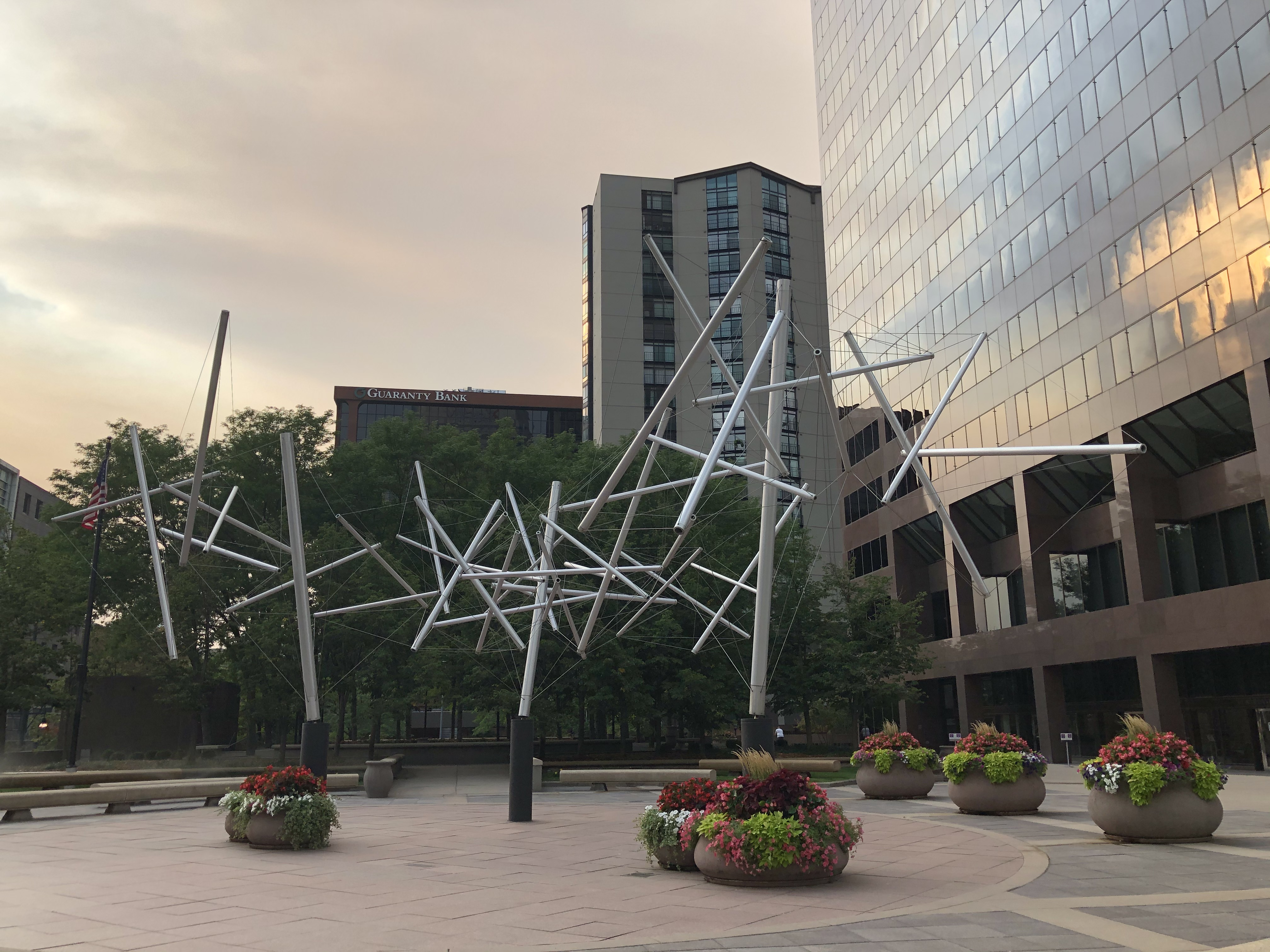
- The sculpture in 2020
- Artist: Kenneth Snelson
- Year: 1982
- Location: Denver, Colorado, U.S.
- 39.749895°N 104.995357°W

Soft Landing is a 1982 sculpture by Kenneth Snelson, installed at Denver's 17th Street Plaza (1225 17th Street), in the U.S. state of Colorado.
