= Statue of Joe P. Martínez =

Sculpture in Denver, Colorado, U.S.

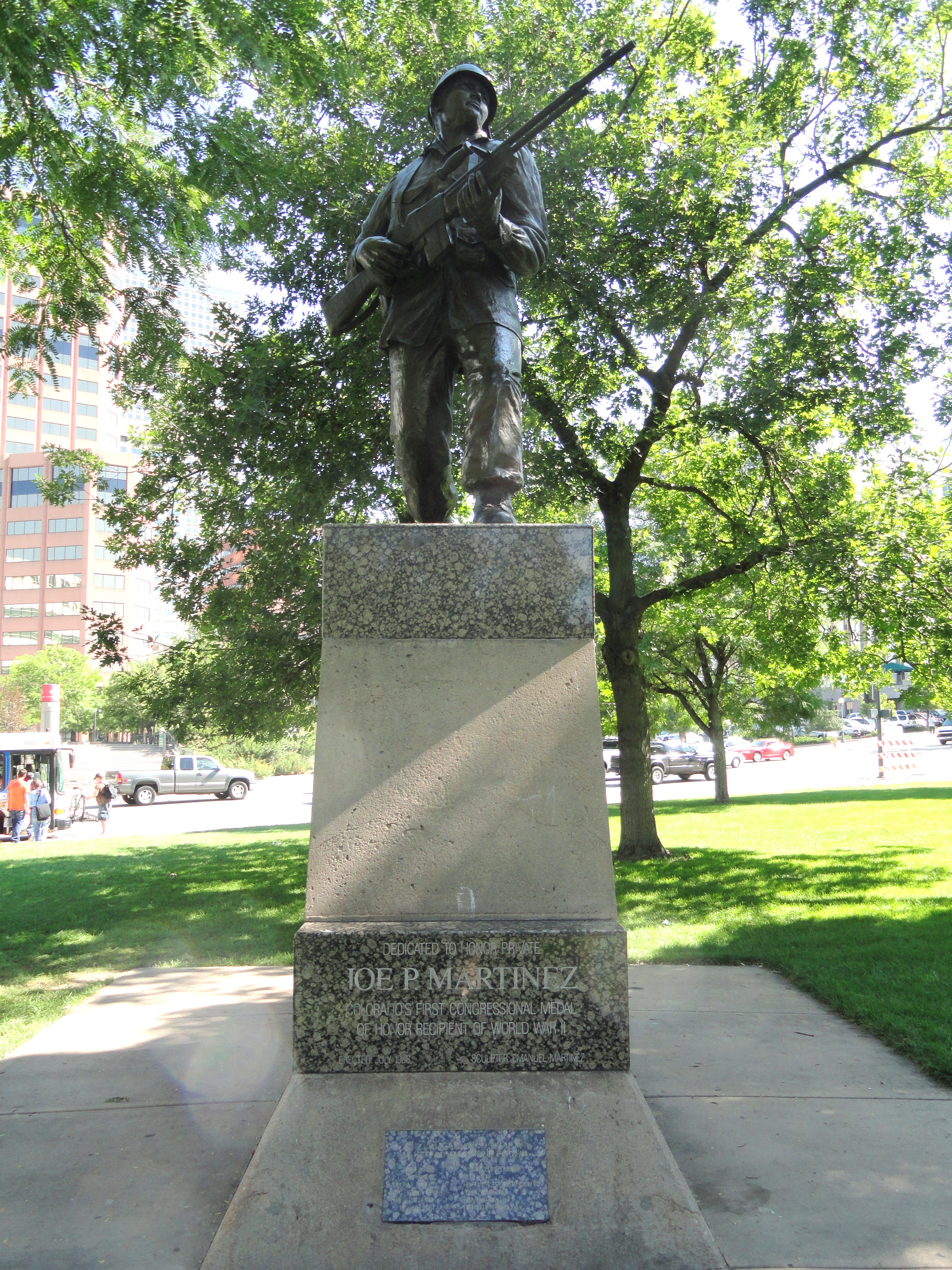
- The statue in 2011
- Medium: Bronze sculpture
- Subject: Joe P. Martínez
- Location: Denver, Colorado, U.S.; 39°44′23″N 104°59′12.3″W

A 20-foot (6.1 m) bronze statue of decorated World War II soldier Joe P. Martínez is installed outside the Colorado State Capitol, in Denver.
