= Liberty Bell (Denver) =

Liberty Bell replica in Denver, Colorado, U.S.

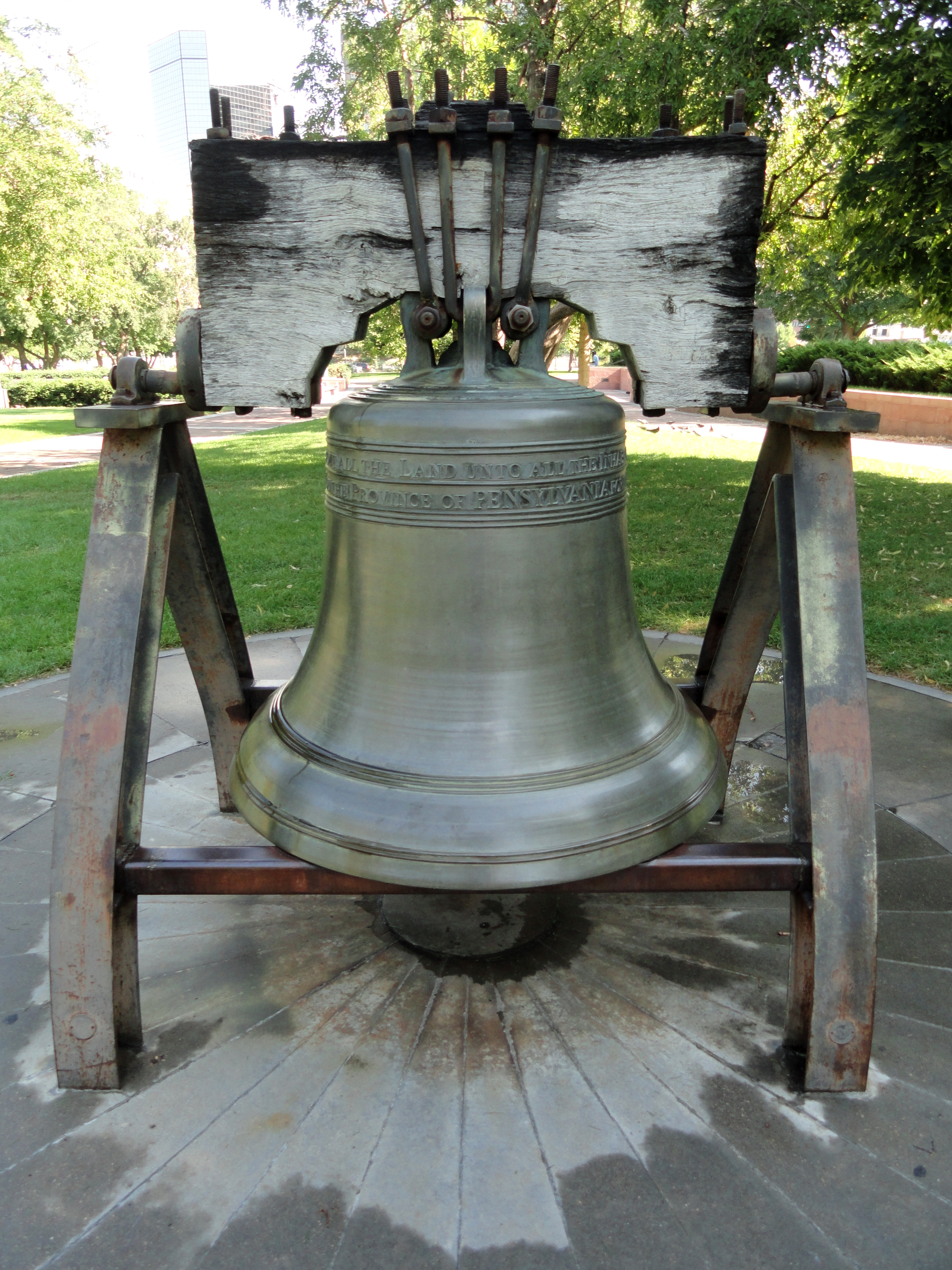
- The replica in Denver's Civic Center Park
- Location: Denver, Colorado, U.S.
- 39.738892°N 104.986731°W

The Liberty Bell in Denver is a replica of the original Liberty Bell, installed outside the Colorado State Capitol. The bell was 1 of 53 replicas cast in France in 1950.
