= Un Corrido Para la Gente =

Sculpture in Denver, Colorado, U.S.

- Artist: Carlos Frésquez
- Location: Denver, Colorado, U.S.
- 39.697344°N 105.053018°W

Un Corrido Para la Gente (English: A Ballad for the People) is a sculpture by Carlos Frésquez, installed in Denver, Colorado, U.S.
