= National Velvet (McEnroe) =

Sculpture in Denver, Colorado, U.S.

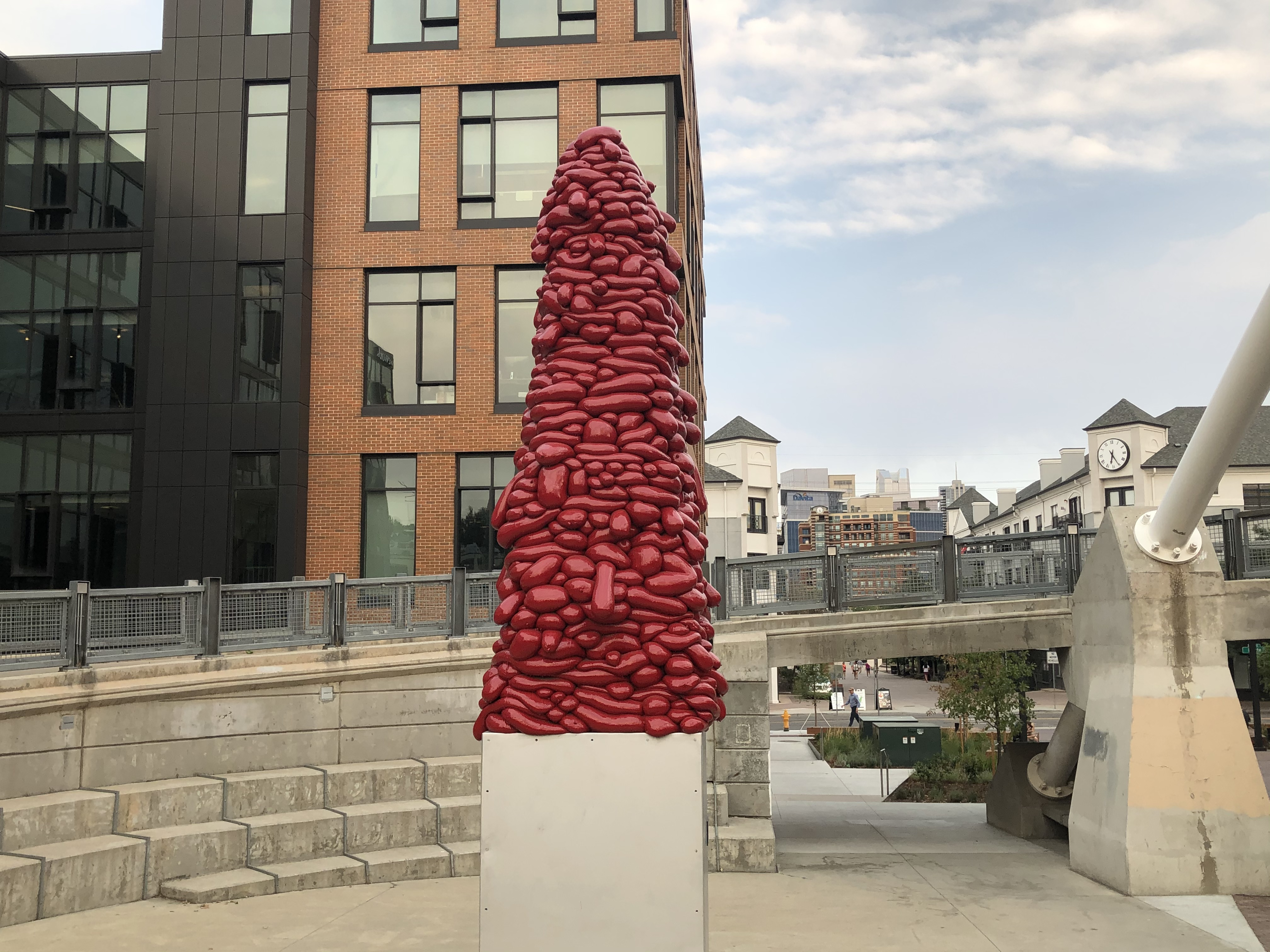
- The sculpture in 2020
- Artist: John McEnroe
- Location: Denver, Colorado, U.S.
- 39°45′28.1″N 105°0′30.3″W

National Velvet is a sculpture by John McEnroe, installed at the base of Denver's 16th Street Pedestrian Bridge, in the U.S. state of Colorado.
