= Civil War Monument (Denver) =

Sculpture in Denver, Colorado, US

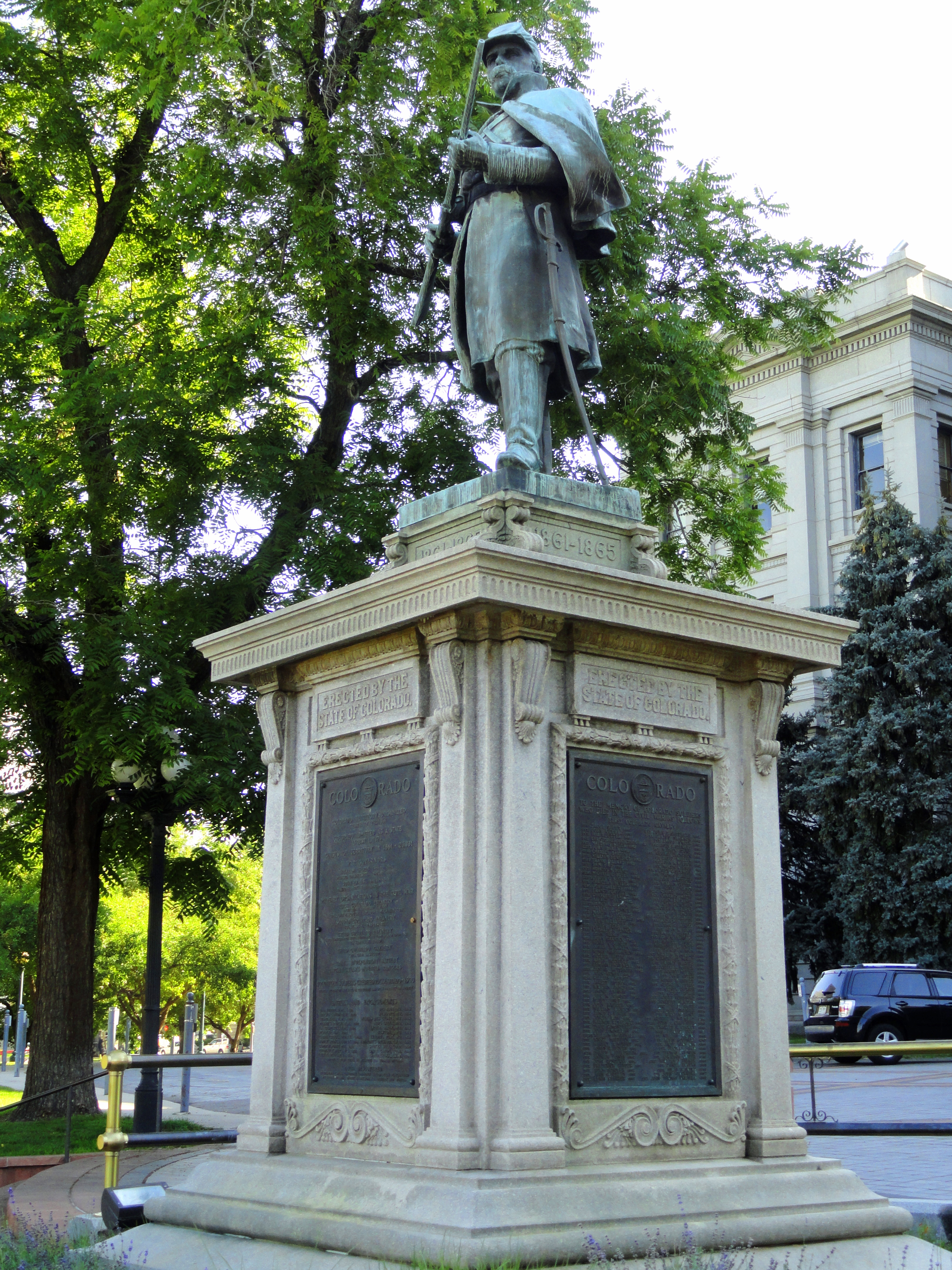
- The statue in 2011
- Artist: Jack Howland
- Year: Dedicated July 24, 1909
- Medium: Bronze; granite
- Location: Denver, Colorado, U.S.
- Coordinates: 39.739235°N 104.985642°W

The Civil War Monument is a statue of a Civil War cavalryman by Jack Howland that was originally installed outside the Colorado State Capitol in Denver. The memorial is also known as the Civil War Memorial, Soldier's Monument, and Civil War Soldier. The work was dedicated on July 24, 1909, after being cast by the Bureau Brothers.

== Description ==
The bronze sculpture depicts a Union Army soldier in raincoat, books, spurs, and hat, holding a rifle and with a sheathed saber. It measures approximately 8 x 4 x 4 ft., and rests on a granite base measuring approximately 10 x 8 x 8 ft.

== History ==
The statue atop the monument was toppled on June 25, 2020. The statue was quickly removed after vandalism and put into storage. The statue reappeared at the History Colorado Center on October 14, 2020. The display at the History Colorado Center is temporary and is currently planned to be on display until at least January 31, 2026. Its permanent fate is currently being debated, with the statue possibly being redisplayed at nearby Lincoln Park, which is already home to another war memorial, or to another site.

== See also ==
- Colorado in the American Civil War
