= Frank Packard =

American architect (1866–1923)

Frank L. Packard
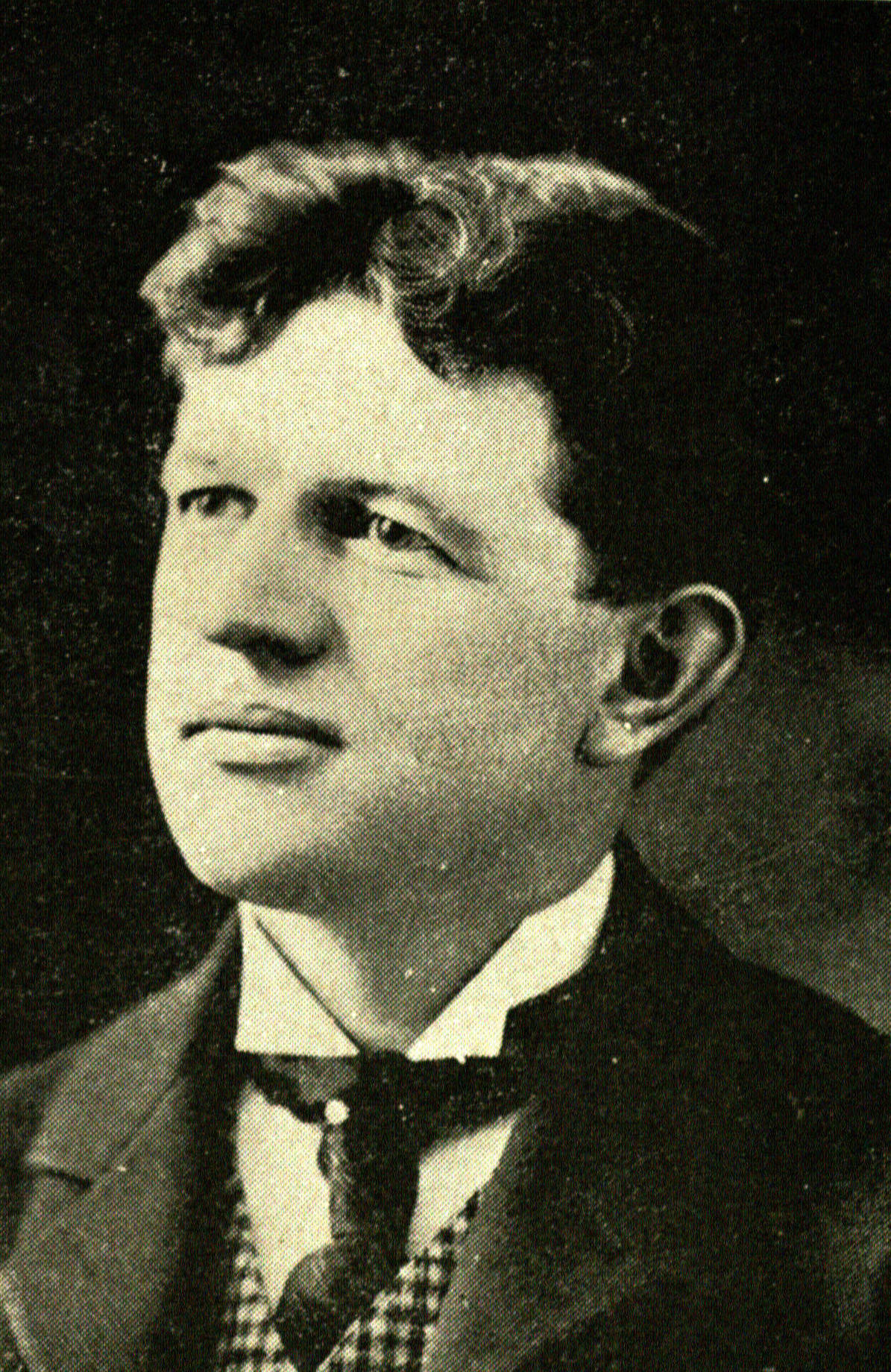
- Frank L. Packard, circa 1896
- Born: June 11, 1866; Delaware, Ohio
- Died: October 26, 1923 (aged 57); Columbus, Ohio
- Occupation: Architect

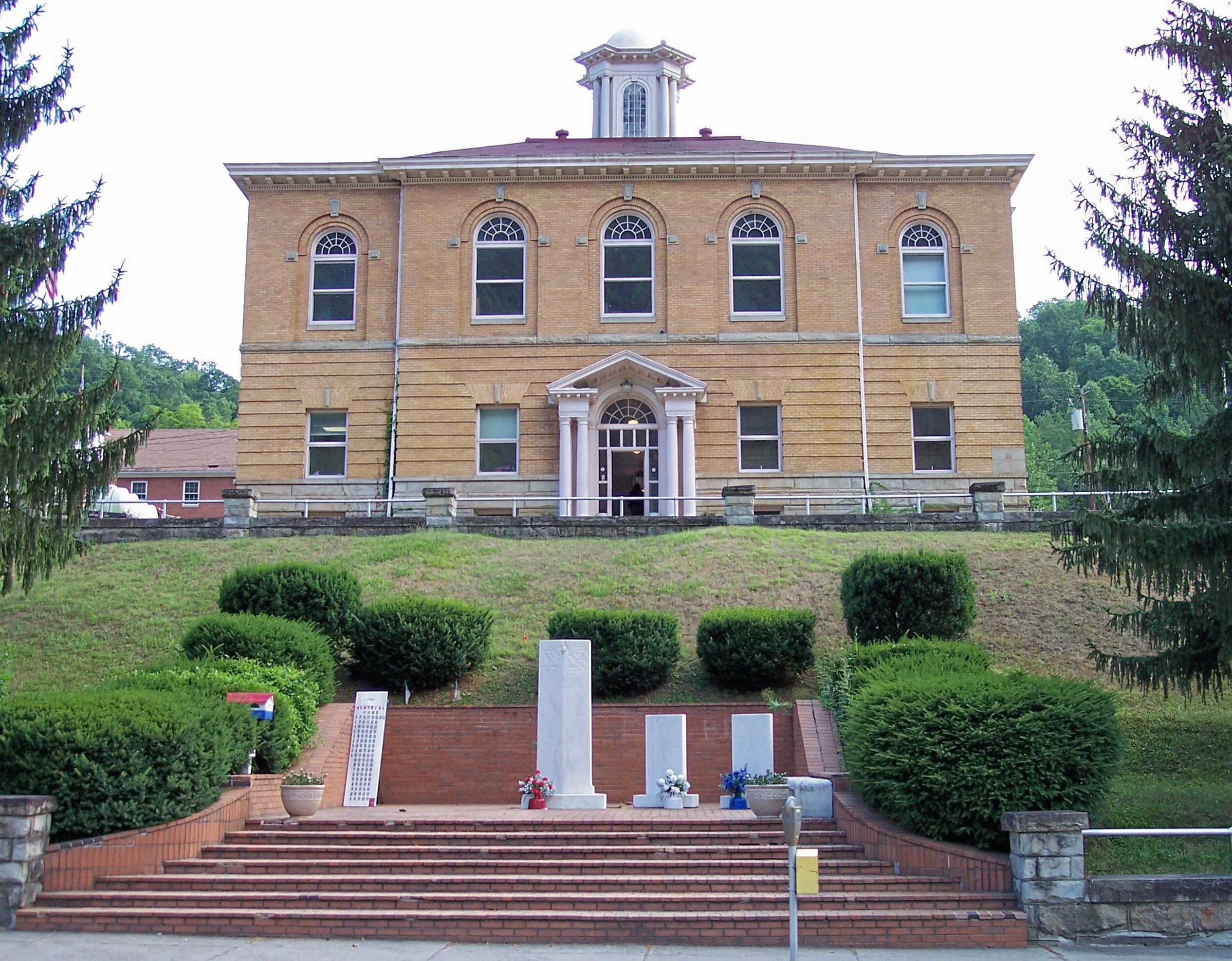
Old Clay County Courthouse in Clay, West Virginia

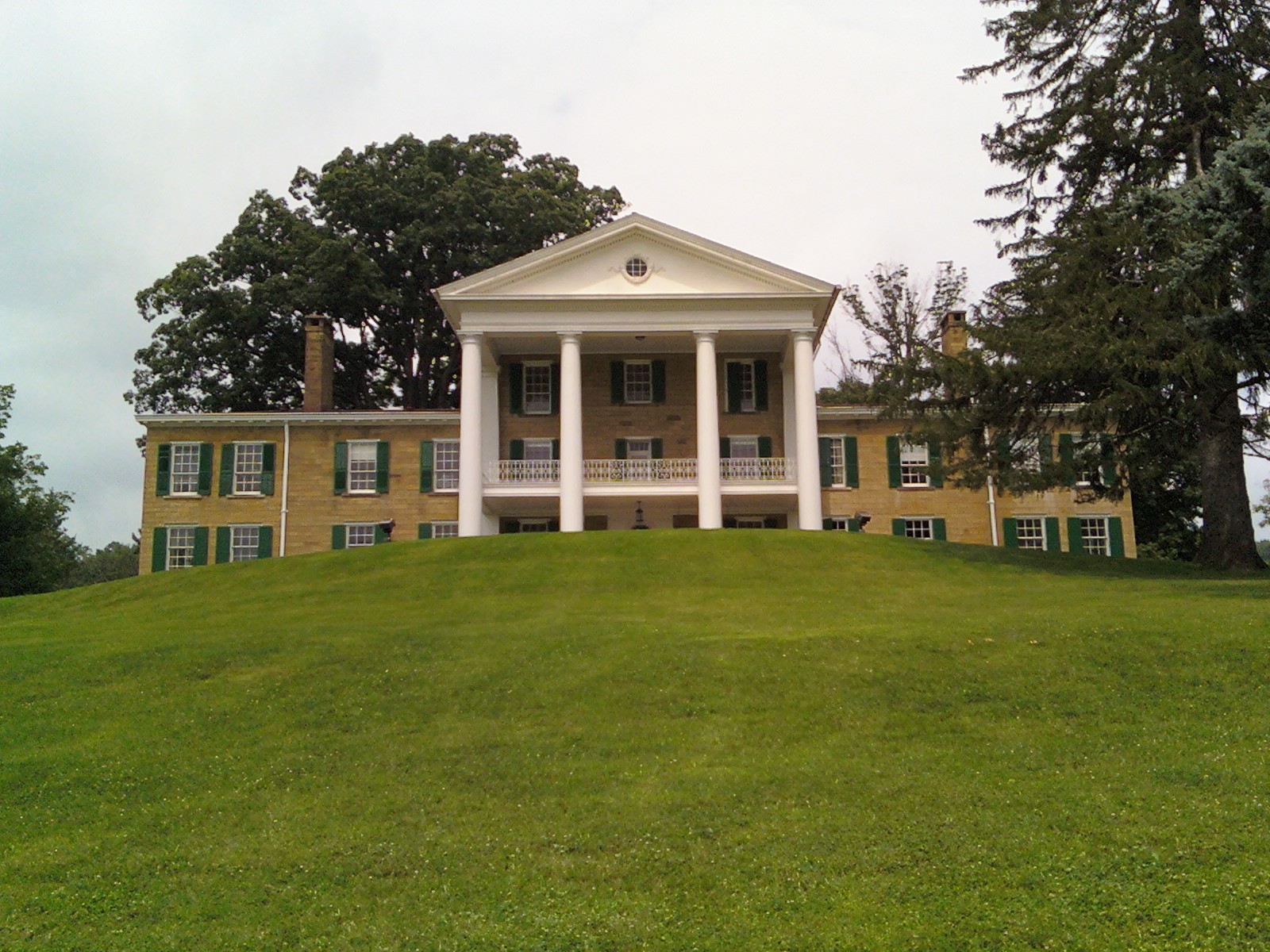
Bryn Du Mansion in Granville, Ohio

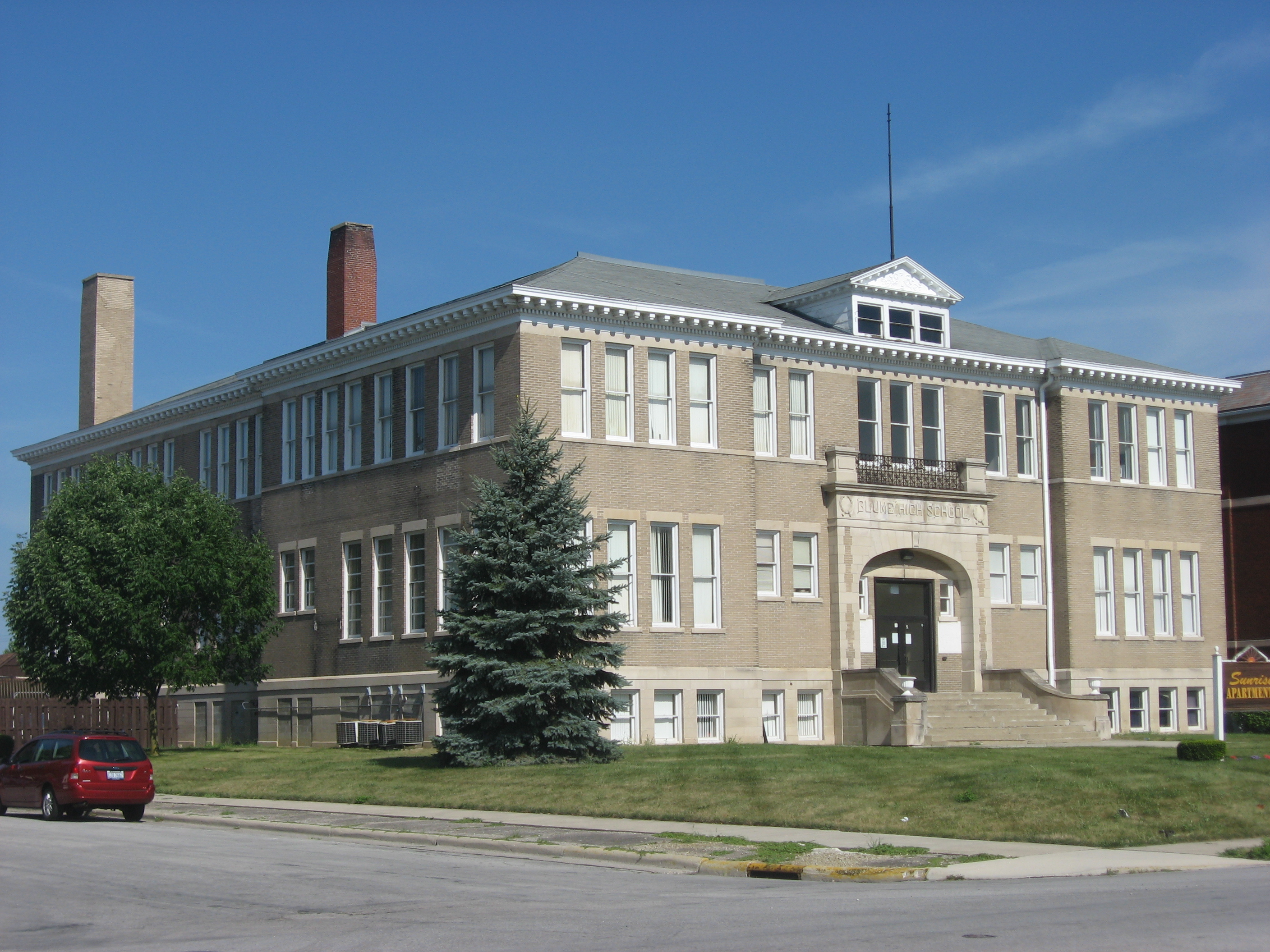
Blume High School in Wapakoneta, Ohio

Frank L. Packard (June 11, 1866 – October 26, 1923) was a prominent architect in Ohio. Many of his works were under the firm Yost & Packard, a company co-owned by Joseph W. Yost.

== Life and career ==
Frank Lucius Packard was born June 11, 1866, in Delaware, Ohio, to Alvaro Harrison Packard and Miranda (Black) Packard. He attended the Delaware public schools and worked as a drafter for local architect and engineer F. A. Gartner. He was further educated at the Ohio State University in Columbus and the Massachusetts Institute of Technology in Boston, graduating from the latter in 1887. After two years working for Babb, Cook & Willard in New York City, he returned to Columbus c. 1889 and opened his own office. In 1892 he merged his office with that of Joseph W. Yost, forming the firm of Yost & Packard. At that time, both architects were engaged in major Ohio State University projects, Packard as architect of Hayes Hall and Yost as the architect of Orton Hall. In 1900 the partnership was dissolved when Yost relocated to New York City. Packard worked as a private practitioner for the remainder of his life.

Packard was active in Republican politics and was well–connected to powerful Republican politicians, including Warren G. Harding. In 1903 Packard was responsible for the design of the large front porch of Harding's Marion residence, the Harding Home, from which he conducted his Front porch campaign in 1920. In 1922 Harding, as President, appointed Packard architect of the United States pavilion at the Independence Centenary International Exposition in Rio de Janeiro in Brazil. This building was designed to be reused as the United States Embassy to Brazil after the fair. Located on what is now Avenida Presidente Wilson, this original building was replaced by a new embassy, now the consulate, in 1952.

Packard joined the American Institute of Architects as a Fellow in 1895. He was among the founders of the Columbus Society of Architects in 1908 and AIA Columbus in 1913. For many years Packard was a member of the Board of Directors of the Columbus Chamber of Commerce. He was president of both organizations for the year 1919-20. At the end of his life Packard was at work on plans for the Columbus Civic Center. Following his death, Packard's associates at AIA Columbus organized the Allied Architects Association to complete the project.

== Personal life ==
Packard was married in 1892 to Eva Lena Elliott of Columbus. They had no children. Packard died suddenly on October 26, 1923, at the age of 57.

He is buried in Green Lawn Cemetery in Columbus, Ohio.

== Legacy ==
In his private practice, Packard was associated with several other professionals, including architect Ralph Snyder, engineer Edward F. Babbitt and superintendent Lorenzo D. Mathews. After Packard's death these associates reorganized the firm as Snyder, Babbitt & Mathews. It became Snyder & Babbitt in 1925 and was dissolved in 1929. Ralph Snyder continued in private practice for at least a few years. Major works by these firms include the Columbus Dispatch Building, built in 1925, and the Huntington National Bank Building, built in 1926.

Many buildings designed by Packard, independently and with Yost, have been listed on the United States National Register of Historic Places. Others contribute to listed historic districts.

The three partners of Richards, McCarty & Bulford, the most prominent architecture firm in Columbus after Packard's death, all worked for Yost & Packard.

== Projects ==
=== Individual projects ===
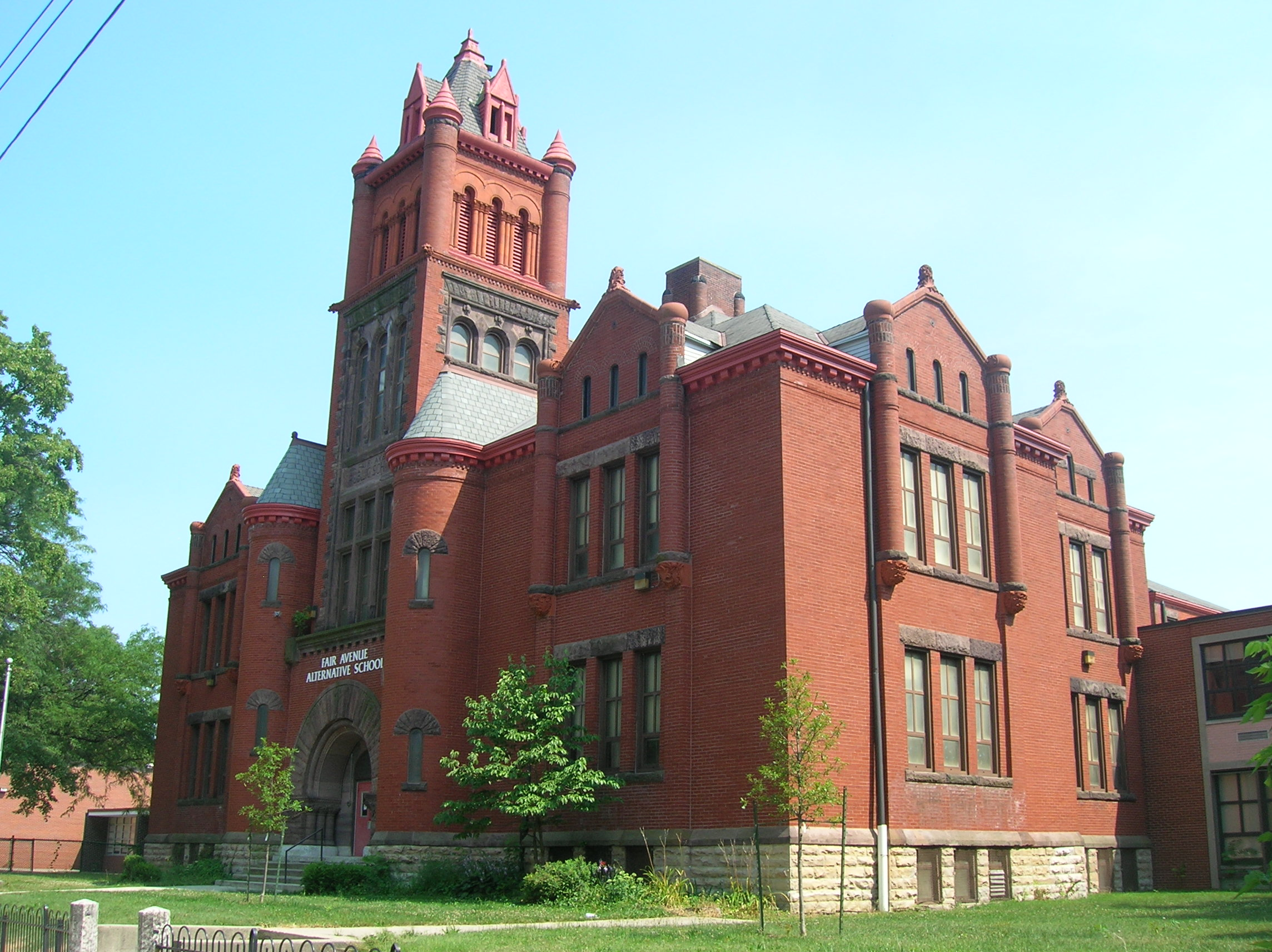
The Fair Avenue School

- Joseph Addison Crowell House, East Ludington St. Iron Mountain, MI, (Spring 1884)
- Shepard Street School, 106 Short St, Gahanna, Ohio (1889, NRHP 1979)*
- Fair Avenue School, 1395 Fair Avenue, Columbus, Ohio (1890)
- Central High School (1862-1928) addition (1891)
- Frank L. Beam house, (Note: A contributing property to the East High Street Historic District, NRHP–listed in 1987.) Mount Vernon, Ohio (1900–01)
- Clay County Courthouse (former), Main St, Clay, West Virginia (1902, NRHP 1979)
- Ellis Hall, (Note: A contributing property to the Ohio University Campus Green Historic District, NRHP–listed in 1979.) Ohio University, Athens, Ohio (1902 et seq.)
- Huntington Chapel, Green Lawn Cemetery, Columbus, Ohio (1902)
- William C. Miller house, (Note: A contributing property to the Hudson Avenue Historic District, NRHP–listed in 1987.) 473 Hudson Ave, Newark, Ohio (1902)
- Monnett Memorial M. E. Chapel, 999 OH–98, Bucyrus, Ohio (1902–04, NRHP 1986)
- Columbus Savings and Trust Building, 8 E Long St, Columbus, Ohio (1904–05, NRHP 1977)
- Charles H. Lindenberg house, (Note: Later the Ohio Governor's Mansion, and presently (2022) home to the Columbus Foundation. A contributing property to the East Broad Street Historic District, NRHP–listed in 1987.) 1234 E Broad St, Columbus, Ohio (1904, NRHP 1972)
- Scripps Hall, Ohio University, Athens, Ohio (1904)
- Bryn Du Mansion, (Note: Originally built as an Italianate villa in 1865 and comprehensively remodeled by Packard for businessman John Sutphin Jones over a three year period.) 537 Jones Rd, Granville, Ohio (1905–08, NRHP 1982)
- Franklin County Memorial Hall, 280 E Broad St, Columbus, Ohio (1905–06)
- Robert H. Jeffrey house, 165 N Parkview Ave, Bexley, Ohio (1905)
- Capitol Trust Company Building, 8 E. Broad St., Columbus, Ohio (1906)
- Joseph F. Firestone House, 1266 East Broad Street, Columbus, Ohio (1906, demolished)
- Columbus Gas and Fuel Company, 135 N. Front St., Columbus, Ohio (1906, demolished)
- East Broad Street Presbyterian Church alterations, (Note: Originally designed by Columbus architect Elah Terrell in 1887.) 760 E Broad St, Columbus, Ohio (1907–08, NRHP 1987)
- Richard Caslow house, (Note: A contributing property to the Columbus Street Historic District, NRHP–listed in 1988.) 116 E Columbus St, Canal Winchester, Ohio (1908)
- Alumni Hall, Miami University, Oxford, Ohio (1909–10)
- William H. Thomas house, (Note: A contributing property to the Bramwell Historic District, NRHP–listed in 1983.) 406 Duhring Ave, Bramwell, West Virginia (1909–12)
- Bishop Hall, Miami University, Oxford, Ohio (1911–12)
- Gordy Hall, Ohio University, Athens, Ohio (1911)
- Morton Hall, Ohio University, Athens, Ohio (1911, demolished)
- Brown Chapel, (Note: A contributing property to the Muskingum College Campus Historic District, NRHP–listed in 1979.) Muskingum University, New Concord, Ohio (1912)
- Mitchell Hall, Wilberforce University (former campus), Wilberforce, Ohio (1912, destroyed 1974)
- Putnam County Courthouse, 245 E Main St, Ottawa, Ohio (1912, NRHP 1974)
- Emery Hall, Wilberforce University (former campus), (Note: Part of Central State University since Wilberforce University's move to a new campus in 1967.) Wilberforce, Ohio (1913, NRHP 2005)
- Tupper Hall, Ohio University, Athens, Ohio (1913)
- Thomas C. Miller Public School, (Note: Designed in association with supervising architect R. A. Gillis of Fairmont.) 2 Pennsylvania Ave, Fairmont, West Virginia (1914, NRHP 2013)
- Athletic Club of Columbus, (Note: As consulting architect to Richards, McCarty & Bulford.) 136 E Broad St, Columbus, Ohio (1915, NRHP 2011)
- Clark County Memorial Hall, 300 W Main St, Springfield, Ohio (1915–16, demolished 2010)
- Lindley Hall, Ohio University, Athens, Ohio (1915)
- Masonic Temple, (Note: Designed in association with supervising architect Theodore T. Sansbury of Parkersburg. A contributing property to the Avery Street Historic District, NRHP–listed in 1986.) 900 Market St, Parkersburg, West Virginia (1915, NRHP 1982)
- Holzer Hospital (former), (Note: A contributing property to the Gallipolis Historic District, NRHP–listed in 1980.) 553 Second Ave, Gallipolis, Ohio (1916–17)
- Bundy Hall, Wilberforce University (former campus), Wilberforce, Ohio (1917, destroyed 1974)
- Parkersburg High School, (Note: A contributing property to the Parkersburg High School–Washington Avenue Historic District, NRHP–listed in 1992.) 2101 Dudley Ave, Parkersburg, West Virginia (1917)
- Seneca Hotel, (Note: Designed in association with David Riebel & Sons of Columbus.) 367 E Broad St, Columbus, Ohio (1917, NRHP 1983)
- Montgomery Hall, Muskingum University, New Concord, Ohio (1921)
- O'Shaughnessy Dam, Glick Rd, Dublin, Ohio (1922–25, NRHP 1990)
- United States Embassy, Av Presidente Wilson 147, Rio de Janeiro, Brazil (1922, demolished)
- Bentley Hall, Ohio University, Athens, Ohio (1923–24)
- Blume High School additions (former), 409 S Blackhoof St, Wapakoneta, Ohio (1923–25, NRHP 1996)
- Granville Inn, (Note: A contributing property to the Granville Historic District, NRHP–listed in 1980.) 314 E Broadway, Granville, Ohio (1923–24)
- Hocking County Courthouse, (Note: A contributing property to the Logan Historic District, NRHP–listed in 2010.) 5 E Main St, Logan, Ohio (1923–25)
- North High School, 100 E Arcadia Ave, Columbus, Ohio (1923–24, NRHP 1987)
- Yuster Building, 150 E Broad St, Columbus, Ohio (1923–24, NRHP 2017)

=== Snyder, Babbitt & Mathews and Snyder & Babbitt ===
- Columbus Dispatch Building, (Note: Designed in association with Harvey H. Hiestand of Columbus.) 34 S 3rd St, Columbus, Ohio (1925)
- Huntington National Bank Building, 17 S High St, Columbus, Ohio (1926)

== See also ==
- Architecture of Columbus, Ohio
