= Yuster =

Yuster is a surname. Notable people with the surname include:

- Raphael Yuster, Israeli mathematician
- Rose Yuster, American anarchist, member of No Conscription League
- Sarah Yuster (born 1957), American painter

== See also ==
- Tan Yuster, fictional character in Star Wars series, Padawan of Agen Kolar
- Yuster Building, eight-story Gothic inspired commercial building in Columbus, Ohio
