= Bishop Hall =

Bishop Hall may refer to:

== People ==
- Joseph Hall (bishop) (1574–1656), English bishop, satirist and moralist
- Ronald Hall (1890–1975), Anglican bishop

== Buildings ==
- Bishop Hall Jubilee School, Hong Kong
- Hatfield College, originally called Bishop Hatfield's Hall
- Bishop Hall (Miami University)
