= Masonic Temple (Parkersburg, West Virginia) =

- U.S. National Register of Historic Places
- U.S. Historic district – Contributing property
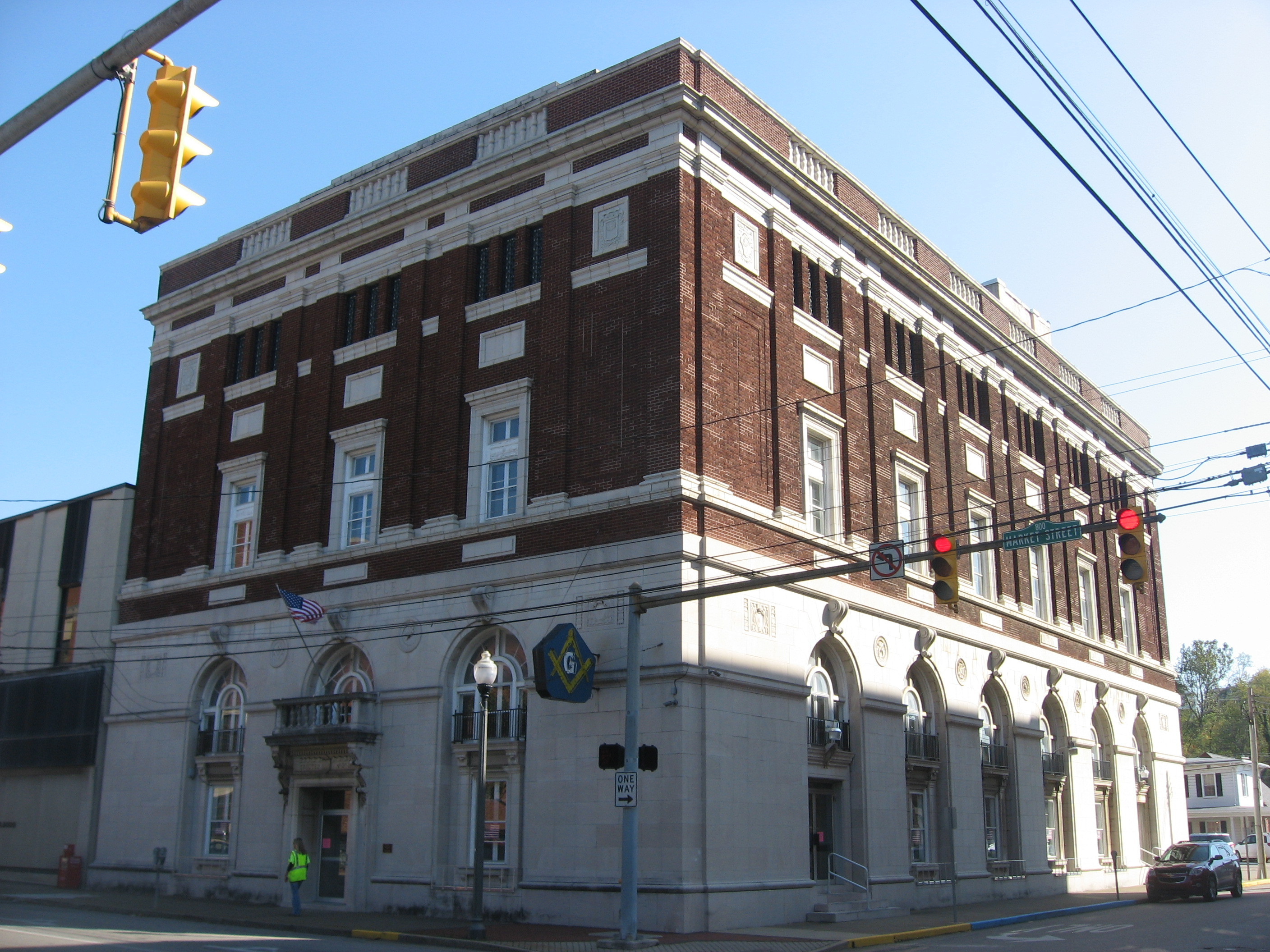
- Front and southern side

- Location within West Virginia Location within the United States
- Location: 900 Market St., Parkersburg, West Virginia
- Coordinates: 39°16′4″N 81°33′22″W
- Area: less than one acre
- Built: 1915
- Architect: Frank Packard; Theodore T. Sansbury
- Architectural style: Classical Revival
- Part of: Avery Street Historic District (ID86000849)
- MPS: Downtown Parkersburg MRA
- NRHP reference No.: 82001779
- Added to NRHP: October 8, 1982

The Masonic Temple is a historic Masonic Lodge building located at Parkersburg, Wood County, West Virginia. It was built in 1915, and is a three-story, three-bay wide, red brick building with stone trim in the Classical Revival style. It features elliptical bays flanking the central bay on the front facade. The building was designed by Columbus architect Frank Packard with local supervising architect Theodore T. Sansbury.

It was listed on the National Register of Historic Places in 1982, and it is a contributing property to the Avery Street Historic District, which was designated and listed on the National Register in 1986.

== See also ==
- National Register of Historic Places listings in Wood County, West Virginia
