= Putnam County Courthouse =

Putnam County Courthouse may refer to:

- Putnam County Courthouse (Florida), Palatka, Florida
- Putnam County Courthouse (Georgia), Eatonton, Georgia, one of Georgia's county courthouses
- Putnam County Courthouse (Illinois), Hennepin, Illinois
- Putnam County Courthouse (New York), Carmel, New York
- Putnam County Courthouse (Ohio), Ottawa, Ohio
- Putnam County Courthouse (West Virginia), Winfield, West Virginia
