= Blume High School =

- U.S. National Register of Historic Places
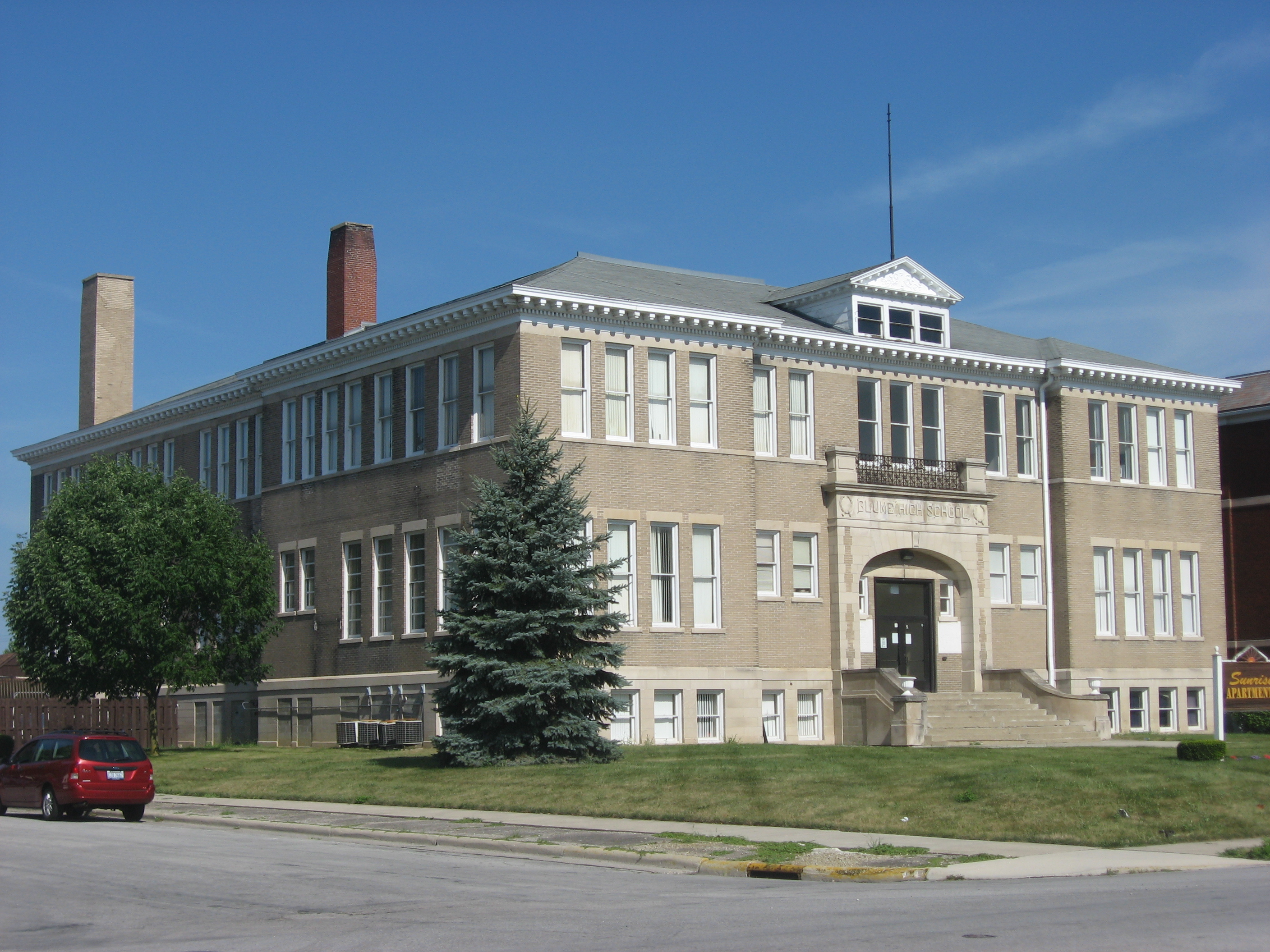
- Front of the school

- Location within Ohio Location within the United States
- Location: 405-409 S. Blackhoof St., Wapakoneta, Ohio
- Coordinates: 40°33′58″N 84°11′50″W
- Area: 2 acres (0.81 ha)
- Built: 1908; 1923-25
- Architect: William M. Runkle; Frank L. Packard
- Architectural style: Mixed
- NRHP reference No.: 96000933
- Added to NRHP: August 22, 1996

The former Blume High School is a historic building in downtown Wapakoneta, Ohio, United States. It was the first exclusive home of Wapakoneta High School. Prior to that time, WHS was housed with other grades.

The original part of the high school was built at a cost of $41,315. This original section was designed by local architect William M. Runkle. In the mid-1920s, it was expanded with the construction of a gymnasium, a library, and the "Red Brick Section" addition; while the last portion was built with money raised from bonds, the library and gym were financed with a bequest from L.N. Blume. These additions were designed by Frank Packard of Columbus.

Growth in the Wapakoneta City School District resulted in overcrowding by the mid-1950s. After a series of failed attempts, the school board succeeded in winning voter approval for the construction of a new school in 1956, and the new Wapakoneta High School building, which today serves as the Wapakoneta Middle School, opened at the beginning of 1959. Blume was converted into a junior high school for several years, but a 1988 vote resulted in the school's closing by 1990.

In 1996, the former Blume High School was listed on the National Register of Historic Places because of its architecture.It has since been converted to apartments.

== Notable alumni ==
- Neil Armstrong (1947) - NASA astronaut, first man to walk on the Moon
- Dudley Nichols (1913) - Oscar-winning screenwriter and director
