= First Presbyterian Church (Parkersburg, West Virginia) =

Historic church in West Virginia, United States

- First Presbyterian Church/Calvary Temple Evangelical Church
- U.S. National Register of Historic Places
- U.S. Historic district – Contributing property
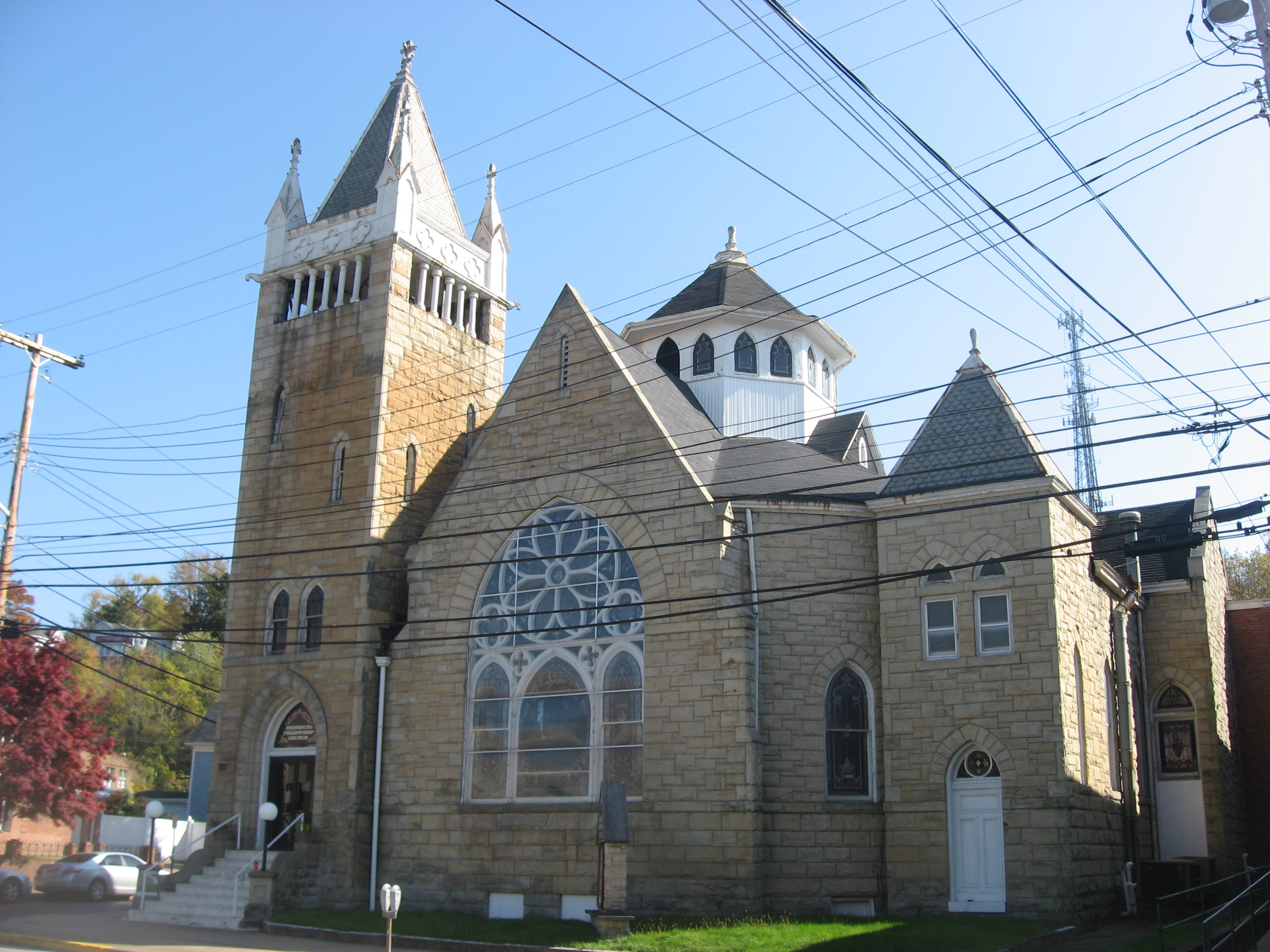
- Front of the church

- Location within West Virginia Location within the United States
- Location: 946 Market St., Parkersburg, West Virginia
- Coordinates: 39°16′8″N 81°33′16″W
- Area: 0.3 acres (0.12 ha)
- Built: 1894
- Architect: Crapsey & Brown; Higgs, John S.
- Architectural style: Romanesque, Gothic Revival
- Part of: Avery Street Historic District (ID86000849)
- MPS: Downtown Parkersburg MRA
- NRHP reference No.: 82001775
- Added to NRHP: December 10, 1982

First Presbyterian Church, also known as the Calvary Temple Evangelical Church and St. Patrick's Priory Church, is a historic church at 946 Market Street in Parkersburg, Wood County, West Virginia. It was built in 1894, and is a two-story, brick and stone church building in a combined Romanesque / Gothic Revival style. It features a corner bell tower.

It was listed on the National Register of Historic Places in 1982, and it is a contributing property to the Avery Street Historic District, which was designated and listed on the National Register in 1986.

Since 2016, the church building has been home to St. Patrick's Anglican Church, a congregation of the Missionary Diocese of All Saints in the Anglican Church in North America.

== See also ==
- National Register of Historic Places listings in Wood County, West Virginia
