= Clinton DeWeese Firestone mansion =

Building in Columbus, Ohio, US

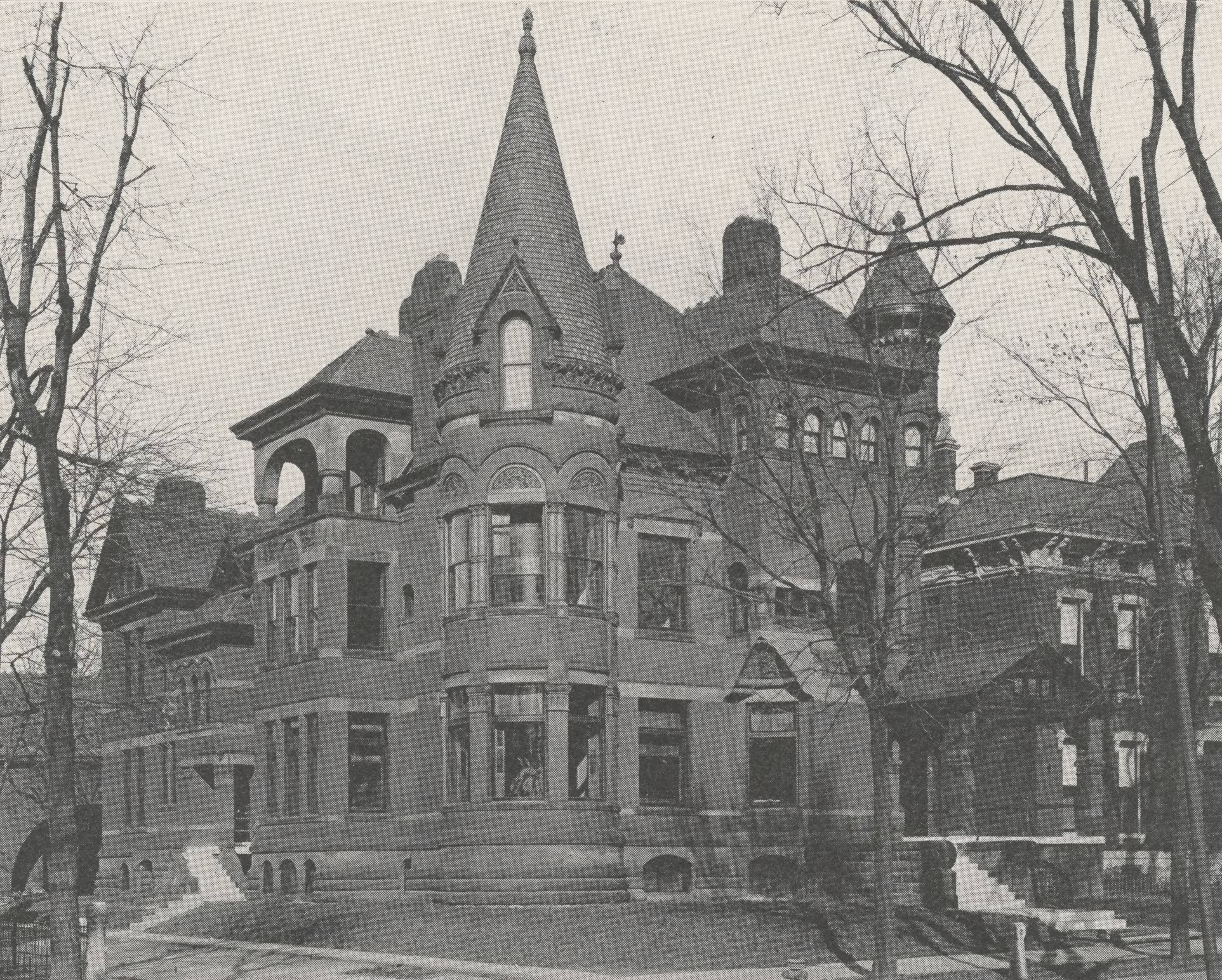
- The house in 1915
- Approximate location of the home

General information
- Architectural style: Romanesque Revival
- Location: 580 East Broad Street, Columbus, Ohio
- Coordinates: 39.9643°N 82.9852°W
- Completed: 1887
- Demolished: 1962

The Clinton DeWeese Firestone mansion was a historic house on East Broad Street in modern-day Downtown Columbus, Ohio.

== History ==
The mansion was built for Clinton DeWeese Firestone, founder of the Columbus Buggy Company, which at one time was the largest manufacturer of light buggies in the world. The mansion became a symbol of his successful business, with elaborate architecture and unique red terracotta trim.

The house was completed in 1887, during a time when Romanesque Revival architecture was popular in Columbus. The Firestone family lived in the house until c. 1913; Firestone died in February 1914. The building was used by the Columbus Life Insurance Company from 1915 to 1942, when it moved into a new building on Broad Street (now home to the Capital University Law School). The structure became offices for the Buckete Union Casualty company, operating there until 1960. The house was demolished by February 1962. A muffler and brakes shop occupies the property today.

== See also ==
- Joseph F. Firestone House
- List of demolished buildings and structures in Columbus, Ohio
