= Parkersburg High School–Washington Avenue Historic District =

Historic district in West Virginia, United States

- U.S. National Register of Historic Places
- U.S. Historic district
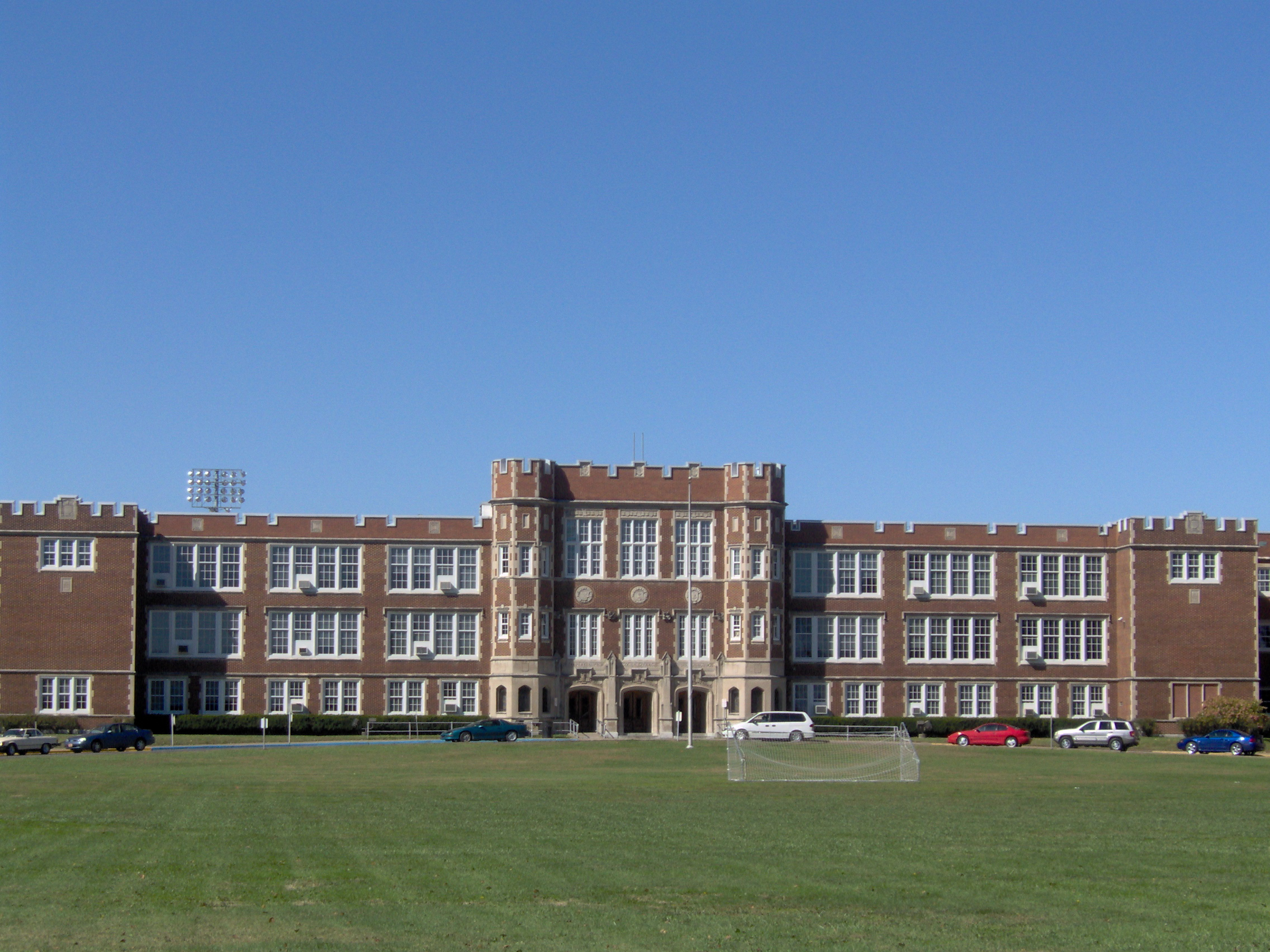
- Parkersburg High School, October 2006

- Location within West Virginia Location within the United States
- Location: Washington Ave. from Park Ave. to Dudley Ave., including 2101 Dudley, Parkersburg, West Virginia
- Coordinates: 39°16′34″N 81°32′23″W
- Area: 64 acres (26 ha)
- Architect: Frank Packard; Et al.
- Architectural style: Colonial Revival, Late Gothic Revival, Tudor Revival
- NRHP reference No.: 92000895
- Added to NRHP: July 16, 1992

Parkersburg High School–Washington Avenue Historic District, is a national historic district located at Parkersburg, Wood County, West Virginia. The Parkersburg High School was built in 1917 north of the Avery Street Historic District in the Jacobethan Revival style. It was designed by Ohio architect Frank Packard (1866-1923).

It was listed to the National Register of Historic Places in 1992.

== See also ==
- National Register of Historic Places listings in Wood County, West Virginia
