= Fair Avenue Elementary School =

Historic school building in Columbus, Ohio

- U.S. Historic district – Contributing property
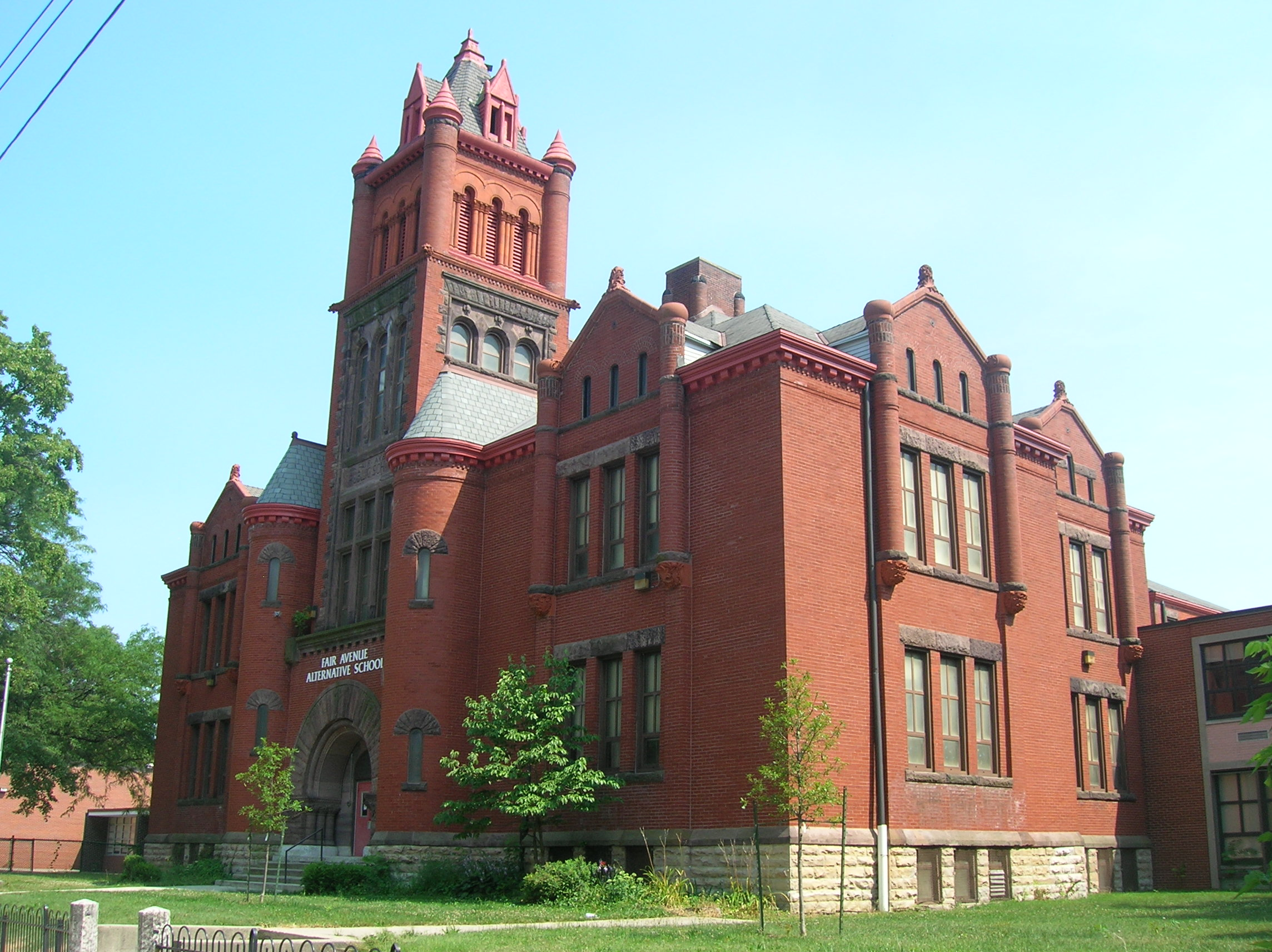
- Interactive map of Fair Avenue Elementary School
- Location: 1395 Fair Avenue, Columbus, Ohio
- Coordinates: 39.963374°N 82.962913°W
- Built: 1889-1890
- Architect: Frank Packard
- Architectural style: Richardsonian Romanesque
- Part of: Columbus Near East Side District (ID78002063)

The Fair Avenue Elementary School is a historic school building in the Franklin Park neighborhood of Columbus, Ohio. The building contributes to the Columbus Near East Side District, on the National Register of Historic Places. It was built in the Richardsonian Romanesque style in 1890, having been designed by prolific Columbus architect Frank Packard. The building, originally housing a school as part of the Columbus Public School District, currently houses one of three campuses of the A+ Arts Academy.

== History ==
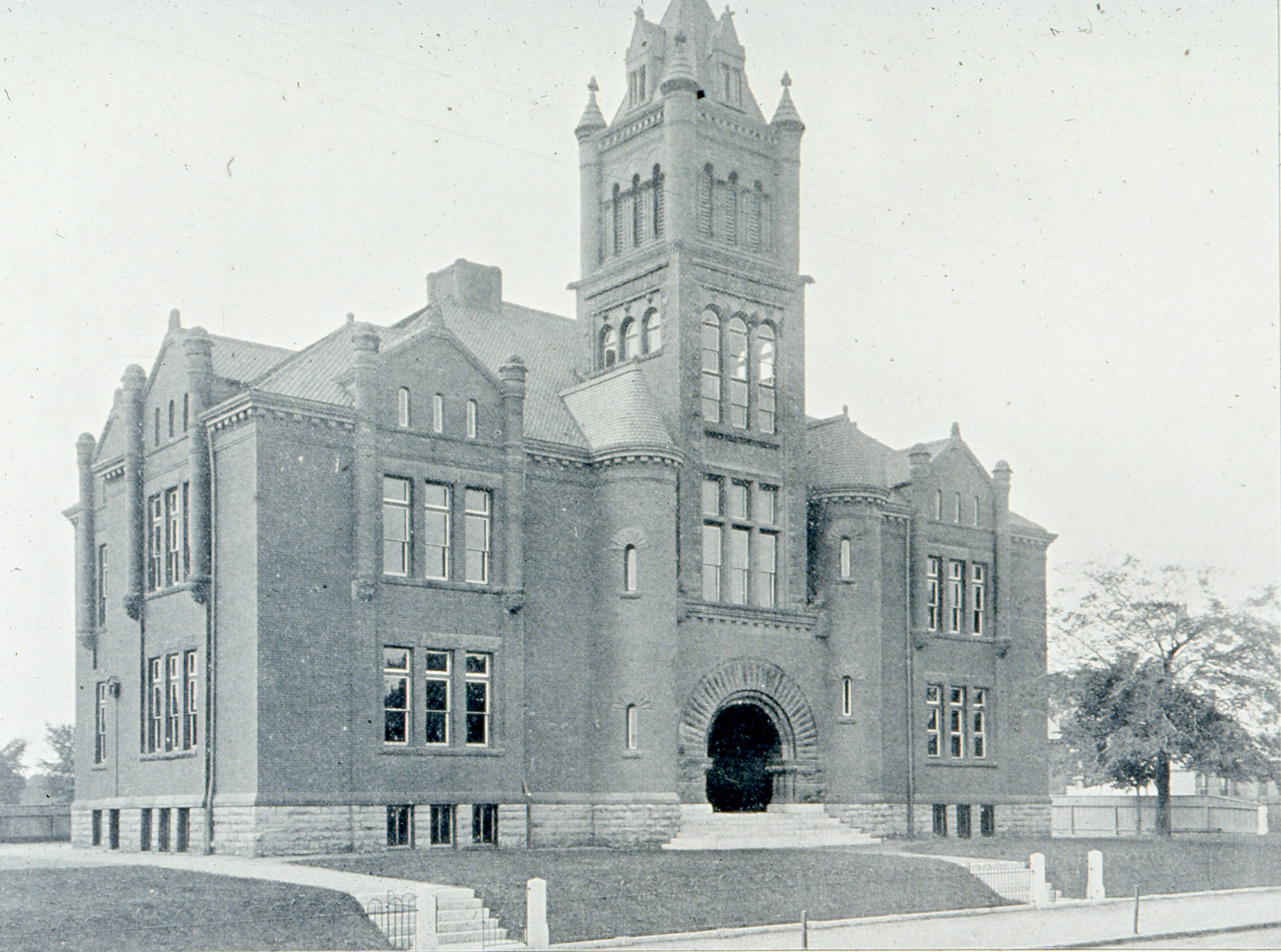
The school c. 1897

The Fair Avenue School was built at a time of significant population growth in Columbus. Following the American Civil War, an influx of new residents led the school board to construct new schools nearly every year. The Fair Avenue School was built from 1889 to 1890; contracts were let in 1889 and architect Frank Packard was chosen to design the building. His fee was $672, remarkably low even though the board was considering hiring a school architect in order to save costs. The building's commission reportedly caused the board to question its decision, leading them to hire David Riebel as the first school architect. The building cost $32,692. The school celebrated its 50th anniversary in 1942 with a reunion event for alumni.

In 1967, a crude fire bomb was thrown into the school building, though it detonated without serious damage.

In 2012, the vacant school building was put up for sale. It was purchased for $300,000 by the A+ Arts Academy, a charter school, in 2013.

The building's exterior remains nearly unchanged in appearance since when it was constructed, though small wings or additions have been added at least seven times, including in 1900, 1957, and 1963.

== Architecture ==
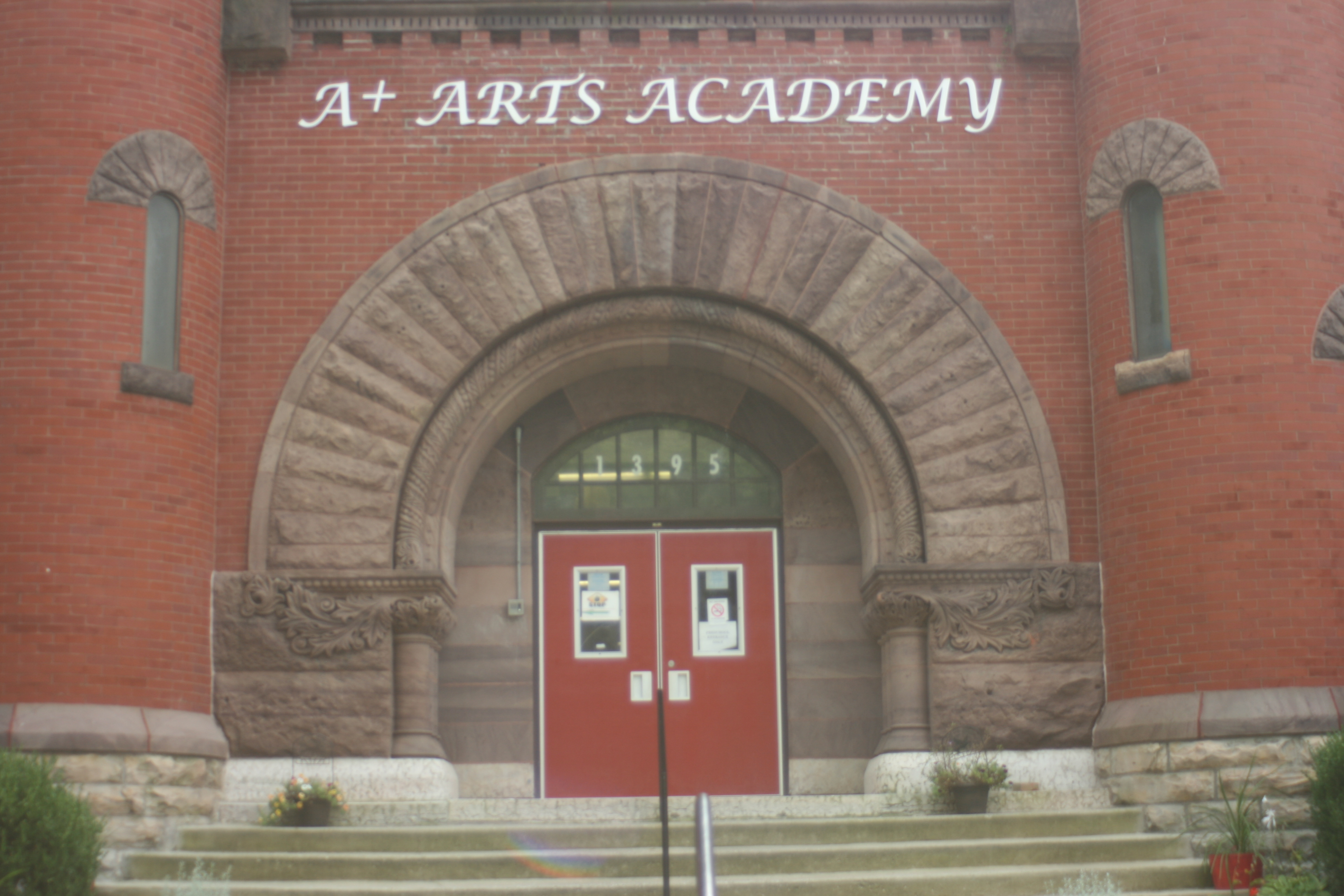
Entranceway arch

The building was designed by prolific Columbus-area architect Frank Packard, built shortly before his partnership with Joseph W. Yost. AIA Columbus indicated it is one of several buildings that proves his competence as an architect before and after his partnership with Yost. The building was included in Yost & Packard's Portfolio of Architectural Realities. Packard chose the style, then his reigning favorite, as it began to decline in popularity (lasting from c. 1875 to 1890). The building is still often considered the best local example of this style.

The Fair Avenue School makes use of elements of Romanesque Revival architecture; it is considered a "prime late example" of the Richardsonian Romanesque style. The exterior predominantly has walls of red brick, a hipped slate roof with a low pitch, and carved stone details throughout. It is a rigidly symmetrical building with a feeling of solidity and bulk. The exterior wall spaces are only lightly taken up by doors and windows; towers, turrets, and arches typical of the Richardsonian style are abundant.

The main block of the building is rectangular, with two stories topped by a hipped roof. The roof is intersected by projecting gable-roofed wall dormers, each of which has triple rectangular windows and heavy stone lintels and sills on the first and second floors. Round brick turrets flank these windows on the second floor, with carved stone corbels at the base and spherical knobs at the top.

The building's tall central tower is its main feature. At its base is the main entranceway, recessed and underneath a heavy stone arch. The arch rests on a rusticated stone base, with foliage details carved into a portion of it, alongside several stubby colonnettes. The tower's second- and third-floor windows are framed in stone; between these is a panel bearing the school's original name. The top floor of the tower, a belfry, has round-arched louvered openings, separated by thin colonnettes and flanked by four round conical-roofed turrets. The tower's pyramidal roof contains a gable-roofed dormer at each of its four sides. The tower is flanked by two turrets with partially conical roofs.

== See also ==
- National Register of Historic Places listings in Columbus, Ohio
- Schools in Columbus, Ohio
