= Monnett Memorial M. E. Chapel =

Historic church in Ohio, United States

- U.S. National Register of Historic Places
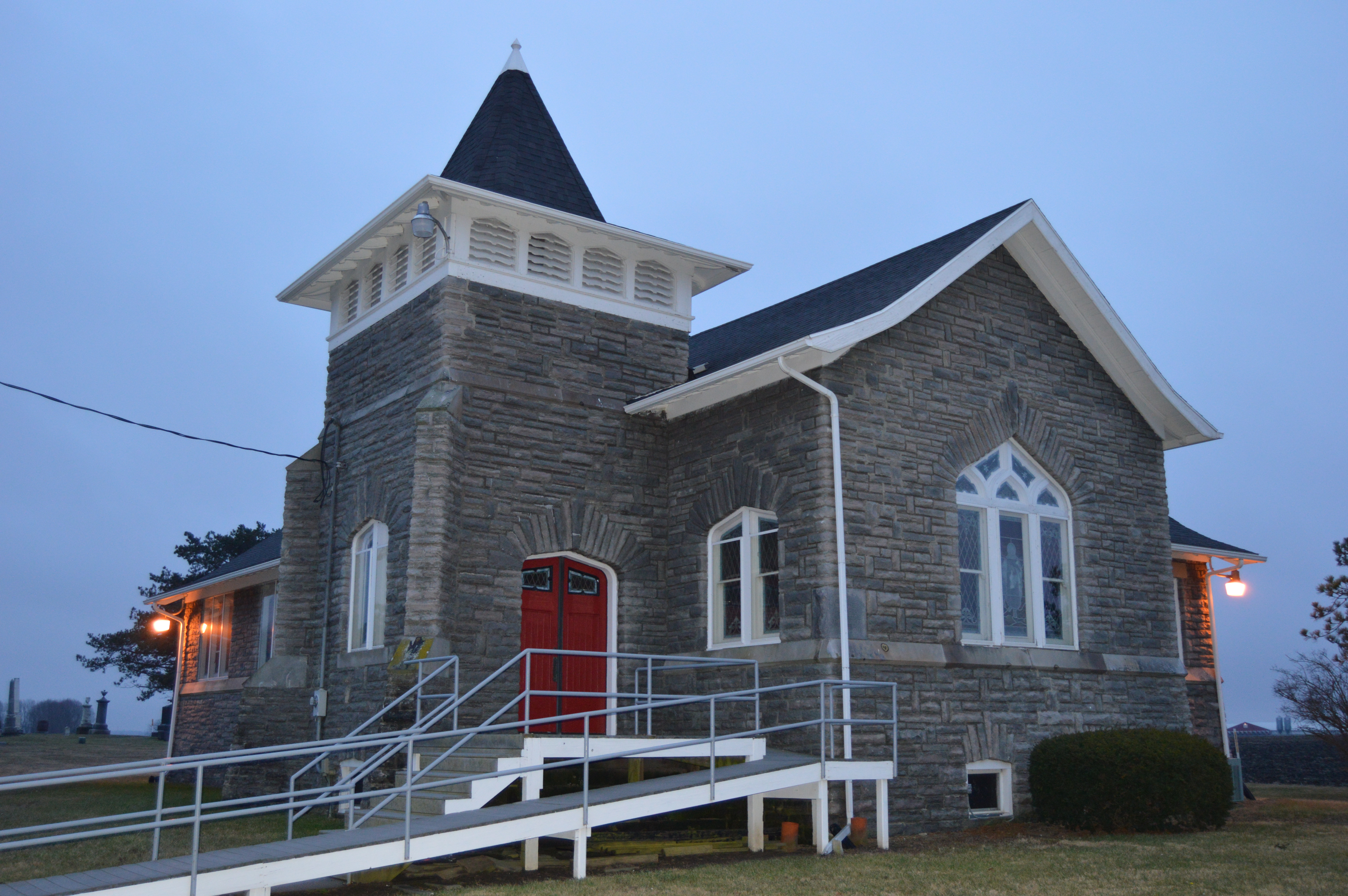
- Front and northern side of the church

- Location within Ohio Location within the United States
- Location: 999 OH 98, Bucyrus, Ohio
- Coordinates: 40°44′21″N 82°59′35″W
- Area: 2.3 acres (0.93 ha)
- Built: 1901
- Built by: R. C. Taylor
- Architect: Frank Packard
- Architectural style: English Country Motif
- NRHP reference No.: 86003494
- Added to NRHP: December 29, 1986

Monnett Memorial M. E. Chapel (Monnett Chapel) is a historic church at 999 OH 98 in Bucyrus, Ohio.

It was built in 1901 and added to the National Register of Historic Places in 1986.

== History ==
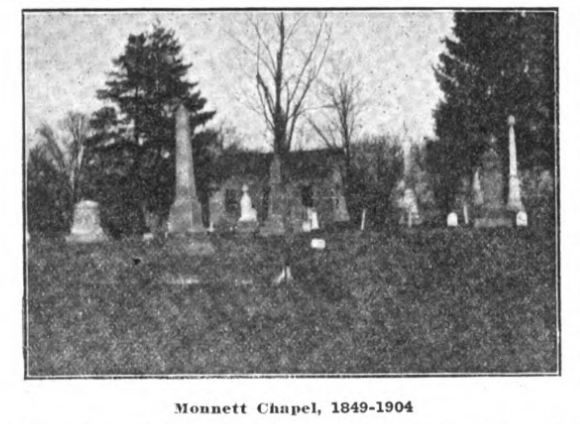
Old Monnett chapel

The congregation traces its history back to 1828, when Issac Monnett held services in his own home. The original chapel was built in 1849 by Jeremiah Monnett, a relative of Mary Monnett Bain. It had between 12 and 17 members during the 1890s. That number dropped to 6 in the year prior to the completion of the new chapel.

Construction on the new building was begun in 1902. Its main floor seating capacity was 300, and featured an organ-loft. It was built of blue limestone and the pulpit was oak. The new, heated chapel was dedicated August 28, 1904 and featured a "Sunday School Room". The cost for structure was $8,500, much of the cost was funded by a gift from the late Placidia Shaw, a granddaughter of Jeremiah Monnett. By 1908, its membership had grown to 53.
