= Parkersburg Women's Club =

- U.S. National Register of Historic Places
- U.S. Historic district – Contributing property
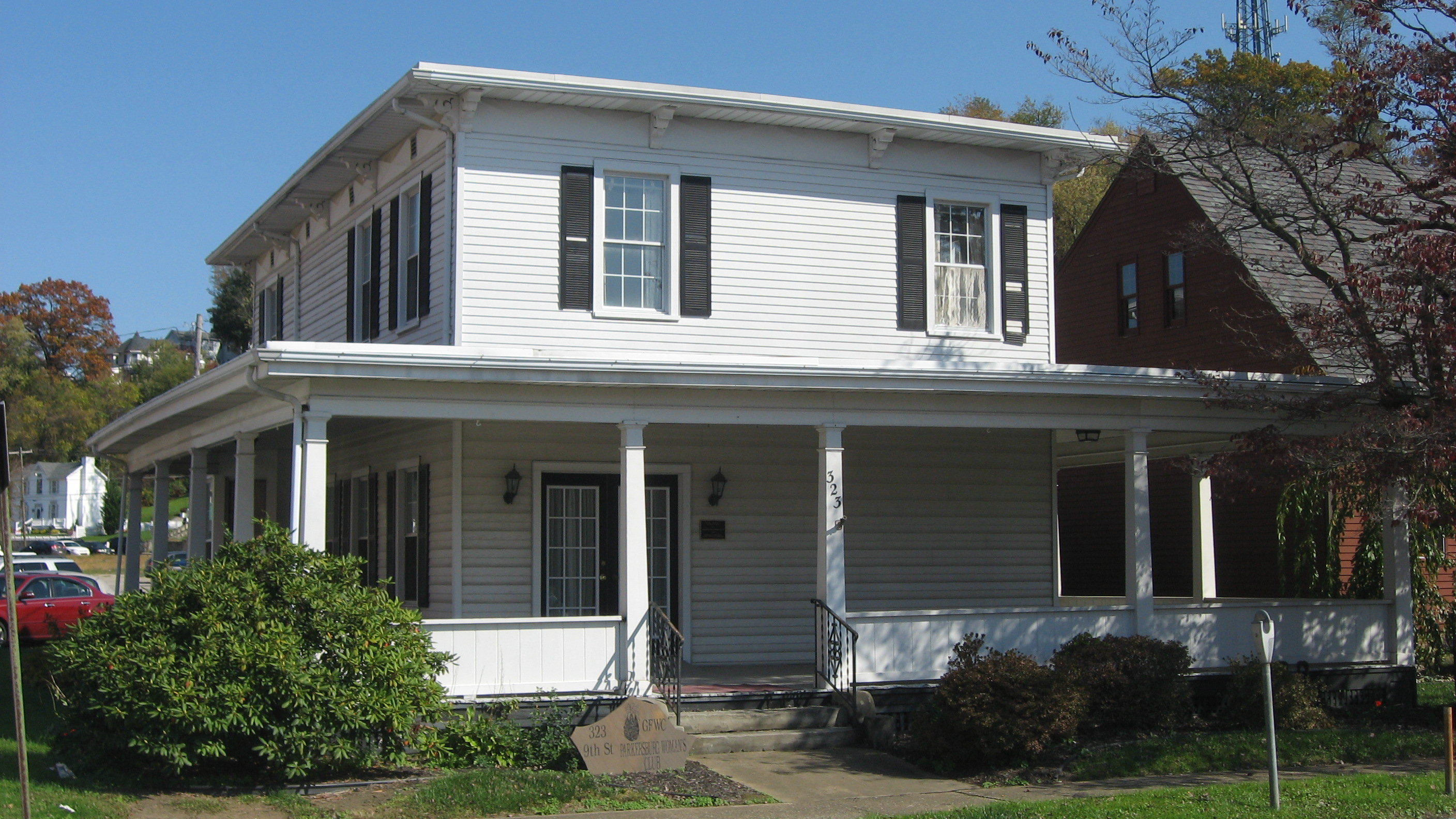
- Front and northern side

- Location within West Virginia Location within the United States
- Location: 323 9th St., Parkersburg, West Virginia
- Coordinates: 39°16′2″N 81°33′20″W
- Area: Less than 1 acre (0.40 ha)
- Built: 1860
- Architectural style: Italian Villa
- Part of: Avery Street Historic District (ID86000849)
- MPS: Downtown Parkersburg MRA
- NRHP reference No.: 82001782
- Added to NRHP: October 8, 1982

Parkersburg Women's Club is a historic clubhouse located at Parkersburg, Wood County, West Virginia. It was built between about 1860 and 1879, as a private home in the Italian Villa style. It is a two-story, frame building with a very low-pitched hipped roof. It features a one-story wraparound porch. It has housed the Parkersburg Women's Club since 1921.

It was listed on the National Register of Historic Places in 1982, and it is a contributing property to the Avery Street Historic District, which was designated and listed on the National Register in 1986.

== See also ==
- National Register of Historic Places listings in Wood County, West Virginia
