= Bryn Du Mansion =

Historic house in Ohio, United States

- McCune's Villa
- U.S. National Register of Historic Places
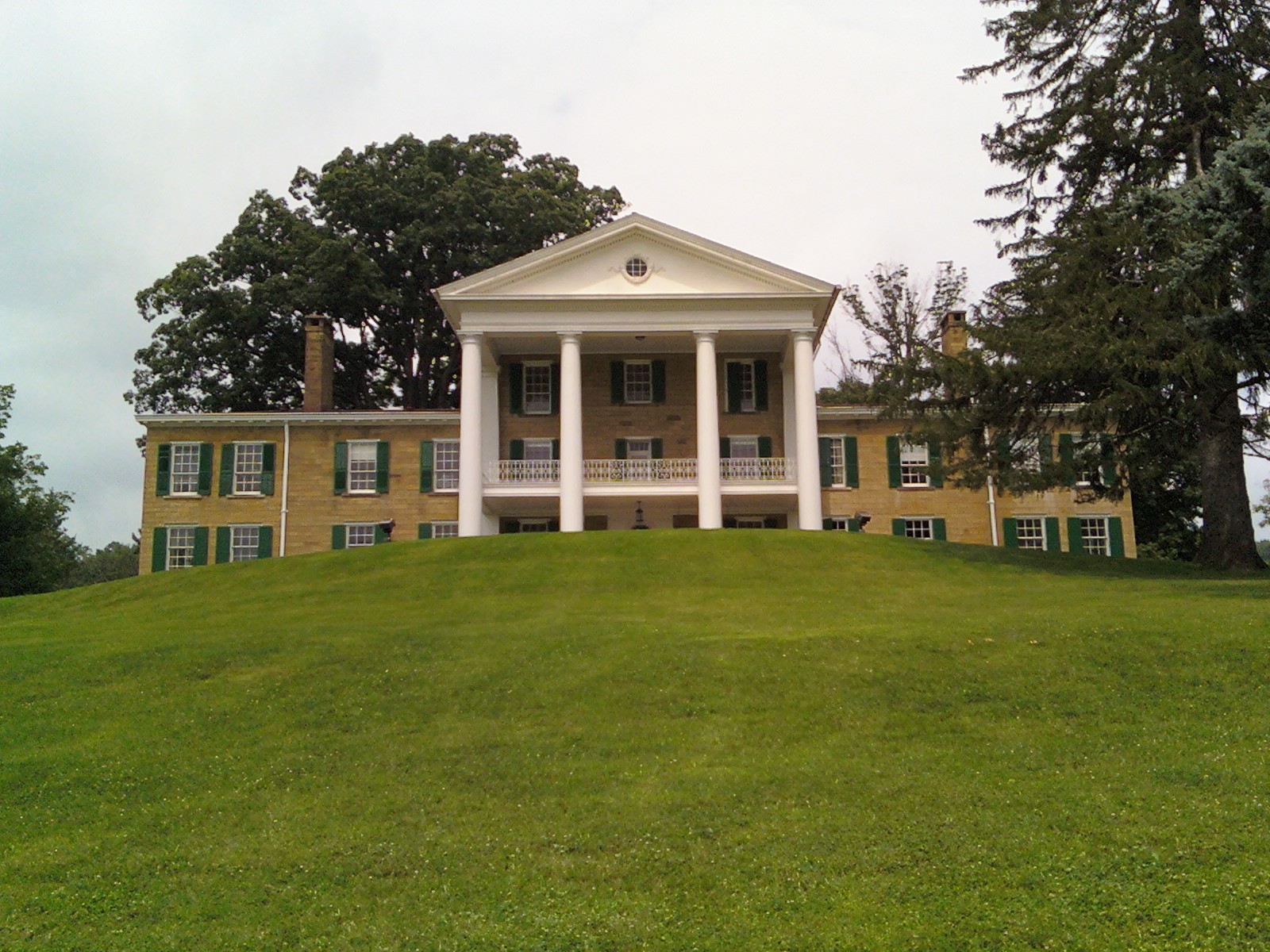
- Front of the house

- Location within Ohio Location within the United States
- Location: 537 Jones Rd., Granville Township, Licking County, Ohio
- Nearest city: Granville
- Coordinates: 40°5′7″N 82°29′33″W
- Area: 50 acres (20 ha)
- Built: Circa 1905
- Architect: Frank Packard; Henry D. Wright
- Architectural style: Georgian, Federal
- NRHP reference No.: 82003602

Bryn Du Mansion is a historic house in Granville, a village in Licking County, Ohio, United States. The estate is owned by the village and is on the National Register of Historic Places. The mansion consists of 52 rooms and has 12 fireplaces. It occupies a site about one-quarter mile north of Newark-Granville Road, and one mile directly east of the village of Granville.

== History ==
Local businessman Henry D. Wright originally constructed the mansion on this site as an Italianate Villa type structure in 1865. The outside of the building was made from sandstone quarried from the property. The villa had a central three-story tower flanked by two wings. The third story of the tower had three arched openings on each side and an arched central entrance facing the south. Jonas McCune became the owner within a year after construction and the property became known as McCune's Villa.

Several others owned the property prior to John Sutphin Jones, a coal and railroad magnate, who purchased the property in 1905. Jones soon hired Frank Packard, a well known Columbus architect, to orchestrate the renovation of the mansion. The project took nearly five years and transformed the mansion into its Georgian-Federal style design. Among other renovations, Packard added the wings, increasing the width of the house from 100 to 140 feet, as well as the great Federal style portico on the south wall of the tower. The additions to the mansion were made from the same quarry stone as the original. Packard also constructed the outbuildings: the carriage house, the laundry house, and the horse barn.

The interior of the mansion has a combination of Federal and Georgian motifs. The decorative plaster ceilings are in the Adams (Federal-McIntire) manner.

== Etymology ==
Jones named the estate “Bryn Du”, which means Black Hill in Welsh, honoring his ancestral background and the area full of coal in which he made his fortune, namely southern Ohio.

== Jones' occupancy ==
Jones' "town house" being Monomoy Place, currently the home of the presidents of Denison University, Jones bought and renovated the McCune's Villa to serve as the country house for his first wife Sarah Fidelia Follett ("Sally") Jones. Unfortunately, Sally died in 1910, just as the renovations were being completed. Jones then remarried 1 August 1911, and lived in the mansion with his second wife, Alice Baxter Bartlett Jones, and their two daughters, Sallie and Alice. During the Jones’ occupancy, dinner was served to Calvin Coolidge, William Howard Taft and Warren G. Harding at the Mansion. Lillian Gish and Katharine Cornell sipped coffee and Paderewski and Rachmaninoff played the Steinway.

Jones died in 1927 and his elder daughter, Sallie Jones Sexton, inherited the property, living on the estate while managing the farm and the Granville Inn. Sallie became a local legend, famous for breeding and training show horses, and for her vivid personality and colorful language. Sallie's storied management style led the estate into bankruptcy.

William M. and Ortha A. Wright (no relation to the original Wright owners) purchased the property in 1979 and renovated the mansion into a restaurant for a brief time. Quest International purchased the property in 1989 for their company headquarters.

== Longaberger era ==
Dave Longaberger purchased the estate in 1995. Longaberger constructed the game courts and field house facilities and began a major renovation project of the existing buildings, which halted at the time of his death in 1999.

== Today ==
An advisory election was held in November 2002 in the Village of Granville to determine public opinion regarding the purchase of the property. Sixty two percent of the voters in the Village of Granville supported the property purchase. The Village purchased the property on December 16, 2002, from the Longaberger Company. The Village conveyed ownership of half of the front field (16.12 acres) to the Granville Township for green space preservation.
