= Columbus Foundation =

Organization in Columbus, Ohio

- Old Governor's Mansion
- U.S. National Register of Historic Places
- U.S. Historic district – Contributing property
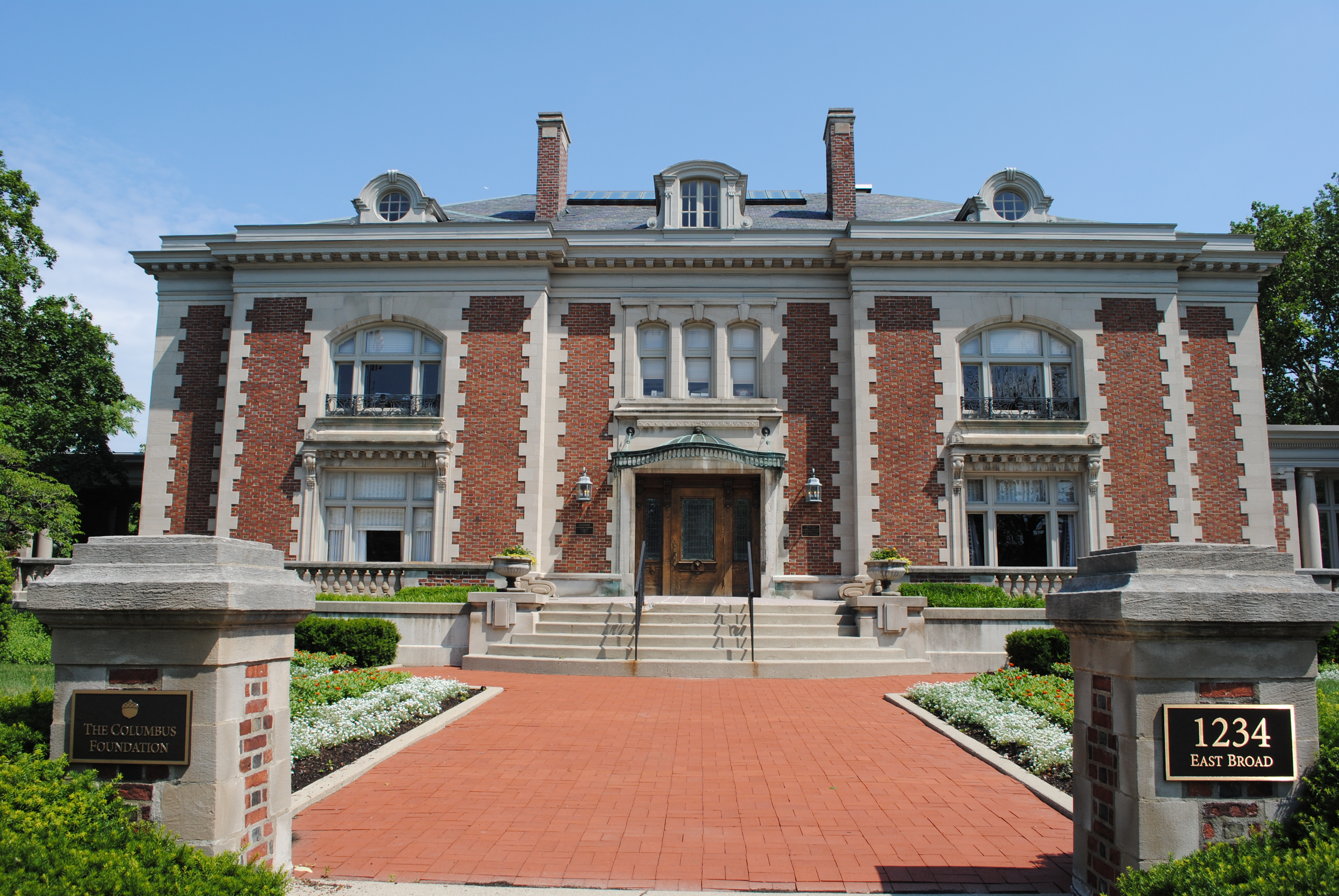
- Interactive map highlighting the building's location
- Location: 1234 E. Broad St., Columbus, Ohio
- Coordinates: 39°57′59″N 82°58′6″W
- Area: 6 acres (2.4 ha)
- Built: 1904
- Architect: Frank Packard
- Architectural style: Colonial Revival, Neo-Georgian eclectic
- Part of: East Broad Street Historic District
- MPS: East Broad Street MRA
- NRHP reference No.: 72001012
- Added to NRHP: June 5, 1972

The Columbus Foundation is a nonprofit charitable organization in Columbus, Ohio, founded in 1943. The Foundation focuses on improving the quality of life in central Ohio by supporting community development, arts and culture, education, health and human services, and other community needs. Its stated mission is to "assist donors and others in strengthening and improving our community for the benefit of all its residents." The Foundation also sponsors a number of "competitive grant programs".

== History ==
The foundation was created by Harrison M. Sayre. Sayre's father was involved in philanthropy in Newark, Ohio. As Sayre became more involved in the community, he felt he could benefit it with the community foundation. Sayre and Russell Cole met with Huntington Bank and City National Bank executives to establish the foundation on December 29, 1943. In 1947, the Ohio National Bank joined the foundation. At Sayre's death, the organization received about 150 donations in his honor.

The oldest charitable fund managed by the Foundation was established by William G. Deshler in the 1880s, in memory of his deceased daughter and mother. The funds assist the Columbus Female Benevolent Society in aiding women and children in need in the Columbus area.

== Location ==
The Columbus Foundation is housed in the Old Governor's Mansion at 1234 E. Broad St., built in 1904. Also known as the Ohio Archives Building or as the Charles H. Lindenberg Home, the building was listed on the National Register of Historic Places in 1972, and is also part of the register's East Broad Street Historic District. It was designed in Colonial Revival and/or Neo-Georgian eclectic style by architect Frank Packard. The listing is for six acres including three contributing buildings. It was built for Charles H. Lindenberg, president of the Lilley Regalia Company. It was later home of ten governors of Ohio and their families, during a 36-year period.

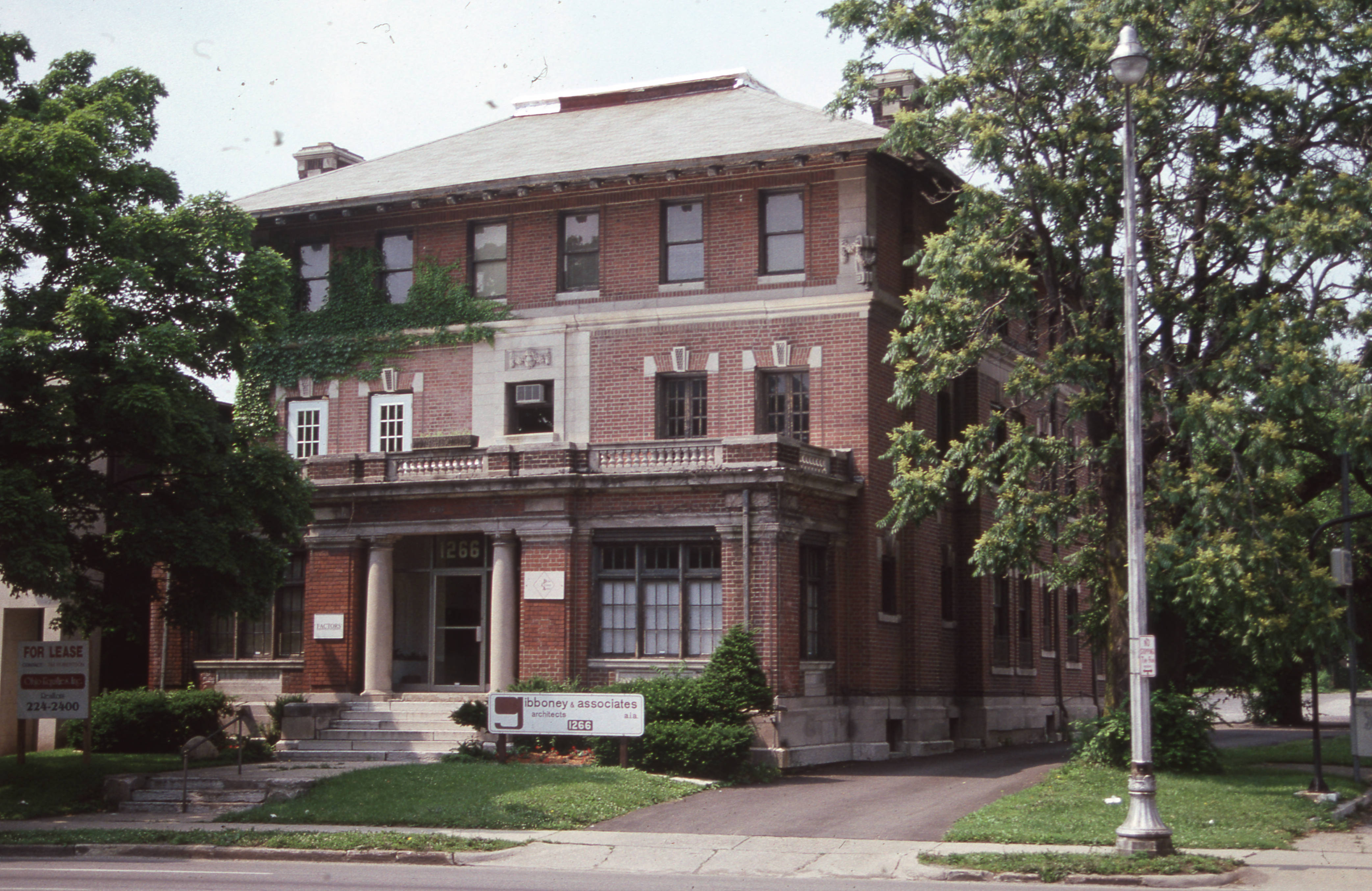
The Joseph F. Firestone House in 1990

In 2008, the foundation demolished the Joseph F. Firestone House, neighboring the organization's headquarters and built c. 1900. The house had been vacant for years, and the foundation considered saving it, but the structure was deemed too impractical and expensive to be converted for further use. The building was a part of the East Broad Street Historic District on the National Register of Historic Places. It was replaced with a surface parking lot and green space.

== See also ==
- National Register of Historic Places listings in Columbus, Ohio
