= Joseph F. Firestone House =

- U.S. Historic district – Contributing property
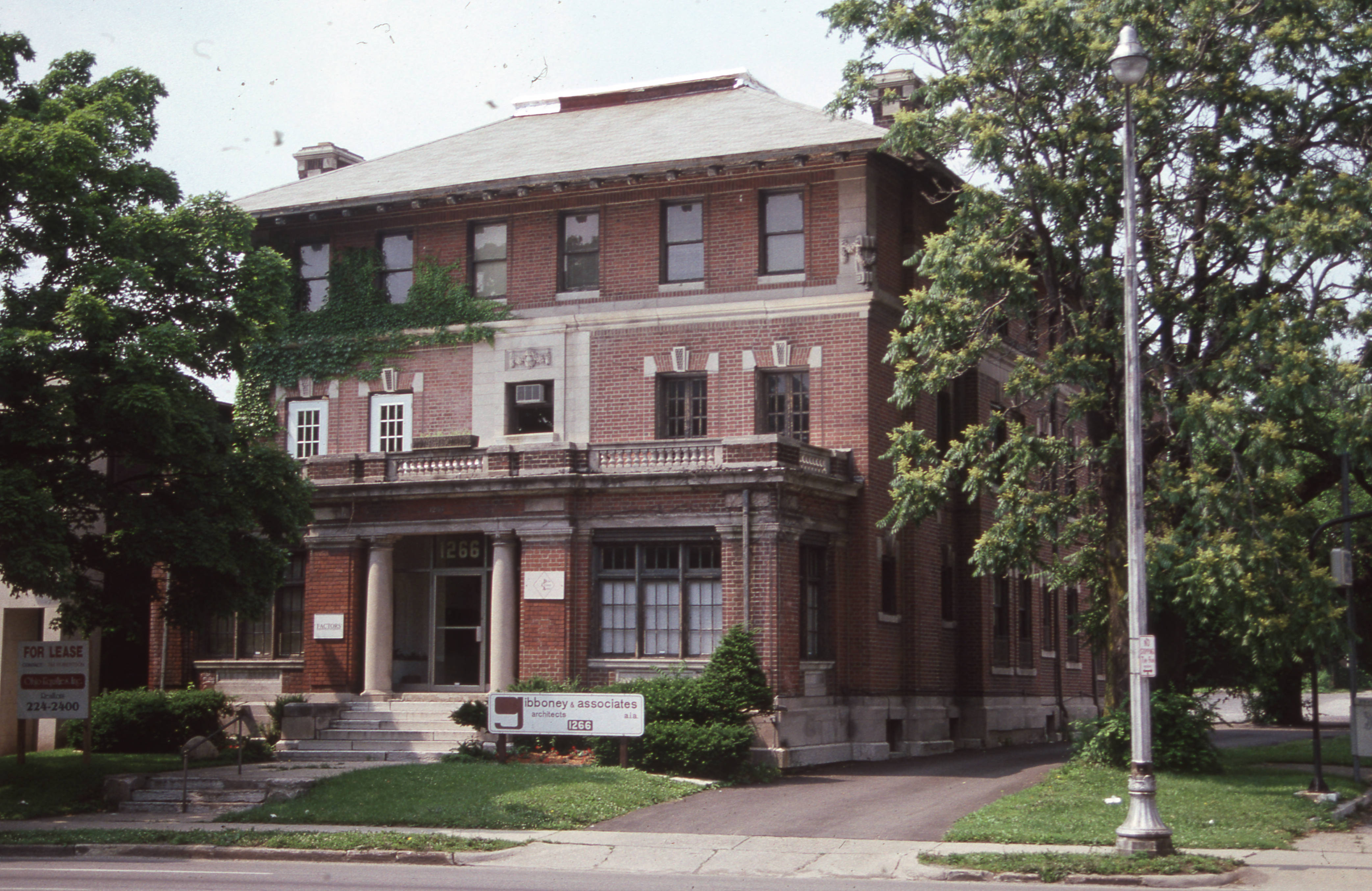
- The house in 1990
- Interactive map highlighting the building's location
- Location: 1266 E. Broad Street, Columbus, Ohio
- Coordinates: 39.9664°N 82.9665°W
- Built: 1905–1906
- Architect: Frank Packard
- Architectural style: Second Renaissance Revival
- Demolished: 2008
- Part of: East Broad Street Historic District
- Added to NRHP: March 17, 1987

The Joseph F. Firestone House was a historic house at 1266 E. Broad Street in Columbus, Ohio. The building contributed to the East Broad Street Historic District, on the National Register of Historic Places. It was demolished by the Columbus Foundation in 2008.

The house was built from 1905 to 1906 to designs by Frank Packard, one of Columbus's most prolific architects.

== Attributes ==
The Joseph F. Firestone House was designed by Frank Packard, one of the most noted and prolific architects in Columbus. The house had three stories and was massive, larger than most along East Broad Street, and with 9,859 square feet (915.9 m^{2}). It had elements of the Second Renaissance Revival style, with elaborate stone trim, classical design elements, and a low-pitched hip roof with wide overhanging eaves. The exterior was made of brick, in a Flemish bond arrangement. Window and door openings had ornamental stone and brick surrounds, a stone beltcourse, garlands, and festoons. The chimneys were elaborately decorated as well. The house had a single-story enclosed porch with brick pilasters and massive Ionic stone columns, all below a balustrade.

On the same block was a c. 1920s service station, in an "Old English" Tudor Revival style, also contributing to the East Broad Street Historic District and demolished by the Columbus Foundation.

== History ==
The house was built from 1905 to 1906 for Joseph Frederick Firestone, vice president of the Columbus Buggy Company. In 1918 it was owned by Constant Melancon, manager of the Boston Store, and in 1924, by Lee E. Sulzer, treasurer of the Sulzer Battery & Equipment Co. The house was subdivided into apartments in the 1930s, as was typical of homes on East Broad Street by that time.

In the 1990s, the house was owned by architect John P. Gibboney. He sold the house below its appraised value to the Columbus Foundation, as a "gift/sale", in 1999. Gibboney described the house as "wonderful when [he] left it"; he quit using it for offices around 2003, and the foundation did not maintain it afterward.

In 2008, the Columbus Foundation demolished the house, neighboring the organization's headquarters. The house had been vacant for years, and the foundation considered saving it, but the structure was deemed too impractical and expensive to be converted for further use. It was replaced with grass and trees for overflow parking. The demolition was opposed by the Columbus Landmarks Foundation and Near East Commission, and protested by members of the Old Towne East Neighborhood Association, who picketed in front of the mansion.

== See also ==
- Clinton DeWeese Firestone mansion
- List of demolished buildings and structures in Columbus, Ohio
- National Register of Historic Places listings in Columbus, Ohio
