= Thomas C. Miller Public School =

- U.S. National Register of Historic Places
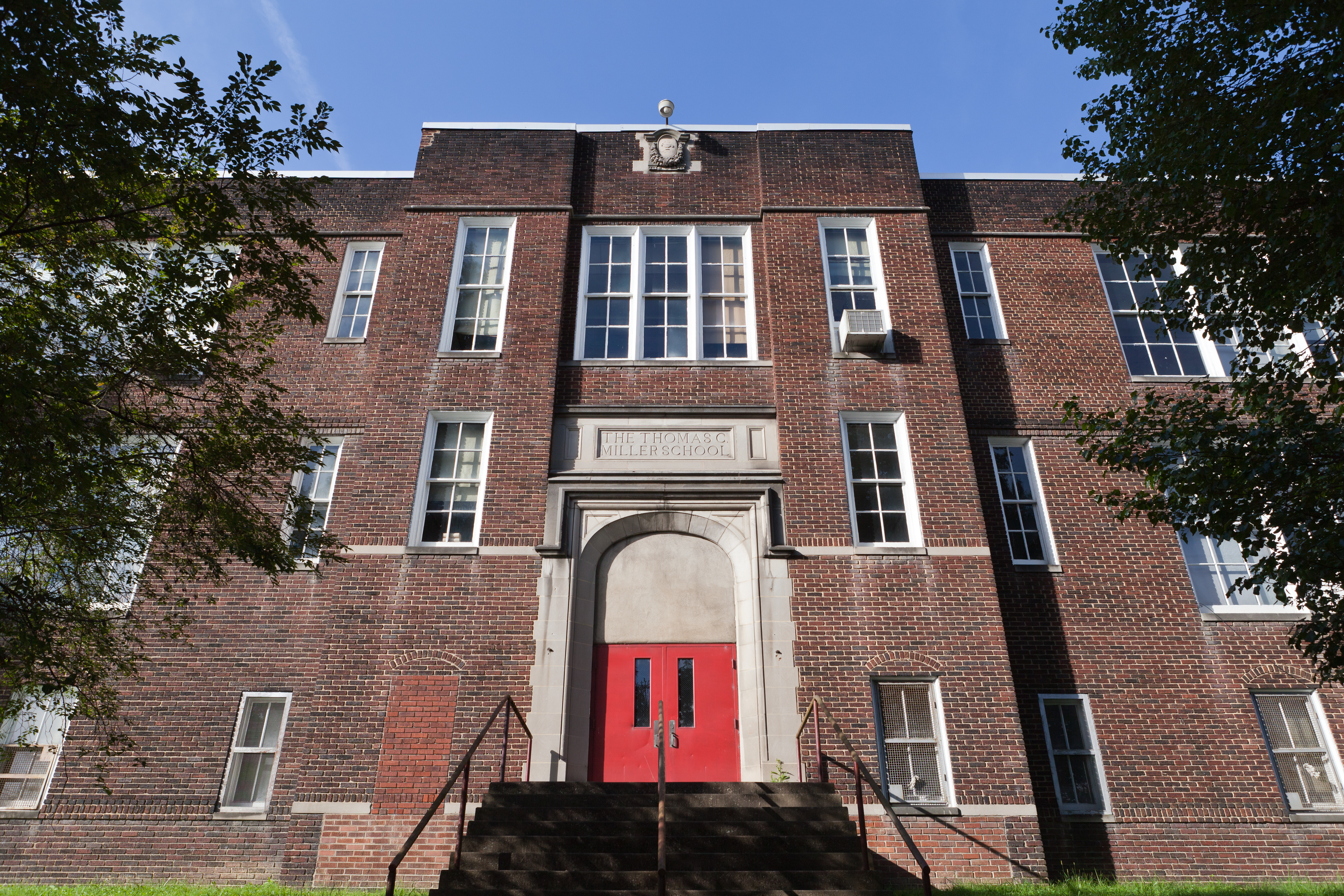
- Thomas C. Miller Public School, northeast side

- Location within West Virginia Location within the United States
- Location: 2 Pennsylvania Avenue, Fairmont, West Virginia
- Coordinates: 39°29′19.99″N 80°8′29.94″W
- Area: 2.2 acres (0.89 ha)
- Built: 1914
- Architect: William B. Ittner; Frank L. Packard
- Architectural style: Colonial Revival
- NRHP reference No.: 13000263
- Added to NRHP: May 8, 2013

Thomas C. Miller Public School is a historic school building located in Fairmont, Marion County, West Virginia. It was built in 1914 with an annex added in 1928. The original building is Colonial Revival in style with Jacobethan style detailing in the entrance surrounds. The architect was Frank L. Packard.

The 1928 annex is a three-story brick building with concrete foundation, laid in the Flemish garden wall (Sussex) bond. William B. Ittner was the architect.

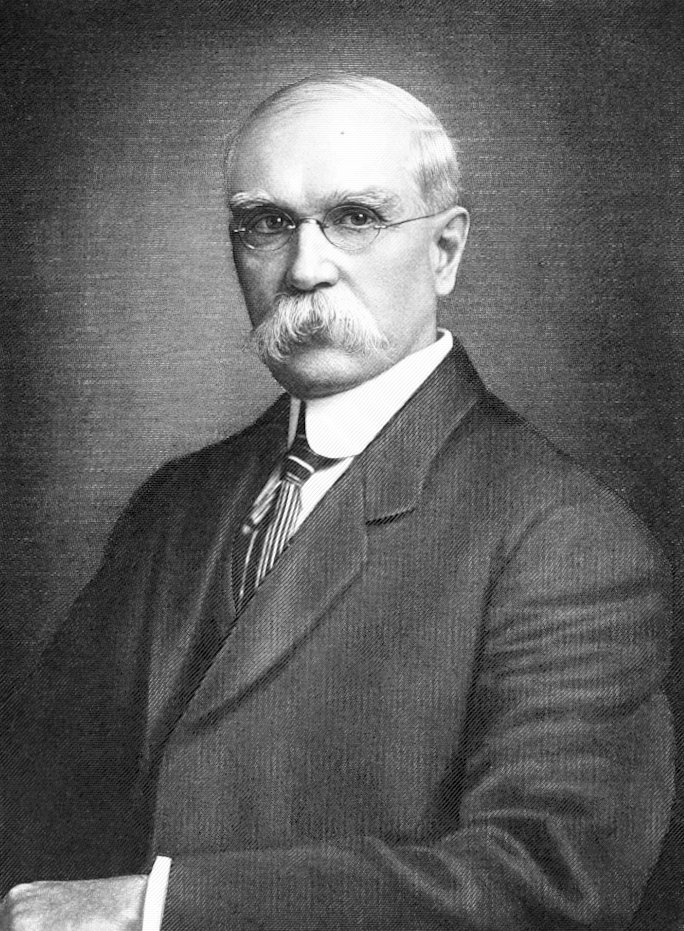
Thomas Condit Miller (1848–1928)

The school was named for Thomas Condit Miller, an educator in Fairmont, professor of education at West Virginia University, State Superintendent of Schools for West Virginia, and ninth principal of Shepherd College.

It was listed on the National Register of Historic Places in 2013.
