= Old Clay County Courthouse (West Virginia) =

- U.S. National Register of Historic Places
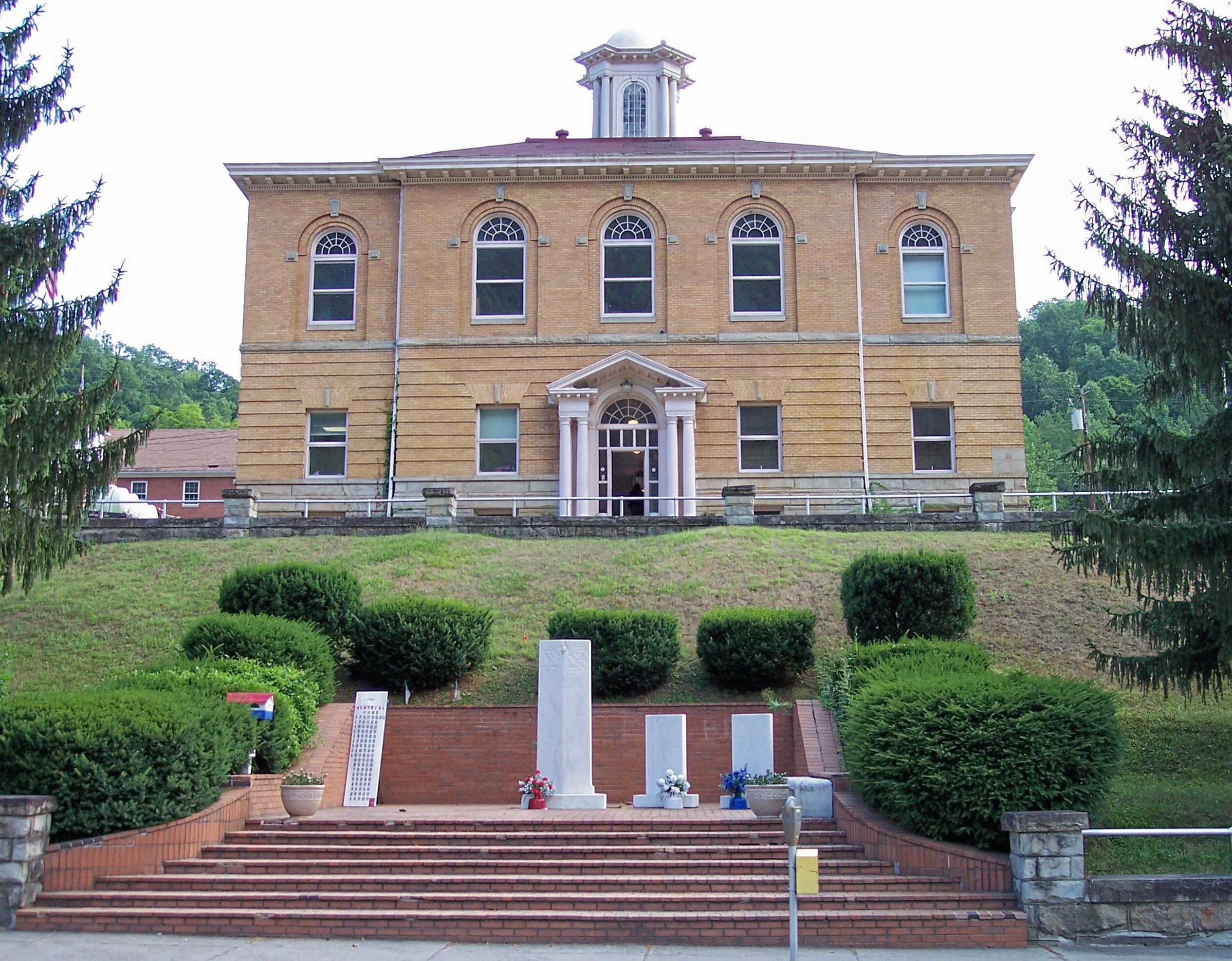

- Location within West Virginia Location within the United States
- Interactive map showing the location of Old Clay County Courthouse
- Location: Clay, West Virginia
- Coordinates: 38°27′36″N 81°5′0″W
- Built: 1902
- Architect: Packard, Frank L.
- Architectural style: Beaux Arts
- NRHP reference No.: 79002573
- Added to NRHP: April 20, 1979

The Old Clay County Courthouse in Clay, West Virginia was designed by Frank Packard and built in 1902. The Beaux-Arts building was located on a hill overlooking the county seat. The courthouse was the site of three notable trials: the Sarah Ann Legg trial of 1905, the first trial of a woman in Clay County for murder, the Booger Hole trial of 1917, in which citizens nearly lynched the defendants, and the Oscar Bail trial of 1953, in which Bail was convicted of killing a mine guard in the Great Widen Coal Strike.

Since a new courthouse opened across the street, the old courthouse houses magistrate's offices and the county extension agent.
