= Empire Building (Columbus, Ohio) =

- Yuster Building
- U.S. National Register of Historic Places
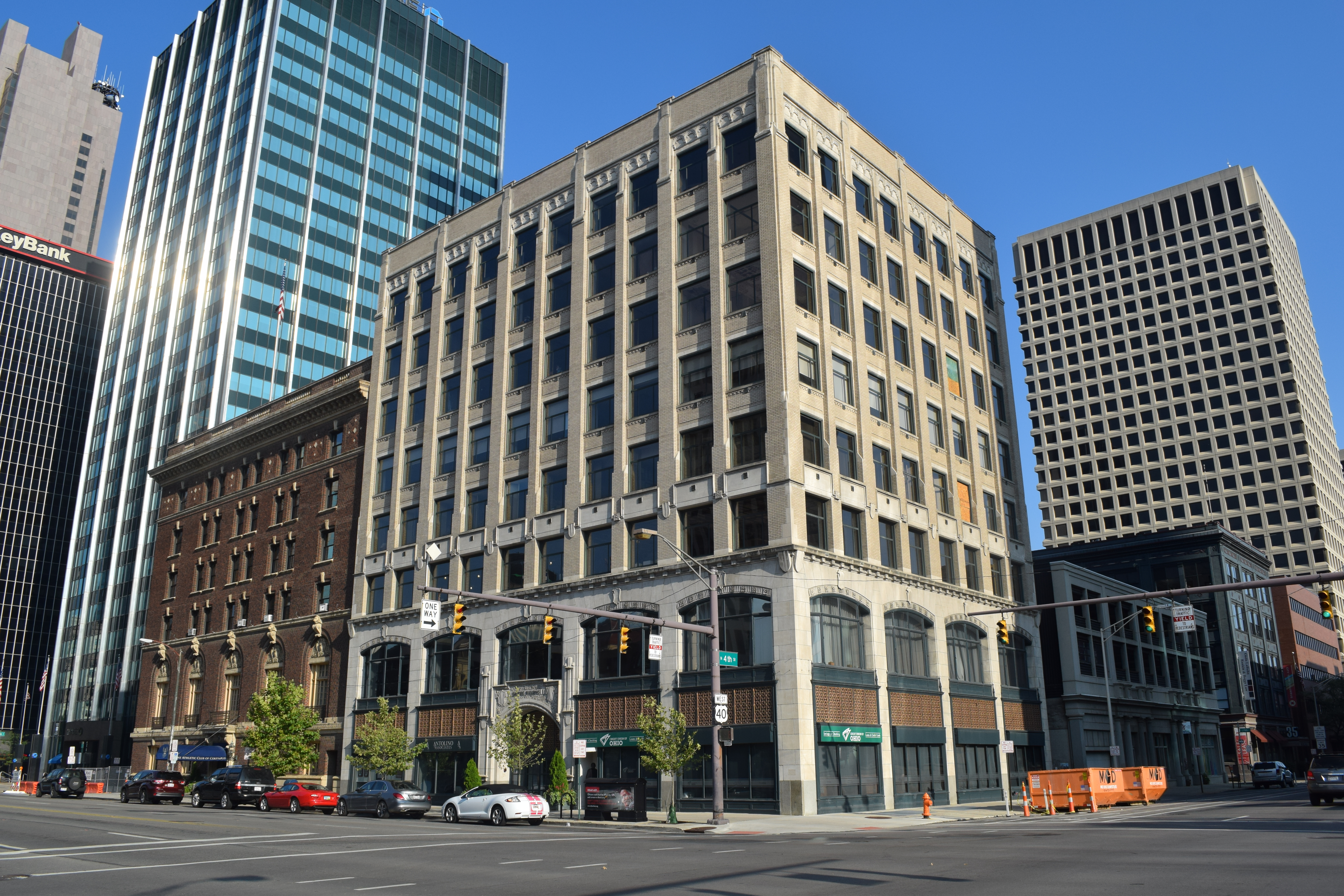
- Interactive map highlighting the building's location
- Location: 150 E. Broad St., Columbus, Ohio
- Coordinates: 39.96296°N 82.99660°W
- Built: 1924
- Architect: Frank Packard
- NRHP reference No.: 100001268
- Added to NRHP: July 3, 2017

The Empire Building, also known as the Yuster Building, is a historic building in Downtown Columbus, Ohio. It was listed on the National Register of Historic Places in 2017. The eight-story Empire Building has Gothic-inspired commercial architecture. Its main tenant is also the building owner, Continental Real Estate. The Credit Union of Ohio operates on its ground floor.

The building was originally known as the Yuster Building for owner Maurice Yuster. It was designed by noted Columbus architect Frank Packard, who died about half a year before its completion in 1924.

== See also ==
- National Register of Historic Places listings in Columbus, Ohio
