= Bishop Hall (Miami University) =

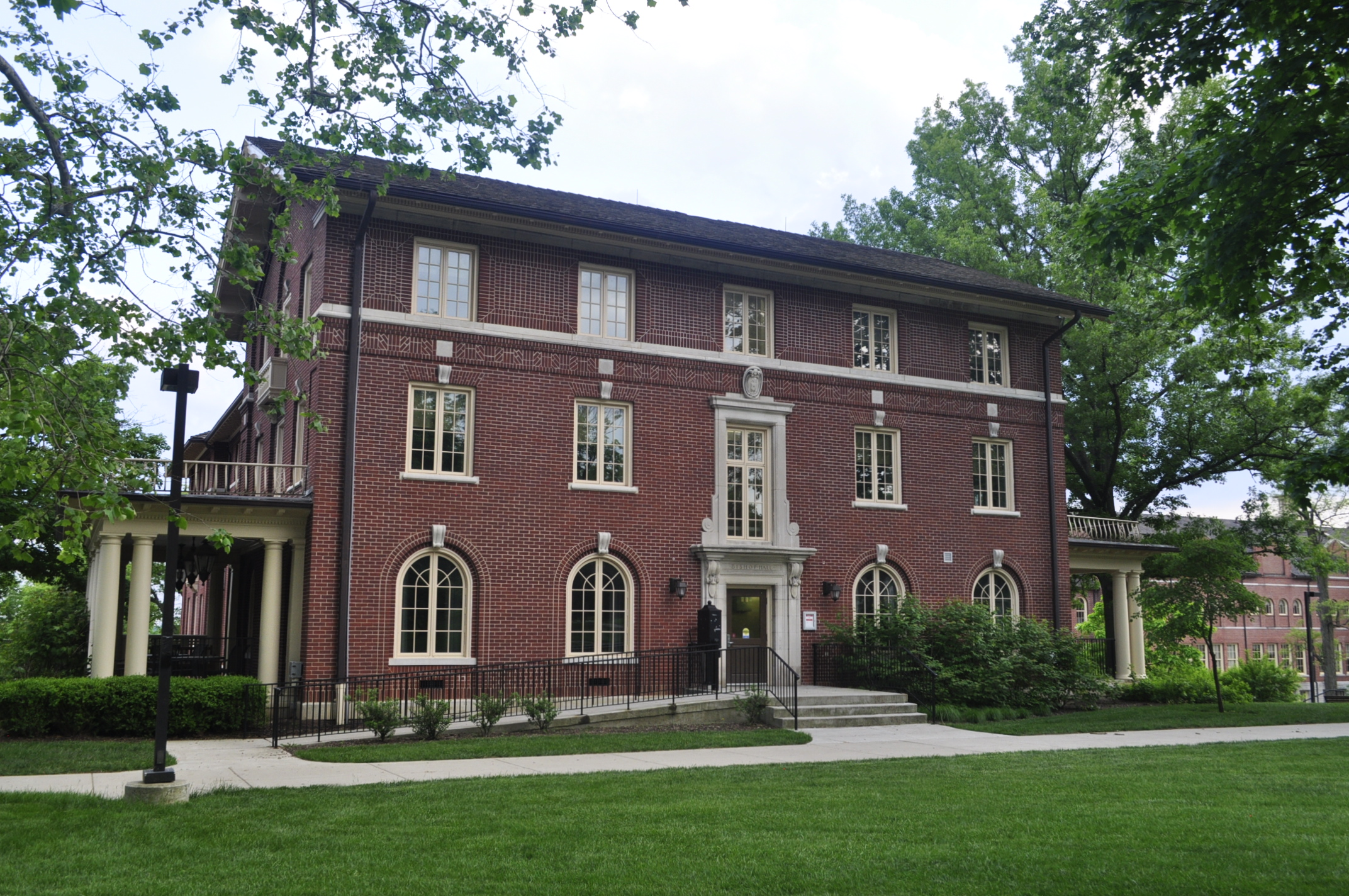
- Front entrance of Bishop Hall at Miami University
- Interactive map of the Bishop Hall area

General information
- Type: Dormitory
- Architectural style: Georgian Architecture
- Location: Oxford, Ohio
- Coordinates: 39°30′28.3″N 84°44′13.3″W
- Current tenants: Co-ed upperclass residents
- Construction started: 1911
- Completed: January 1912
- Cost: $75,000
- Client: Miami University

Technical details
- Floor area: 26, 289 square feet

Design and construction
- Architect: Frank Packard
- Main contractor: Vesta Construction

Bishop Hall is an academic, administrative, and residence building, housing co-ed upperclassmen residents of Miami University in Oxford, Ohio.

== Development ==
Before the erection of Bishop Hall, the original system of living for the women of Miami University consisted of two cottages. The women affiliated with sororities attempted to live off campus in order to provide more living space for unaffiliated women, but returned to the cottages after one year. There was a “pressing need for more accommodations for women” and many “inconveniences of the cottage system”.

In her annual reports, Elizabeth Hamilton, the dean of women, pressed the need for an additional women's dormitory. The enactment of the appropriation granted for the construction of Bishop Hall is attributed to Guy Potter Benton.

The appropriation amount granted by the Board of Trustees House of Representatives for the construction of Bishop Hall was $37,500. There was a small wait for the concurrence of the Senate, but also an expression of the need for a “rapid completion”, indicating the urgency of the construction and need of the new residence hall. The hall was to accommodate 104 women. There was encouragement for the new building to be used for the women of the present university and not for the addition of more women. The expected completion date was projected to be January 1912.

== Structure ==
The address of Bishop Hall, abbreviated BIS, is 300 East Spring Street, Oxford, Ohio 45056. The cost to construct Bishop Hall was $75,000. Bishop Hall is 26,289 square feet. The residence hall houses 102 occupants in 55 rooms. Bishop Hall is actually the second dormitory for women.

Today, Bishop Hall is used as an academic, administrative, and residence building, specifically housing co-ed upperclass residents. It was designed by Frank L. Packard, contracted with Vesta Construction, and was built in 1912. Although there was no cornerstone or dedication ceremony, the building was named after Robert Hamilton Bishop.

Robert Hamilton Bishop was the first president of Miami University (1824–1841). He also served as a professor of logic and moral philosophy and history. Bishop was admired by the students, but fell into much disagreement over many issues with the trustees, faculty, and public which led him to resign. Bishop remained on campus as a professor, but, as turmoil continued, was removed from campus entirely in 1844.

Bishop Hall was utilized as a dining hall too. Until a university infirmary was erected in 1923, the second floor of Bishop Hall was also used as a hospital and was entirely taken over during the influenza epidemic of 1918 for this purpose.

Shortly following the construction of Bishop Hall, the proposition of the need for a college infirmary was expressed by many prominent figures of the university, including the president. The current circumstances did not allow for proper care of students who were ill. There was also a need to handle potential epidemics that are common among small college towns. This created much irony as Bishop Hall was utilized as an infirmary, especially during the influenza epidemic of 1918.

There was a dismissal of the women of the college in order to accomplish the transition of Bishop Hall into a hospital that would allow treatment for patients. Over 100 cases were treated in the hospital of Bishop Hall. The first floor was reserved for the fifteen nurses and the second and third floors were occupied by patients. The primary care for all cases was accredited to Dr. MacMillan, after whom the first infirmary was named. The transformation of Bishop Hall from an infirmary back to a residence hall followed the erection of Wade MacMillan Hospital.
