= Putnam County Courthouse (Ohio) =

Local government building in the United States

- U.S. National Register of Historic Places
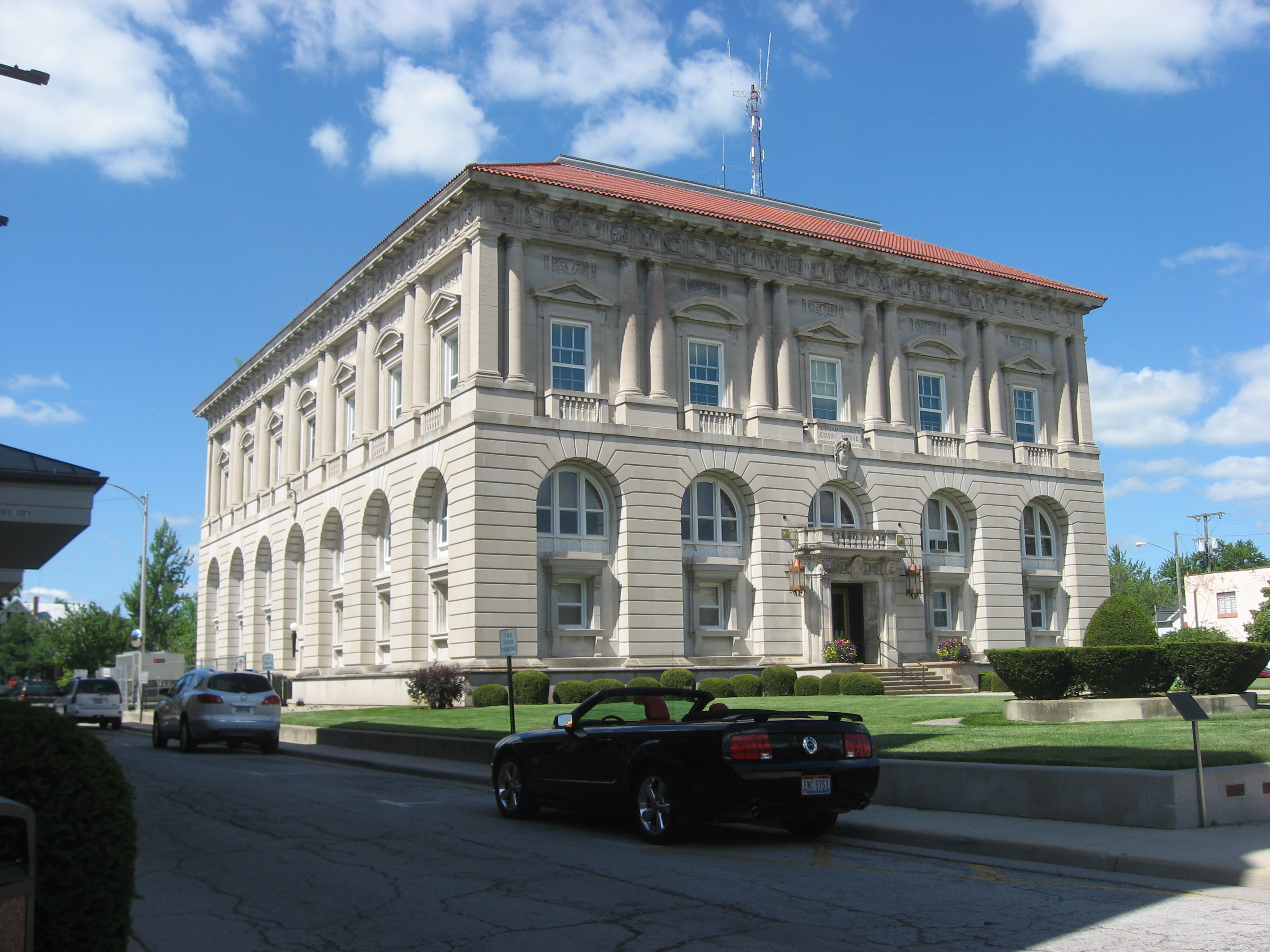
- Front and western side of the courthouse

- Location within Ohio Location within the United States
- Interactive map showing the location for Putnam County Courthouse
- Location: Courthouse Sq., Ottawa, Ohio
- Coordinates: 41°1′11″N 84°2′47″W
- Area: 1.5 acres (0.61 ha)
- Built: 1912
- Architect: Frank Packard; Ralph Snyder
- Architectural style: Beaux Arts
- NRHP reference No.: 74001608
- Added to NRHP: May 3, 1974

The Putnam County Courthouse is a historic governmental building in downtown Ottawa, Ohio, United States. A two-story building, located at 245 E. Main Street, it was built in 1912 in the Beaux-Arts style of architecture.

== Previous courthouses ==
The present courthouse is the fourth such structure to serve Putnam County. When the county was organized in 1834, the village of Kalida was designated the county seat, and a wooden courthouse was built there. It only served the county for four years, being replaced by a larger brick courthouse and jail complex in 1838. This building remained in use for more than a quarter century, but it was ruined by a devastating fire on December 18, 1864. With no courthouse, discussion arose about moving the county seat to Ottawa, which was growing more steadily than Kalida and was served by a railroad line, and which was located closer to the center of the county. An election in 1866 resulted in the seat being moved to Ottawa, and the village paid $15,000 for the erection of a new courthouse.

== Construction ==
Approximately forty years after the construction of the third courthouse, a movement grew for its replacement by a newer structure. After voters supported the construction of a new courthouse in a 1909 election, the county commissioners selected a Columbus architect, Frank Packard, to design the new building. Packard's design was a large Beaux-Arts structure, built on a stone foundation with stone walls and a tile roof of ceramic; he made extensive use of marble, stained glass, and oak wood. The entire structure cost slightly less than $200,000 to complete.

== Current usage ==
Today, the courthouse remains actively used by Putnam County's governmental officials. Cases in the Common Pleas Court are heard in Putnam County's main courtroom, located on the building's third floor. Other offices located in the courthouse include those of the county commissioners, the county auditor, the Clerk of Courts, the county engineer, and the county prosecutor. An annex is located at 336 E. Main Street, one block east of the courthouse.

== Recognition ==
In the early years of the twentieth century, as plans were being laid for the courthouse's construction, the building committee aimed to erect a structure that would be renowned in the year 2000. Their goal has succeeded: in the years since that time, careful maintenance has prevented deterioration, and no major changes have been made. Today, the courthouse is renowned as an architectural masterpiece; architectural historians have ranked it as the best Beaux-Arts courthouse anywhere in Ohio. The courthouse was listed on the National Register of Historic Places in 1974 because of its well preserved historic architecture, which was seen as significant statewide.
