= Bramwell Historic District =

Historic district in West Virginia, United States

- U.S. National Register of Historic Places
- U.S. Historic district
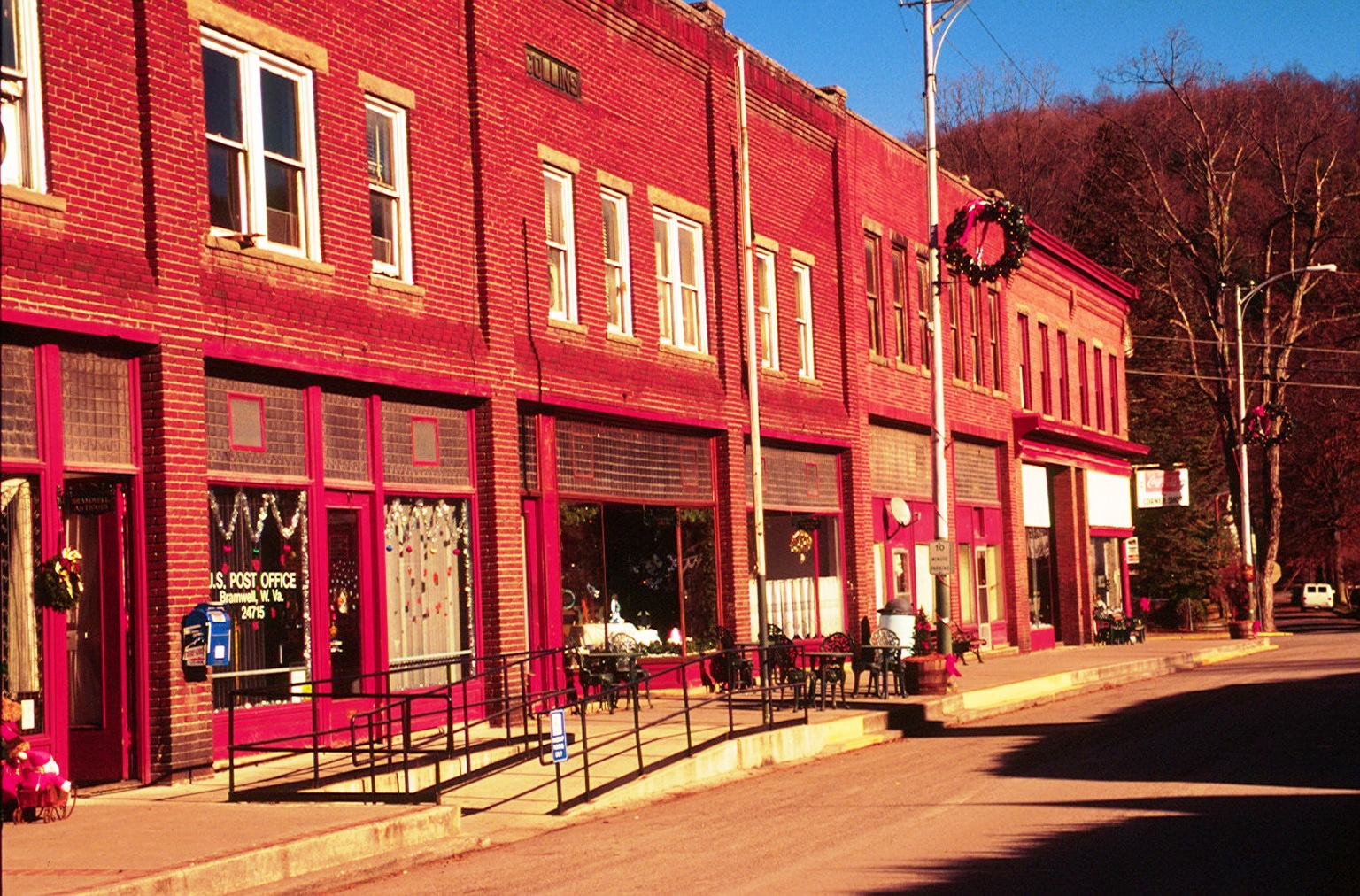
- Bramwell, West Virginia, March 2006

- Location within West Virginia Location within the United States
- Location: Main, Rose, Block, Dahring, Wyatt, Church, N. and S. River Sts., Bramwell, West Virginia
- Coordinates: 37°19′26″N 81°18′35″W
- Area: 55 acres (22 ha)
- Architectural style: Mixed (more Than 2 Styles From Different Periods)
- NRHP reference No.: 83003244
- Added to NRHP: February 10, 1983

Bramwell Historic District is a national historic district located at Bramwell, Mercer County, West Virginia. The district includes 65 contributing buildings and 2 contributing structures in the central business district and surrounding residential areas of Bramwell. Most of the buildings pre-date the 1920s. Notable buildings include the Bramwell Town Hall (c. 1889), Bryant Building (c. 1910) (Bryant Pharmacy and soda fountain, the pharmacy later became the Corner Shop Diner with the original soda fountain), Masonic Hall (c. 1893-1894), Cooper House (1910), Cooper Indoor Pool (1910), Cooper Garage Apartment (1910), Bank of Bramwell (c. 1893), Perry House (c. 1901-1904), Hewitt House (1914-1915), Hewitt Garage Apartment (1914-1915), Mann House, Bramwell Presbyterian Church (1902), Goodwill House (c. 1894, 1905), Thomas House (c. 1909-1912), Thomas Garage / Apartment (c. 1909-1912), Buck/Bowen House (c. 1900), Mann Playhouse (c. 1910), Freeman House (c. 1893), and Former Holy Trinity Episcopal Church (c. 1895).

It was listed on the National Register of Historic Places in 1983.
