= East Broad Street Historic District (Columbus, Ohio) =

Historic district in Ohio, United States

- U.S. National Register of Historic Places
- U.S. Historic district
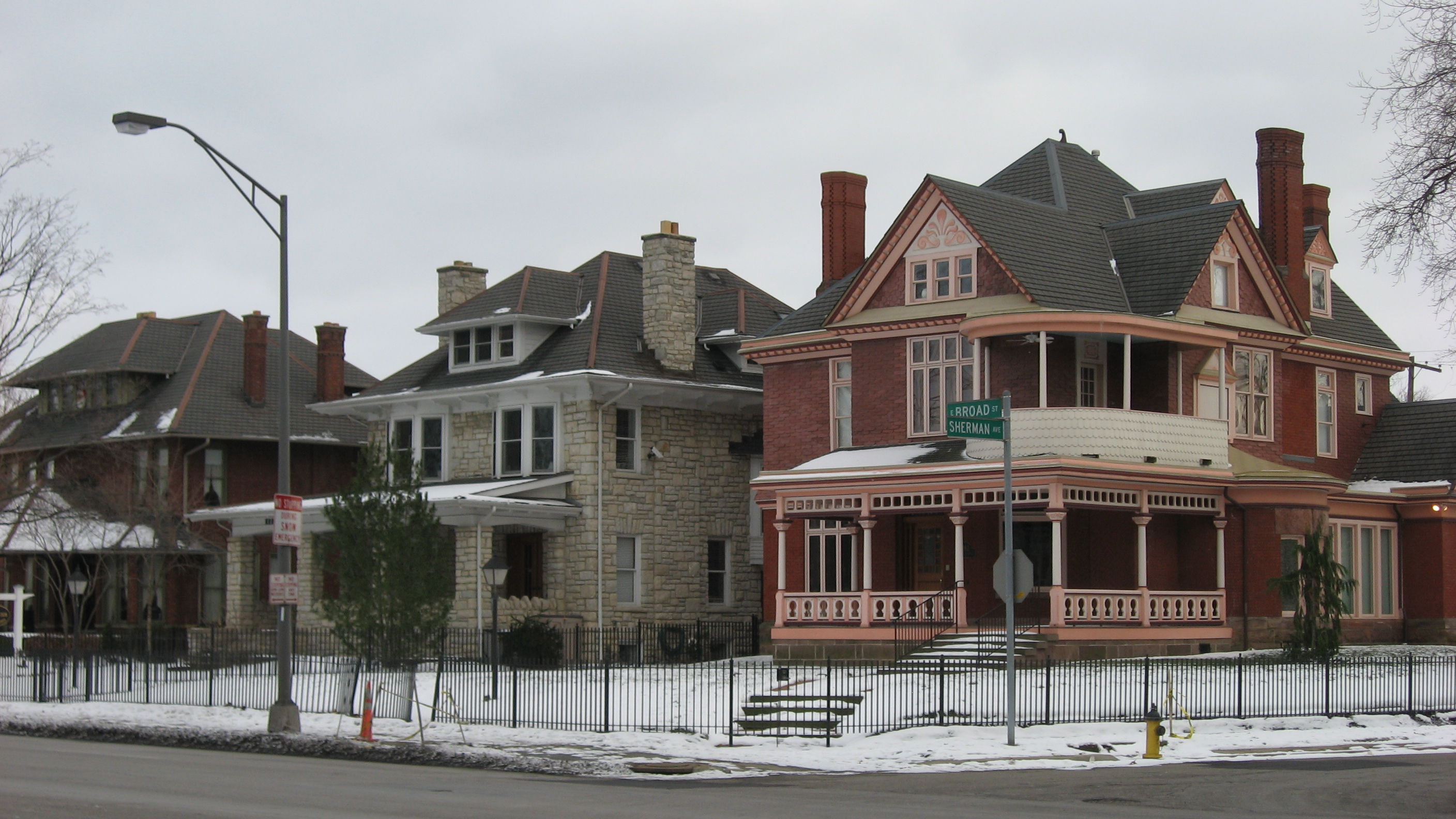
- Houses in the 1200 block of East Broad Street
- Interactive map
- Location: Along East Broad Street between Monypenny and Ohio avenues, Columbus, Ohio
- Coordinates: 39°58′1″N 82°57′39″W
- Area: 26 acres (11 ha)
- Architect: Packard, Frank; Hayden, Florence Kenyon, et al.
- Architectural style: Late 19th and 20th Century Revivals, Art Deco, Queen Anne
- MPS: East Broad Street MRA
- NRHP reference No.: 86003393
- Added to NRHP: March 17, 1987

The East Broad Street Historic District in Columbus, Ohio is a historic district that was listed on the National Register of Historic Places in 1987. The district includes the section of East Broad Street from Ohio Avenue on the west to Monypenny Street on the east. It includes lavish residences, some converted to offices.

== Contributing structures ==
Contributing buildings include:

- 1160-1190 E. Broad St. (Governor's Terrace Apartments)
- 1234 E. Broad St. (Old Governor's Mansion), 2A) garage. 2B) gardener's quarters
- 1266 E. Broad St. (Joseph F. Firestone House, demolished)
- Northwest corner of E. Broad St. and Winner (service station, demolished)
- 1312 E. Broad (Broadwin Apartments)
- 1354 E. Broad St. (Temple Tifereth Israel)
- 1400 E. Broad St. and carriage house/garage (Dr. Baker Residence)
- 1414 E. Broad St. and garage
- 1428 E. Broad St. and garage
- 1440 E. Broad St. and garage (Frederick Shedd house)
- 1450 E. Broad St. and garage
- 1500 E. Broad St. (East High School)
- 1544 E. Broad St.
- 1550 E. Broad St.
- 1560 E. Broad St.
- 1640 E. Broad St. and garage
- 1654 E. Broad St.
- 1660 E. Broad St.
- 1688 E. Broad St. and garage
- 1700 E. Broad St. and garage
- 1706 E. Broad St.
- 1720 E. Broad St.
- 1728 E. Broad St.
- 1776 E. Broad St. and 1780 E. Broad St. (Volunteers of America offices)
- 1790-98 E. Broad St., 8-44-N. Brunson, 1784-1801 E. Long St. (the Broad-Brunson Place Condominiums)
- 1485-89 E. Broad St.
- 1475-1481 E. Broad St.
- 1471 E. Broad St.
- 1465 E. Broad St. and garage
- 1445 E. Broad St. (Royal York Apartments)
- 1415 E. Broad St. (Matthew J. Bergin House)
- 1349 E. Broad St. and garage
- 1339 E. Broad St.
- 1319 E. Broad St. and garage
- 1313 E. Broad St.
- 1293 E. Broad St. and garage
- 17-19 Wilson Ave.
- 1277 E. Broad St. and garage
- 1271 E. Broad St.
- 1263-65 E. Broad St.

== See also ==
- 18th & E. Broad Historic District
- 21st & E. Broad Historic Group
- National Register of Historic Places listings in Columbus, Ohio
