= Avery Street Historic District =

Historic district in West Virginia, United States

- U.S. National Register of Historic Places
- U.S. Historic district
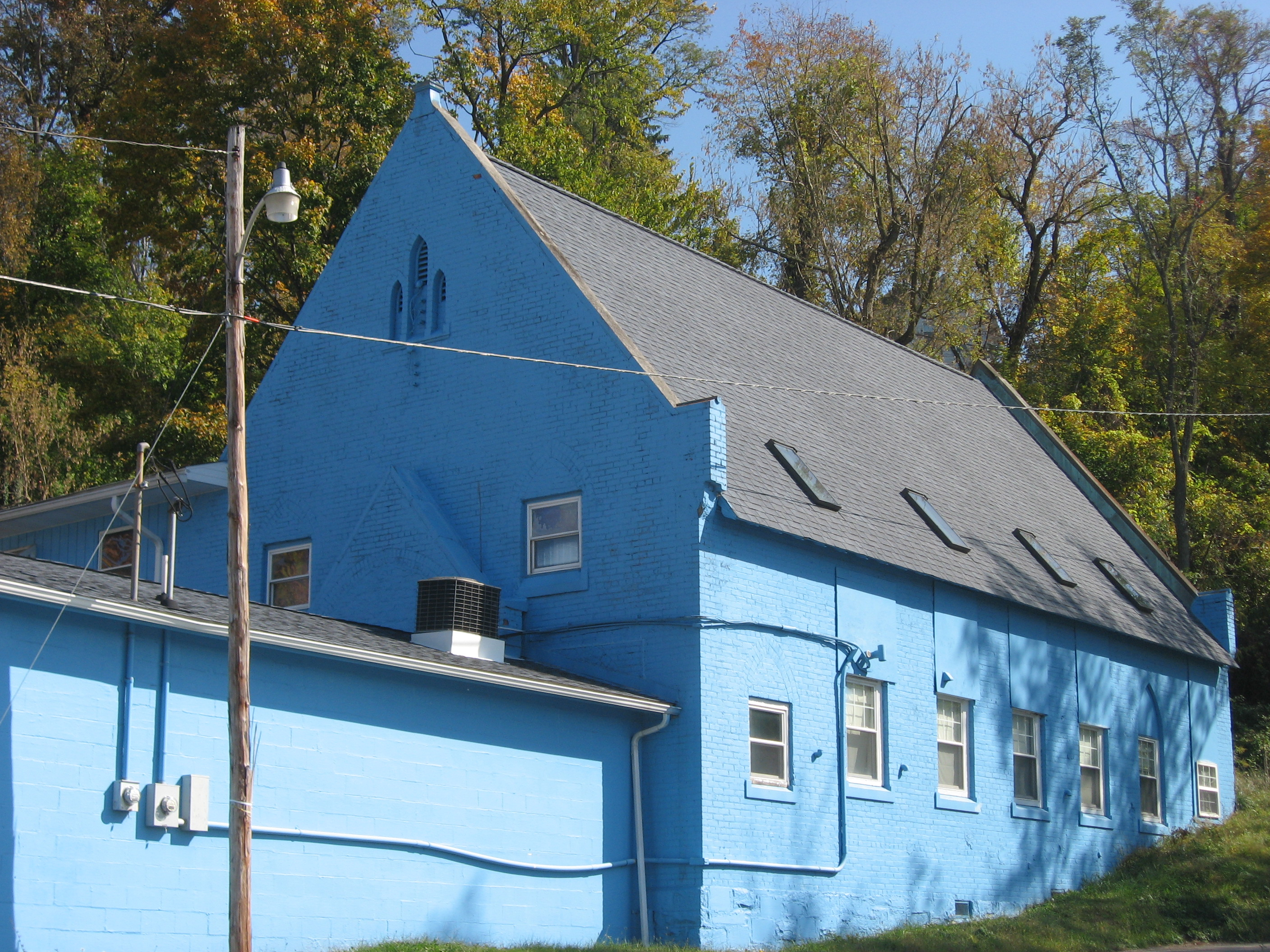
- The former St. John's Lutheran Church on Avery Street

- Location within West Virginia Location within the United States
- Location: Roughly bounded by Nineteenth, Spring and Quincy, Eighth, and Market Sts., Parkersburg, West Virginia
- Coordinates: 39°16′15″N 81°33′18″W
- Area: 109 acres (44 ha)
- Architect: Multiple
- Architectural style: Colonial Revival, Mixed (more Than 2 Styles From Different Periods), Queen Anne
- NRHP reference No.: 86000849
- Added to NRHP: April 15, 1986

Avery Street Historic District, is a national historic district located at Parkersburg, Wood County, West Virginia. It is to the east of the Julia-Ann Square Historic District and south of the Parkersburg High School-Washington Avenue Historic District. Primarily residential, it encompasses 109 acres and includes churches, a school, and a small commercial area. Built as Parkersburg's first "suburb" in the late-19th and early-20th century in popular architectural style such as Colonial Revival and Queen Anne, the district exhibits 12 distinctive types of Historic architecture. There are 358 contributing buildings, 59 of which are considered to be pivotal. U.S. Senator Johnson N. Camden (1826-1908) owned most of the land now included in the district. Located in the district are the separately listed Parkersburg Women's Club and the First Presbyterian Church/Calvary Temple Evangelical Church.

It was added to the National Register of Historic Places in 1986.

== History ==
As Michael J. Pauley, historian, explains "The Avery Street Historic District District, Parkersburg's first "suburban" development, is highly significant for the historic role it played in sustaining the city as one of West Virginia's leading cities, housing the families who were the "life-blood" of the city's growth and development, and is significant for reflecting the rich architectural legacy of this region. The decade of 1900-1910 was the real period of growth for the district. During this decade the "Avery Street Extension" as the area on Avery Street (8th Street to beyond 19th) was then called, took form as a real neighborhood; much of the built environment of today's district took place during this period."

== Architecture ==
The National Register of Historic Places survey identified 12 distinctive historic architectural styles, with some sub-types, within the district. Michael J. Pauley notes "all of these styles were flourishing throughout the united states during the time period in which the district was developed. A strong thread of vernacularcism, however, runs through all of these styles, so that few distinctly "pure" examples of any of the historic architectural styles exist. Rather, the buildings within the Avery Street Historic District represent a creativity of ideas and tastes with often married elements of one style to the overall plan of a differing style or type."

The historic architectural styles found within the Avery Street Historic District are National Style, Gothic Revival Style, Italianate, Queen Anne, Romanesque, Folk Victorian, Classical Revival, Colonial Revival, Tudor/Jacobean Revival, Bungaloid-Craftsman-Prairie, International Style, and Victorian Eclectic.

== See also ==
- National Register of Historic Places listings in Wood County, West Virginia
