= O'Neal House =

O'Neal House may refer to:

- Howard O'Neal Barn, Russell, Arkansas, listed on the National Register of Historic Places in White County, Arkansas
- Abijah O'Neall II House, listed on the National Register of Historic Places in Montgomery County, Indiana
- James O'Neal House, Nicholasville, Kentucky, listed on the National Register of Historic Places in Jessamine County, Kentucky
- George O'Neal House, Nicholasville, Kentucky, listed on the National Register of Historic Places in Jessamine County, Kentucky

== See also ==
- Neal House (disambiguation)
- Neale House (disambiguation)
