= Bethel Presbyterian Church (Waverly, West Virginia) =

Historic church in West Virginia, United States

- U.S. National Register of Historic Places
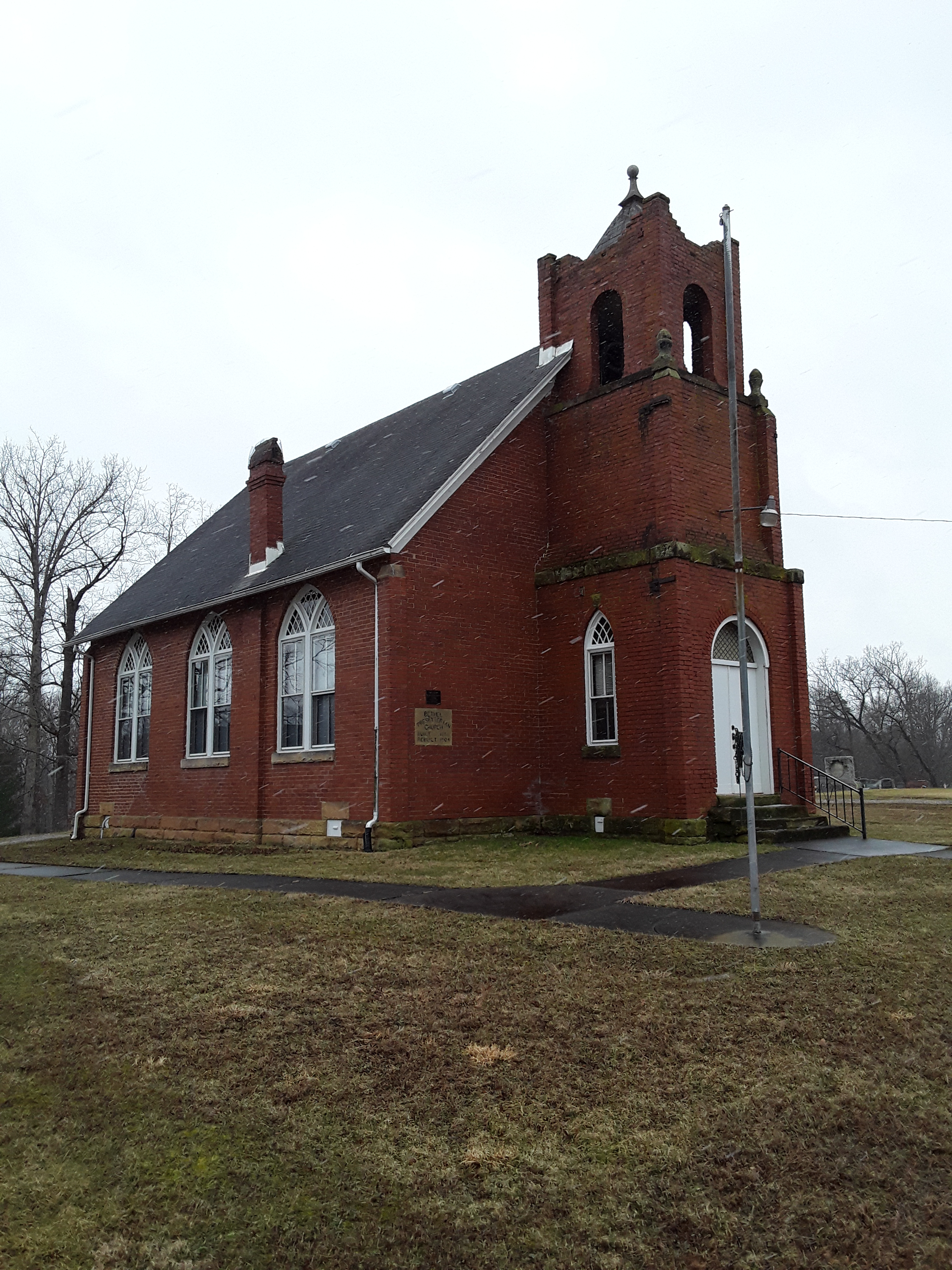

- Location within West Virginia Location within the United States
- Location: 7132 Old St. Marys Pike, Waverly, West Virginia
- Coordinates: 39°19′57″N 81°25′18″W
- Area: 3.26 acres (1.32 ha)
- Architectural style: Gothic Revival
- NRHP reference No.: 14000107
- Added to NRHP: March 31, 2014

Bethel Presbyterian Church is a historic Presbyterian church at 7132 Old St. Marys Pike in Waverly, Wood County, West Virginia. The brick Gothic Revival structure was built in 1904, replacing an earlier wood-frame building. It is the only surviving rural brick church in Wood County.

The church building was listed on the National Register of Historic Places in 2014.

== See also ==
- National Register of Historic Places listings in Wood County, West Virginia
