= National Register of Historic Places listings in Wood County, West Virginia =

Location of Wood County in West Virginia

This is a list of the National Register of Historic Places listings in Wood County, West Virginia.

This is intended to be a complete list of the properties and districts on the National Register of Historic Places in Wood County, West Virginia, United States. The locations of National Register properties and districts for which the latitude and longitude coordinates are included below, may be seen in an online map.

There are 48 properties and districts listed on the National Register in the county. Another 4 properties were once listed but have been removed.

This National Park Service list is complete through NPS recent listings posted August 7, 2026.

Contents: Counties in West Virginia

Barbour - Berkeley - Boone - Braxton - Brooke - Cabell - Calhoun - Clay - Doddridge - Fayette - Gilmer - Grant - Greenbrier - Hampshire - Hancock - Hardy - Harrison - Jackson - Jefferson - Kanawha - Lewis - Lincoln - Logan - Marion - Marshall - Mason - McDowell - Mercer - Mineral - Mingo - Monongalia - Monroe - Morgan - Nicholas - Ohio - Pendleton - Pleasants - Pocahontas - Preston - Putnam - Raleigh - Randolph - Ritchie - Roane - Summers - Taylor - Tucker - Tyler - Upshur - Wayne - Webster - Wetzel - Wirt - Wood - Wyoming

== Current listings ==
	Name on the Register	Image	Date listed	Location	City or town	Description
1	Avery Street Historic District	Avery Street Historic District	April 15, 1986 (#86000849)	Roughly bounded by Nineteenth, Spring and Quincy, Eighth, and Market Sts. 39°16′15″N 81°33′18″W	Parkersburg	
2	Bethel AME Church	Bethel AME Church	October 8, 1998 (#82001767)	820 Clay St. 39°15′58″N 81°33′18″W	Parkersburg	Demolished
3	Bethel Presbyterian Church	Bethel Presbyterian Church	March 31, 2014 (#14000107)	7132 Old St. Marys Pike; 39°19′57″N 81°25′18″W	Waverly	
4	W. H. Bickel Estate	W. H. Bickel Estate	February 11, 2004 (#04000027)	Number One Bickel Mansion Dr. 39°14′52″N 81°35′17″W	Parkersburg	
5	Blennerhassett Hotel	Blennerhassett Hotel	December 10, 1982 (#82001768)	316 Market St. 39°15′54″N 81°33′42″W	Parkersburg	
6	Blennerhassett Island Historic District	Blennerhassett Island Historic District	September 7, 1972 (#72001294)	On the Ohio River, 1.7 miles south of Parkersburg; 39°16′19″N 81°37′12″W	Parkersburg	
7	Carnegie Library	Carnegie Library	October 8, 1982 (#82001769)	725 Green St. 39°15′56″N 81°33′22″W	Parkersburg	
8	Case House	Case House	October 8, 1982 (#82001770)	710 Ann St. 39°16′09″N 81°33′33″W	Parkersburg	Demolished
9	Citizens National Bank	Citizens National Bank	October 8, 1982 (#82001772)	219 4th St. 39°15′56″N 81°33′42″W	Parkersburg	Demolished in 2018
10	Cook House	Cook House	June 7, 1978 (#78002812)	1301 Murdoch Ave. 39°16′29″N 81°33′20″W	Parkersburg	
11	Downtown Parkersburg Historic District		November 16, 2023 (#100009541)	Portions of Juliana, Market, Avery, and Second through Eighth Streets and Williams Court Alley and Phillips Court Alley; 39°15′55″N 81°33′42″W	Parkersburg	
12	Henry Cooper House	Henry Cooper House	February 6, 1986 (#86000828)	Park Ave. 39°16′18″N 81°31′48″W	Parkersburg	
13	Elks Club	Elks Club	October 8, 1982 (#82001773)	515 Juliana St. 39°16′02″N 81°33′39″W	Parkersburg	Demolished
14	First Baptist Church	First Baptist Church	December 10, 1982 (#82001774)	813 Market St. 39°16′05″N 81°33′25″W	Parkersburg	
15	First Presbyterian Church/Calvary Temple Evangelical Church	First Presbyterian Church/Calvary Temple Evangelical Church	December 10, 1982 (#82001775)	946 Market St. 39°16′06″N 81°33′18″W	Parkersburg	
16	Fort Boreman	Fort Boreman	April 17, 2003 (#02001690)	Overlooking the confluence of the Little Kanawha and Ohio Rivers; 39°15′42″N 81°34′07″W	Parkersburg	
17	Gould House/Greater Parkersburg Chamber of Commerce	Gould House/Greater Parkersburg Chamber of Commerce	October 8, 1982 (#82001776)	720 Juliana St. 39°16′05″N 81°33′29″W	Parkersburg	
18	Henderson Hall Historic District	Henderson Hall Historic District	April 17, 1986 (#86000811)	CR 21/2 off WV 14; 39°22′40″N 81°28′58″W	Williamstown	
19	House at 10th and Avery Streets	House at 10th and Avery Streets	December 10, 1982 (#82001777)	10th and Avery Sts. 39°16′10″N 81°33′12″W	Parkersburg	
20	Jackson Memorial Fountain	Jackson Memorial Fountain	August 23, 1984 (#84003686)	Park Ave. and 17th St. 39°16′11″N 81°31′55″W	Parkersburg	
21	Julia-Ann Square Historic District	Julia-Ann Square Historic District	May 24, 1977 (#77001380)	Both sides of Juliana and Ann Sts. from cemetery to 9th St. 39°16′16″N 81°33′21″W	Parkersburg	
22	Isaac F. Lane House	Isaac F. Lane House	June 26, 2019 (#100003252)	1399 Waverly Rd. 39°21′27″N 81°24′18″W	Williamstown vicinity	
23	Henry Logan Memorial AME Church	Henry Logan Memorial AME Church	December 16, 1982 (#82001778)	Ann and 6th Sts. 39°16′06″N 81°33′41″W	Parkersburg	
24	Masonic Temple	Masonic Temple	October 8, 1982 (#82001779)	900 Market St. 39°16′04″N 81°33′22″W	Parkersburg	
25	Mather Building/Franklin & DeHaven Jewelers	Mather Building/Franklin & DeHaven Jewelers	October 8, 1982 (#82001780)	405 Market St. 39°15′55″N 81°33′43″W	Parkersburg	Demolished in 2018
26	Meldahl House		May 17, 1991 (#91000550)	Washington Bottom Rd. off WV 892; 39°13′28″N 81°40′57″W	Washington	
27	Dr. W. W. Monroe House	Dr. W. W. Monroe House	August 1, 2012 (#12000469)	1703 Park Avenue; 39°16′10″N 81°31′58″W	Parkersburg	
28	George Neale Jr. House	George Neale Jr. House	January 10, 1980 (#80004045)	331 Juliana St. 39°15′58″N 81°33′46″W	Parkersburg	
29	Oakland	Oakland	May 29, 1979 (#79002604)	1131 7th St. 39°15′52″N 81°32′36″W	Parkersburg	
30	Oeldorf Building/Wetherell's Jewelers	Oeldorf Building/Wetherell's Jewelers	December 10, 1982 (#82001781)	809 Market St. 39°16′04″N 81°33′25″W	Parkersburg	Demolished
31	Parkersburg High School-Washington Avenue Historic District	Parkersburg High School-Washington Avenue Historic District	July 16, 1992 (#92000895)	Washington Ave. from Park Ave. to Dudley Ave., including 2101 Dudley; 39°16′34″N 81°32′23″W	Parkersburg	
32	Parkersburg Women's Club	Parkersburg Women's Club	October 8, 1982 (#82001782)	323 9th St. 39°16′02″N 81°33′21″W	Parkersburg	
33	St. Francis Xavier Church	St. Francis Xavier Church	December 22, 1978 (#78002813)	532 Market St. 39°15′58″N 81°33′35″W	Parkersburg	
34	Sharon Lodge No. 28 IOOF	Sharon Lodge No. 28 IOOF	October 8, 1982 (#82001784)	316 5th St. 39°15′55″N 81°33′37″W	Parkersburg	
35	Sixth Street Railroad Bridge	Sixth Street Railroad Bridge	December 10, 1982 (#82001785)	6th Street; 39°16′15″N 81°33′54″W	Parkersburg	Extends into Washington County, Ohio
36	Smith Building	Smith Building	December 10, 1982 (#82001786)	310½ Market St. 39°15′53″N 81°33′44″W	Parkersburg	Demolished
37	W.H. Smith Hardware Company Building	W.H. Smith Hardware Company Building	May 2, 2003 (#03000349)	119 3rd St. 39°15′58″N 81°33′49″W	Parkersburg	
38	Smoot Theater	Smoot Theater	October 8, 1982 (#82001787)	213 5th St. 39°15′59″N 81°33′39″W	Parkersburg	
39	Tavenner House	Tavenner House	November 10, 1982 (#82001788)	2401 Camden Ave. 39°15′19″N 81°33′04″W	Parkersburg	
40	Tomlinson Mansion	Tomlinson Mansion	July 24, 1974 (#74002022)	901 W. 3rd St. 39°24′02″N 81°27′49″W	Williamstown	
41	Tracewell House		April 26, 1991 (#91000450)	WV 95 west of Gihon Rd. 39°14′54″N 81°35′24″W	Parkersburg	
42	Trinity Episcopal Church Rectory	Trinity Episcopal Church Rectory	December 10, 1982 (#82001789)	430 Juliana St. 39°15′59″N 81°33′41″W	Parkersburg	
43	Trinity Protestant Episcopal Church	Trinity Protestant Episcopal Church	December 10, 1982 (#82001790)	424 Juliana St. 39°15′59″N 81°33′41″W	Parkersburg	
44	Union Trust & Deposit Co./Union Trust National Bank	Union Trust & Deposit Co./Union Trust National Bank	October 8, 1982 (#82001791)	700 Market St. 39°16′01″N 81°33′29″W	Parkersburg	
45	Peter G. Van Winkle House	Peter G. Van Winkle House	October 8, 1982 (#82001792)	600 Juliana St. 39°16′02″N 81°33′35″W	Parkersburg	Demolished
46	Walton Wait House	Walton Wait House	December 10, 1982 (#82001793)	1232 Murdoch Ave. 39°16′27″N 81°33′19″W	Parkersburg	Demolished
47	Windmill Quaker State	Windmill Quaker State	October 8, 1982 (#82001795)	800 Murdoch Ave. 39°16′11″N 81°33′32″W	Parkersburg	
48	Wood County Courthouse	Wood County Courthouse	August 29, 1979 (#79002606)	Court Sq. at 3rd and Market St. 39°15′53″N 81°33′46″W	Parkersburg	

== Former listings ==
	Name on the Register	Image	Date listed	Date removed	Location	City or town	Description
1	Chancellor Hardware		December 10, 1982 (#82001771)	September 21, 1992	114 3rd St.	Parkersburg	Demolished
2	Guaranty Building		October 8, 1982 (#82001891)	March 6, 1992	217 4th St.	Parkersburg	Demolished January 29, 1992.
3	Parkersburg City Hall		December 11, 1979 (#79002605)	April 2, 1981	5th and Market Sts.	Parkersburg	Demolished 1980
4	Robb Apartments		October 8, 1982 (#82001783)	December 22, 1987	201 8th St.	Parkersburg	Demolished September 28, 1987
5	West Central WV Community Action Assoc., Inc.		October 8, 1982 (#82001794)	January 5, 1988	804 Ann St.	Parkersburg	

== See also ==
- List of National Historic Landmarks in West Virginia
- National Register of Historic Places listings in West Virginia
