= Neale House =

Neale House may refer to:

- William P. Neale House, Woodburn, Kentucky, listed on the NRHP in Warren County, Kentucky
- George Neale Jr. House, Parkersburg, West Virginia, listed on the NRHP in Wood County, West Virginia

== See also ==
- Neal House (disambiguation)
- O'Neal House (disambiguation)
