= Tavenner House =

Historic house in West Virginia, United States

- U.S. National Register of Historic Places
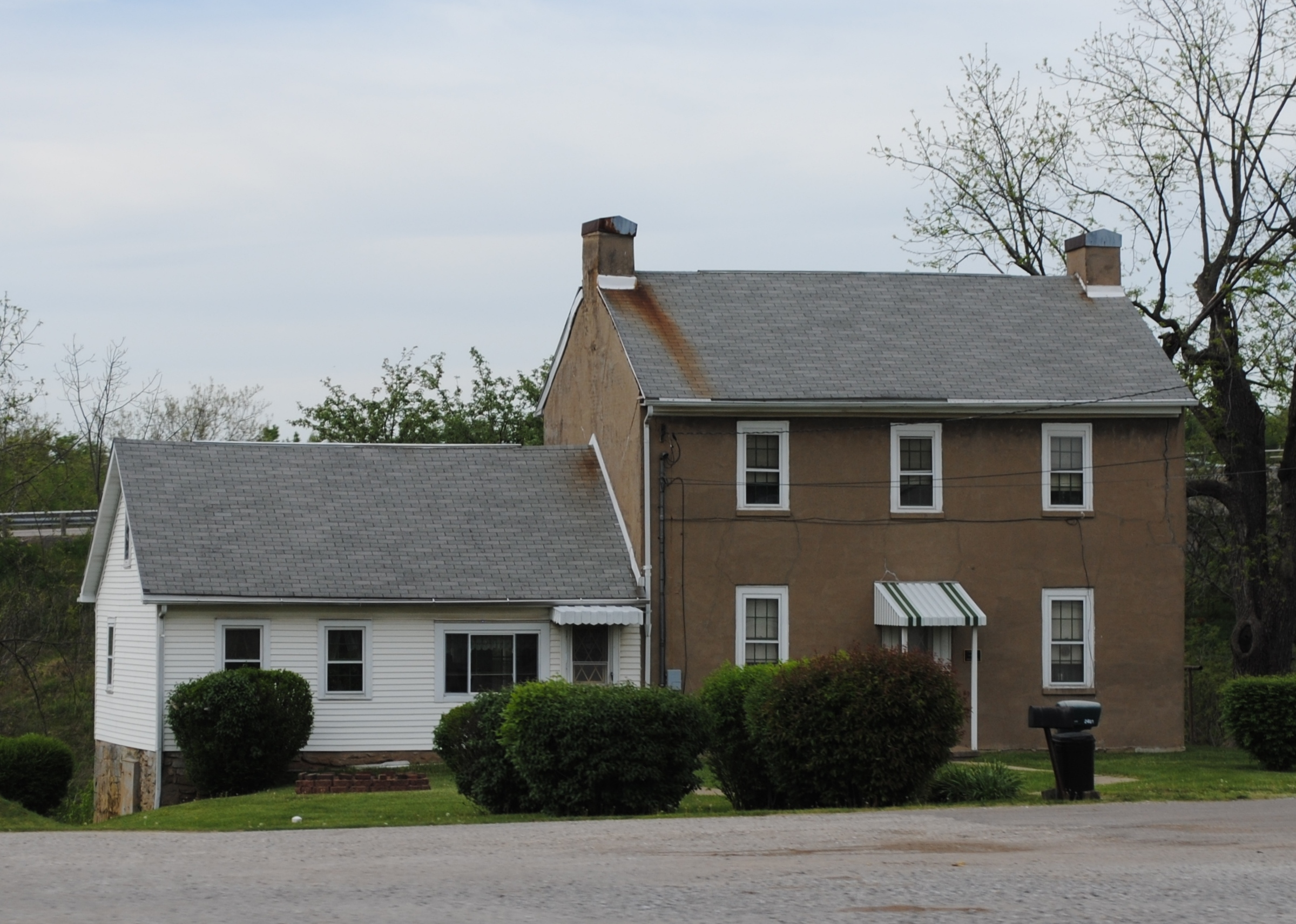

- Location within West Virginia Location within the United States
- Location: 2401 Camden Ave., Parkersburg, West Virginia
- Coordinates: 39°15′19″N 81°33′4″W
- Area: 0.8 acres (0.32 ha)
- Built: c. 1812
- Architectural style: Federal
- NRHP reference No.: 82001788
- Added to NRHP: November 10, 1982

Tavenner House is a historic home located at Parkersburg, Wood County, West Virginia. The main house was built about 1812, and is a two-story, brick house coated in stucco in the Federal style. It has a gable roof and sits on a foundation of cut stone slabs. The property includes a 1 1/2-story frame dependency with a gable roof and covered in novelty siding. It is the oldest remaining building in the Parkersburg area and is associated with Colonel Thomas Tavenner, a prominent early settler of this area.

It was listed on the National Register of Historic Places in 1982.

== See also ==
- National Register of Historic Places listings in Wood County, West Virginia
