= First Baptist Church (Parkersburg, West Virginia) =

Historic church in West Virginia, United States

- U.S. National Register of Historic Places
- U.S. Historic district – Contributing property
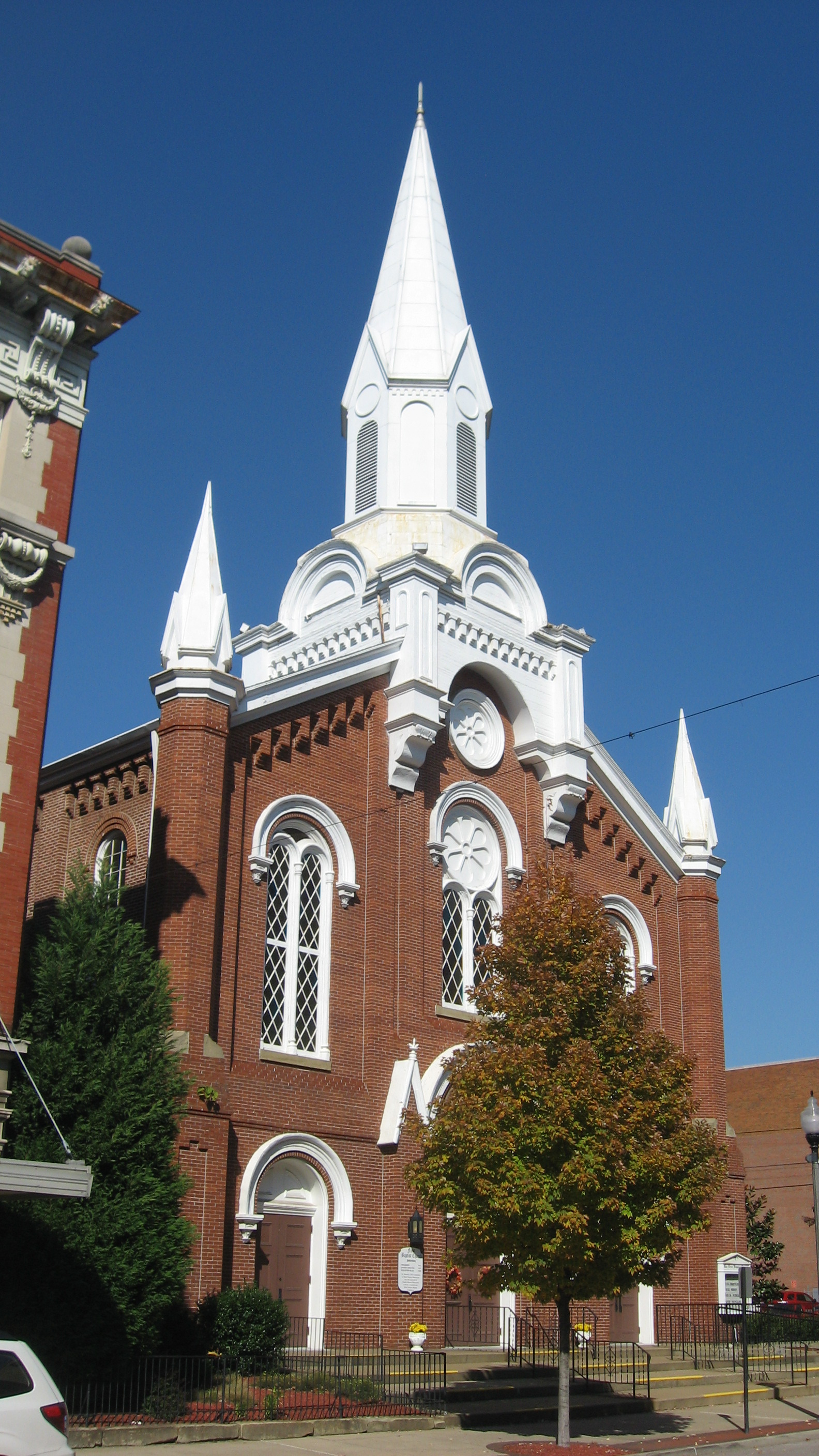
- Front of the church

- Location within West Virginia Location within the United States
- Location: 813 Market St., Parkersburg, West Virginia
- Coordinates: 39°16′4″N 81°33′24″W
- Area: 0.3 acres (0.12 ha)
- Built: 1871
- Architect: Lysander Dudley
- Architectural style: Italianate
- Part of: Avery Street Historic District (ID86000849)
- MPS: Downtown Parkersburg MRA
- NRHP reference No.: 82001774
- Added to NRHP: December 10, 1982

First Baptist Church is a historic Baptist church at 813 Market Street in Parkersburg, Wood County, West Virginia. It was built in 1871, and is a two-story, three by six-bay, brick church in the Italianate style, which was popular at the time. It has a central steeple on the front facade and several rear additions. It is topped by a gable roof trimmed by an arched corbel table and corner turret. This congregation was founded in 1817 and built their first church in 1837. First Baptist was built on that site.

It was listed on the National Register of Historic Places in 1982, and it is a contributing property to the Avery Street Historic District, which was designated and listed on the National Register in 1986.

== See also ==
- National Register of Historic Places listings in Wood County, West Virginia
