= House at 10th and Avery Streets =

Historic house in West Virginia, United States

- U.S. National Register of Historic Places
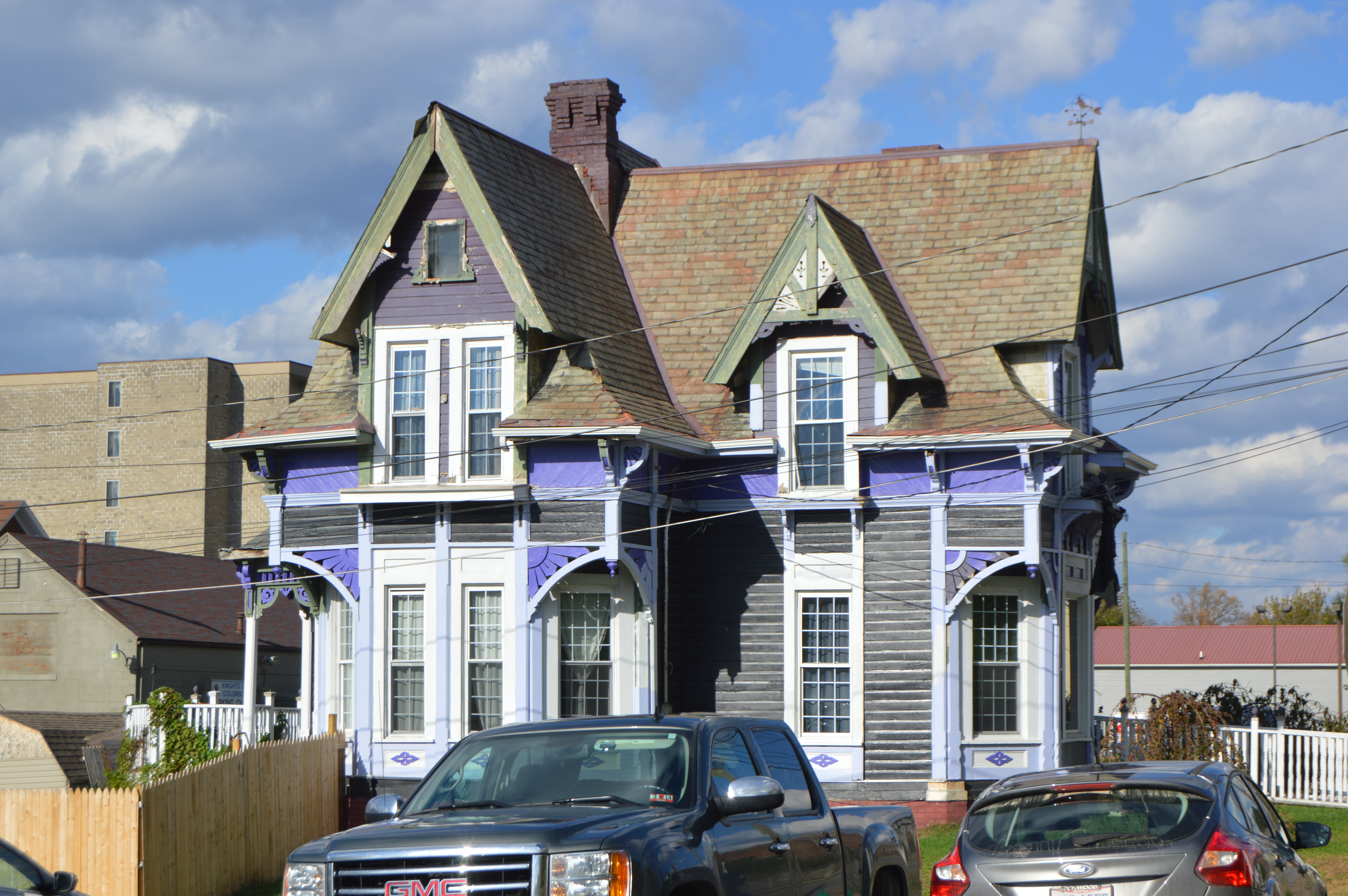
- Front of the house

- Location within West Virginia Location within the United States
- Location: 10th and Avery Sts., Parkersburg, West Virginia
- Coordinates: 39°16′10″N 81°33′12″W
- Area: 0.2 acres (0.081 ha)
- Architectural style: Stick/eastlake, Carpenter Gothic
- MPS: Downtown Parkersburg MRA
- NRHP reference No.: 82001777
- Added to NRHP: December 10, 1982

House at 10th and Avery Streets is a historic home located at Parkersburg, Wood County, West Virginia. It was built between about 1860 and 1879, and is a two-story, frame house in the Eastlake / Carpenter Gothic style. Its roof has a complex composition of hips and gabled wall dormers, pierced by two brick chimney. The house features sawn woodwork that make it the most highly ornamented residential building in downtown Parkersburg.

It was listed on the National Register of Historic Places in 1982.

== See also ==
- National Register of Historic Places listings in Wood County, West Virginia
