= Tracewell House =

Historic house in West Virginia, United States

- U.S. National Register of Historic Places
- Location within West Virginia Location within the United States
- Location: WV 95 west of Gihon Rd., near Parkersburg, West Virginia
- Coordinates: 39°14′54″N 81°35′24″W
- Area: less than one acre
- Built: c. 1835
- Architectural style: Greek Revival, Other, I-house
- NRHP reference No.: 91000450
- Added to NRHP: April 26, 1991

Tracewell House, also known as "Maple Shadows" and Tracewell Manor, is a historic home located near Parkersburg, Wood County, West Virginia. It was built about 1835, and is a two-story, single pile, painted brick I house in the Greek Revival style. It has a slate covered gable roof and a two-story rear ell.

It was listed on the National Register of Historic Places in 1991. It was severely damaged by fire on December 24, 2025.

== See also ==
- National Register of Historic Places listings in Wood County, West Virginia
