= Mather Building =

- Mather Building/Franklin & DeHaven Jewelers
- U.S. National Register of Historic Places
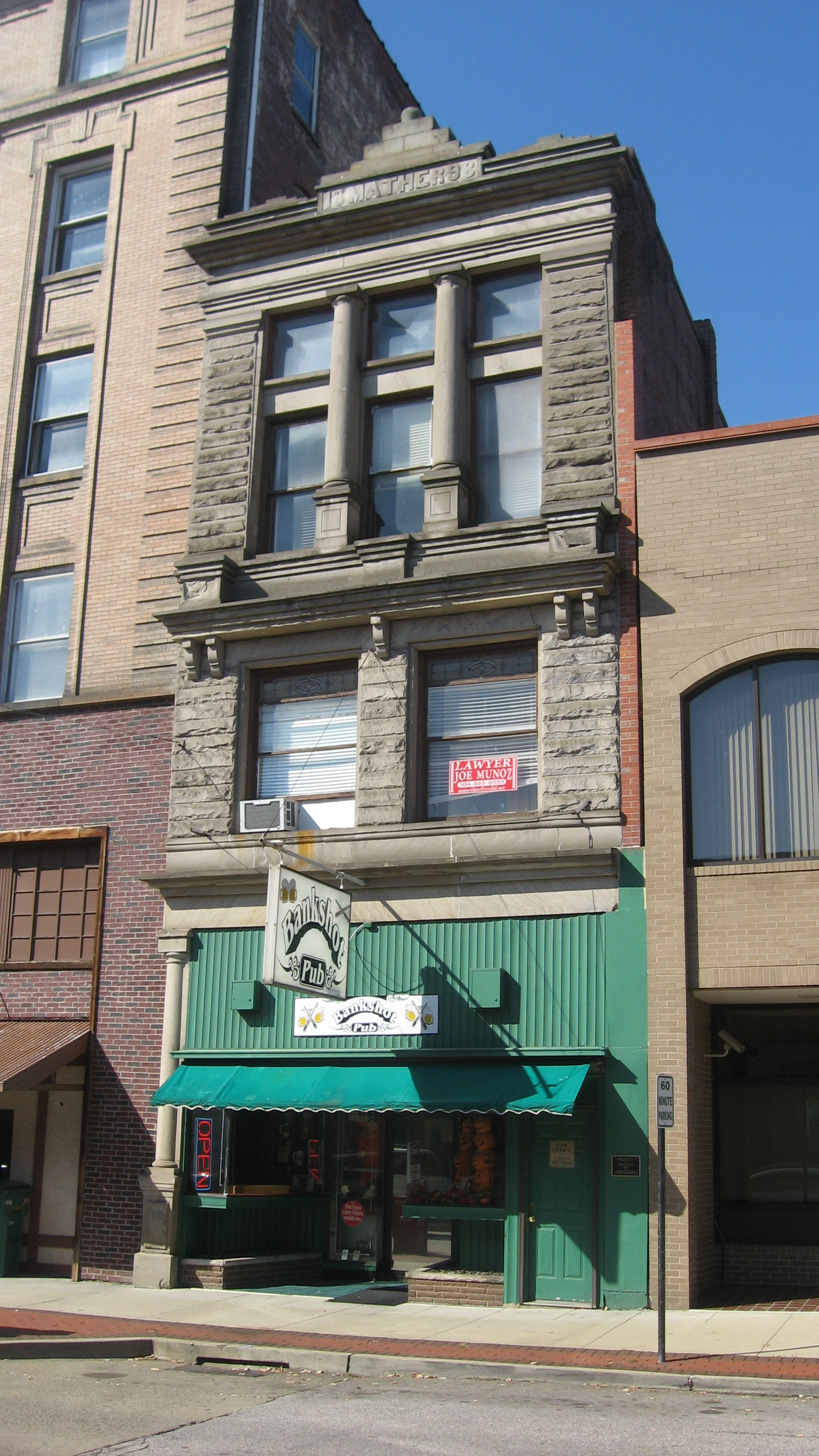
- Front of the building

- Location within West Virginia Location within the United States
- Location: 405 Market St., Parkersburg, West Virginia
- Coordinates: 39°15′56″N 81°33′39″W
- Area: less than one acre
- Built: 1898
- Architectural style: Classical Revival
- MPS: Downtown Parkersburg MRA
- NRHP reference No.: 82001780
- Added to NRHP: October 8, 1982

The Mather Building, also known as Franklin & DeHaven Jewelers, was a historic commercial building located at Parkersburg, Wood County, West Virginia. It was built in 1898, and was a three- to four-story, red brick and sandstone building in the Classical style. The interior featured a fine tin ceiling and a built-in vault.

It was listed on the National Register of Historic Places in 1982, and demolished on June 23, 2018.

== See also ==
- National Register of Historic Places listings in Wood County, West Virginia
