= W. H. Bickel Estate =

Historic house in West Virginia, United States

- U.S. National Register of Historic Places
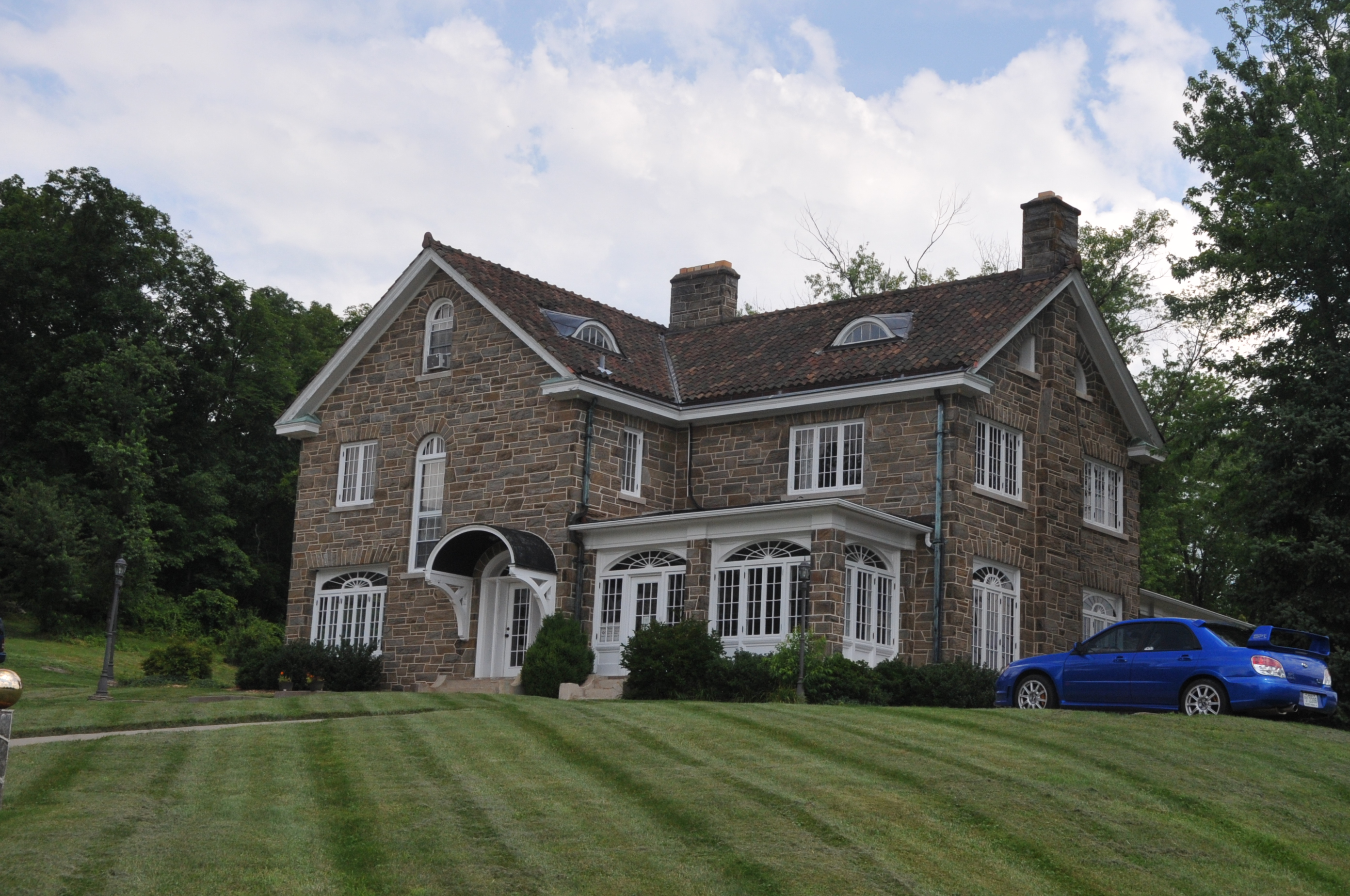

- Location within West Virginia Location within the United States
- Location: Number One Bickel Mansion Dr., Parkersburg, West Virginia
- Coordinates: 39°14′52″N 81°35′17″W
- Area: 5.4 acres (2.2 ha)
- Built: 1928
- Architect: Tenney, Thomas
- Architectural style: Tudor Revival
- NRHP reference No.: 04000027
- Added to NRHP: February 11, 2004

The W.H. Bickel Estate is a 2 1/2-story stone mansion built between 1928 and 1930 on the outskirts of Parkersburg, West Virginia. The 1,800-square-foot (170 m^{2}) building has a rectangular main section and a wing to the East. The main house is rich with woodwork, including intricately inlaid walnut and maple floors with geometric patterns, wood mantels, partial wainscoting on all three floors, 15 light French doors on the first floor, solid maple arched doors on the second floor, built-in china cabinets, crown molding in all main rooms, and original finish wood casement windows with roll down screens and brass hardware. There are five gas fireplaces with marble or stone hearths in the main house and two staircases, including a circular walnut and maple main staircase. The ceilings are coved on the second and third floors, and the third floor contains a ballroom or “dance hall” stretching twenty eight feet.

The exterior is 4 1/2-inch stone veneer quarried in Philadelphia and applied with a special mortise technique. The circular drive arrives at a matching stone portico with a tongue and groove ceiling and Spanish tile porch. The roof is tile with a hip and valley on the wing side and a hip roof on the rectangular side. There are half-moon windows emerging from the tiled roof that provide side lighting to the upstairs rooms.

The grounds are equally impressive with a stone carriage house, stone entrance pillars, two stone fountains (one about thirty feet in diameter with a fountain head once capable of a 50-foot fountain spray, and the second fountain contains within it a hand-carved sandstone sculpture of a mill with a waterwheel), matching stone flower boxes, and a pair of fighting lions carved from sandstone. Behind the main house is a wooden barn that was sold from the main property and converted to four apartments, but which has been repurchased and rejoined with the main property.

In its prime, the Bickel Estate was a showplace, with the grounds rising to the knoll that hosts the house. At Christmas time, the entire property would be lighted with colored lights and a 50-foot spray of the large fountain to the giant Christmas tree lighted by the main house. “Gazing Balls” also adorned the front and side landscapes which was often seasonally changed.

The property once was the center of a 400-acre (160 ha) property that contained unique features such as a ½ mile horse track with grandstands and a large zoo. Today, the property maintains a noble stature in what has developed as a residential and light commercial area.

Due to the work of one of the new owners, the Bickel Estate was added to the List of Registered Historic Places in West Virginia in 2001. The Bickel Mansion is located near the intersection of WV-95 and Marrtown Road in South Parkersburg.

== See also ==
- High Gate
- Sonnencroft
- National Register of Historic Places listings in Wood County, West Virginia
