= Smoot Theater =

- Smoot Theatre
- U.S. National Register of Historic Places
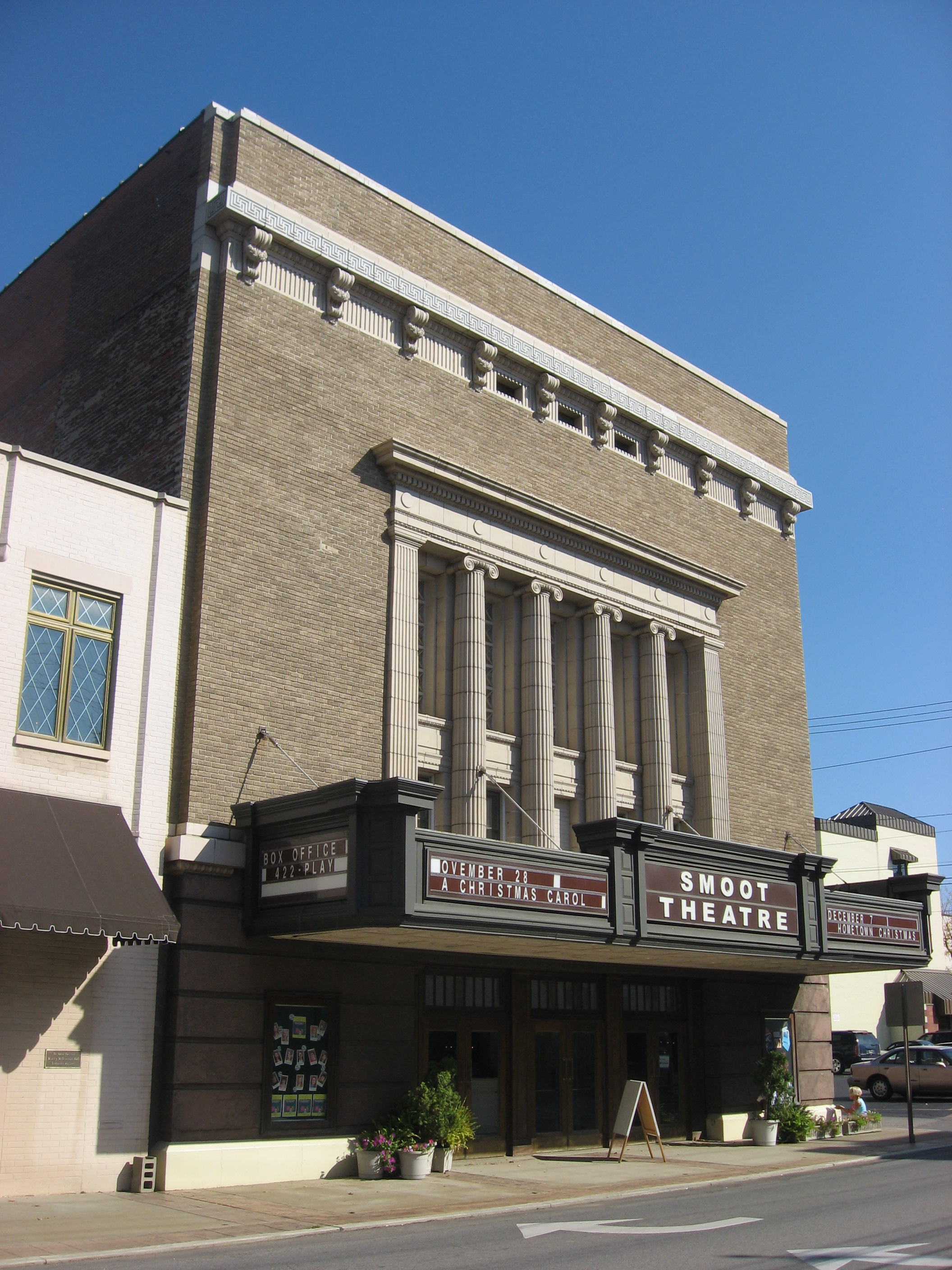
- Front of the theater

- Location within West Virginia Location within the United States
- Location: 213 5th St., Parkersburg, West Virginia
- Coordinates: 39°16′0″N 81°33′38″W
- Area: less than one acre
- Built: 1926
- Architectural style: Classical Revival
- MPS: Downtown Parkersburg MRA
- NRHP reference No.: 82001787
- Added to NRHP: October 8, 1982

The Smoot Theatre is a historic vaudeville house and movie theater located in Parkersburg, Wood County, West Virginia. It was built in 1926, and is a brick and terra cotta building with a simple Classical style front. It features a Greek key cornice and a second story inset with four fluted columns in antis.

It was listed on the National Register of Historic Places in 1982.

== See also ==
- National Register of Historic Places listings in Wood County, West Virginia
