= Oeldorf Building =

- Oeldorf Building/Wetherell's Jewelers
- U.S. National Register of Historic Places
- U.S. Historic district – Contributing property
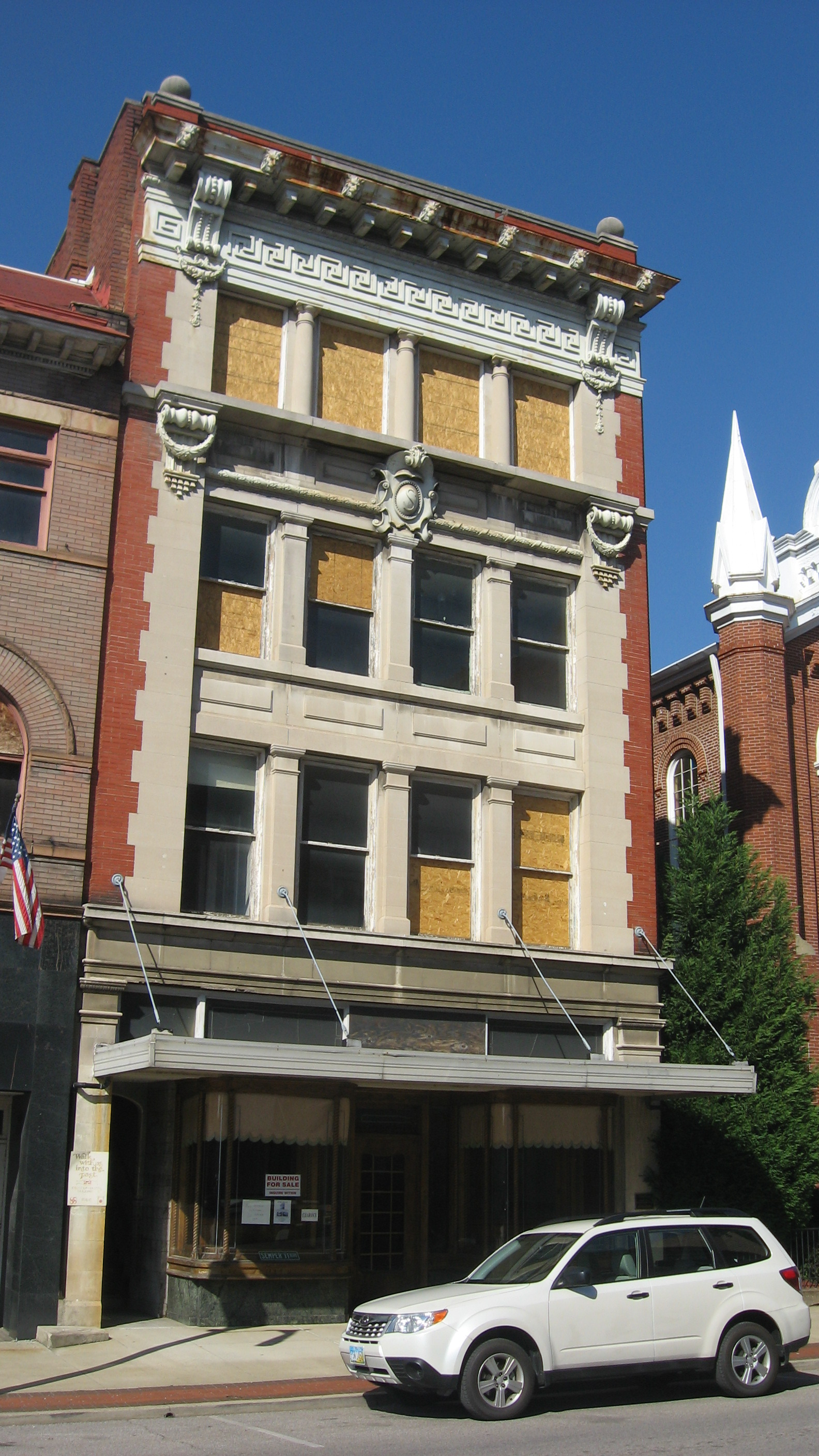
- Front of the building

- Location within West Virginia Location within the United States
- Location: 809 Market St., Parkersburg, West Virginia
- Coordinates: 39°16′4″N 81°33′26″W
- Area: 0.1 acres (0.040 ha)
- Built: 1906
- Architectural style: Classical Revival
- Demolished: 2019
- Part of: Avery Street Historic District (ID86000849)
- MPS: Downtown Parkersburg MRA
- NRHP reference No.: 82001781
- Added to NRHP: December 10, 1982

The Oeldorf Building, also known as Wetherell's Jewelers, was a historic commercial building located at Parkersburg in Wood County, West Virginia, United States. It was built in 1906 and was a four-story, two-bay, brick building with a stone foundation and trim in the Classical Revival style. It had an intact first floor storefront and sidewalk clock.

It was listed on the National Register of Historic Places in 1982, and it was a contributing property to the Avery Street Historic District, which was designated and listed on the National Register in 1986.

Condemned by the city in 2016, the Oeldorf Building was purchased by the Parkersburg Art Center in 2018 and subsequently demolished on March 23 and 24, 2019.

== See also ==
- National Register of Historic Places listings in Wood County, West Virginia
