= Trinity Episcopal Church Rectory =

- U.S. National Register of Historic Places
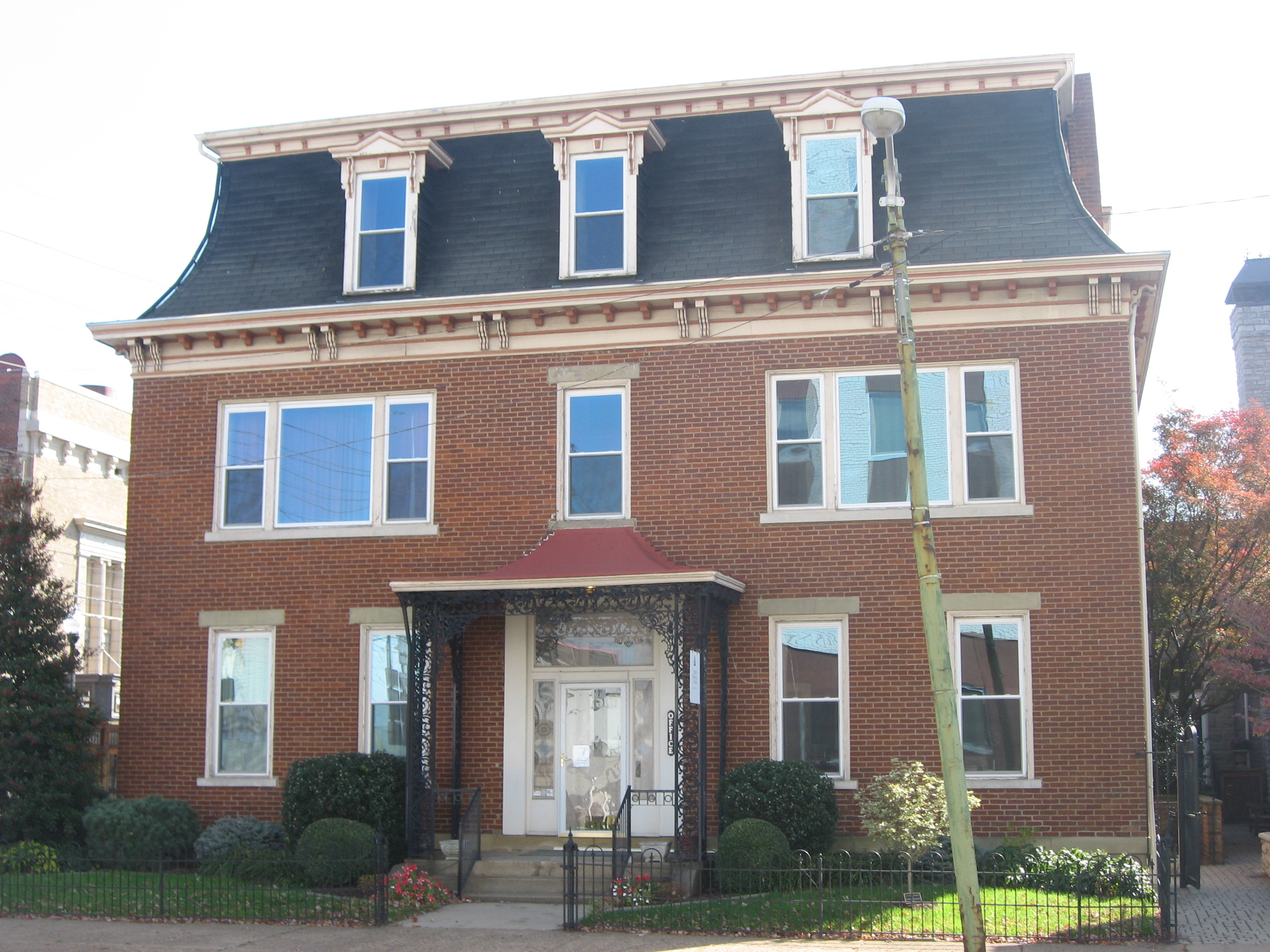
- Front of the house

- Location within West Virginia Location within the United States
- Location: 430 Juliana St., Parkersburg, West Virginia
- Coordinates: 39°15′59″N 81°33′41″W
- Area: 1.4 acres (0.57 ha)
- Built: 1863
- Architectural style: Second Empire
- MPS: Downtown Parkersburg MRA
- NRHP reference No.: 82001789
- Added to NRHP: December 10, 1982

Trinity Episcopal Church Rectory is a historic church rectory at 430 Juliana Street in Parkersburg, Wood County, West Virginia. It is joined to the Trinity Episcopal Church located at 424 Juliana St., by a newer wing It was built in 1863, and is a 2 1/2-story, painted brick building in the Second Empire style. It features a concave profile mansard roof.

It was listed on the National Register of Historic Places in 1982.

== See also ==
- National Register of Historic Places listings in Wood County, West Virginia
