= Carnegie Library (Parkersburg, West Virginia) =

- U.S. National Register of Historic Places
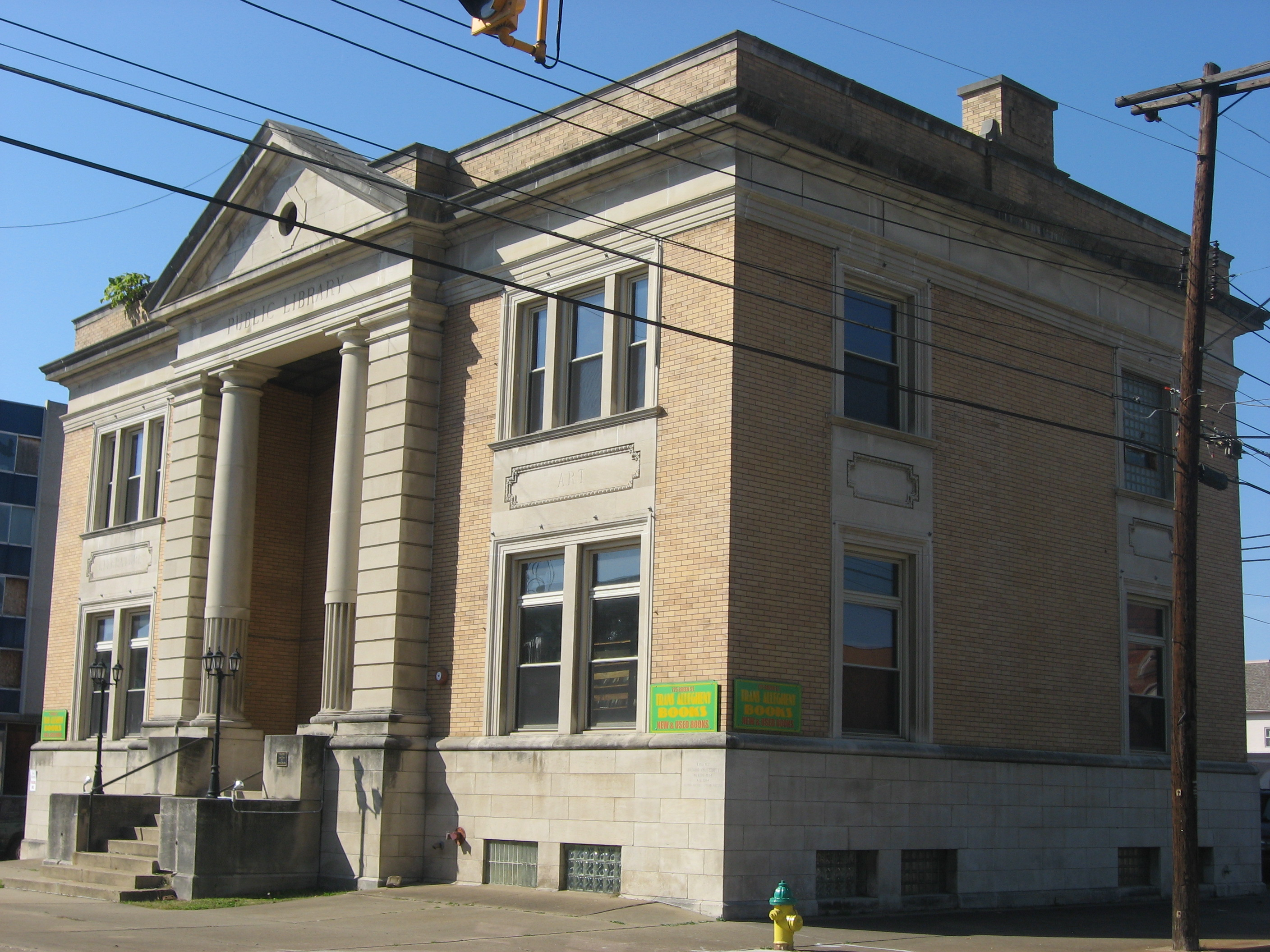
- Front and eastern side of the former library

- Location within West Virginia Location within the United States
- Location: 725 Green St., Parkersburg, West Virginia
- Coordinates: 39°15′56″N 81°33′22″W
- Area: less than one acre
- Architect: Prewett, G.W.; Sanderson, E.T.
- Architectural style: Classical Revival
- MPS: Downtown Parkersburg MRA
- NRHP reference No.: 82001769
- Added to NRHP: October 8, 1982

The Parkersburg Carnegie Library is a historic library building located at Parkersburg, Wood County, West Virginia. It was designed and built in 1905, with funds provided by the philanthropist Andrew Carnegie. It is one of 3,000 such libraries constructed between 1885 and 1919. Carnegie provided $34,000 toward the construction of the Parkersburg library. It is a two-story, L-shaped brick structure in the Classical Revival style. The facade is detailed in gray stone and features a pediment with two Doric order columns. The interior has glass floors and a spiral staircase. It ceased use as a library about 1975, and in December 1985, it was re-opened, as Trans Allegheny Books, which was the largest used book store in West Virginia until it closed in 2010.

The building was put up for sale by auction in early 2021.

It was listed on the National Register of Historic Places in 1982.

== See also ==
- National Register of Historic Places listings in Wood County, West Virginia
