= Smith Building (Parkersburg, West Virginia) =

- U.S. National Register of Historic Places
- Location within West Virginia Location within the United States
- Location: 310½ Market St., Parkersburg, West Virginia
- Coordinates: 39°15′52″N 81°33′42″W
- Area: 0.4 acres (0.16 ha)
- Built: 1898
- MPS: Downtown Parkersburg MRA
- NRHP reference No.: 82001786
- Added to NRHP: December 10, 1982

Smith Building was a historic commercial building located at Parkersburg, Wood County, West Virginia. It was built in 1898, and is a three-story, 18 bay, brick building. It featured corbeled hanging buttresses at the corners and curved brickwork. It once housed a bowling alley, but storefronts later occupied the first floor.

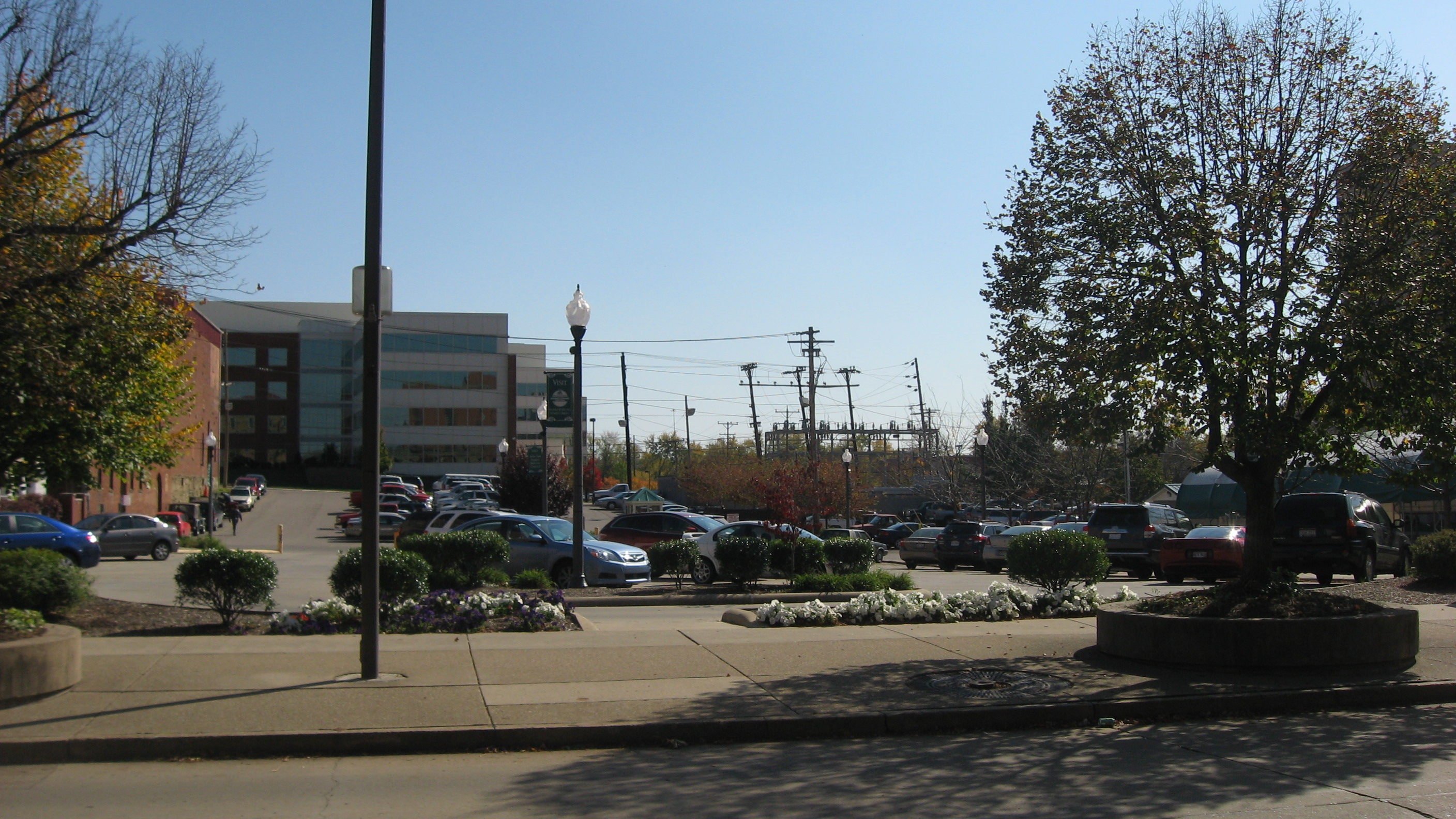
Former site, in 2012, of the building, which has been moved or demolished

It was listed on the National Register of Historic Places in 1982.

== See also ==
- National Register of Historic Places listings in Wood County, West Virginia
