= Bethel AME Church (Parkersburg, West Virginia) =

Historic church in West Virginia, United States

- Bethel African Methodist Episcopal Church
- U.S. National Register of Historic Places
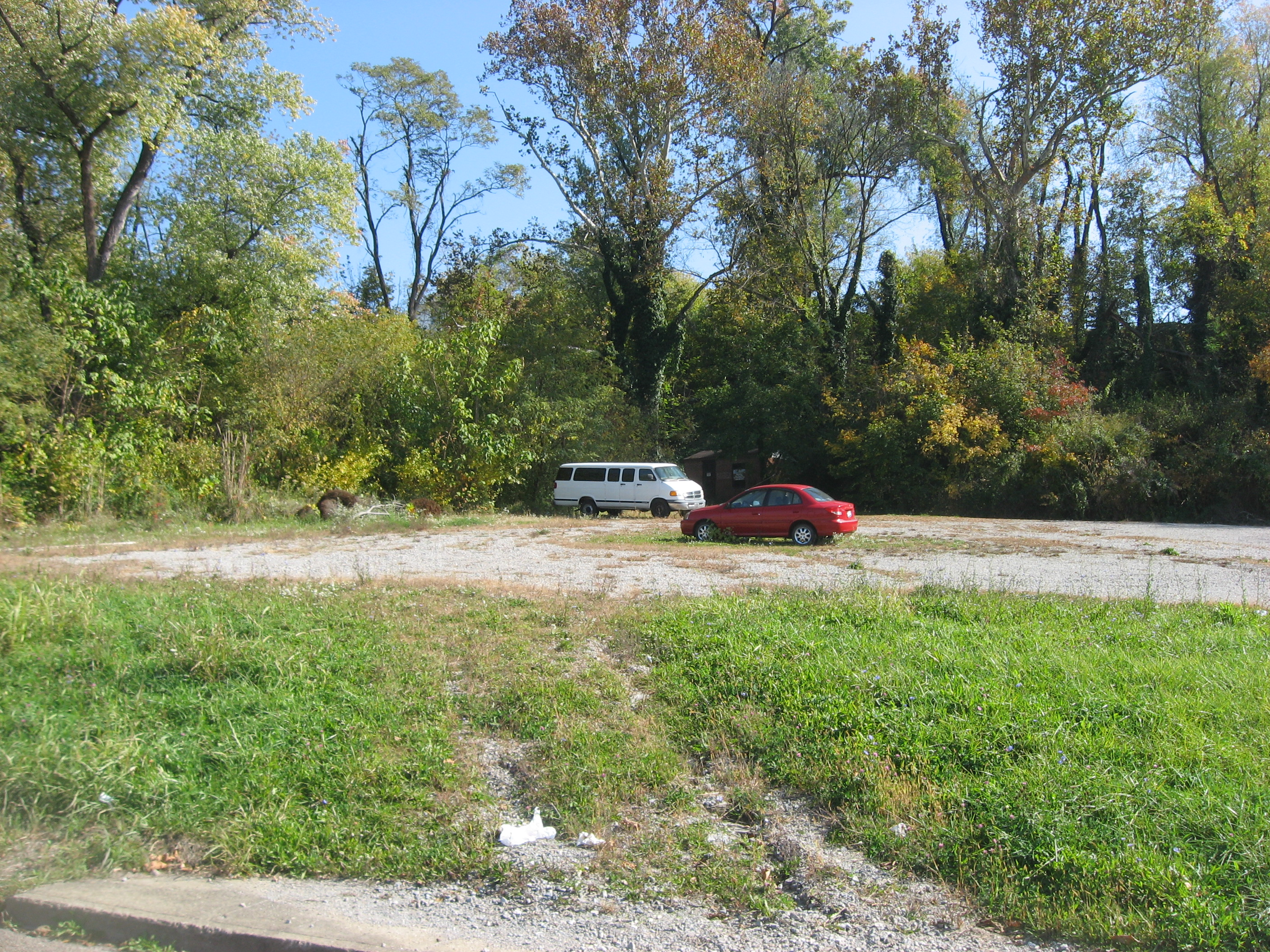

- Location within West Virginia Location within the United States
- Location: 820 Clay St., Parkersburg, West Virginia
- Coordinates: 39°15′58″N 81°33′18″W
- Area: less than one acre
- Architectural style: Gothic
- MPS: Downtown Parkersburg MRA
- NRHP reference No.: 82001767
- Added to NRHP: October 8, 1998

Bethel African Methodist Episcopal Church was a historic African Methodist Episcopal church located at 820 Clay Street in Parkersburg, Wood County, West Virginia. It was built in 1887 and was a two-story, stucco building in a vernacular interpretation of the Gothic Revival style. It was one of three black churches in Parkersburg and was the oldest black church building in west-central West Virginia. The church was located in a neighborhood of late 19th-century wood-frame houses only a block from downtown.

It was added to the National Register of Historic Places in 1998. It is presumed to have been demolished or moved since then.

== See also ==
- National Register of Historic Places listings in Wood County, West Virginia
