= St. Francis Xavier Church (Parkersburg, West Virginia) =

Historic church in West Virginia, United States

- U.S. National Register of Historic Places
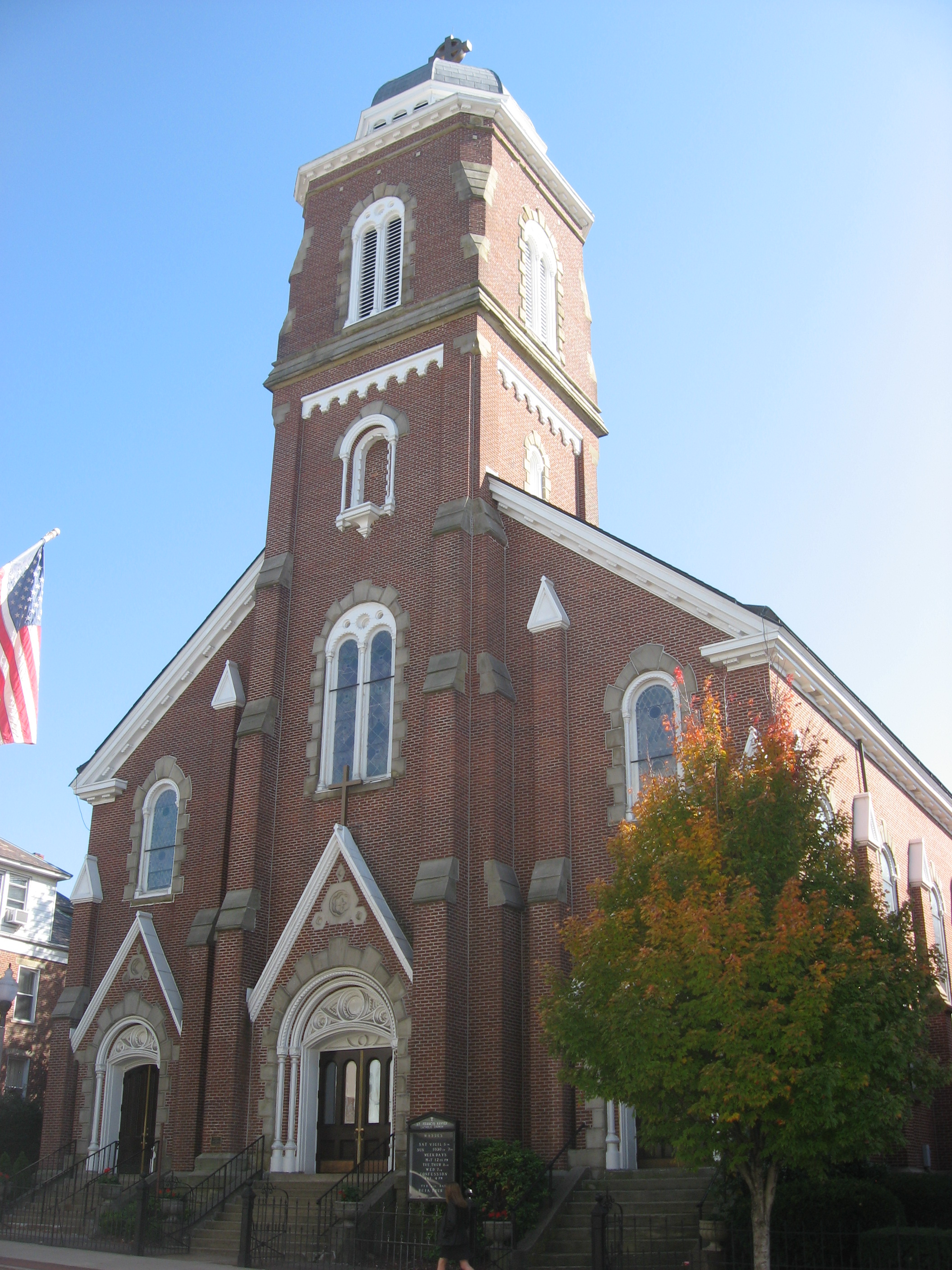
- Front of the church

- Location within West Virginia Location within the United States
- Location: 532 Market St., Parkersburg, West Virginia
- Coordinates: 39°15′57″N 81°33′34″W
- Area: 0.8 acres (0.32 ha)
- Built: 1869
- Architect: Keeley, P.C.
- Architectural style: Gothic, Romanesque
- NRHP reference No.: 78002813
- Added to NRHP: December 22, 1978

St. Francis Xavier Church is a historic church at 532 Market Street in Parkersburg, West Virginia.

This church was built in 1869 and added to the National Register of Historic Places in 1978. St. Francis Xavier is one of the four original churches of the Diocese of Wheeling. St. Xavier is also the oldest church building in Parkersburg. The church was completed and dedicated on October 2, 1870.

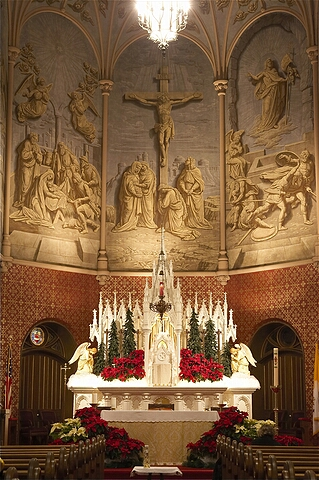
Interior view of St. Francis Xavier Church in Parkersburg, W.V. showing altar and famed murals

== Early Catholic History of Wood County, West Virginia ==
Wood County was originally part of the state of Virginia. The first Catholic family to settle in Wood County was the Joseph family who arrived around 1815. They settled in the southern part of the county near Belleville, some 10 miles south of Parkersburg. They became the nucleus for a small Catholic settlement that developed in this area. The Rev. James Reid of the Diocese of Cincinnati, Ohio, began making missionary visits to this settlement about 1835. On June 4, 1836, Father Reid baptized Henry Joseph and Daniel Wigal. These were the first recorded Catholic baptisms in Wood County.

Richard Vincent Whelan was consecrated Bishop of Richmond, Virginia, on March 21, 1841, and in September 1841 visited with the Catholic families living in Wood County. The bishop was determined to establish a church and to place a priest in residence as soon as it was practical. By this time the Northwest Turnpike (US 50) was completed to Parkersburg, and the Staunton Pike (State Route 47) was nearly complete. The B & O railroad had also begun building a railroad line to Parkersburg. These developments brought an influx of Irish Catholic immigrants who were predominantly employed on these public works to the area. In the U.S. Catholic Directory for the year 1849 Bishop Whelan states: "Parkersburg-a neat brick church is being erected at this point, which many circumstances indicate as likely to become prominent on the Ohio River."

== Construction of the first church ==
On June 1, 1845 Bishop Whelan appointed Father Austin Grogan to minister to the Catholics in Parkersburg and Wood County. On April 28, 1847 Bishop Whelan purchased a lot on Market Street for $306.00, payable in three installments, for the purpose of building Parkersburg's first Catholic Church. Construction on the first church began and the cornerstone was laid on October 27, 1849. A small brick church was built at a cost of $1600.00, with funds provided by the European community through the Propagation of the Faith Society. By April 1850 the church was sufficiently completed and dedicated. Twelve families constituted the charter congregation. Father Robert Lawrence was appointed pastor and took up residence in Parkersburg as its first pastor. On July 19, 1850 the Diocese of Wheeling was created being partitioned from the Diocese of Richmond, Virginia.

== Construction of the present church ==
In 1858 additional lots were purchased on Market Street for a school and rectory. Father Henry Parke, a protégé of Bishop Whelan, was appointed pastor and the parish had 303 members. Seeing education as a means of breaking the cycle of poverty that gripped his parishioners Father Parke opened a school for boys in the parish in 1859. This was followed in 1864 with the establishment of an academy for girls under the direction of the Sisters of the Visitation. In 1859, the parish name was changed from Saint Mary's to St. Francis Xavier. The Civil War soon erupted though and the western counties of Virginia seceded to form the new state of West Virginia on June 20, 1863. At the conclusion of the Civil War Father Parke and the congregation began making plans to build a larger church to replace the original church which had become inadequate to meet the needs of the growing Catholic population. Patrick Charles Keely of New York, a prominent Irish-Catholic architect was selected to design the new St. Francis Xavier. Keely designed an imposing Romanesque revival structure with a bell tower 200 feet in height. Joseph Deris from Wheeling, W.V. was employed as chief carpenter. Actual construction began in August 1867. The pace of construction slowed for an 18-month period due to the difficulty in obtaining quality building materials following the Civil War. On May 9, 1869, the cornerstone was laid for the church and the pace of work quickened with a large force of labor employed on the project. On October 2, 1870, the church was finished and dedicated. The final cost of its construction was $59,930.05.

== Church murals ==
The murals of St. Francis Xavier Church have been called "the most significant examples of ecclesiastical art in West Virginia today" by the West Virginia Department of History and Culture. The murals are noteworthy because of their three-dimensional, bas-relief style also known as tromp l'oeil painting. The artist was Daniel Muller of Munich, Germany who came from New York City. Muller had painted other churches designed by Patrick Keely. Muller's most noted work before St. Francis Xavier was the Church of the Gesu in Montreal, Canada another Keely designed church. Today St. Francis Xavier parish has over 375 families and a parish population of over 1000 persons. St. Monica parish in nearby Lubeck, composed of 42 families, shares staff with St. Xavier. The parish supports two Catholic schools. Parkersburg Catholic Elementary School serves pre-school through grade 5. Parkersburg Catholic High School serves students in grades 6 through 12. Father John Rice is the current pastor of the parish.

== See also ==
- National Register of Historic Places listings in Wood County, West Virginia
