= Dr. W. W. Monroe House =

Historic house in West Virginia, United States

- U.S. National Register of Historic Places
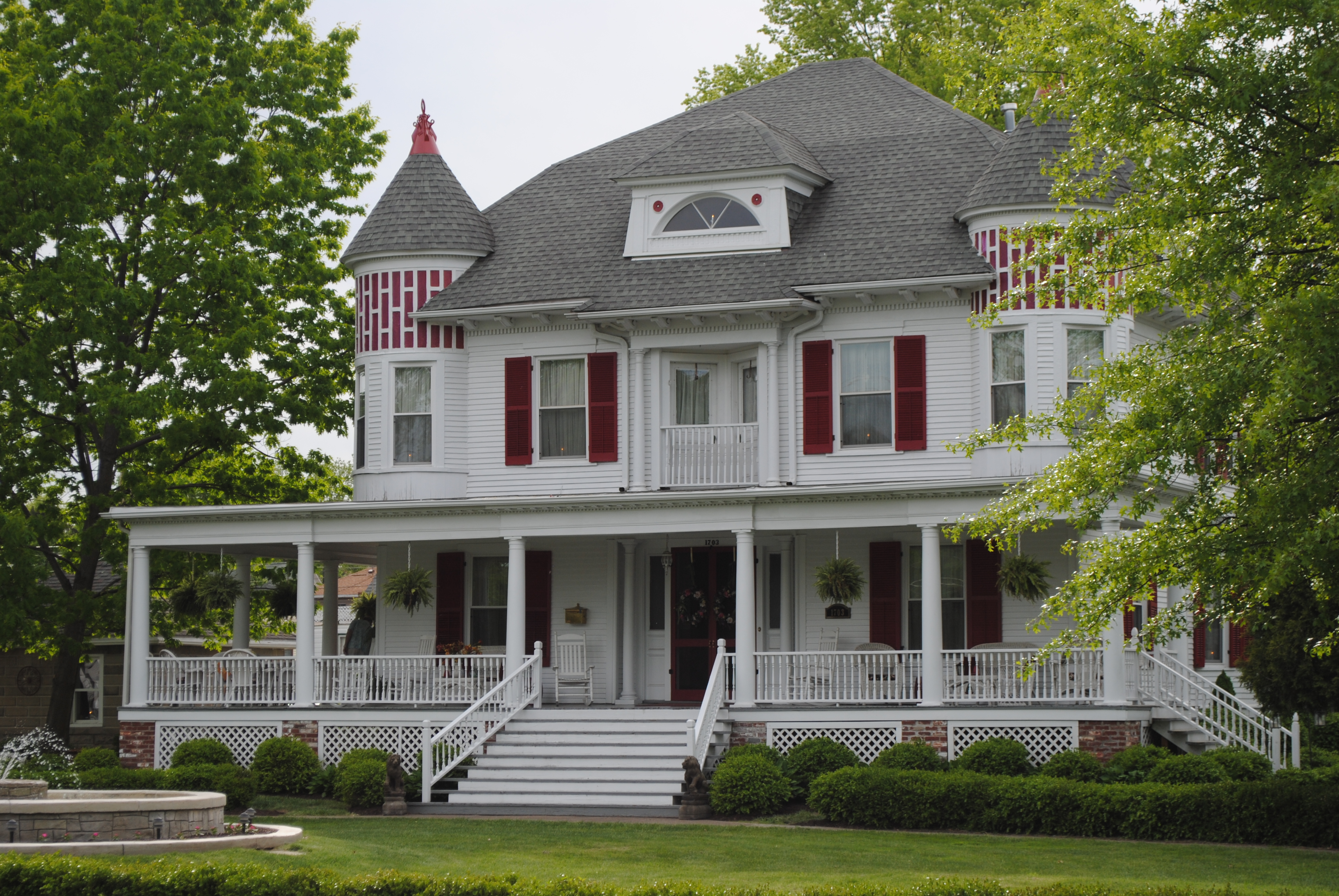
- Dr. W. W. Monroe House, May 2013

- Location within West Virginia Location within the United States
- Location: 1703 Park Ave., Parkersburg, West Virginia
- Coordinates: 39°16′10″N 81°31′58″W
- Area: Less than one acre
- Built: 1898
- Architect: Warne, H. Rus
- Architectural style: Queen Anne
- NRHP reference No.: 12000469
- Added to NRHP: August 1, 2012

Dr. W. W. Monroe House is a historic home located at Parkersburg, Wood County, West Virginia. It was built in 1898, and is a 2 1/2-story, frame dwelling on a sandstone foundation and clad in weatherboard. The house features a large wrap-around porch, two corner turrets, a hipped roof with dormers, decorative brackets, and dentils characteristic of the Queen Anne style. It was designed by noted Charleston, West Virginia architect H. Rus Warne (1872–1954).

It was listed on the National Register of Historic Places in 2012.

== See also ==
- National Register of Historic Places listings in Wood County, West Virginia
