= Gould House (Parkersburg, West Virginia) =

Historic house in West Virginia, United States

- Gould House/Greater Parkersburg Chamber of Commerce
- U.S. National Register of Historic Places
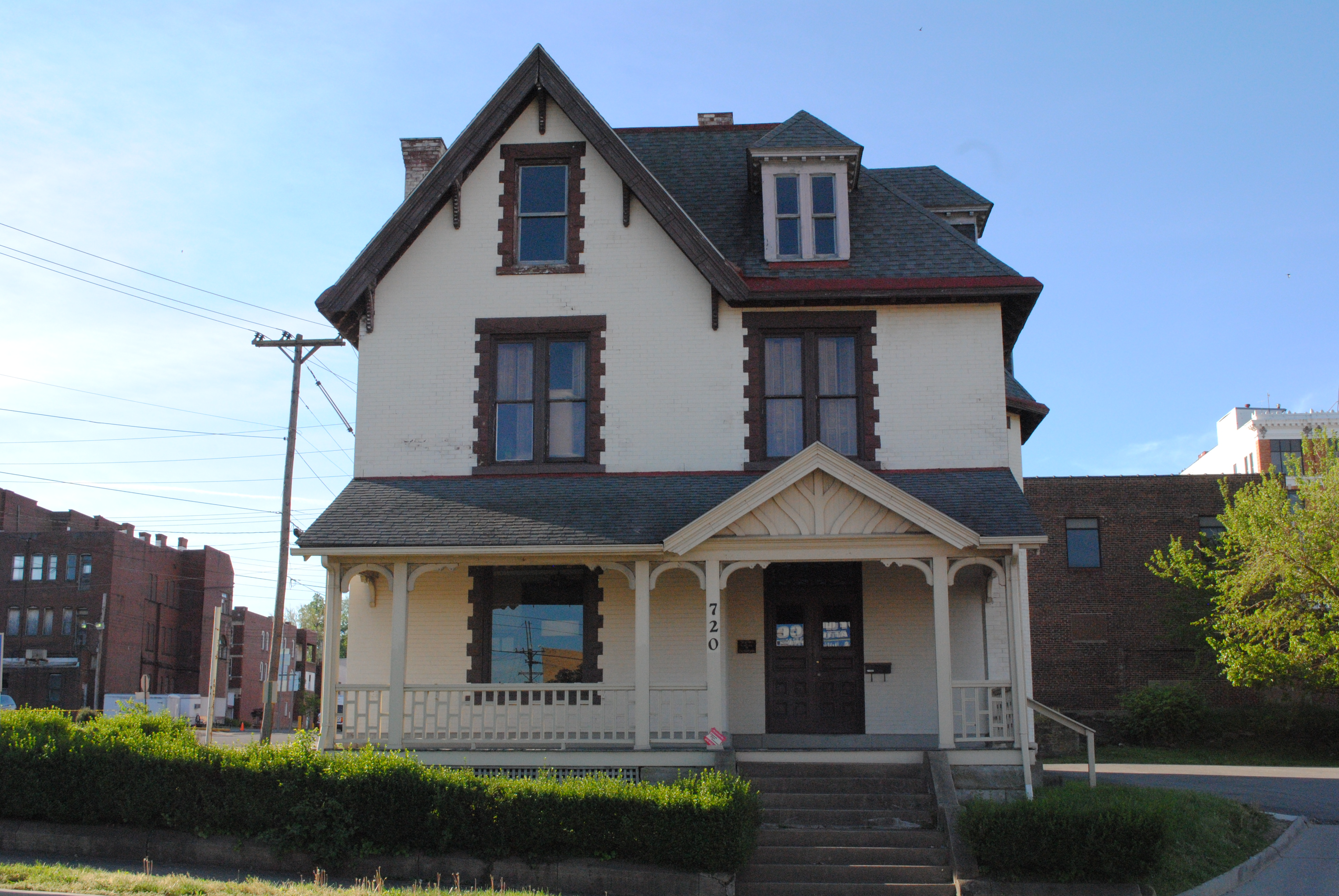

- Location within West Virginia Location within the United States
- Location: 720 Juliana St., Parkersburg, West Virginia
- Coordinates: 39°16′5″N 81°33′29″W
- Area: less than one acre
- Built: 1888
- Architectural style: Late Victorian
- MPS: Downtown Parkersburg MRA
- NRHP reference No.: 82001776
- Added to NRHP: October 8, 1982

Gould House, also known as the Greater Parkersburg Chamber of Commerce, is a historic home located at Parkersburg, Wood County, West Virginia. It was built in 1888, and is a 2 1/2-story brick dwelling in an eclectic Late Victorian style. It consists of a central hipped block with projecting and intersecting gables and a hip roofed wing to the rear. It has housed the Chamber of Commerce since 1968.

It was listed on the National Register of Historic Places in 1982.

== See also ==
- National Register of Historic Places listings in Wood County, West Virginia
