= Henry Cooper House =

Historic house in West Virginia, United States

- U.S. National Register of Historic Places
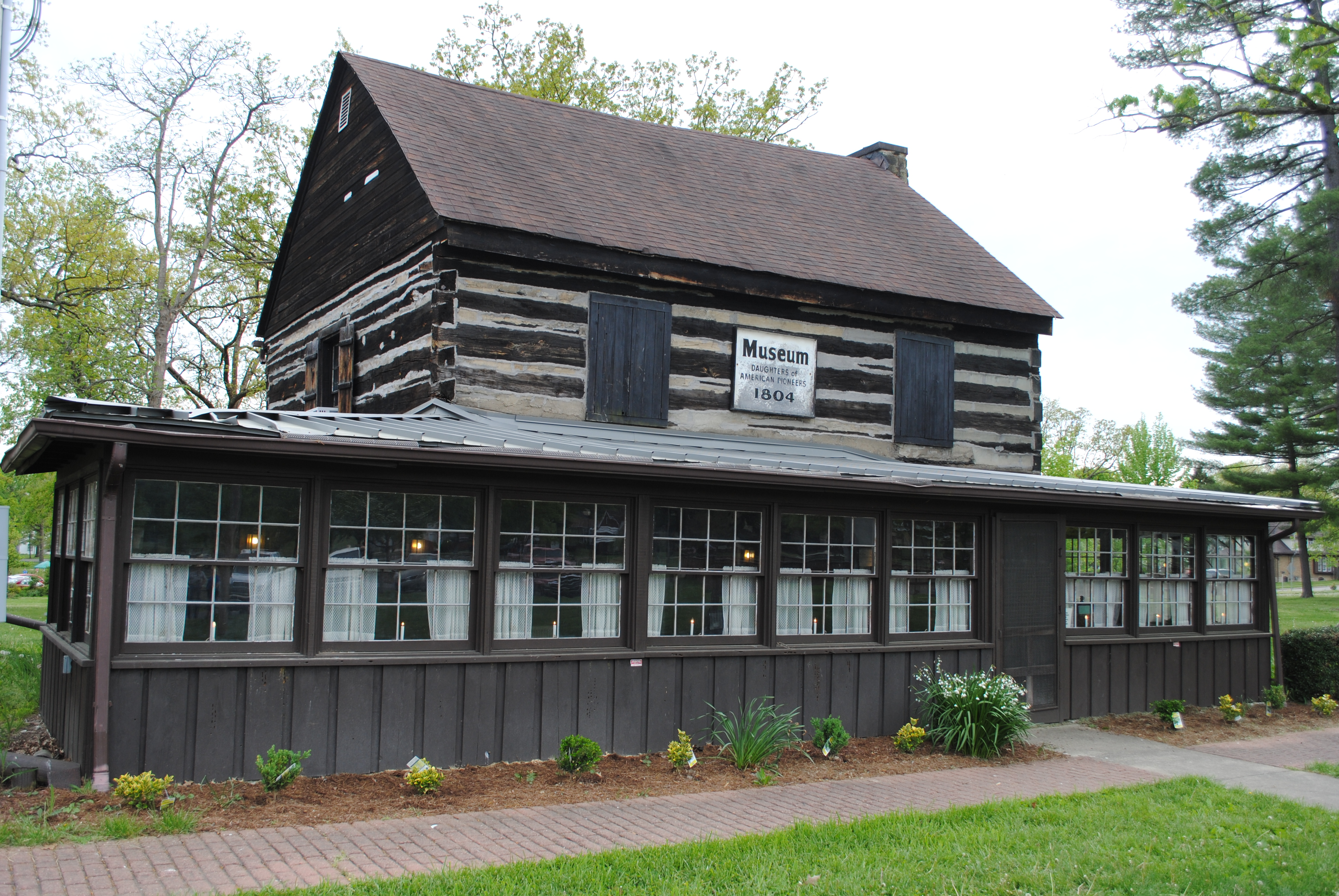

- Location within West Virginia Location within the United States
- Location: Park Ave., Parkersburg, West Virginia
- Coordinates: 39°16′18″N 81°31′48″W
- Area: 1 acre (0.40 ha)
- Built: 1804, 1910
- Built by: Henry Cooper
- Architectural style: Log Cabin
- NRHP reference No.: 86000828
- Added to NRHP: February 6, 1986

Henry Cooper House, also known as The Daughters of American Pioneers Museum and Cooper Cabin, is a historic home located at Parkersburg, Wood County, West Virginia. The log cabin was erected in Slate District, Wood County, in 1804, by Henry Cooper, and is believed to be the first two-story log cabin in Wood County. In August 1910, the City of Parkersburg purchased the structure for $400. After being dismantled, the house was rebuilt in the Park in September 1910. In 1911, title was granted by the City Council to the Centennial Chapter - Daughters of American Pioneers. The cabin is open as a museum.

It was listed on the National Register of Historic Places in 1986.

== See also ==
- National Register of Historic Places listings in Wood County, West Virginia
