= Citizens National Bank (Parkersburg, West Virginia) =

- U.S. National Register of Historic Places
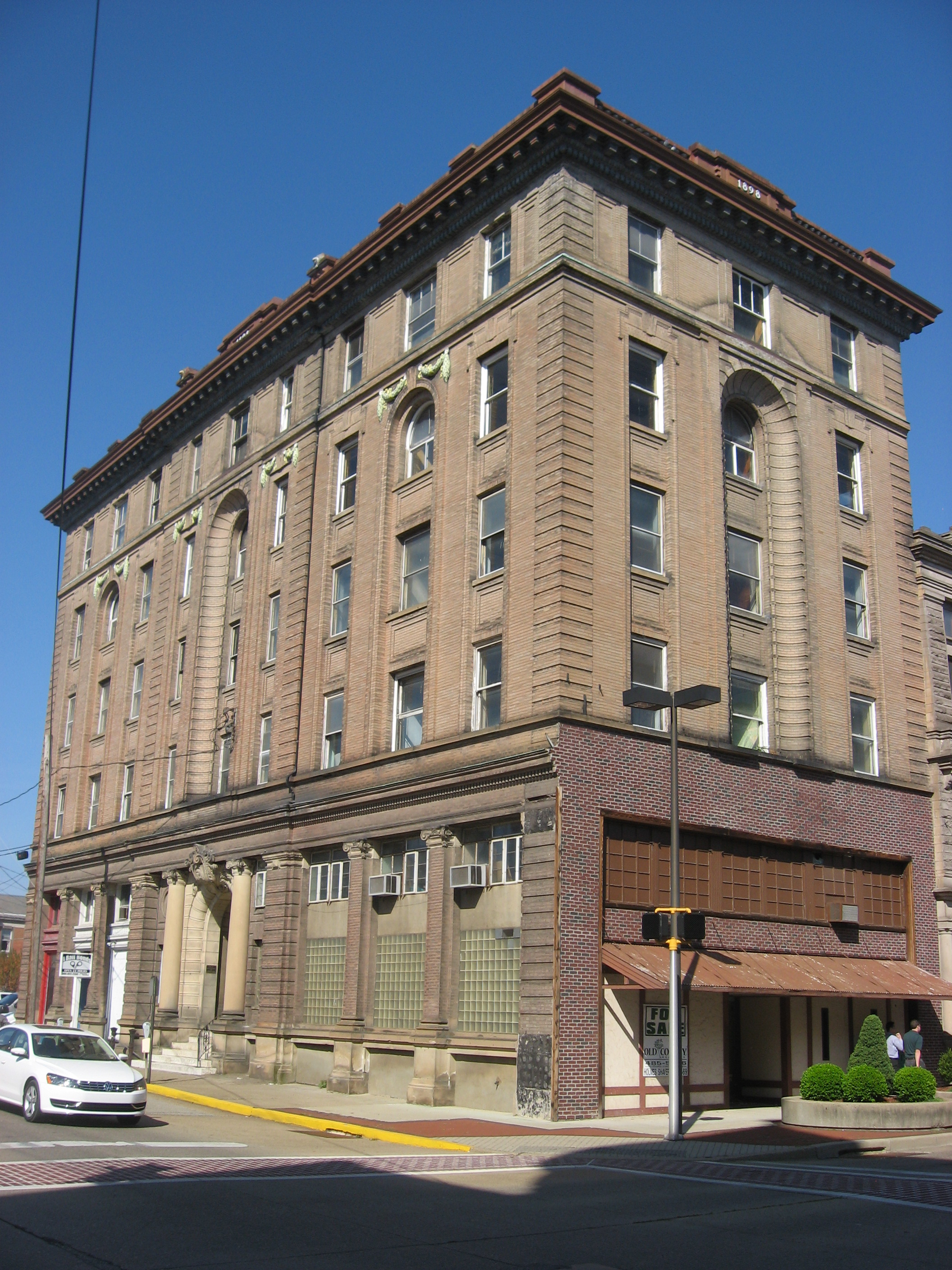
- Front and side of the bank

- Location within West Virginia Location within the United States
- Location: 219 4th St., Parkersburg, West Virginia
- Coordinates: 39°15′55″N 81°33′41″W
- Area: less than one acre
- Built: 1898
- Architectural style: Classical Revival
- Demolished: 2018
- MPS: Downtown Parkersburg MRA
- NRHP reference No.: 82001772
- Added to NRHP: October 8, 1982

Citizens National Bank was a historic bank building located at Parkersburg, Wood County, West Virginia. It was built in 1898, and was a five-story, nine bay by three bay, masonry building in the Classical style. It featured a combination of arches, applied pressed metal ornamentation, and during its latter years, in the shadows of missing hollow metal, broken pediments.

It was listed on the National Register of Historic Places in 1982. The historic structure was demolished on June 23, 2018.

== See also ==
- National Register of Historic Places listings in Wood County, West Virginia
