= Cook House (Parkersburg, West Virginia) =

Historic house in West Virginia, United States

- U.S. National Register of Historic Places
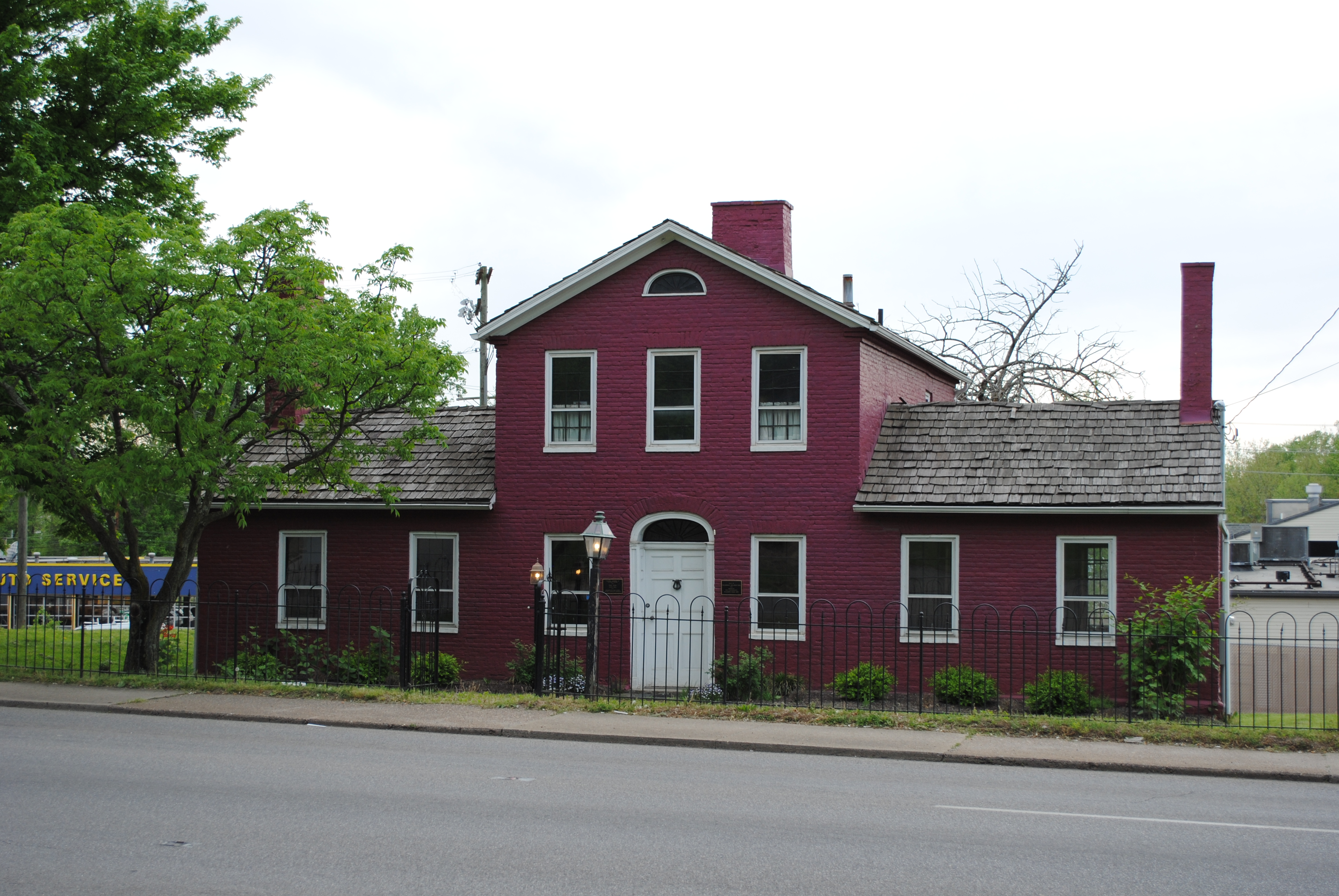

- Location within West Virginia Location within the United States
- Location: 1301 Murdoch Ave., Parkersburg, West Virginia
- Coordinates: 39°16′29″N 81°33′20″W
- Area: 0.5 acres (0.20 ha)
- Built: 1825
- Architectural style: Federal
- NRHP reference No.: 78002812
- Added to NRHP: June 7, 1978

Cook House is a historic home located at Parkersburg, Wood County, West Virginia. It was built in 1825, and consists of a center section with two flanking wings in the Federal style. It is in a T-shaped plan, is built of red brick, and has a gable roof.

It was listed on the National Register of Historic Places in 1978.

== See also ==
- National Register of Historic Places listings in Wood County, West Virginia
