= Isaac F. Lane House =

Historic house in West Virginia, United States

- U.S. National Register of Historic Places
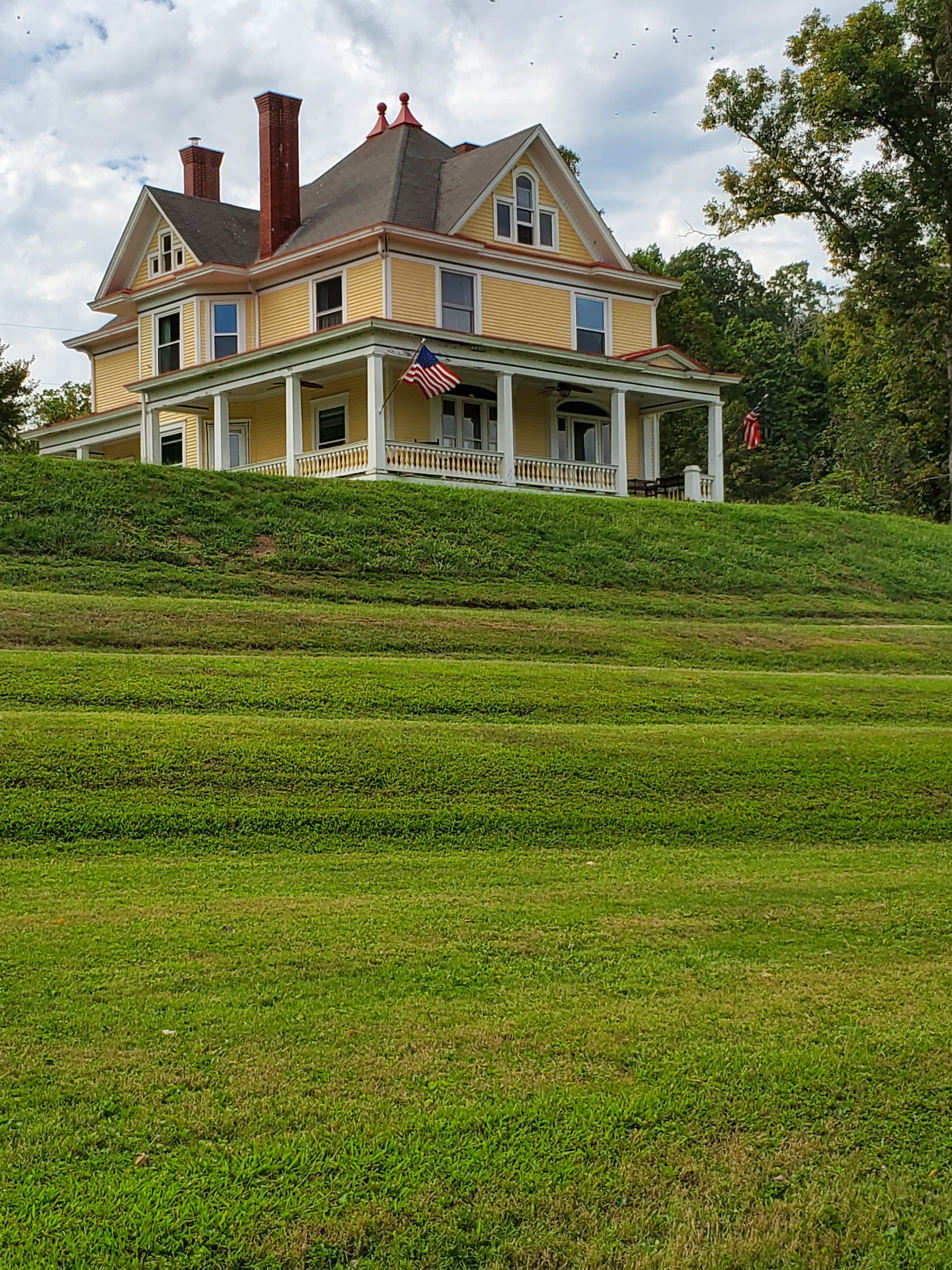
- Isaac F. Lane House in 2019.

- Location within West Virginia Location within the United States
- Location: 1399 Waverly Rd., Williamstown, West Virginia
- Coordinates: 39°21′27″N 81°24′18″W
- Area: 0.5 acres (0.20 ha)
- Built: 1863
- Architectural style: Victorian
- NRHP reference No.: 100003252
- Added to NRHP: June 26, 2019

Isaac F. Lane House is a historic home located at Parkersburg, Wood County, West Virginia. It was built in 1863, and consists of a Brick/Concrete Block exterior with Victorian style architecture.

It was listed on the National Register of Historic Places in 2019.

== See also ==
- National Register of Historic Places listings in Wood County, West Virginia
