= Henry Logan Memorial AME Church =

Historic church in West Virginia, United States

- U.S. National Register of Historic Places
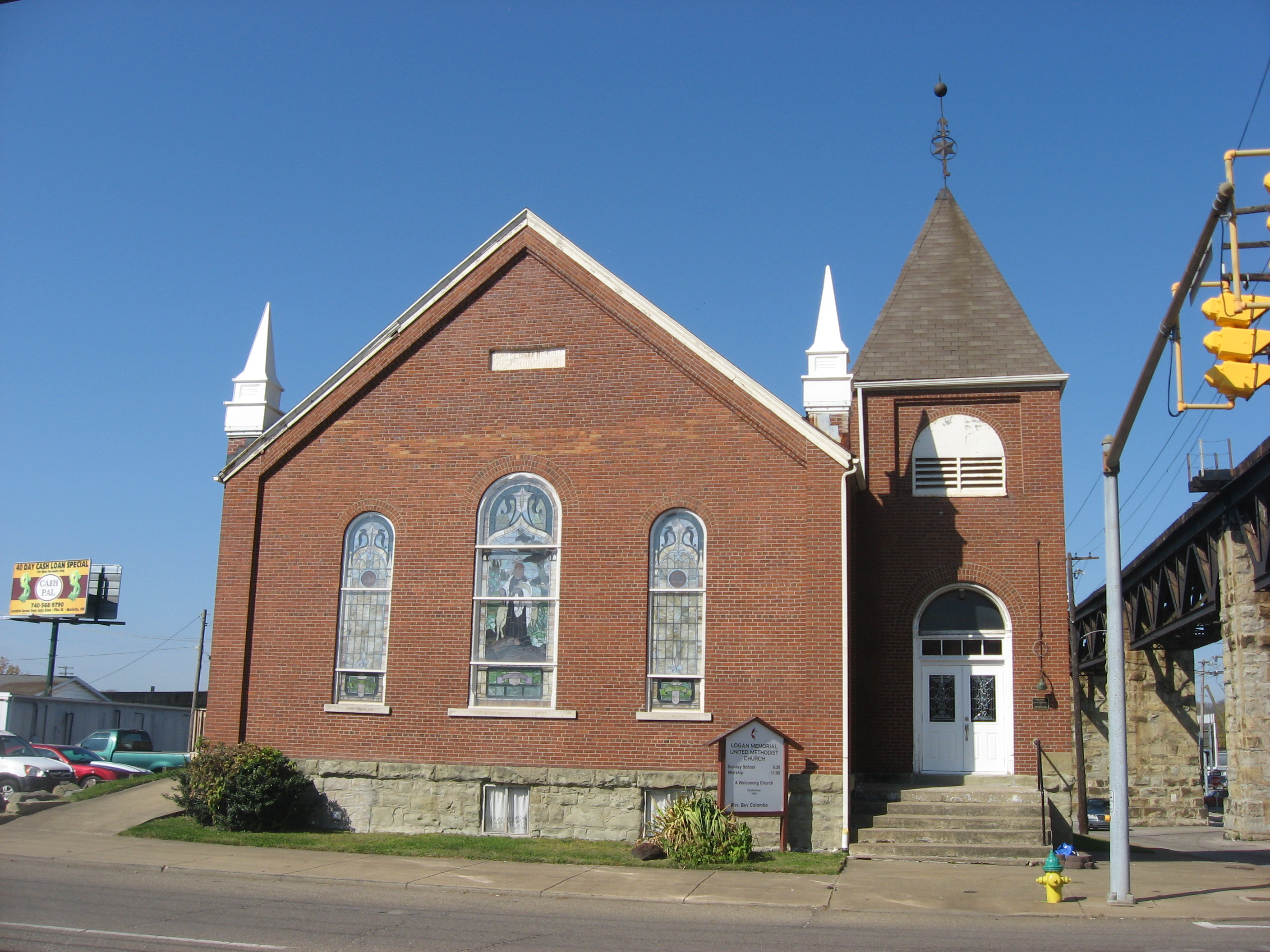
- Front of the church

- Location within West Virginia Location within the United States
- Location: Ann & 6th Sts., Parkersburg, West Virginia
- Coordinates: 39°16′5″N 81°33′41″W
- Area: 0.2 acres (0.081 ha)
- Built: 1891
- Architectural style: Vernacular Romanesque
- MPS: Downtown Parkersburg MRA
- NRHP reference No.: 82001778
- Added to NRHP: December 16, 1982

Henry Logan Memorial African Methodist Episcopal Church is a historic African Methodist Episcopal church at Ann & 6th Streets in Parkersburg, Wood County, West Virginia. It was built in 1891, and is a brick and stone church building in a vernacular Romanesque style. It features three round arched stained glass windows on the front facade and a square, pyramidal roofed corner tower.

It was listed on the National Register of Historic Places in 1982.

== See also ==
- National Register of Historic Places listings in Wood County, West Virginia
