= Elks Club (Parkersburg, West Virginia) =

- U.S. National Register of Historic Places
- Location within West Virginia Location within the United States
- Location: 515 Juliana St., Parkersburg, West Virginia
- Coordinates: 39°16′2″N 81°33′39″W
- Area: less than one acre
- Built: 1903
- Architect: Patton, William Howe
- Architectural style: Classical Revival
- MPS: Downtown Parkersburg MRA
- NRHP reference No.: 82001773
- Added to NRHP: October 8, 1982

The Elks Club was a historic clubhouse building located at Parkersburg, Wood County, West Virginia. It was designed by architect William Howe Patton and built in 1903. It was a four-story, three-bay by six-bay wide, red brick building with terra cotta trim in the Classical Revival style. The first two stories were faced in smooth dressed stone, and feature arched apertures, with central consoles. It was occupied by the Parkersburg Lodge #198, Benevolent and Protective Order of Elks (B.P.O.E.)

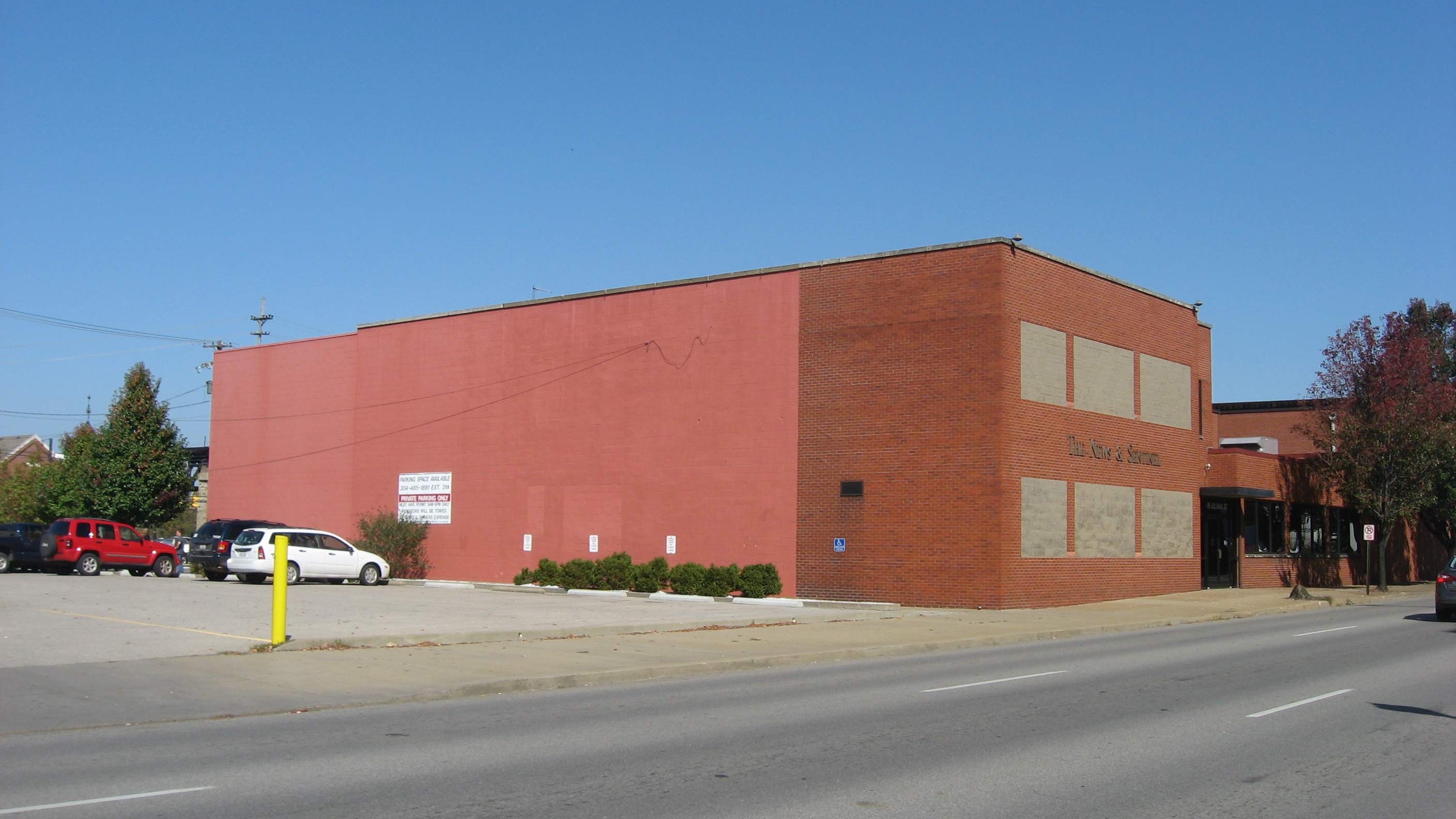
Site of the now-destroyed building, now occupied by The Parkersburg News and Sentinel

It was listed on the National Register of Historic Places in 1982. The building was by the Parkersburg News & Sentinel and demolished in 2005. It is now used as a parking lot.

== See also ==
- National Register of Historic Places listings in Wood County, West Virginia
