= Case House (Parkersburg, West Virginia) =

Historic house in West Virginia, United States

- U.S. National Register of Historic Places
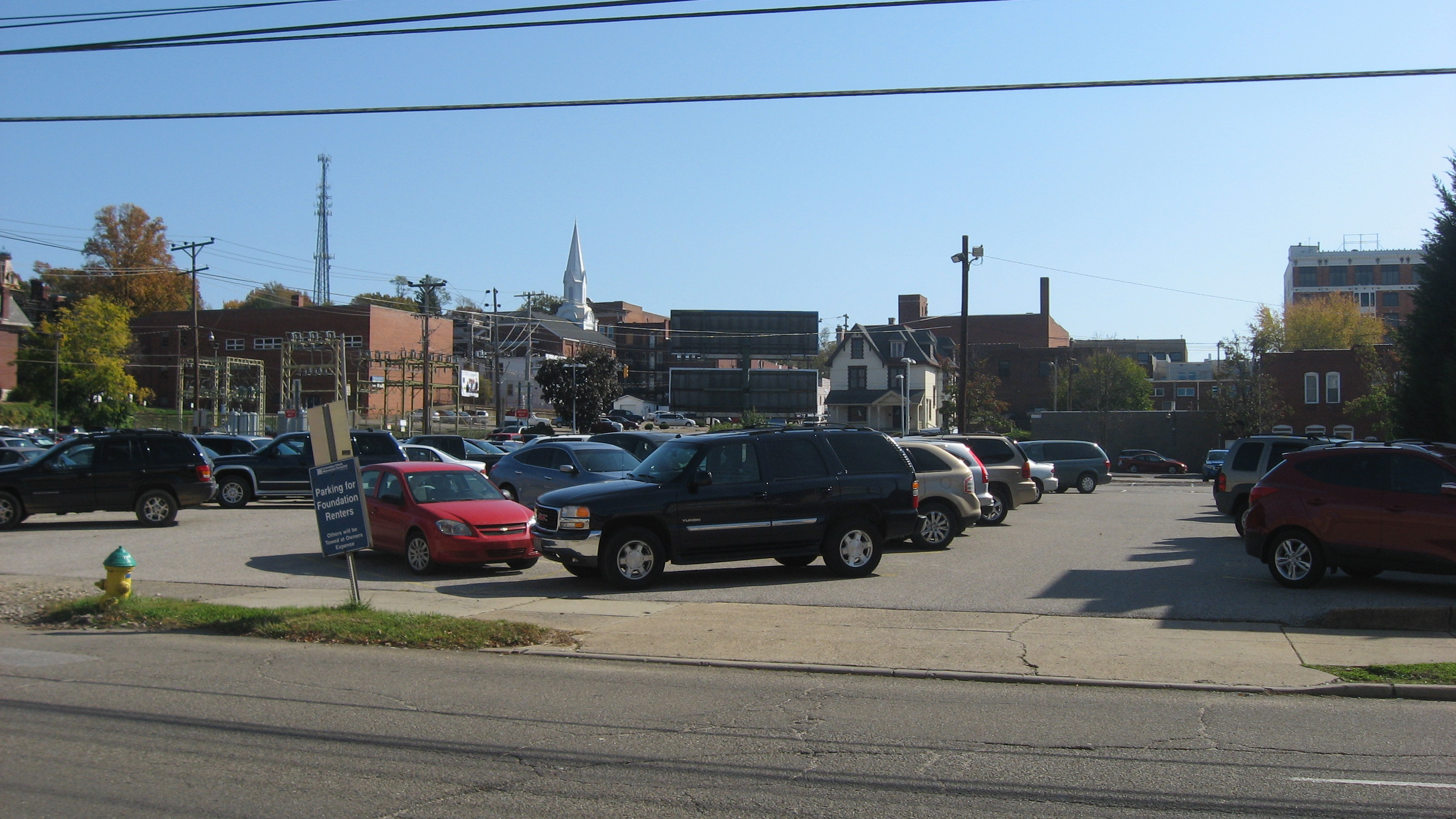
- Former site of the house, in 2012

- Location within West Virginia Location within the United States
- Location: 710 Ann St., Parkersburg, West Virginia
- Coordinates: 39°16′8″N 81°33′32″W
- Area: less than one acre
- Built: 1901
- Architectural style: Queen Anne
- MPS: Downtown Parkersburg MRA
- NRHP reference No.: 82001770
- Added to NRHP: October 8, 1982

Case House was a historic home located at Parkersburg, Wood County, West Virginia, United States. It was built about 1901, and was a 2½-story brick dwelling in the Queen Anne style. It features a three-story, polygonal corner tower and a multigabled roof.

It was listed on the National Register of Historic Places in 1982. It has since been demolished or moved.

== See also ==
- National Register of Historic Places listings in Wood County, West Virginia
