= Walton Wait House =

Historic house in West Virginia, United States

- U.S. National Register of Historic Places
- Location within West Virginia Location within the United States
- Location: 1232 Murdoch Ave., Parkersburg, West Virginia
- Coordinates: 39°16′27″N 81°33′19″W
- Area: 0.1 acres (0.040 ha)
- Architectural style: Greek Revival, Italianate
- MPS: Downtown Parkersburg MRA
- NRHP reference No.: 82001793
- Added to NRHP: December 10, 1982

Walton Wait House was a historic home located at Parkersburg, Wood County, West Virginia. It was built between about 1860 and 1870, and is a two-story, frame house in a transitional Greek Revival / Italianate style. It has a gable roof with an intersecting side gable. It was moved to its present location about 1924, with the former front facade now oriented to the rear.

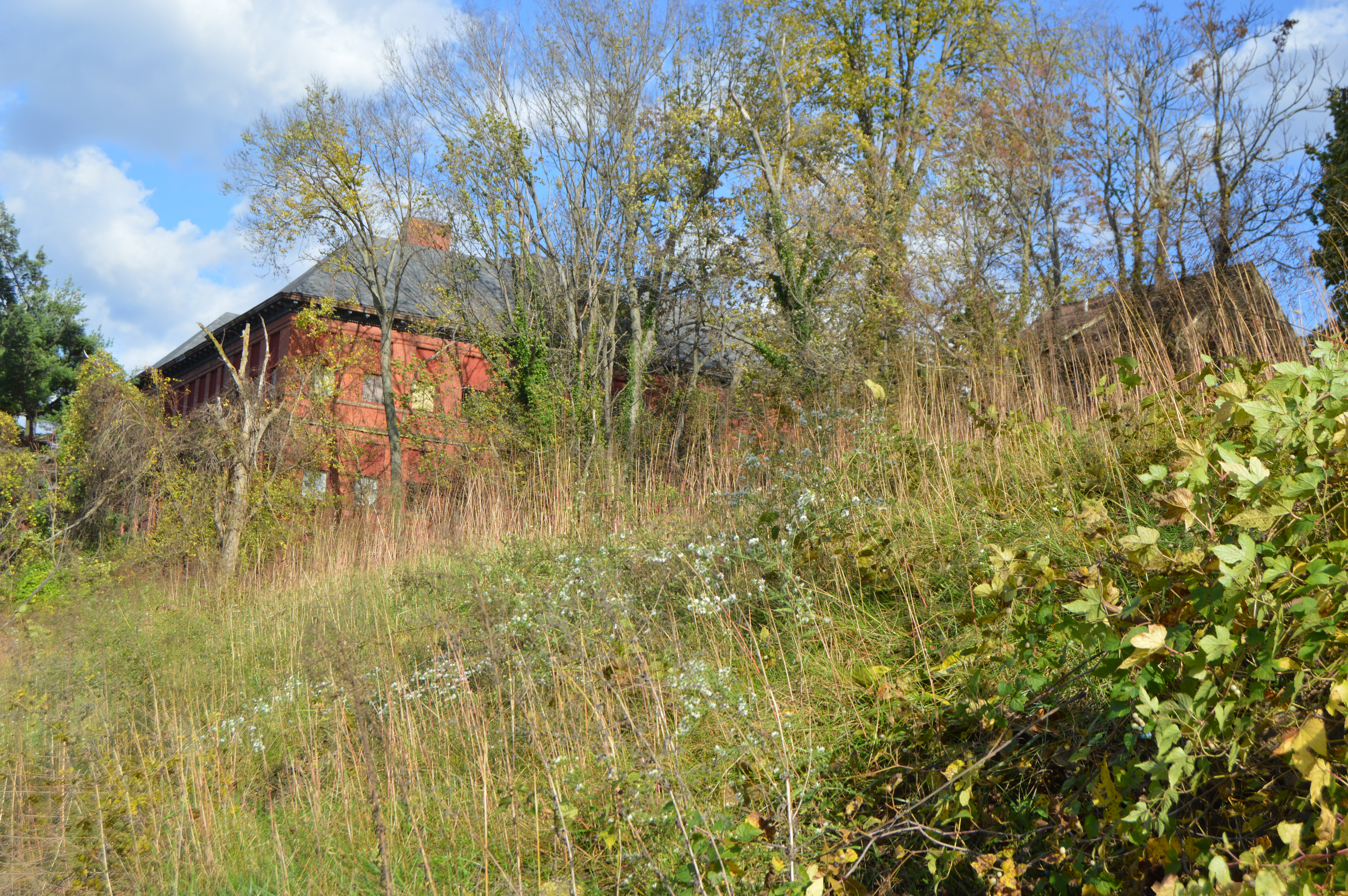
Photo in 2015 of former site of the house

It was listed on the National Register of Historic Places in 1982.

== See also ==
- National Register of Historic Places listings in Wood County, West Virginia
