= Fort Boreman =

United States historic place in West Virginia

- U.S. National Register of Historic Places
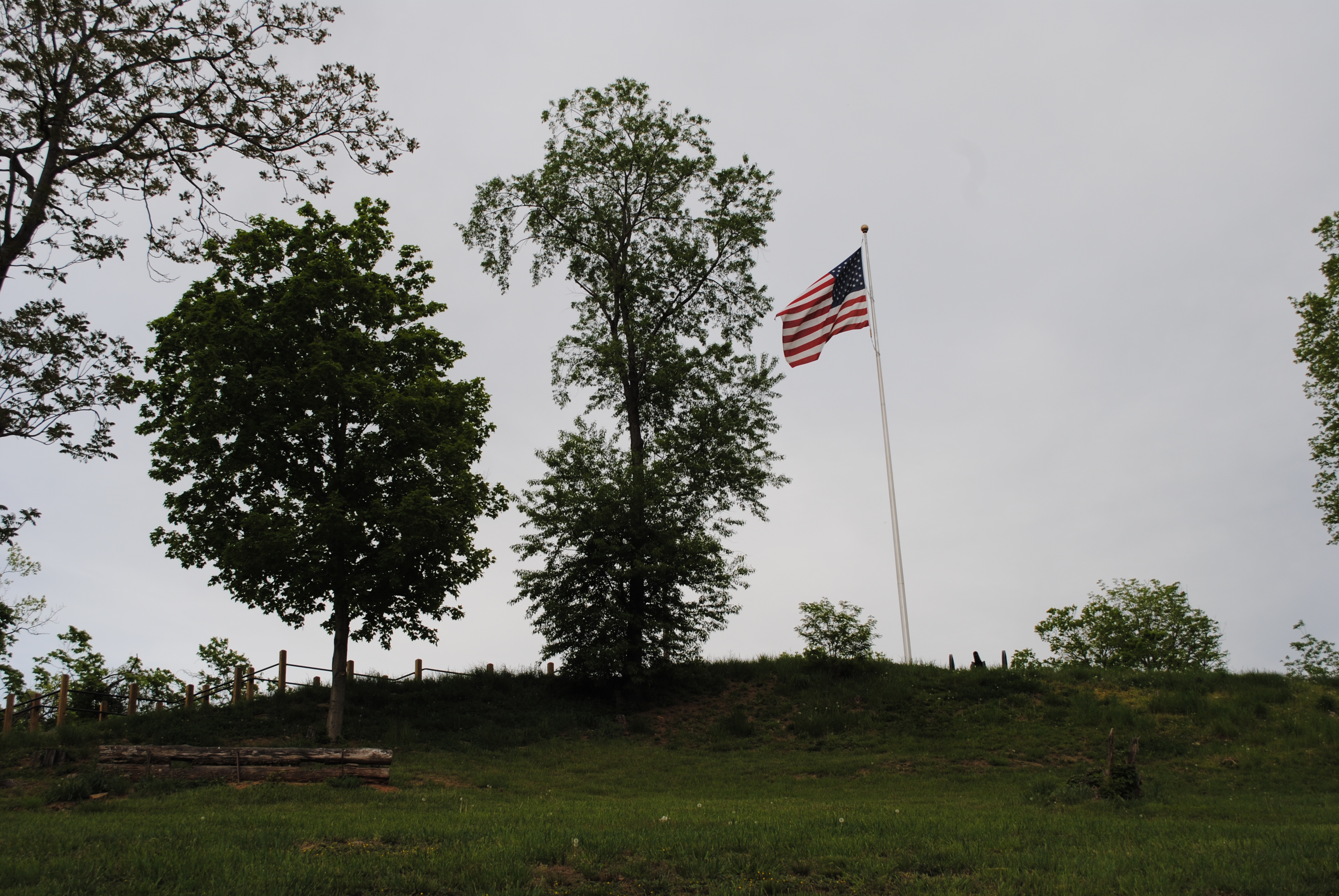
- A view of the hill that makes up the former Fort Boreman

- Location within West Virginia Location within the United States
- Location: Fort Boreman Drive, Parkersburg, West Virginia
- Coordinates: 39°15′41″N 81°34′6″W
- Area: 12 acres (4.9 ha)
- Built: 1863
- Built by: Co. A, 11th West Virginia Volunteer Infantry Regiment
- NRHP reference No.: 02001690
- Added to NRHP: April 17, 2003

Fort Boreman is a historic archaeological site encompassing a Civil War fortification located near Parkersburg, Wood County, West Virginia. It was built in 1863, by Company A of the 11th West Virginia Volunteer Infantry Regiment. It is a series of paired, approximately four foot deep trenches encircling the top of the hill in a zigzag pattern. It was originally built to ensure that the Baltimore and Ohio Railroad link between Wheeling and Parkersburg was not severed or commandeered by the Confederate army. The fort was named after Arthur I. Boreman, West Virginia's first Governor.

It was listed on the National Register of Historic Places in 2002.

== See also ==
- National Register of Historic Places listings in Wood County, West Virginia
