= Neal House =

Neal House may refer to:

- Noel Owen Neal House, Nashville, Arkansas, listed on the NRHP in Howard County, Arkansas
- W. Scott Neal House, Boise, Idaho, listed on the NRHP in Ada County, Idaho
- Halbert F. and Grace Neal House, Meridian, Idaho, listed on the NRHP in Ada County, Idaho
- Jairus Neal House, Newton, Kansas, listed on the NRHP in Harvey County, Kansas
- Neal-Hamblen House, Chestnut Grove, Kentucky, listed on the NRHP in Shelby County, Kentucky
- Neal House (Milton, Kentucky), listed on the National Register of Historic Places in Trimble County, Kentucky
- Priest Neal's Mass House and Mill Site, Bel Air, Maryland, listed on the NRHP in Harford County, Maryland
- James Neal House, Portsmouth, New Hampshire, listed on the NRHP in Rockingham County, New Hampshire
- Neill Log House, Pittsburgh, Pennsylvania, also spelled "Neal", listed on the NRHP in Allegheny County, Pennsylvania
- Neal House (Ennis, Texas), listed on the National Register of Historic Places in Ellis County, Texas

== See also ==
- Neale House (disambiguation)
- O'Neal House (disambiguation)
