= Dick Hoblitzell =

American baseball player (1888–1962)

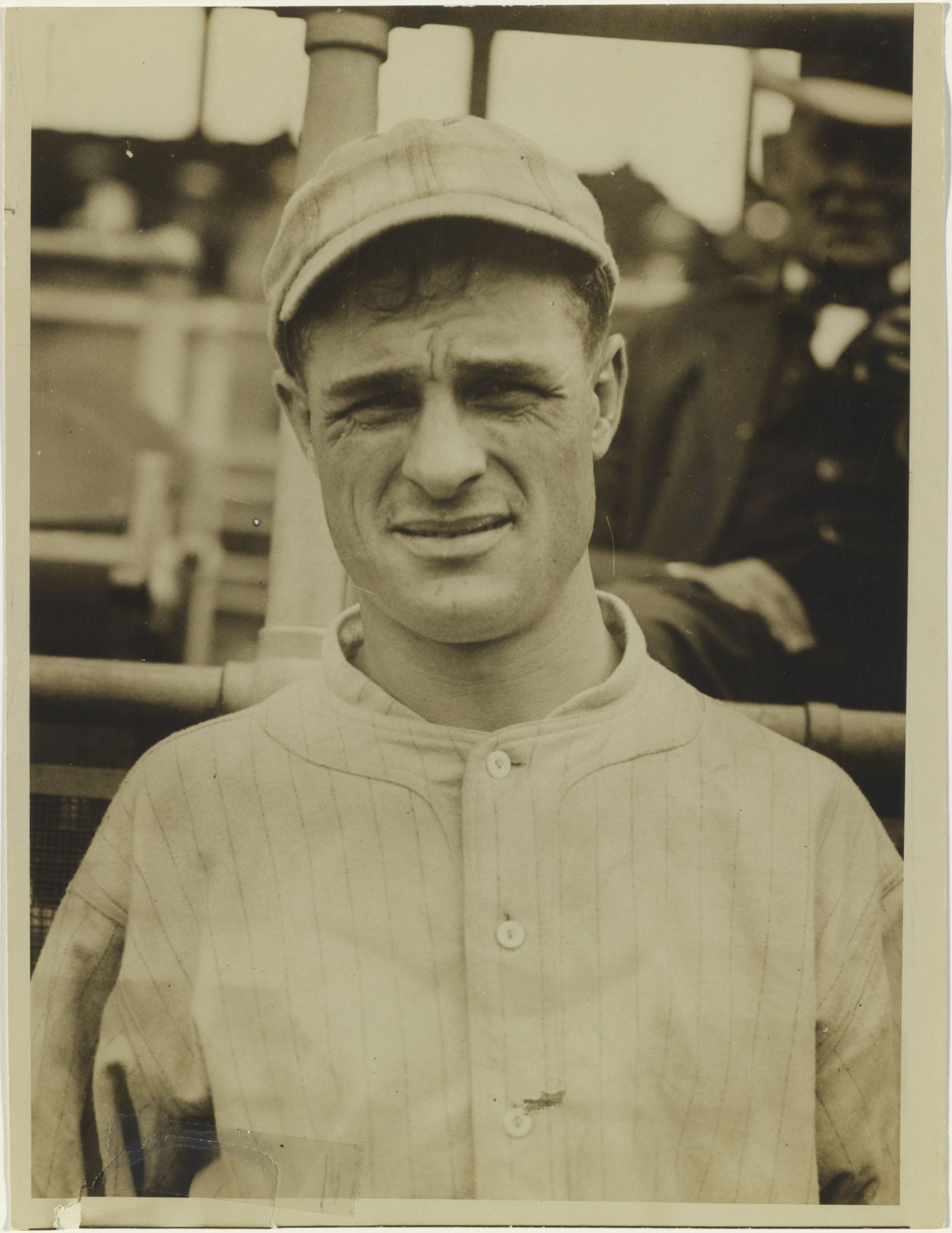
- First baseman
- Born: October 26, 1888; Waverly, West Virginia, U.S.
- Died: November 14, 1962 (aged 74); Parkersburg, West Virginia, U.S.
- Batted: Left Threw: Right

MLB debut
- September 5, 1908, for the Cincinnati Reds

Last MLB appearance
- June 7, 1918, for the Boston Red Sox

MLB statistics
- Batting average: .278
- Home runs: 27
- Runs batted in: 593
- Stats at Baseball Reference

Teams
- Cincinnati Reds (1908–1914); Boston Red Sox (1914–1918)

Career highlights and awards
- 2× World Series champion (1915, 1916)

Richard Carleton Hoblitzell (October 26, 1888 – November 14, 1962) was an American professional baseball player who played first base in the major leagues from 1908 to 1918. He played for the Cincinnati Reds and Boston Red Sox. Nicknamed "Doc" by his teammates, Hoblitzell's baseball career was cut short with his World War I induction into the U.S. Army as a dentist in 1918.

== Early life ==
Born in Waverly, West Virginia, Hoblitzell excelled in football at Parkersburg High School in Parkersburg, West Virginia; he was the team's halfback and kicker. He played minor-league baseball at the age of 16, taking an assumed name so that he would not lose his collegiate eligibility. He played football at Marietta College and the University of Pittsburgh. He played football in the days preceding professional football, so he decided to pursue a career in baseball. He later became the first Pitt alumnus to enter major-league baseball.

== Baseball career ==
Hoblitzell signed with the Cincinnati Reds in 1908, playing with the team through 1914 and studying dentistry in the offseasons. He was the National League at-bats leader in 1910 and 1911 and Cincinnati's Most Valuable Player in 1911. In the middle of the 1914 season, he was waived by the Reds and claimed by the Boston Red Sox. With Boston, Hoblitzell won two consecutive World Series (1915 and 1916). Hoblitzell was often assigned to room with Babe Ruth when the team traveled, as the team's management hoped that Hoblitzell would be a good influence on the rowdy superstar.

Hoblitzell's baseball career was interrupted by his induction into the U.S. Army Dental Corps in 1918, and he never returned to the major leagues. He finished his career with 1,318 games played, 1,310 hits, 27 home runs, 593 RBIs and a .278 batting average.

== Later life ==
After his military service, Hoblitzell was a manager in minor-league baseball. In 1929 and 1930, he spent two years managing the Charlotte Hornets team in the South Atlantic League. Though he liked Charlotte, he ended up managing a minor-league team in Charleston in 1931. Hoblitzell had distant relatives in Charleston, including future politician John D. Hoblitzell Jr., and he fell in love with the state of West Virginia. After that season, Hoblitzell moved to a 540-acre farm in Wood County, West Virginia. He began umpiring minor-league baseball in the 1930s, assigned to the Class AAA International League.

Hoblitzell became the county commissioner for Wood County in 1942, and he served for six years. In 1952, he began a four-year stint as the county sheriff. He also worked in real estate. At various times, Hoblitzell also coached baseball at West Point and worked in newspaper and radio. Though Hoblitzell did not open a dental practice, he performed some dental work for friends at his home. He died of colon cancer in 1962.
