= Meldahl House =

Historic house in West Virginia, United States

- U.S. National Register of Historic Places
- Location within West Virginia Location within the United States
- Location: Washington Bottom Rd. off WV 892, near Washington, West Virginia
- Coordinates: 39°13′28″N 81°40′57″W
- Area: 2 acres (0.81 ha)
- Built by: Lewis Fankhauser (house); Charlie Behrens (wine cellar)
- Architectural style: American Four Square
- NRHP reference No.: 91000550
- Added to NRHP: May 17, 1991

Meldahl House is a historic home located near Washington, Wood County, West Virginia. The house was built in the 1920s, and is a 2 1/2-story, three bay by three bay, frame American Foursquare style residence. It has a hipped roof and a central stone chimney. Also on the property is a wine cellar constructed about 1860 and a wooden gazebo. The property is associated with the once-flourishing wine and grape industry of Wood County.

It was listed on the National Register of Historic Places in 1991.

== See also ==
- National Register of Historic Places listings in Wood County, West Virginia
