= George Neale Jr. House =

Historic house in West Virginia, United States

- U.S. National Register of Historic Places
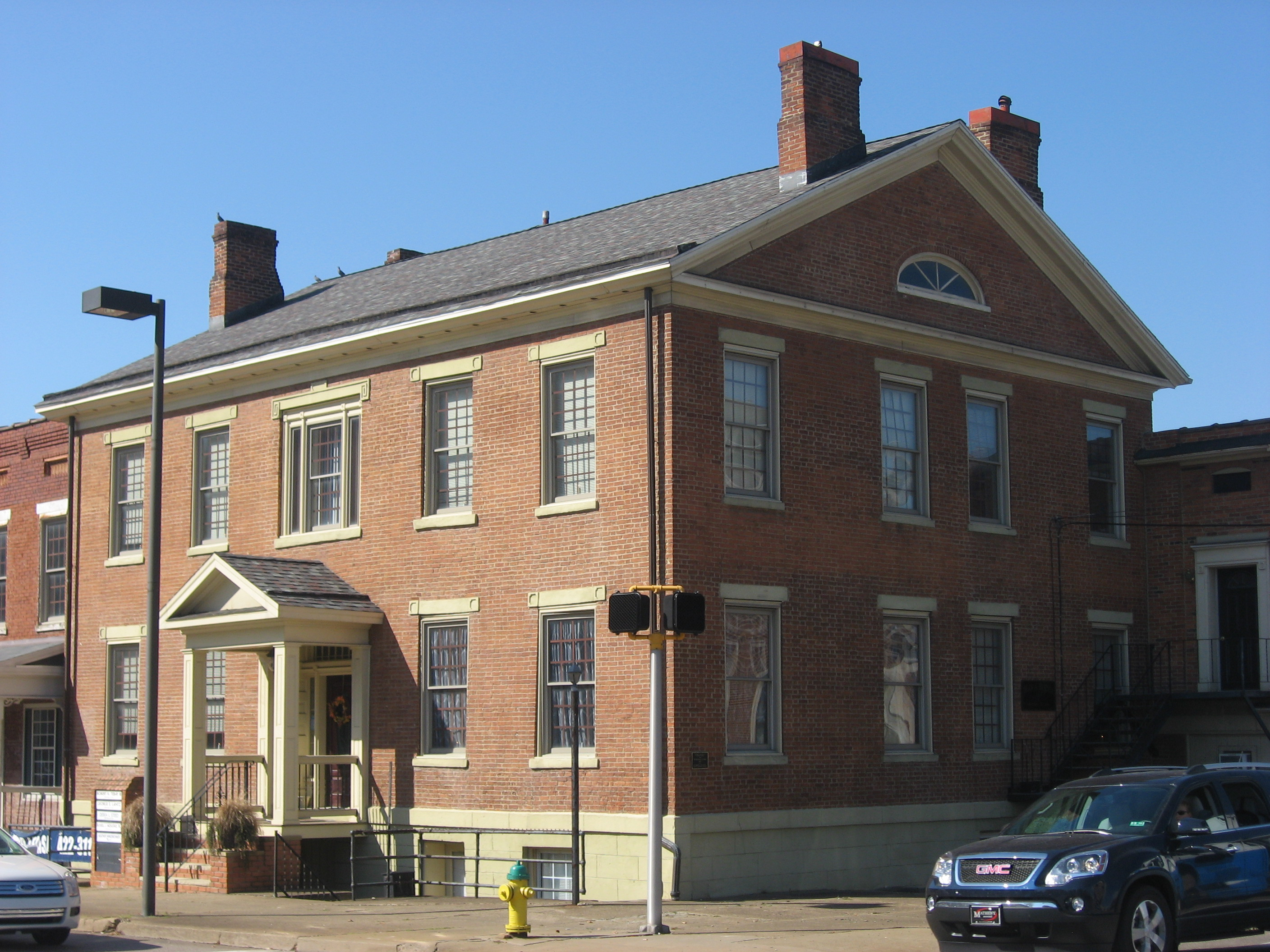
- Front and side of the house

- Location within West Virginia Location within the United States
- Location: 331 Juliana St., Parkersburg, West Virginia
- Coordinates: 39°15′58″N 81°33′46″W
- Area: less than one acre
- Built: 1840
- Architectural style: Greek Revival, Other, Vernacular
- NRHP reference No.: 80004045
- Added to NRHP: January 10, 1980

George Neale Jr. House, also known as the Pence Building, is a historic home located at Parkersburg, Wood County, West Virginia. Built in 1840, it is a two-story structure with a stone foundation and walls of handmade orange-red brick in the Greek Revival style. The house was converted into law and real estate offices in the 1880s. Additions to the original building were built in 1958 and 1973.

George Neale, Jr., had previously had a house built on nearby Blennerhassett Island in 1833. That building, which was also constructed with handmade bricks, is today a ruin.

It was listed on the National Register of Historic Places in 1980.

== See also ==
- National Register of Historic Places listings in Wood County, West Virginia
