= Howard O'Neal Barn =

- U.S. National Register of Historic Places
- Location within Arkansas Location within the United States
- Nearest city: Russell, Arkansas
- Coordinates: 35°21′19″N 91°30′21″W
- Area: less than one acre
- Built by: Otto Roetzel
- Architectural style: Plain traditional
- MPS: White County MPS
- NRHP reference No.: 91001286
- Added to NRHP: July 20, 1992

The Howard O'Neal Barn was a historic barn near Russell, Arkansas. It was located southeast of the city off Roetzel Road. It was a two-story wood-frame structure, with a gambrel roof. In layout it has a transverse crib plan, and was designed to house equipment, farm animals, and feed. Built about 1938, it was a good example of a period barn in White County.

The barn was listed on the National Register of Historic Places in 1992. It has been listed as destroyed in the Arkansas Historic Preservation Program database.

== See also ==
- National Register of Historic Places listings in White County, Arkansas
