= Waverly, West Virginia =

Waverly
- Census-designated place (CDP)
- Location within the state of West Virginia
- Coordinates: 39°19′54″N 81°22′32″W
- Country: United States
- State: West Virginia
- County: Wood

Area
  - Total: 1.482 sq mi (3.84 km^{2})
  - Land: 1.482 sq mi (3.84 km^{2})
  - Water: 0 sq mi (0 km^{2})
- Elevation: 646 ft (197 m)

Population (2020)
  - Total: 369
  - Density: 249/sq mi (96.1/km^{2})
- Time zone: UTC-5 (Eastern (EST))
  - Summer (DST): UTC-4 (EDT)
- ZIP Codes: 26184
- GNIS feature ID: 2586899

Waverly (also known as Bull Creek and Union School District) is a census-designated place (CDP) in northeastern Wood County, West Virginia, United States. As of the 2020 census, its population was 369 (down from 395 at the 2010 census). It lies along the Ohio River on West Virginia Route 2, northeast of the city of Parkersburg, the county seat of Wood County. It has a post office with the ZIP Code 26184.

== School ==
Waverly has had several schools within its boundaries. In order of age, there has been:

- Union School, for which the area was originally named
- Pumpkin Knob school, which was later turned into the community building at the top of Pumpkin Knob road (The building is now abandoned, but used to house 4-H meetings)
- Pine Grove School – This location is still in use as the Pine Grove Baptist Church in Waverly
- Waverly Elementary, which was closed at the end of the 2019–2020 school year following completion of the newly built Williamstown-Waverly elementary in the nearby town of Williamstown.

The closure of Waverly Elementary was met with resistance from some residents.

== Library ==
As a result of the Waverly elementary closing, the Waverly library was also shut down. The land was being used by the library at the discretion of the Wood County Board of Education.

On Friday, May 21, 2021, Brian Raitz of the Wood County library sent out an email letting patrons know that the library's collection would be given away for free. The remaining books were given away on Saturday, May 22.

It has been suggested that the land that both the school and library sit on will be given to the adjacent volunteer fire department, but this information has not yet been released to the public.

== Notable people ==
- Dick Hoblitzell, former MLB first basemen

== See also ==
- List of cities and towns along the Ohio River
