= Broad Street Apartments =

- U.S. National Register of Historic Places
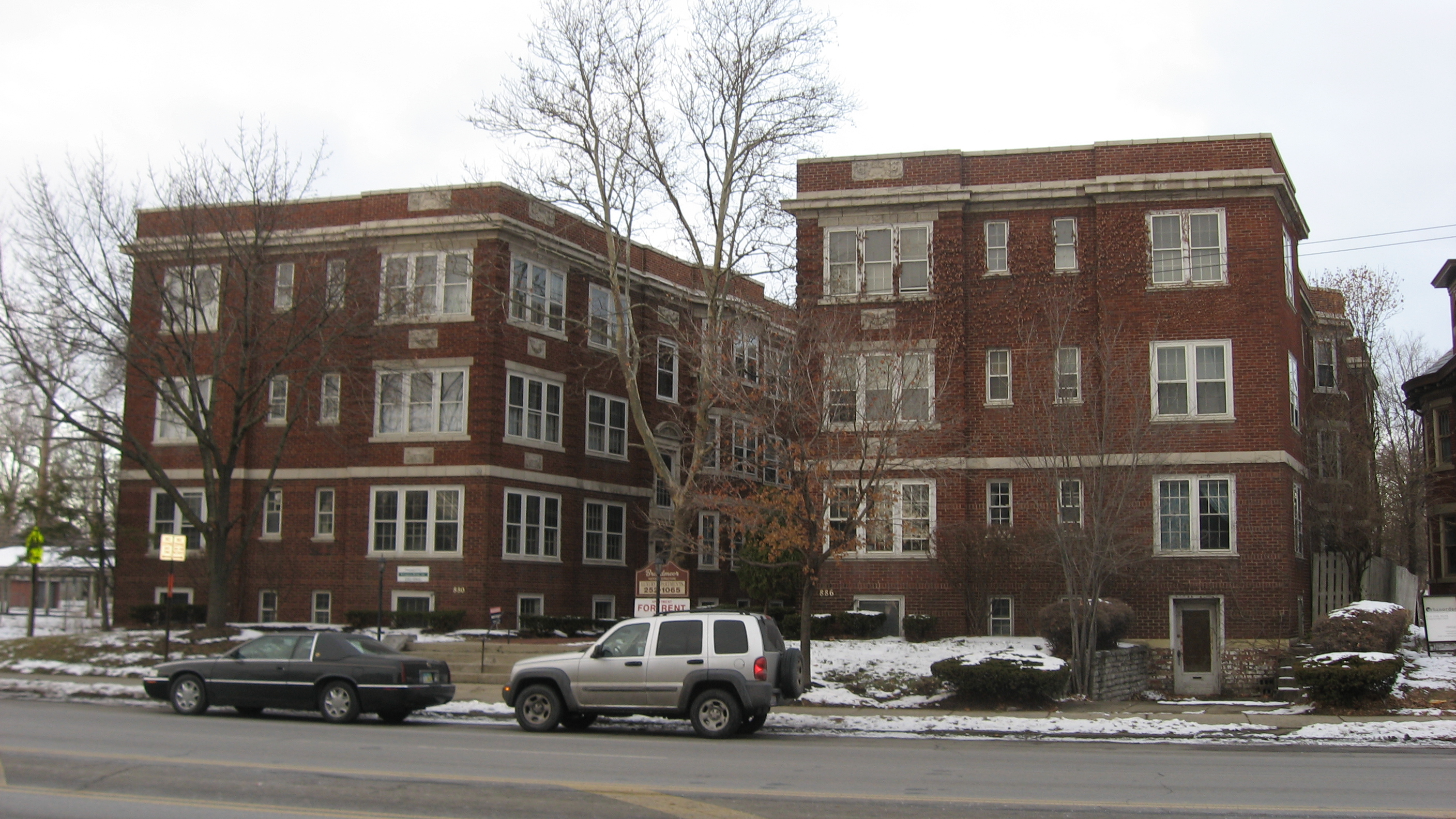
- Interactive map highlighting the building's location
- Location: 880-886 E. Broad St., Columbus, Ohio
- Coordinates: 39°57′54″N 82°58′38″W
- Area: Less than 1 acre (0.40 ha)
- Built: 1916
- Architect: Howell and Thomas, Cheek Brothers
- Architectural style: Late 19th And 20th Century Revivals, Second Renaissance Revival
- MPS: East Broad Street MRA
- NRHP reference No.: 86003404
- Added to NRHP: December 16, 1986

The Broad Street Apartments are buildings on Broad Street in Columbus, Ohio, in the King-Lincoln Bronzeville neighborhood. They are near the Columbus College of Art and Design (CCAD), along with the Columbus State Community College. The property is also part of the 18th & E. Broad Historic District of the Columbus Register of Historic Properties.

== See also ==
- National Register of Historic Places listings in Columbus, Ohio
