= Linus B. Kauffman House =

Historic house in Ohio, United States

- U.S. National Register of Historic Places
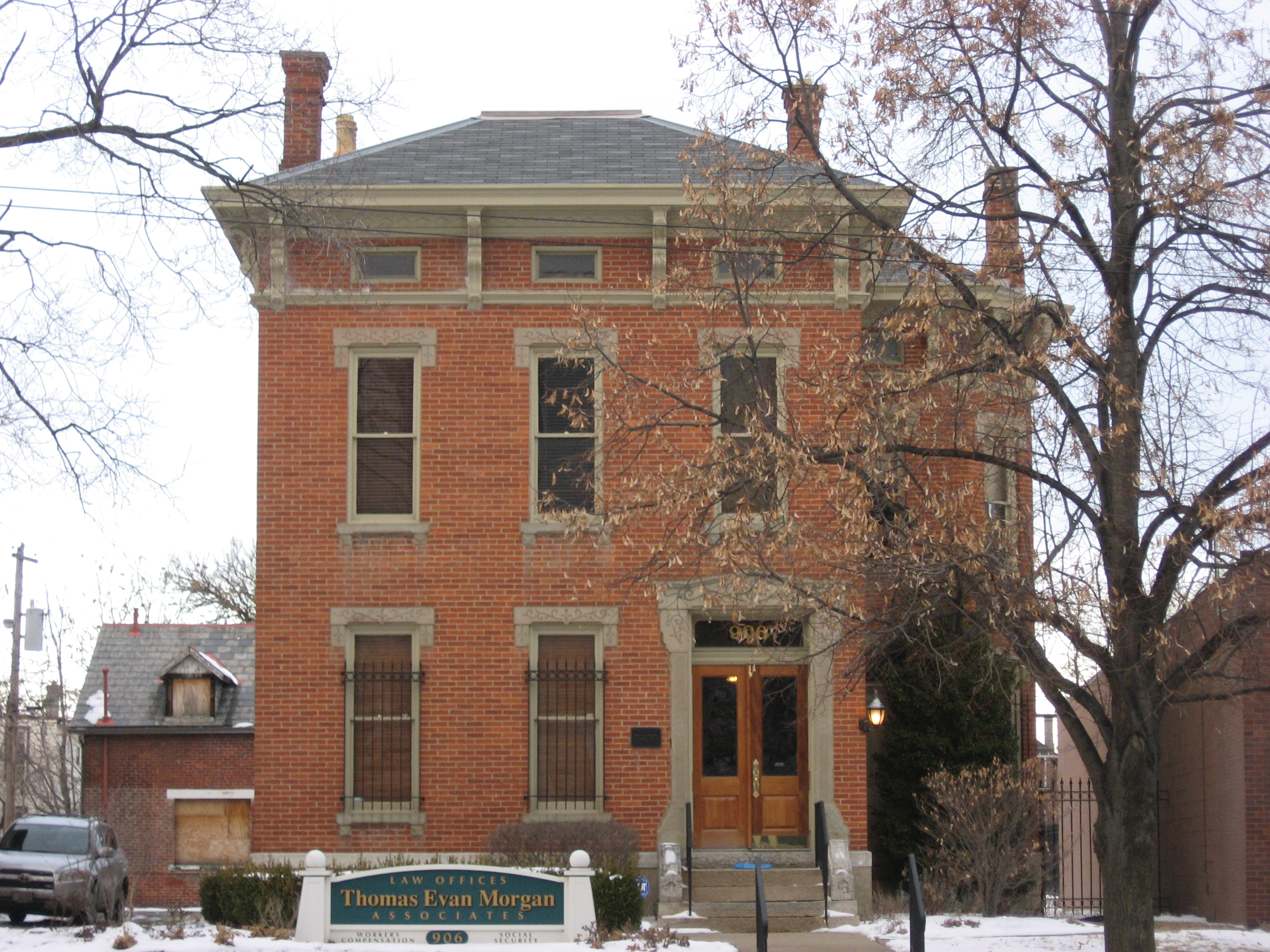
- Interactive map highlighting the building's location
- Location: 906 E. Broad St., Columbus, Ohio
- Coordinates: 39.965302°N 82.976615°W
- Built: 1870
- Architectural style: Italianate
- MPS: East Broad Street MRA
- NRHP reference No.: 86003410
- Added to NRHP: December 17, 1986

The Linus B. Kauffman House is a historic house in Columbus, Ohio, United States. The house was built in 1870 and was listed on the National Register of Historic Places in 1986. The Linus B. Kauffman House was built at a time when East Broad Street was a tree-lined avenue featuring the most ornate houses in Columbus; the house reflects the character of the area at the time. The building is also part of the 18th & E. Broad Historic District on the Columbus Register of Historic Properties, added to the register in 1988.

The house was home to Linus B. Kauffman, vice president of the Kauffman-Lattimer Company, from 1907 to 1931. His widow outlived him, residing there until 1936.

== See also ==
- National Register of Historic Places listings in Columbus, Ohio
