= 21st & E. Broad Historic Group =

- 21st & E. Broad Historic District
- U.S. National Register of Historic Places
- U.S. Historic district
- Columbus Register of Historic Properties
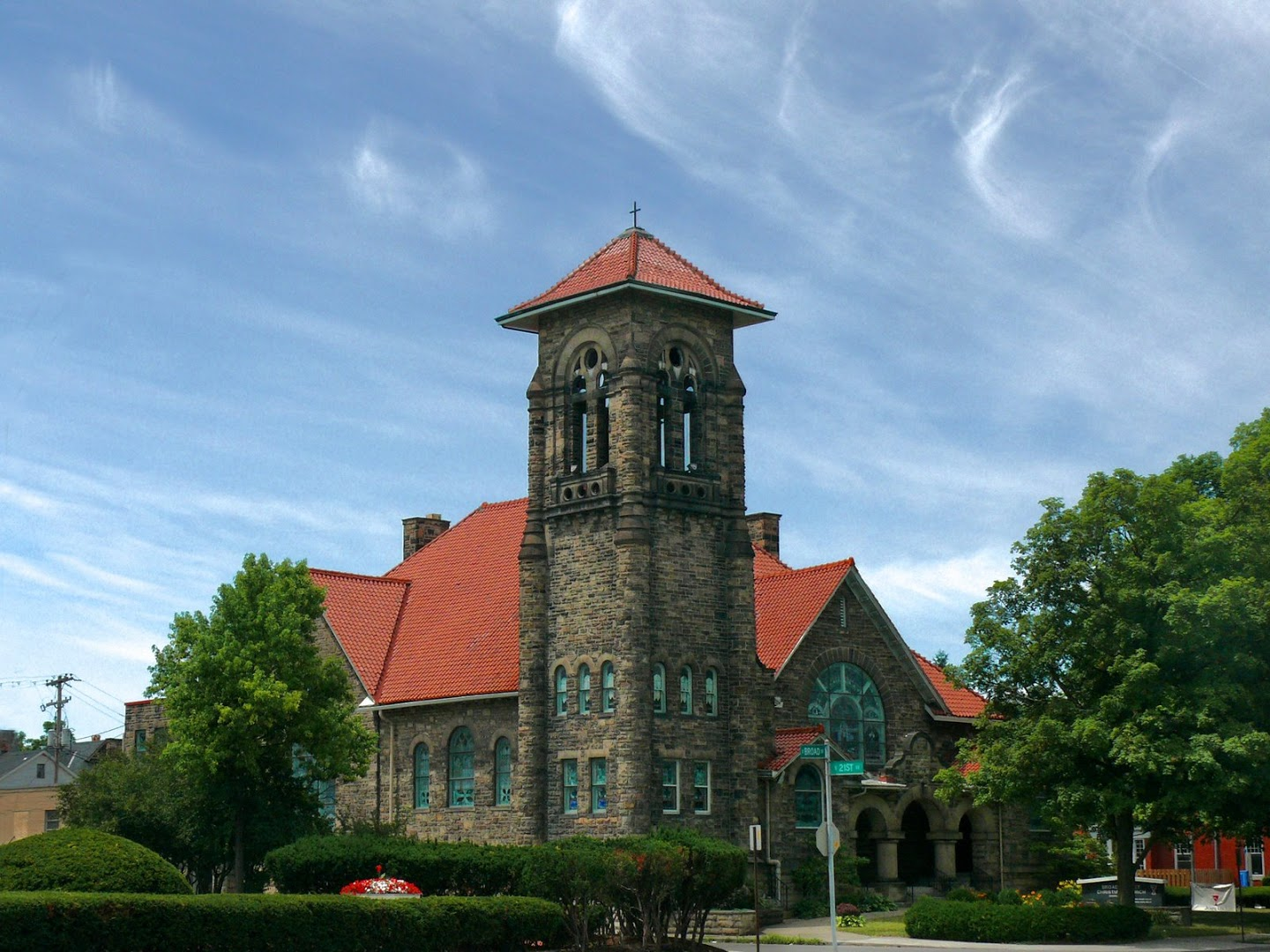
- Broad Street Christian Church, a contributing building
- Map of the 21st & E. Broad Historic District among other historic sites and districts
- Location: Columbus, Ohio
- Coordinates: 39.96499°N 82.97306°W
- MPS: East Broad Street MRA
- NRHP reference No.: 64000619
- CRHP No.: CR-48

Significant dates
- Added to NRHP: November 16, 1986
- Designated CRHP: March 15, 1988

The 21st & E. Broad Historic District is a historic district on Broad Street in the Near East Side of Columbus, Ohio. The district was added to the Columbus Register of Historic Properties in 1988. Its properties were added to the E. Broad St. Multiple Resources Area on the National Register of Historic Places in 1986.

== Contributing structures ==
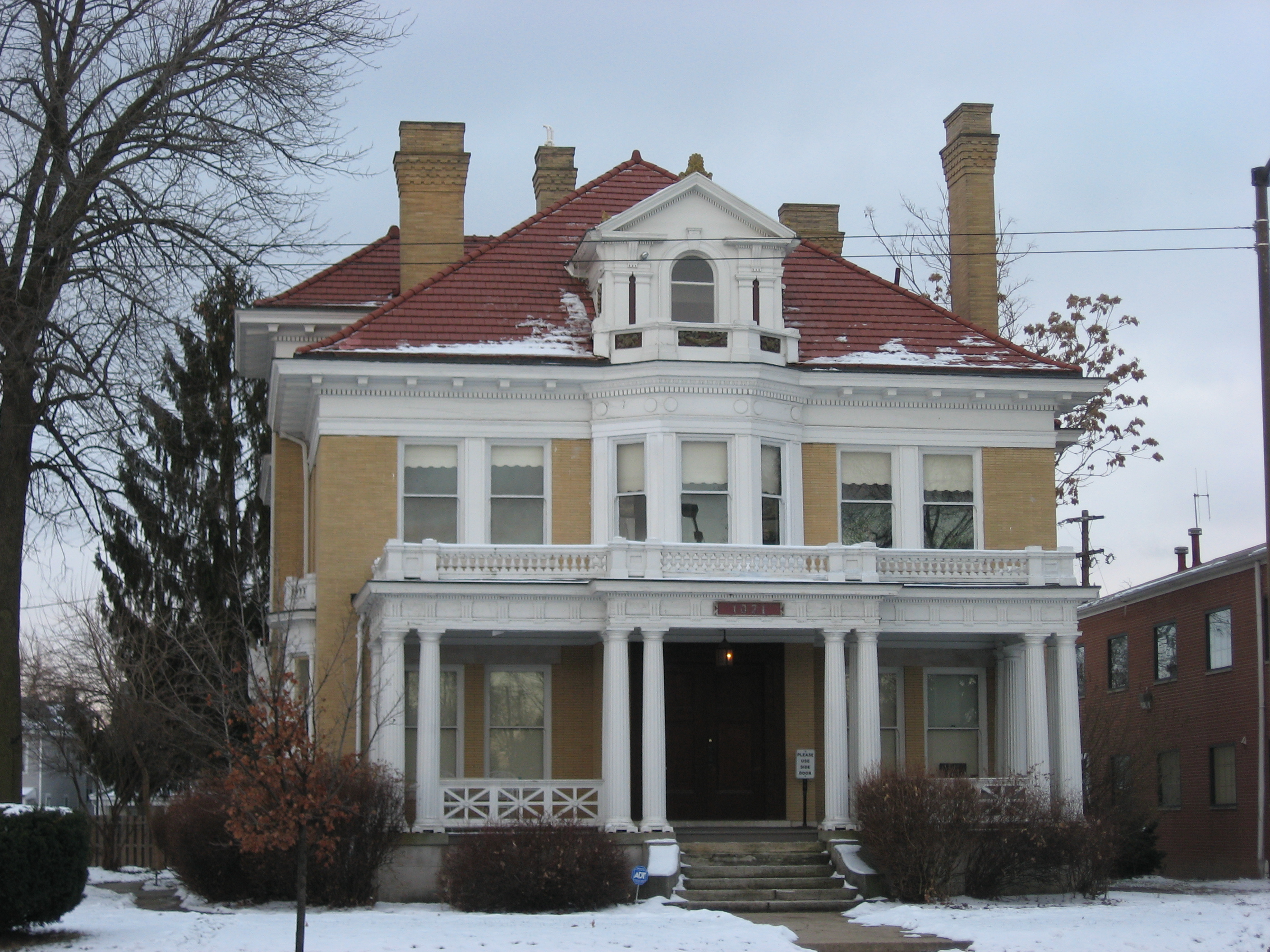
Hanna House

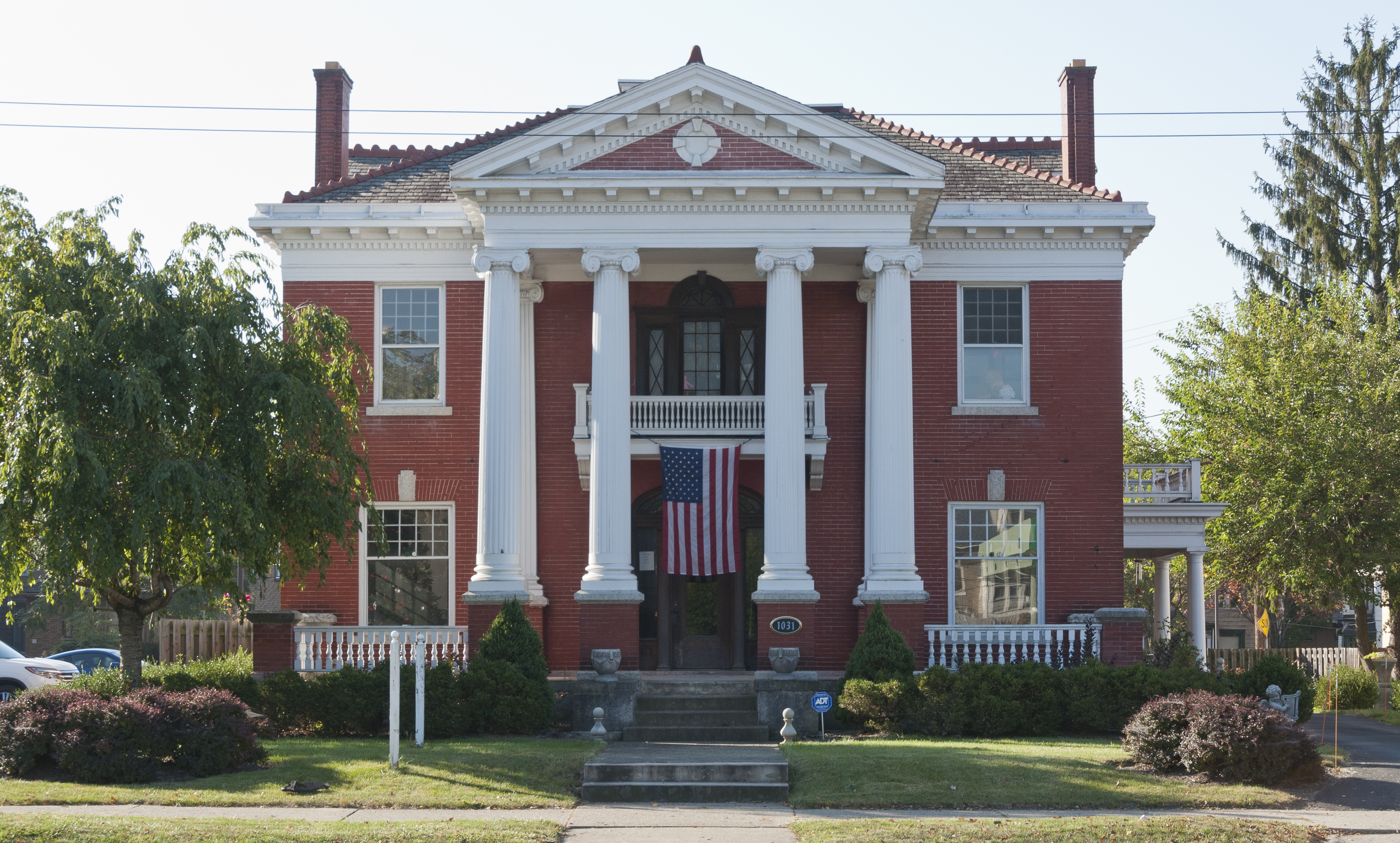
Scofield-Sanor House

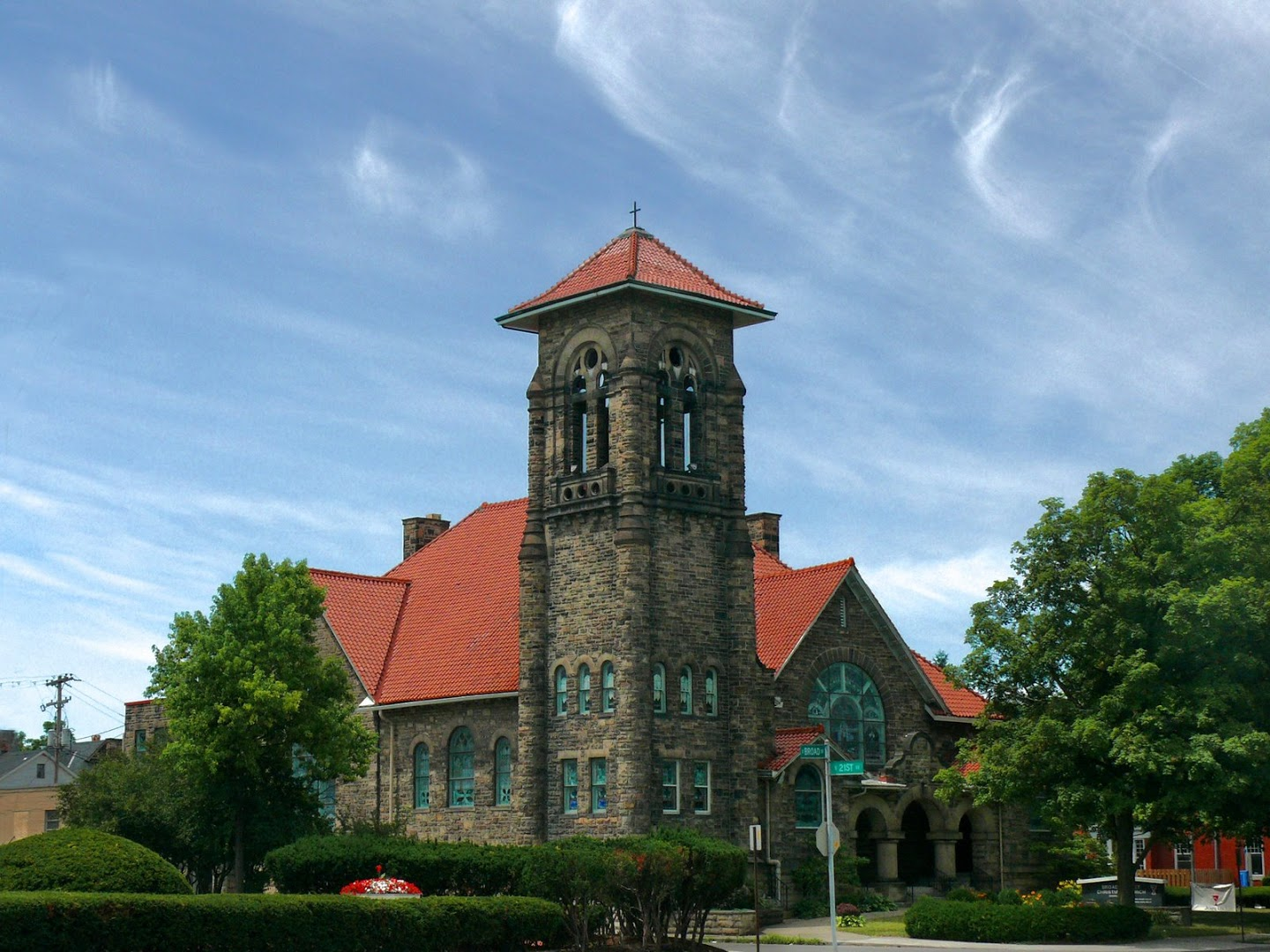
Broad Street Christian Church

== See also ==
- 18th & E. Broad Historic District
- National Register of Historic Places listings in Columbus, Ohio
