= Soloman Levy House =

Historic house in Ohio, United States

- U.S. National Register of Historic Places
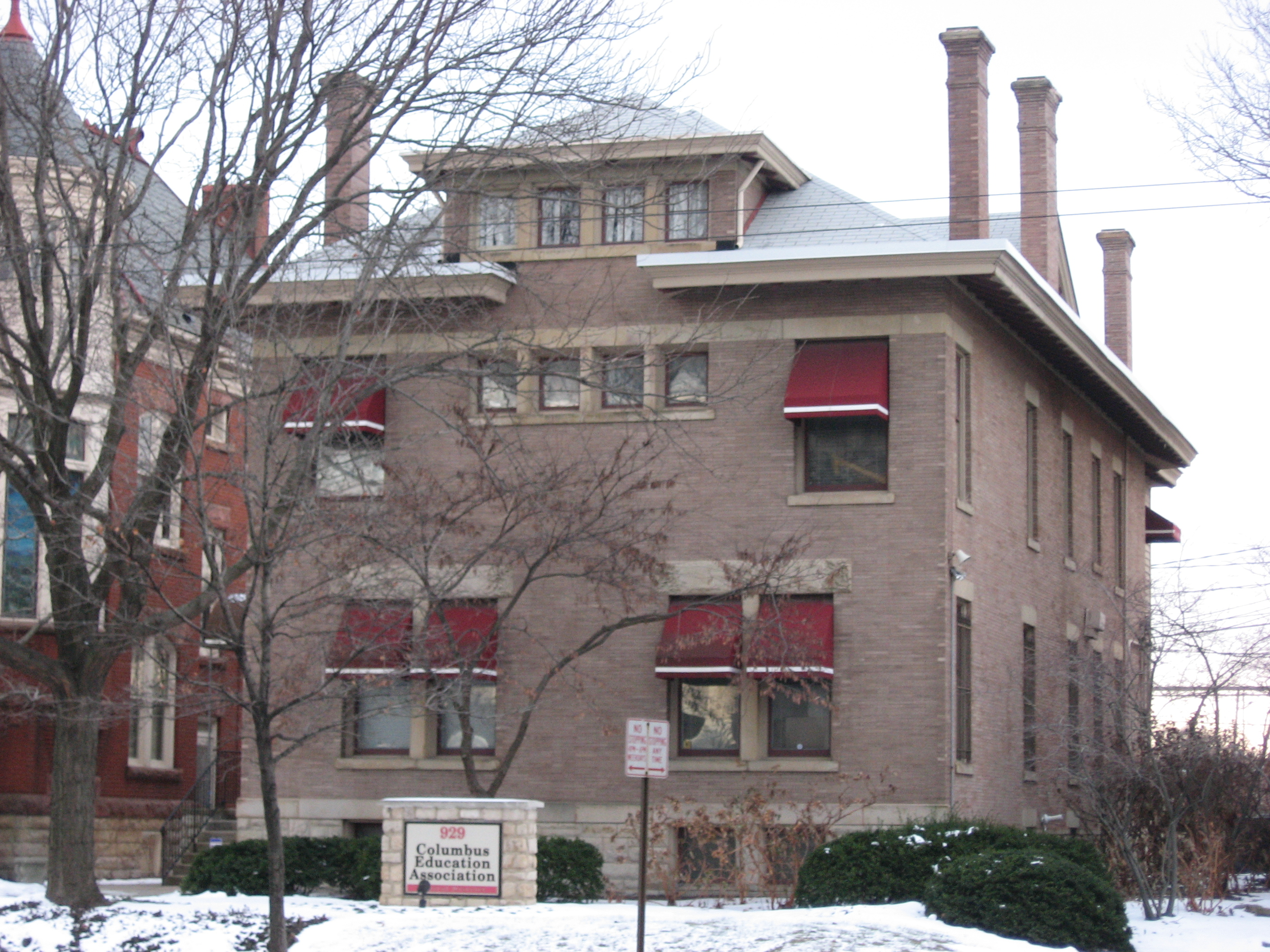
- Interactive map highlighting the building's location
- Location: 929 E. Broad St., Columbus, Ohio
- Coordinates: 39.964761°N 82.975888°W
- Built: c. 1910-11
- MPS: East Broad Street MRA
- NRHP reference No.: 86003437
- Added to NRHP: December 17, 1986

The Soloman Levy House is a historic house in Columbus, Ohio, United States. The house was built c. 1910-11 and was listed on the National Register of Historic Places in 1986. The Soloman Levy House was built at a time when East Broad Street was a tree-lined avenue featuring the most ornate houses in Columbus; the house reflects the character of the area at the time. The building is also part of the 18th & E. Broad Historic District on the Columbus Register of Historic Properties, added to the register in 1988.

The house is a significant example of early 20th century architecture, with elements of the Arts and Crafts movement and Prairie style.

== See also ==
- National Register of Historic Places listings in Columbus, Ohio
