= Hanna House =

Historic house in Ohio, United States

- U.S. National Register of Historic Places
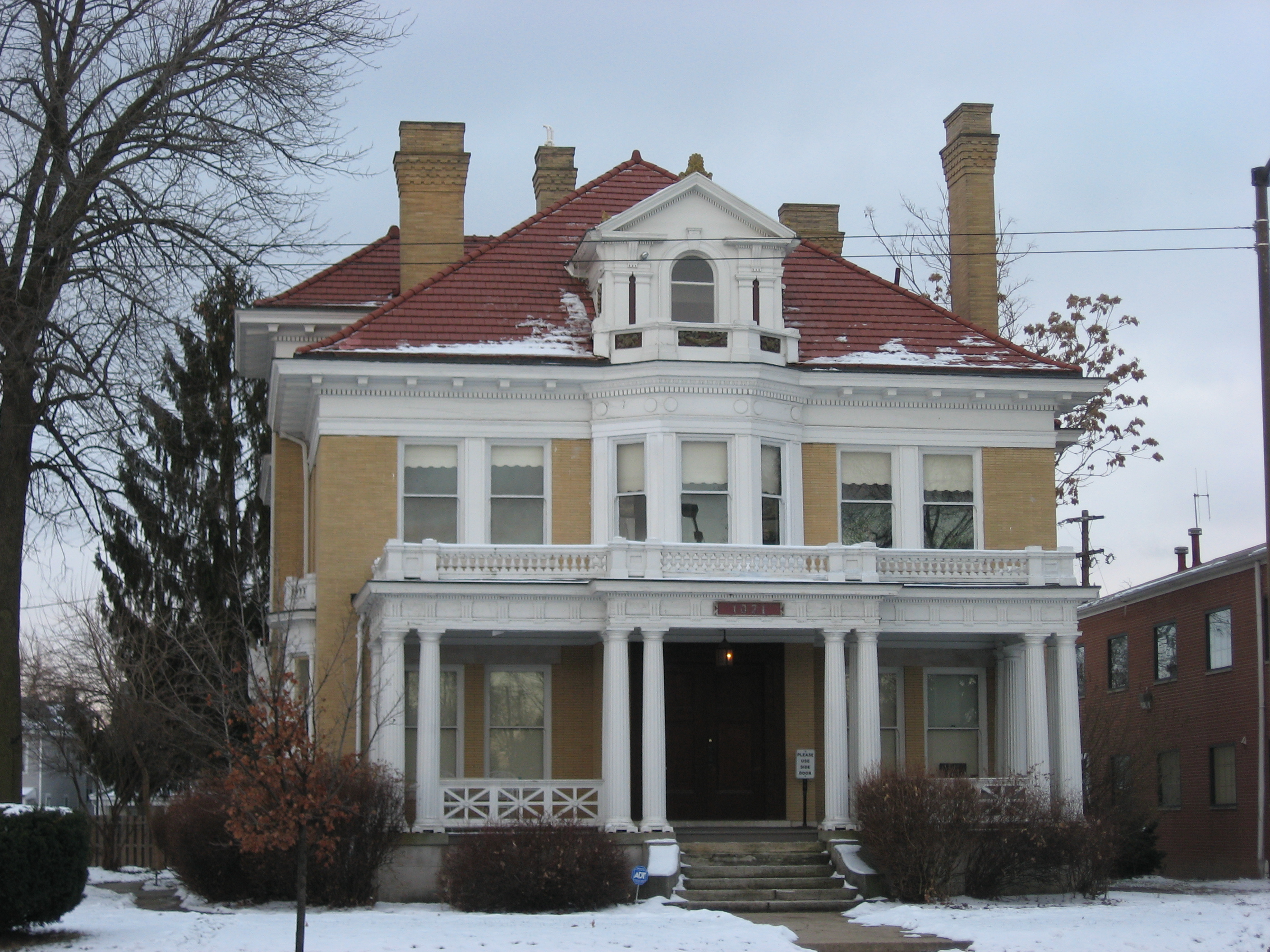
- Interactive map highlighting the building's location
- Location: 1021 E. Broad St., Columbus, Ohio
- Coordinates: 39.96504°N 82.97345°W
- Built: 1900
- Architectural style: Colonial Revival
- MPS: East Broad Street MRA
- NRHP reference No.: 79001835
- Added to NRHP: April 19, 1979

The Hanna House is a historic house in Columbus, Ohio, United States. The house was built in 1900 and was listed on the National Register of Historic Places in 1979. The building and its carriage house were built for James B. Hanna, president and co-founder of the Hanna Paint Company. The Hanna House was built at a time when East Broad Street was a tree-lined avenue featuring the most ornate houses in Columbus. The house remained in the Hanna family until 1975, and afterwards became an insurance office. The building is also part of the 21st & E. Broad Historic Group on the Columbus Register of Historic Properties, added to the register in 1988.

== See also ==
- National Register of Historic Places listings in Columbus, Ohio
