= C. E. Morris House =

Historic house in Ohio, United States

- C.E. Morris House
- U.S. National Register of Historic Places
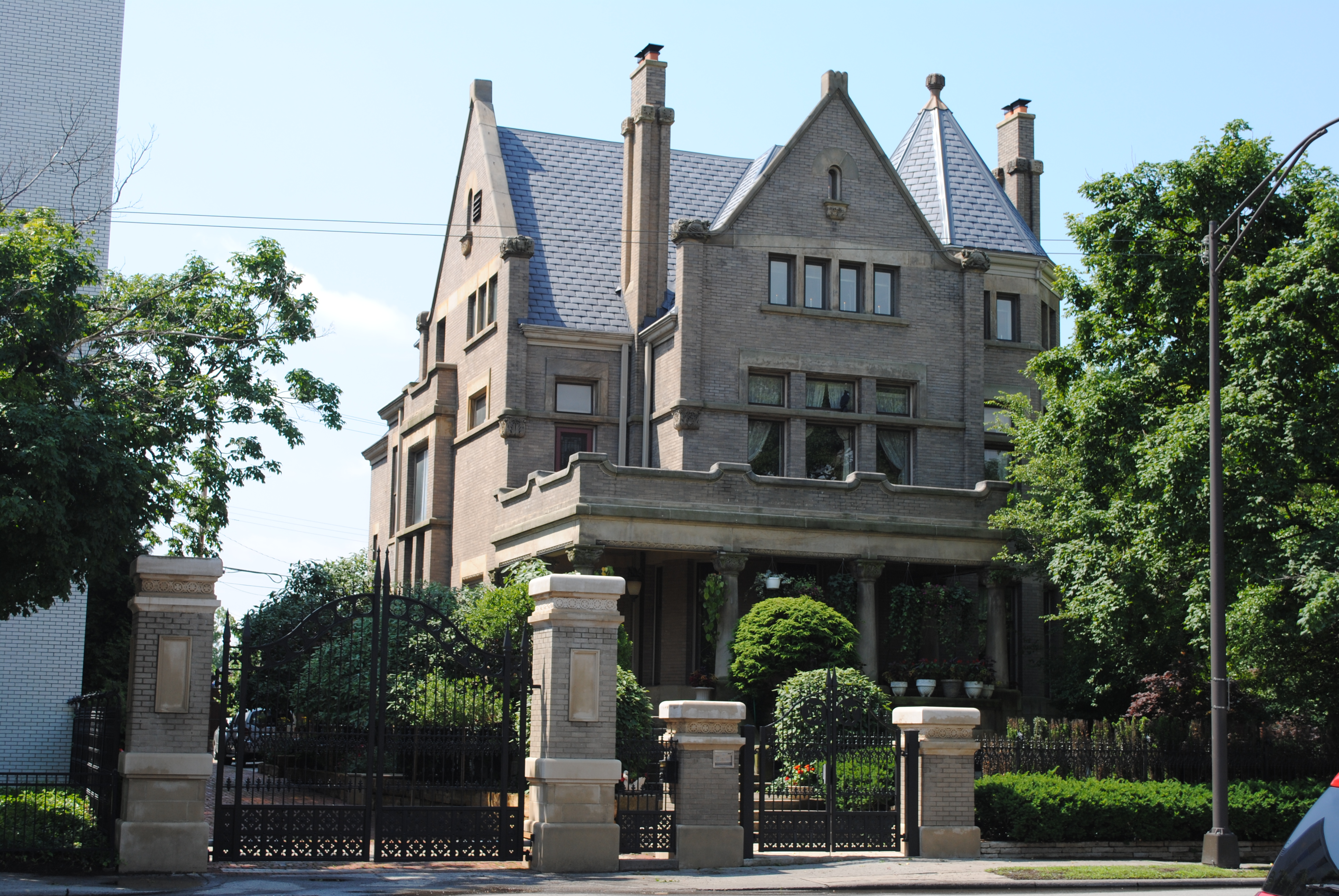
- Interactive map highlighting the building's location
- Location: 875 E. Broad St., Columbus, Ohio
- Coordinates: 39.964611°N 82.977131°W
- Built: 1897
- MPS: East Broad Street MRA
- NRHP reference No.: 86003398
- Added to NRHP: December 17, 1986

The C.E. Morris House is a historic house in Columbus, Ohio, United States. The house was built in 1897 and was listed on the National Register of Historic Places in 1986. The C.E. Morris House was built at a time when East Broad Street was a tree-lined avenue featuring the most ornate houses in Columbus; the house reflects the character of the area at the time. The building is also part of the 18th & E. Broad Historic District on the Columbus Register of Historic Properties, added to the register in 1988.

The house was built for Charles E. Morris, owner of Morris Ironworks, who lived there until 1924. It was later rented out for rooms, and further on, used for commercial space.

== See also ==
- National Register of Historic Places listings in Columbus, Ohio
