= Erwin W. Schueller House =

Historic house in Ohio, United States

- U.S. National Register of Historic Places
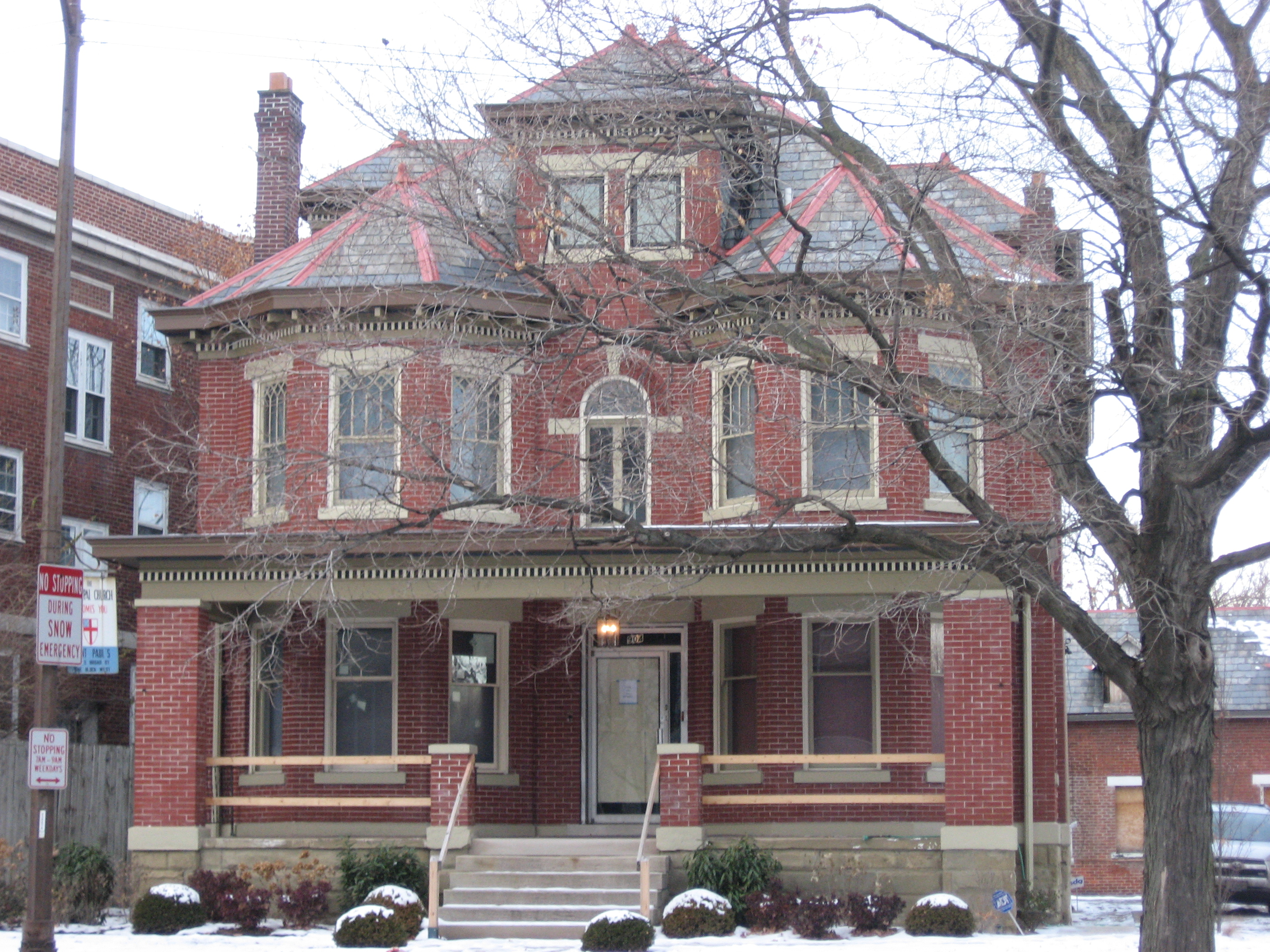
- Interactive map highlighting the building's location
- Location: 904 E. Broad St., Columbus, Ohio
- Coordinates: 39.965243°N 82.976807°W
- Built: 1909
- MPS: East Broad Street MRA
- NRHP reference No.: 86003406
- Added to NRHP: December 17, 1986

The Erwin W. Schueller House is a historic house in Columbus, Ohio, United States. The house was built in 1909 and was listed on the National Register of Historic Places in 1986. The Erwin W. Schueller House was built at a time when East Broad Street was a tree-lined avenue featuring the most ornate houses in Columbus; the house reflects the character of the area at the time. The building is also part of the 18th & E. Broad Historic District on the Columbus Register of Historic Properties, added to the register in 1988.

The house was home to physician Erwin W. Schueller from its completion until 1924. His wife continued living in the home until the 1940s, after which the building was converted for office use.

== See also ==
- National Register of Historic Places listings in Columbus, Ohio
