= 18th & E. Broad Historic District =

Historic district in Ohio, United States

- U.S. National Register of Historic Places
- U.S. Historic district
- Columbus Register of Historic Properties
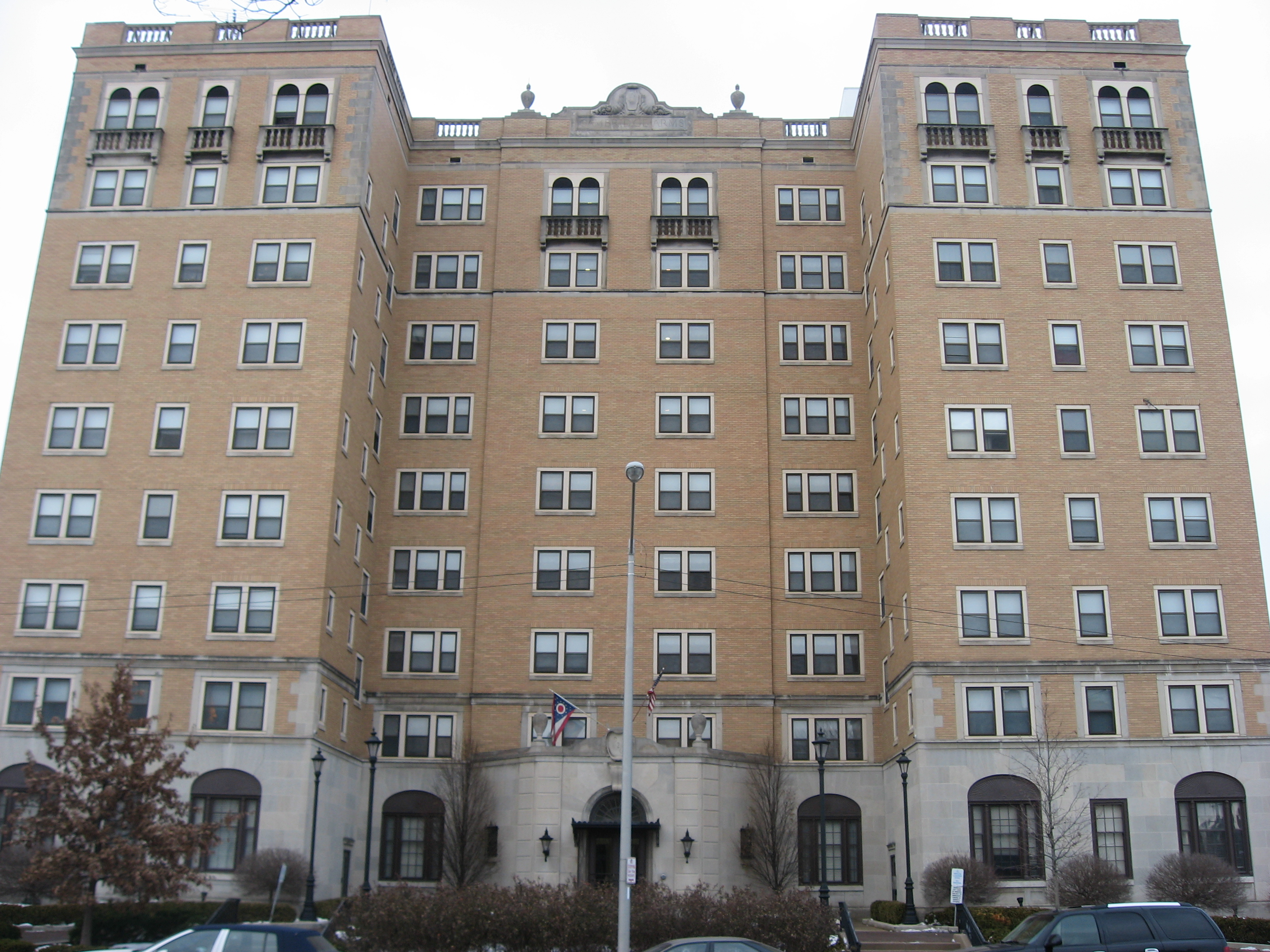
- The Cambridge Arms, a contributing building
- Map of the 18th & E. Broad Historic District among other historic sites and districts
- Location: Columbus, Ohio
- Coordinates: 39.96476°N 82.97656°W
- MPS: East Broad Street MRA
- NRHP reference No.: 64000619
- CRHP No.: CR-49

Significant dates
- Added to NRHP: November 16, 1986
- Designated CRHP: March 15, 1988

The 18th & E. Broad Historic District is a historic district on Broad Street in the Near East Side of Columbus, Ohio. The district was added to the Columbus Register of Historic Properties in 1988. Its properties were added to the E. Broad St. Multiple Resources Area on the National Register of Historic Places in 1986.

== Contributing structures ==
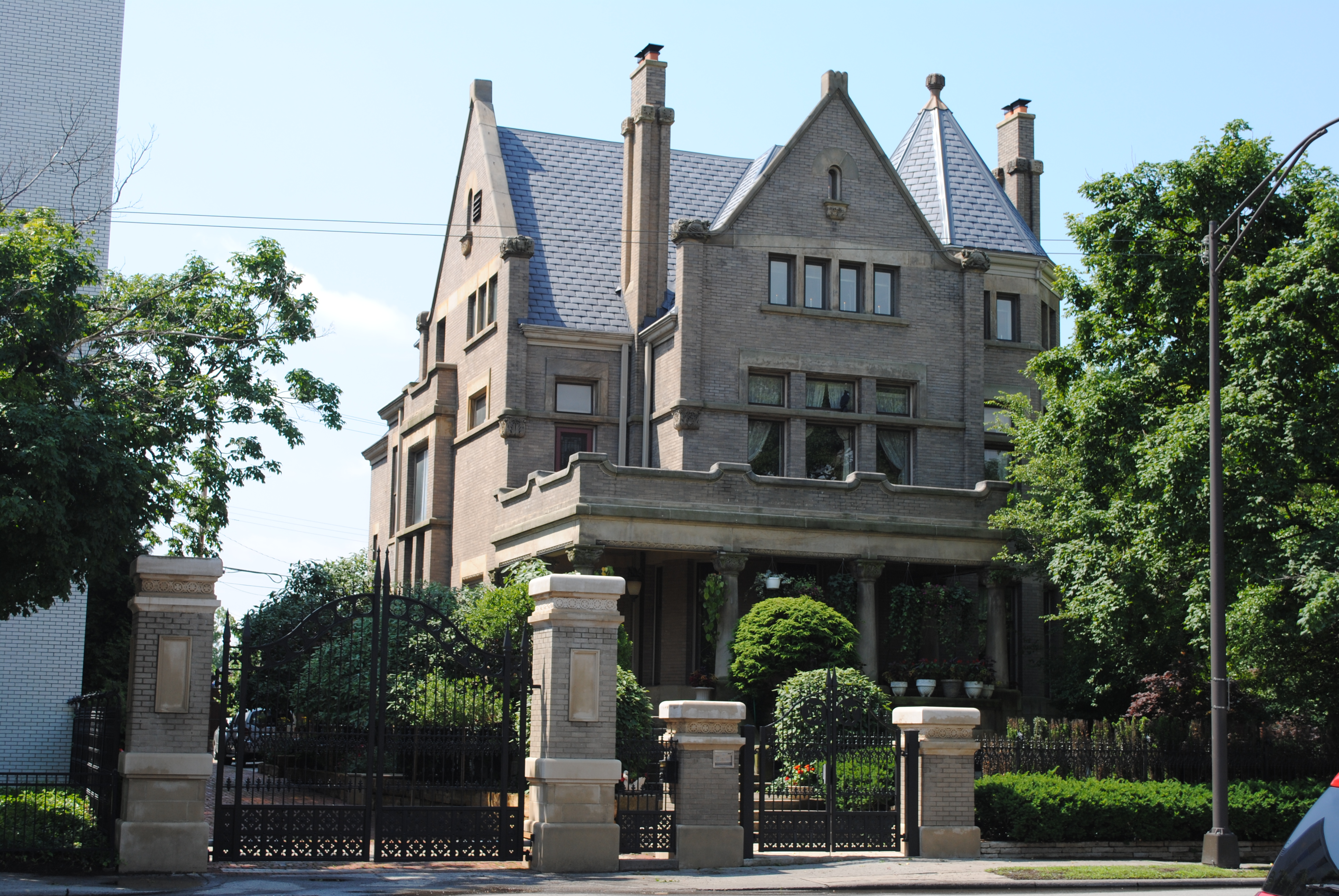
C.E. Morris House

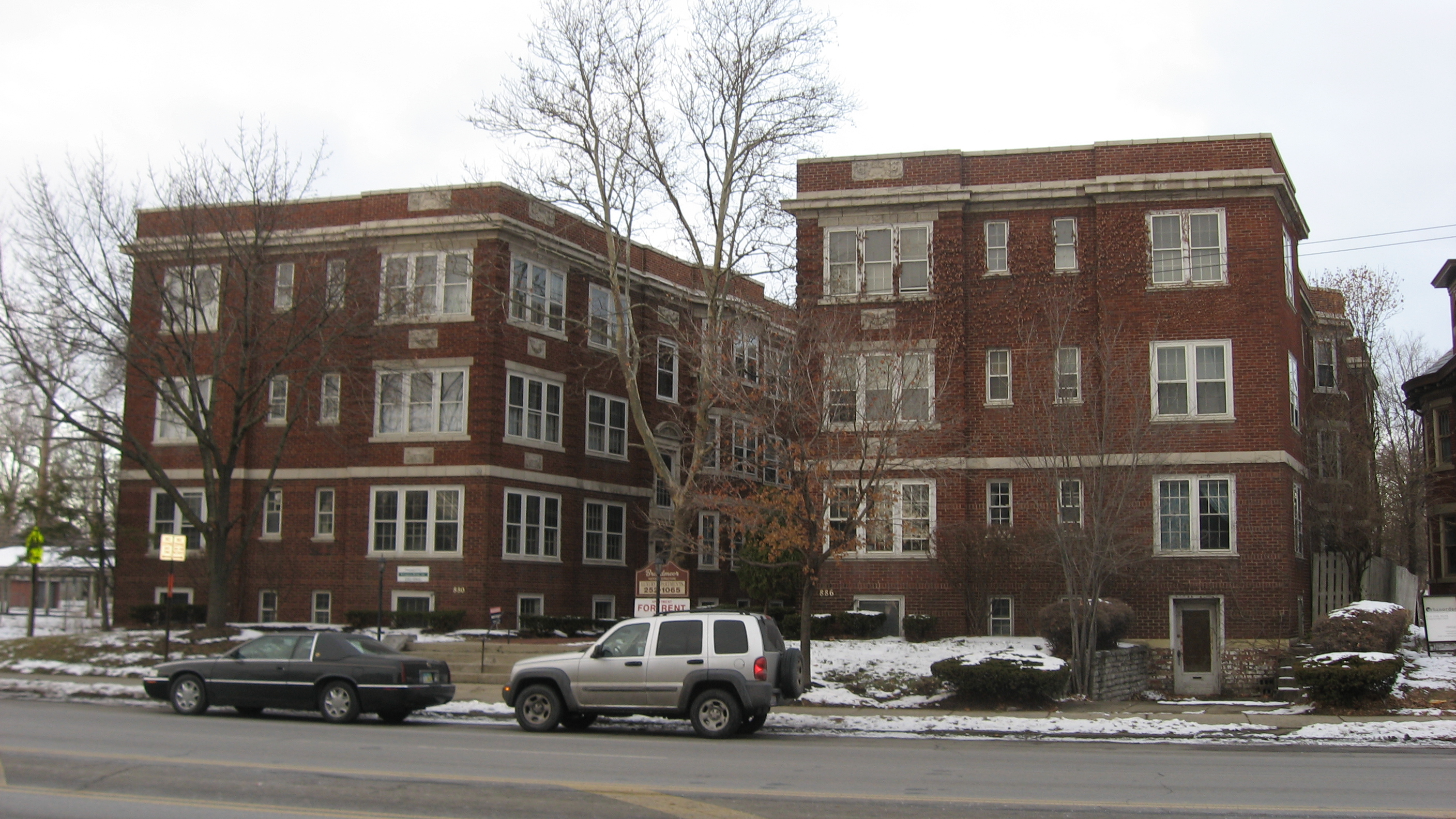
Broad Street Apartments

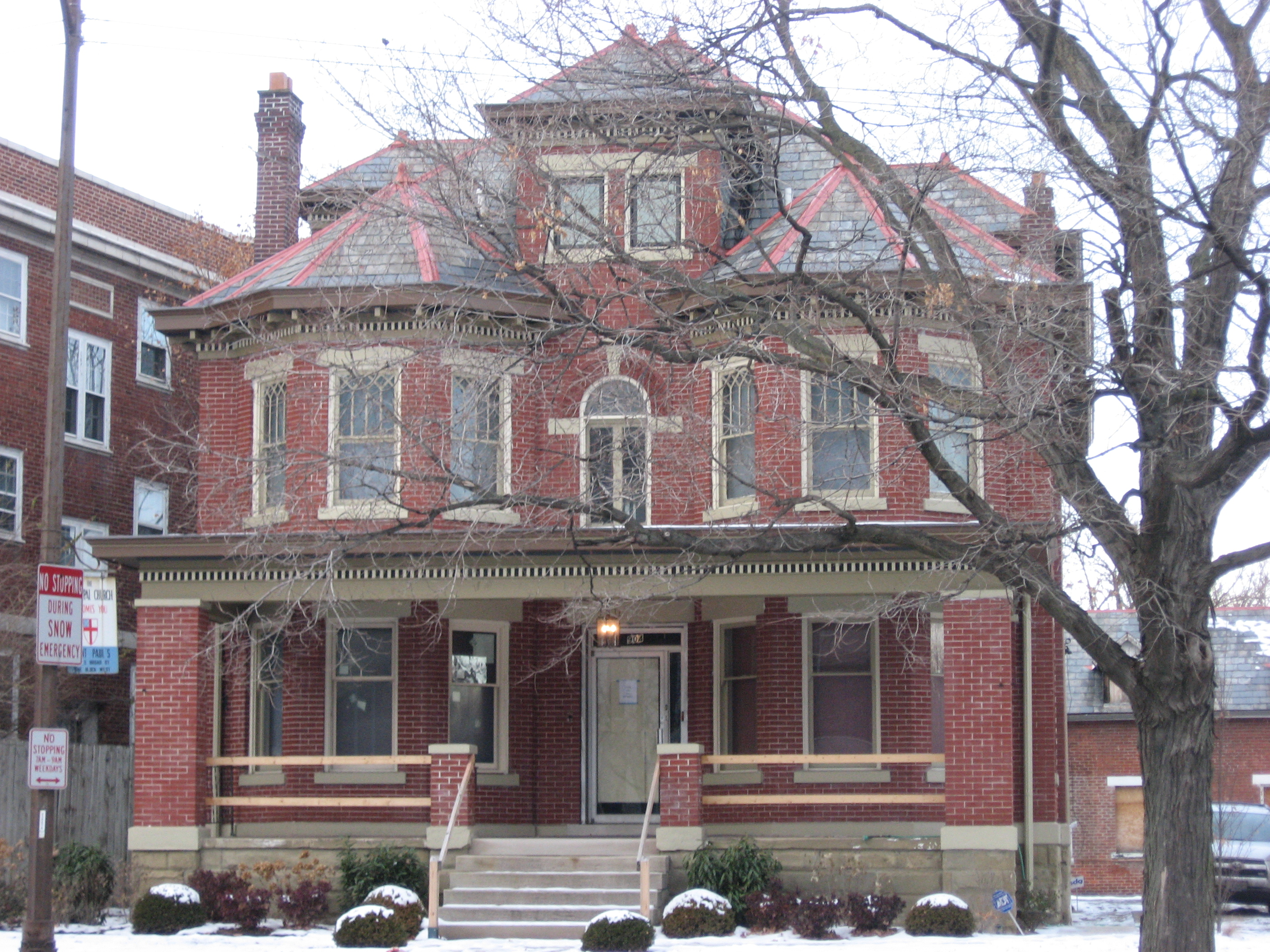
Erwin W. Schueller House

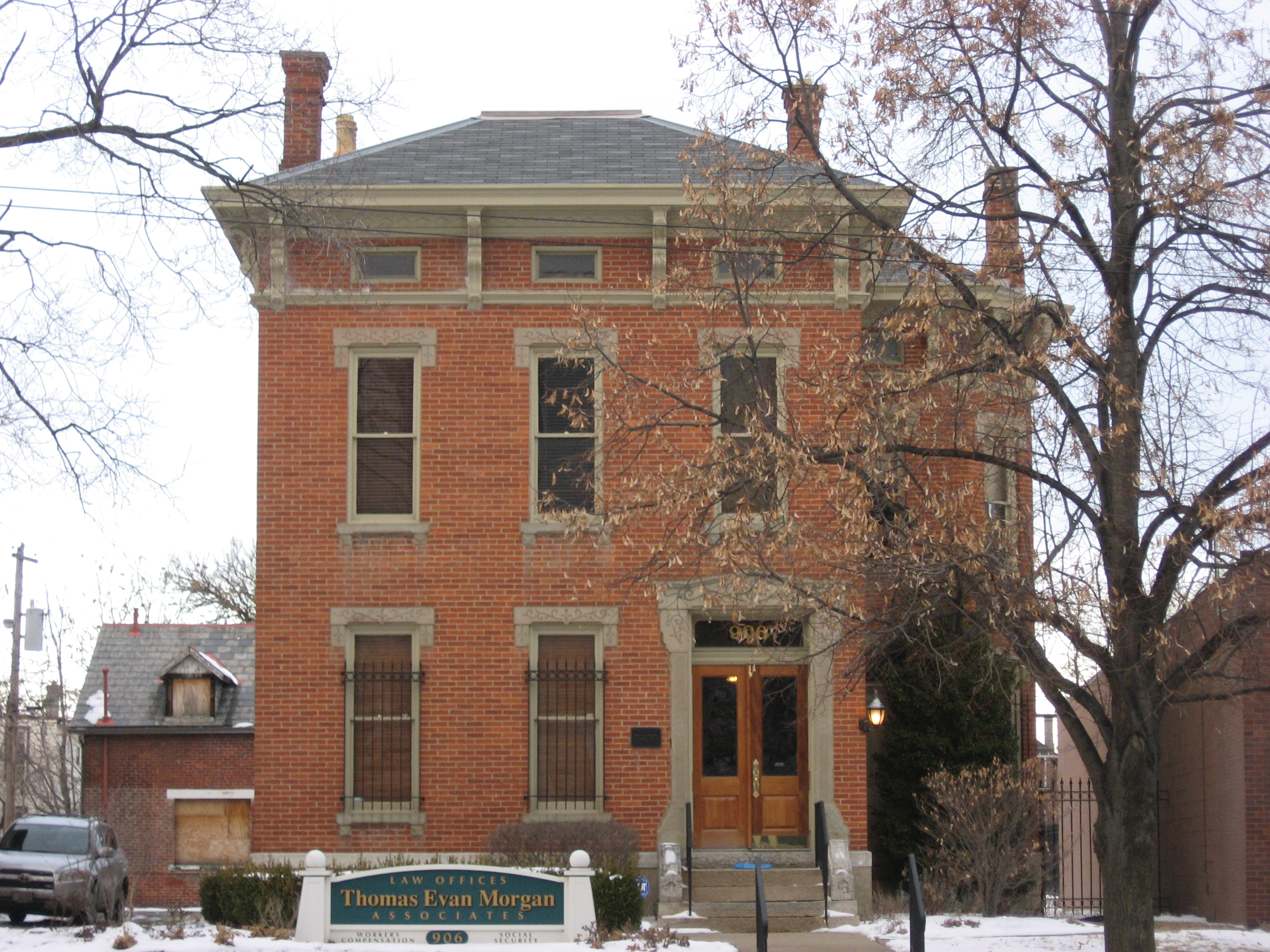
Linus B. Kauffman House

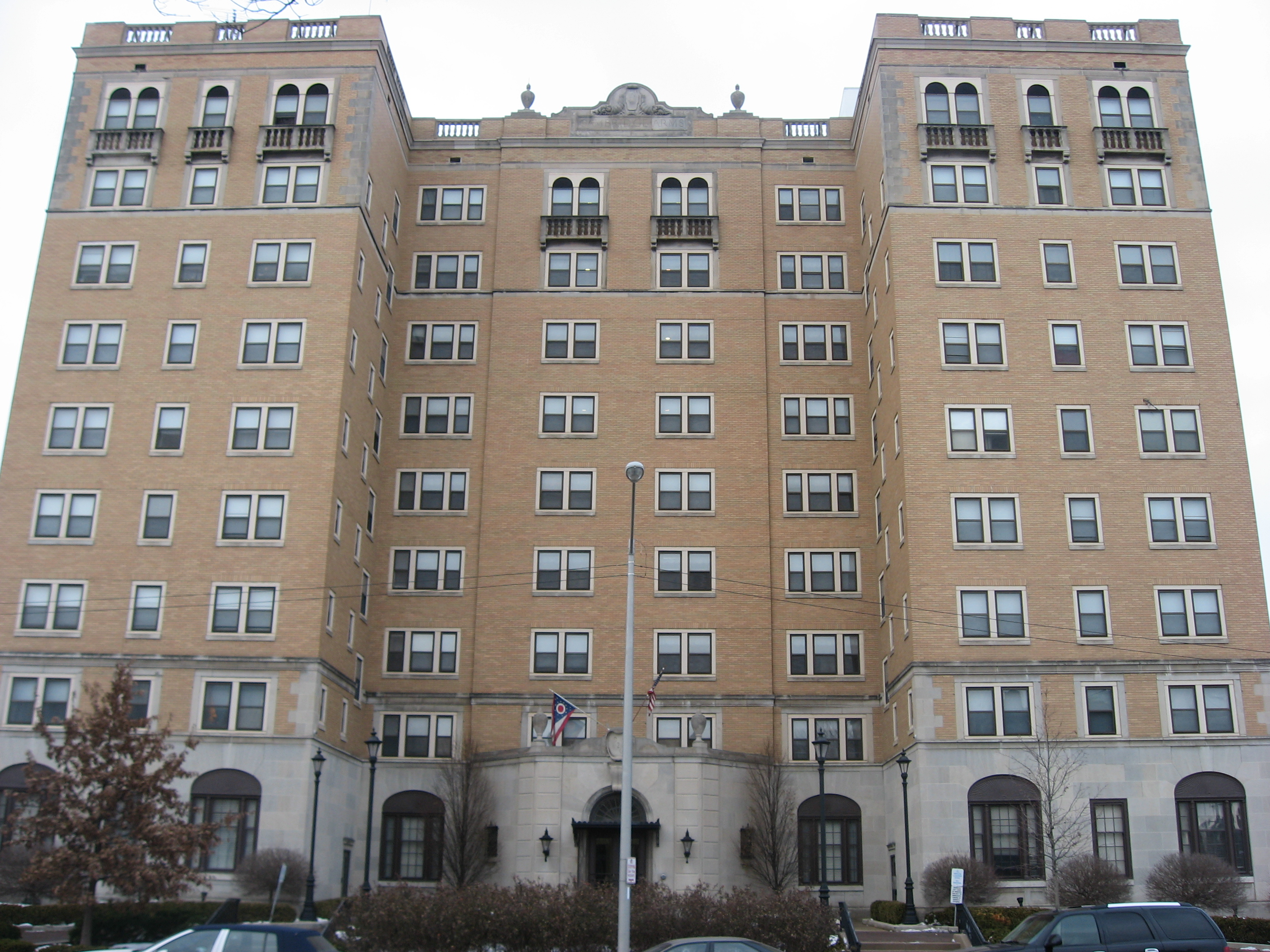
The Cambridge Arms

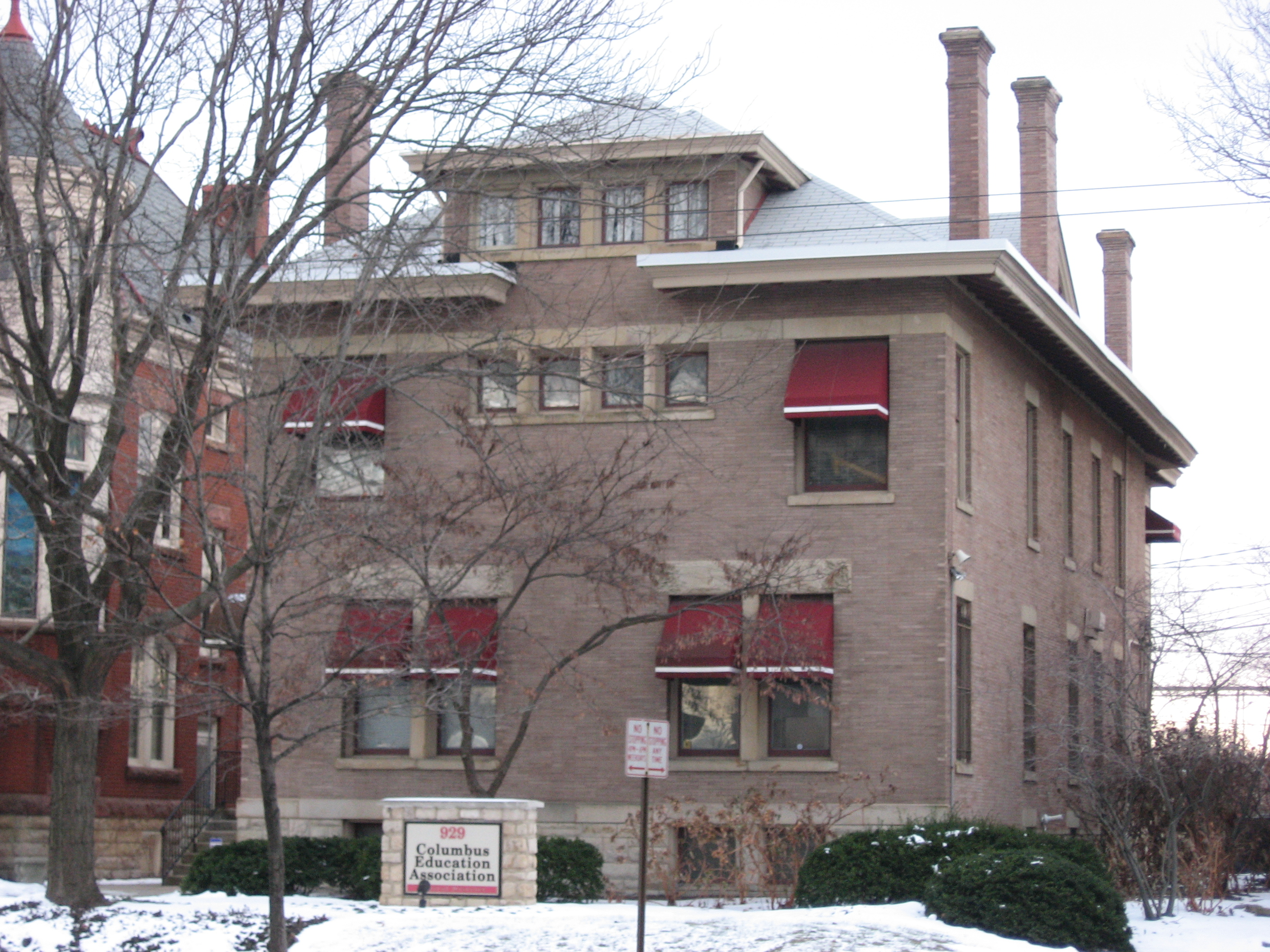
Soloman Levy House

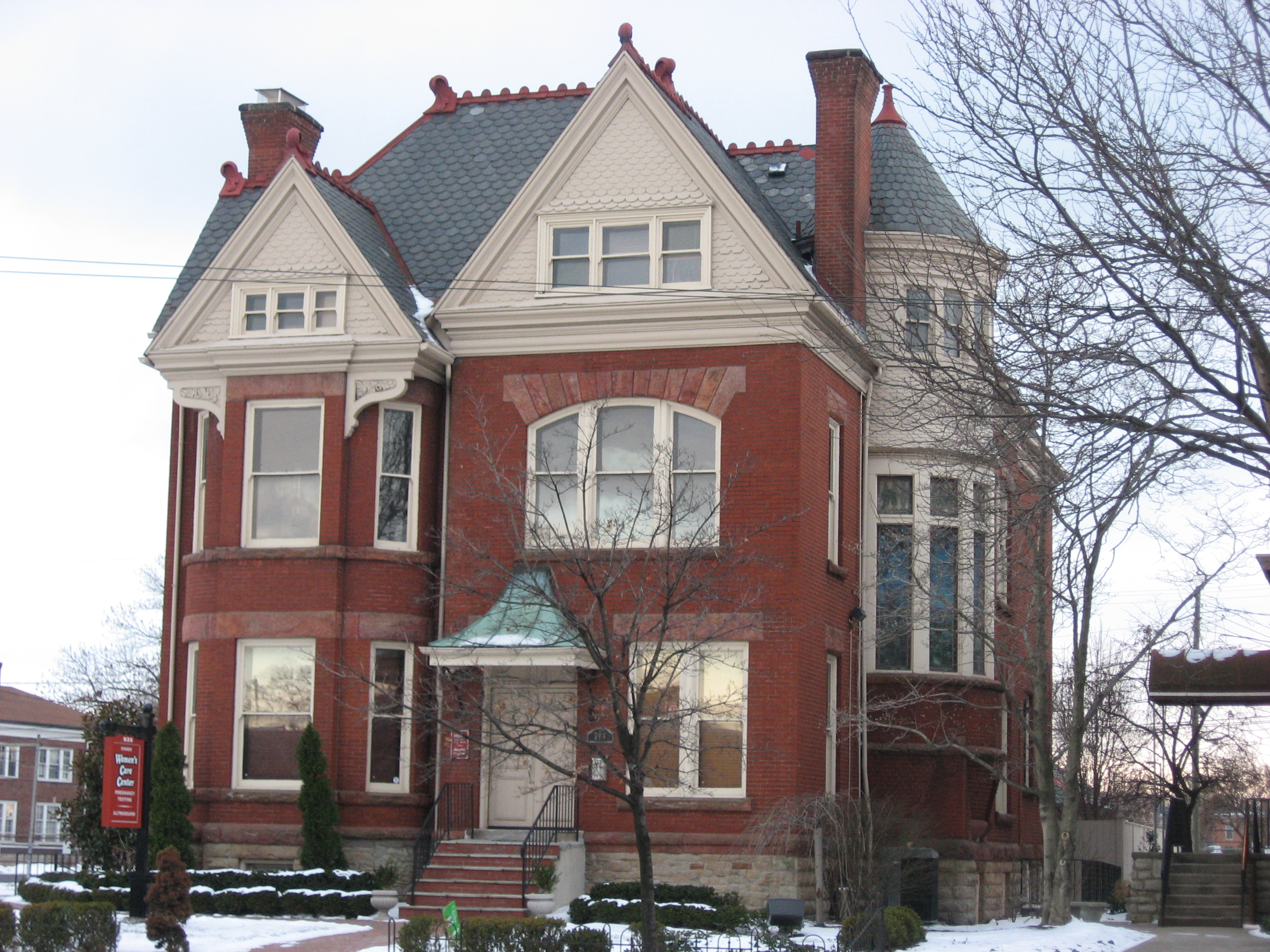
Sharp-Page House

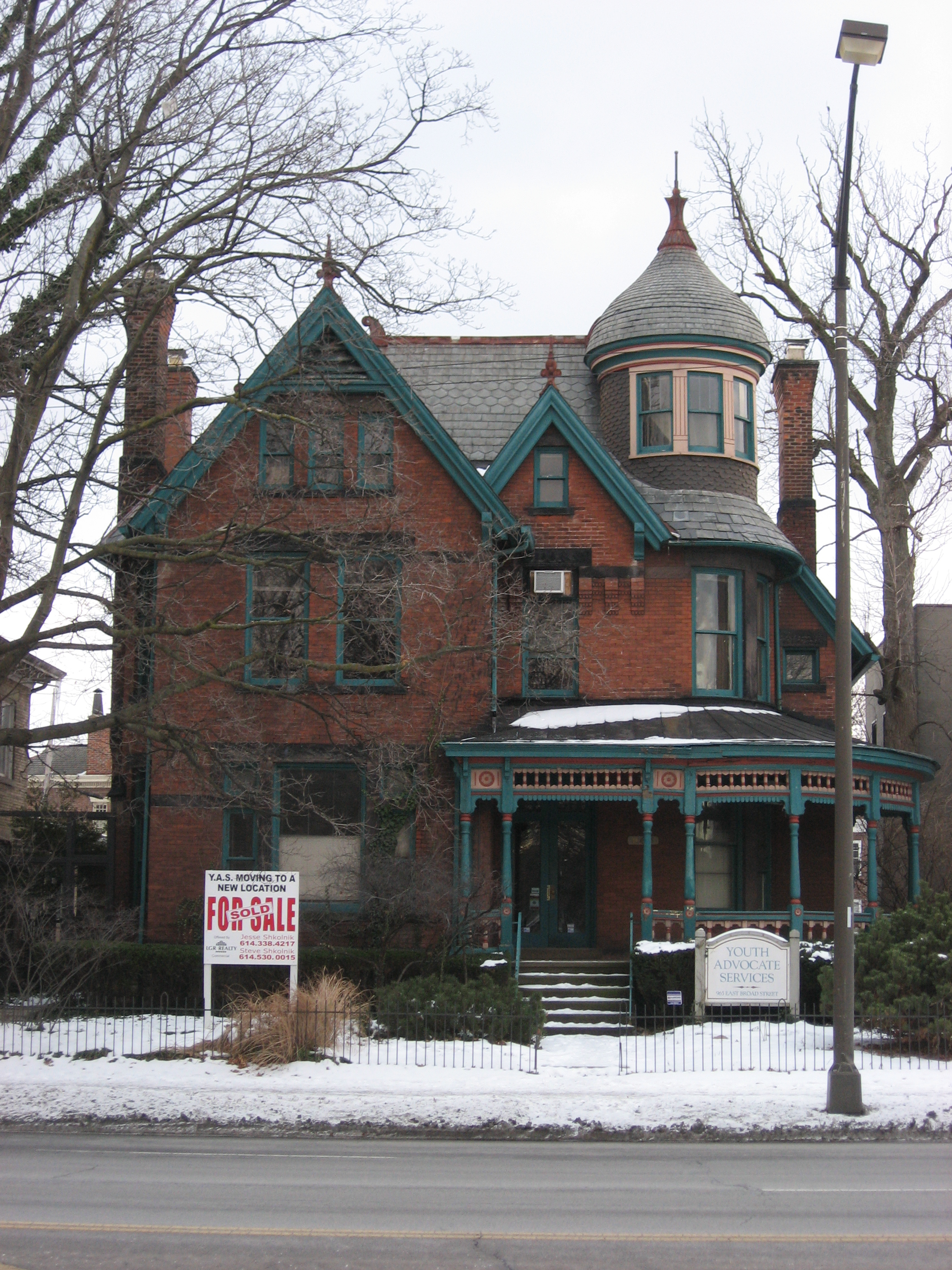
Shedd-Dunn House

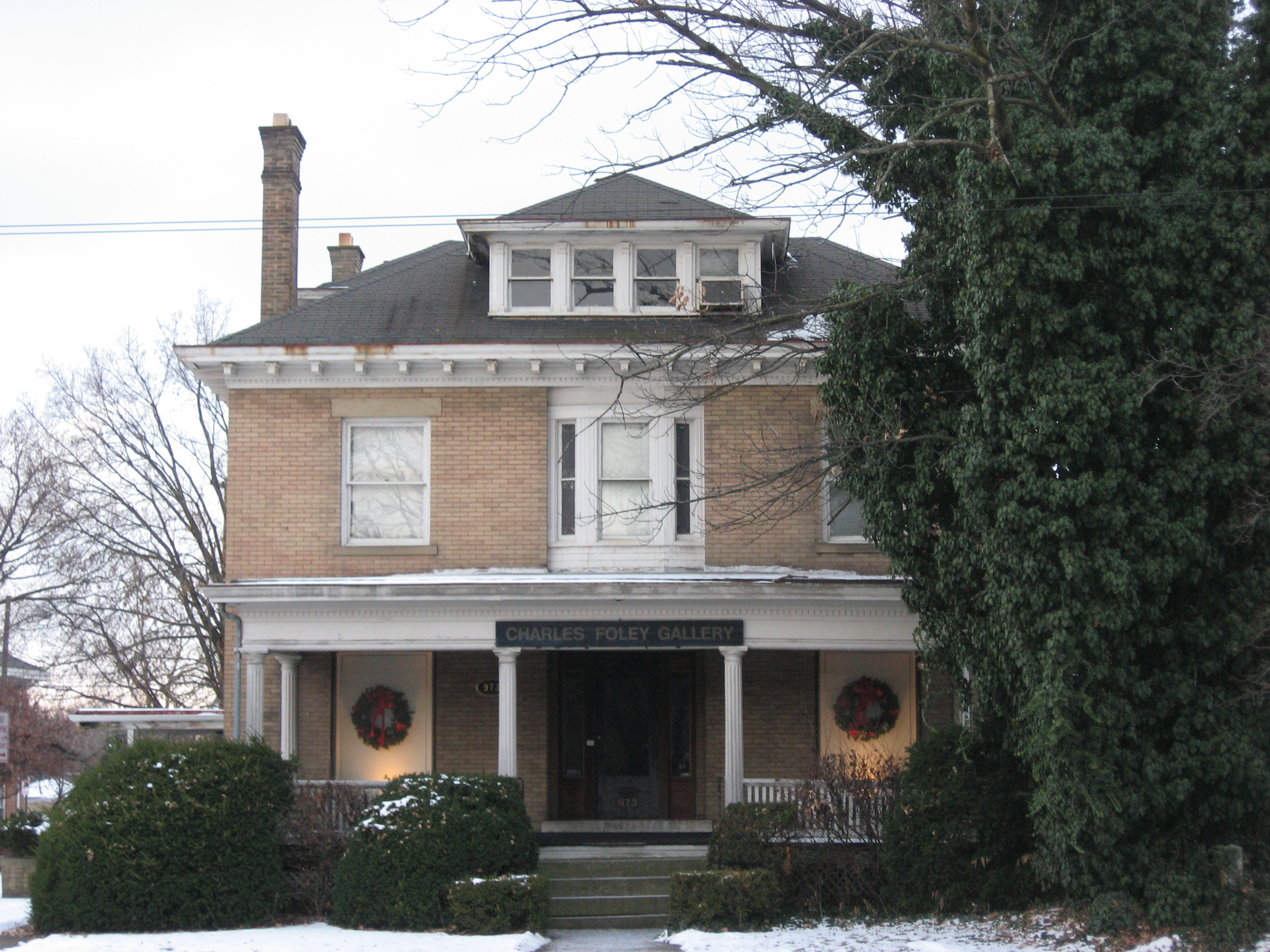
Heyne-Zimmerman House

== See also ==
- 21st & E. Broad Historic Group
- National Register of Historic Places listings in Columbus, Ohio
