= Shedd-Dunn House =

Historic house in Ohio, United States

- U.S. National Register of Historic Places
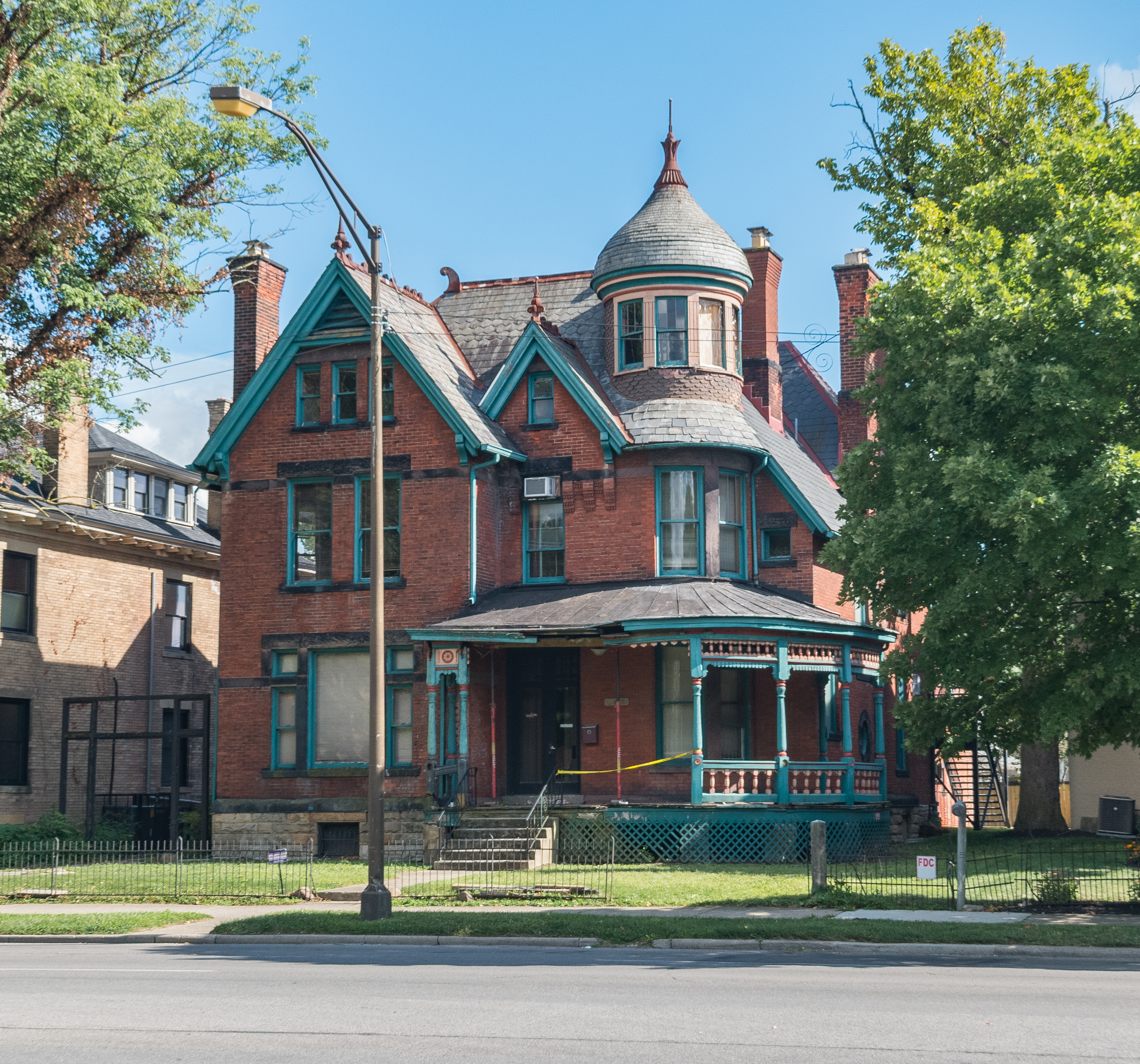
- Interactive map highlighting the building's location
- Location: 965 E. Broad St., Columbus, Ohio
- Coordinates: 39.964904°N 82.974852°W
- Built: 1888
- Architectural style: Queen Anne
- MPS: East Broad Street MRA
- NRHP reference No.: 86003445
- Added to NRHP: December 17, 1986

The Shedd-Dunn House is a historic house in Columbus, Ohio, United States. The house was built in 1888 and was listed on the National Register of Historic Places in 1986. The Shedd-Dunn House was built at a time when East Broad Street was a tree-lined avenue featuring the most ornate houses in Columbus; the house reflects the character of the area at the time. The building is also part of the 18th & E. Broad Historic District on the Columbus Register of Historic Properties, added to the register in 1988.

The house was built for the Shedd family, who operated an early wholesale grocery. The family lived there until 1912; Eggleston Dunn of the Dunn-Taft Dry Goods Co. subsequently lived there until the early 1940s. The house then became used for commercial purposes, including office space for the architects Tibbals, Crumley and Musson.

== See also ==
- National Register of Historic Places listings in Columbus, Ohio
