= Cambridge Arms =

- U.S. National Register of Historic Places
- Columbus Register of Historic Properties
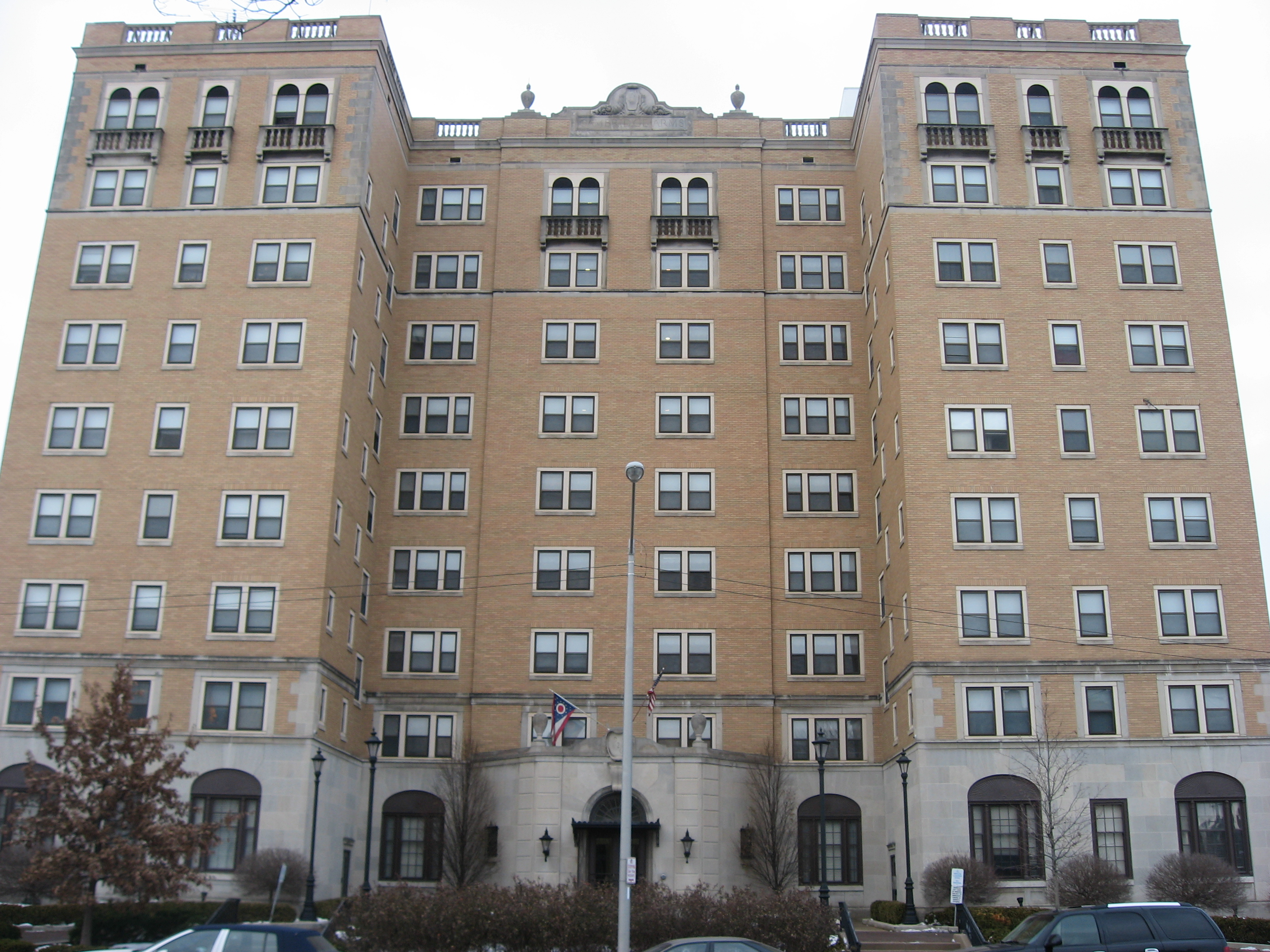
- Exterior in 2010
- Interactive map highlighting the building's location
- Location: 926 E. Broad St., Columbus, Ohio
- Coordinates: 39.965391°N 82.976114°W
- Built: 1928
- Part of: 18th & E. Broad Historic District, CR-49
- MPS: East Broad Street MRA
- NRHP reference No.: 86003412

Significant dates
- Added to NRHP: December 18, 2003
- Designated CRHP: March 15, 1988

Cambridge Arms is a historic building in Columbus, Ohio. It was listed as part of the E. Broad St. Multiple Resources Area on the National Register of Historic Places in 1986, removed in 1987 due to owner objection, and re-added in 2003. The building is part of the 18th & E. Broad Historic District on the Columbus Register of Historic Properties, added to the register in 1988.

== See also ==
- National Register of Historic Places listings in Columbus, Ohio
