= Scofield-Sanor House =

Historic house in Ohio, United States

- U.S. National Register of Historic Places
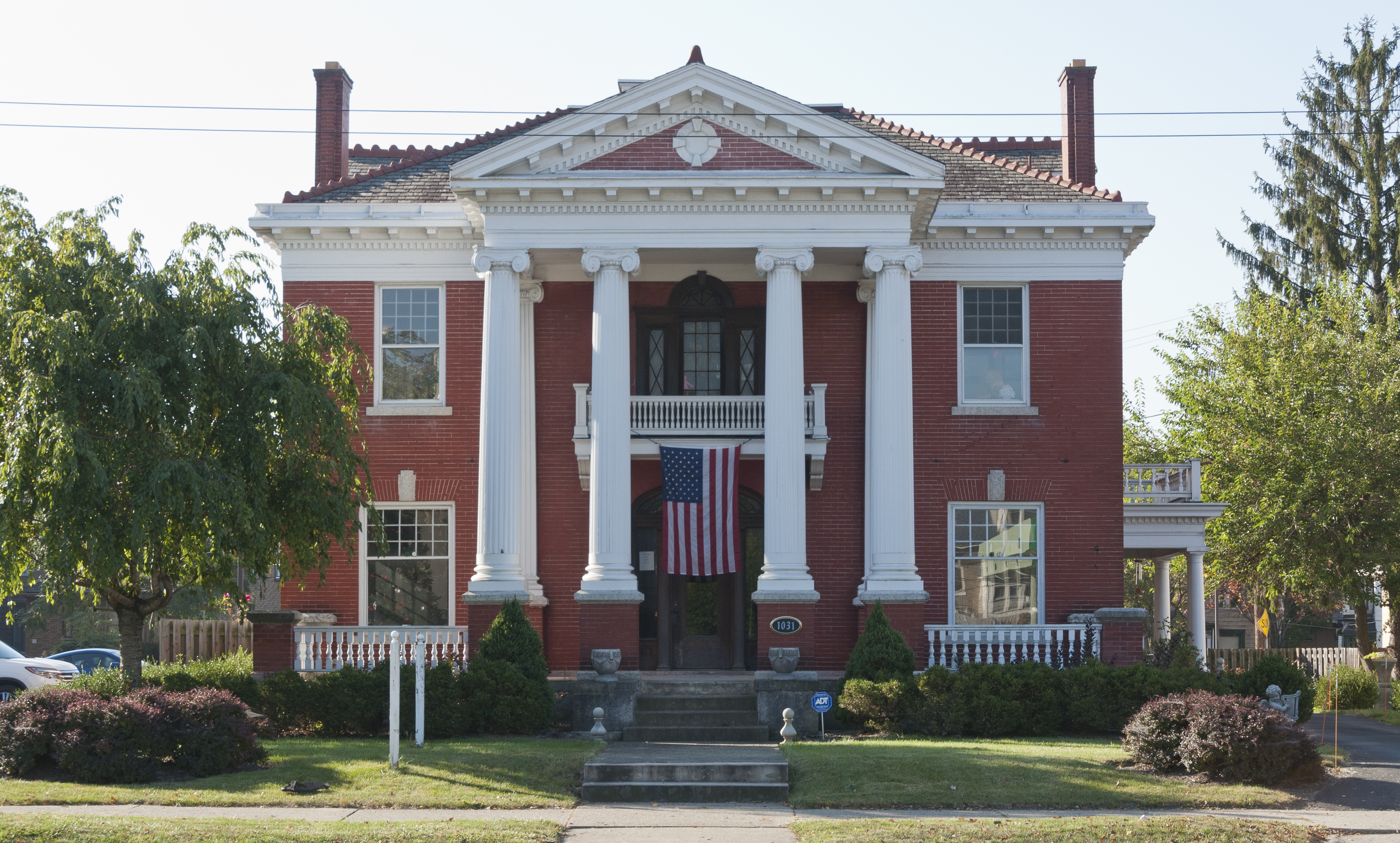
- Interactive map highlighting the building's location
- Location: 1031 E. Broad St., Columbus, Ohio
- Coordinates: 39.96506°N 82.97316°W
- Built: 1899
- Architectural style: Neoclassical
- MPS: East Broad Street MRA
- NRHP reference No.: 86003447
- Added to NRHP: December 17, 1986

The Scofield-Sanor House is a historic house in Columbus, Ohio, United States. The house was built in 1899 and was listed on the National Register of Historic Places in 1986. The Scofield-Sanor House was built at a time when East Broad Street was a tree-lined avenue featuring the most ornate houses in Columbus; the house reflects the character of the area at the time. The building is also part of the 21st & E. Broad Historic Group on the Columbus Register of Historic Properties, added to the register in 1988.

Lovett T. Scofield, president of the Andrus-Scofield Company, lived in the house from 1910 to 1914. Daniel G. Sanor lived there later on, from 1918 to 1931. Gertrude Starr was a subsequent resident, renting several rooms. The Ohio State Grange acquired the property in 1950, and has used it as its headquarters since then.

== See also ==
- National Register of Historic Places listings in Columbus, Ohio
