= Sharp-Page House =

Historic house in Ohio, United States

- U.S. National Register of Historic Places
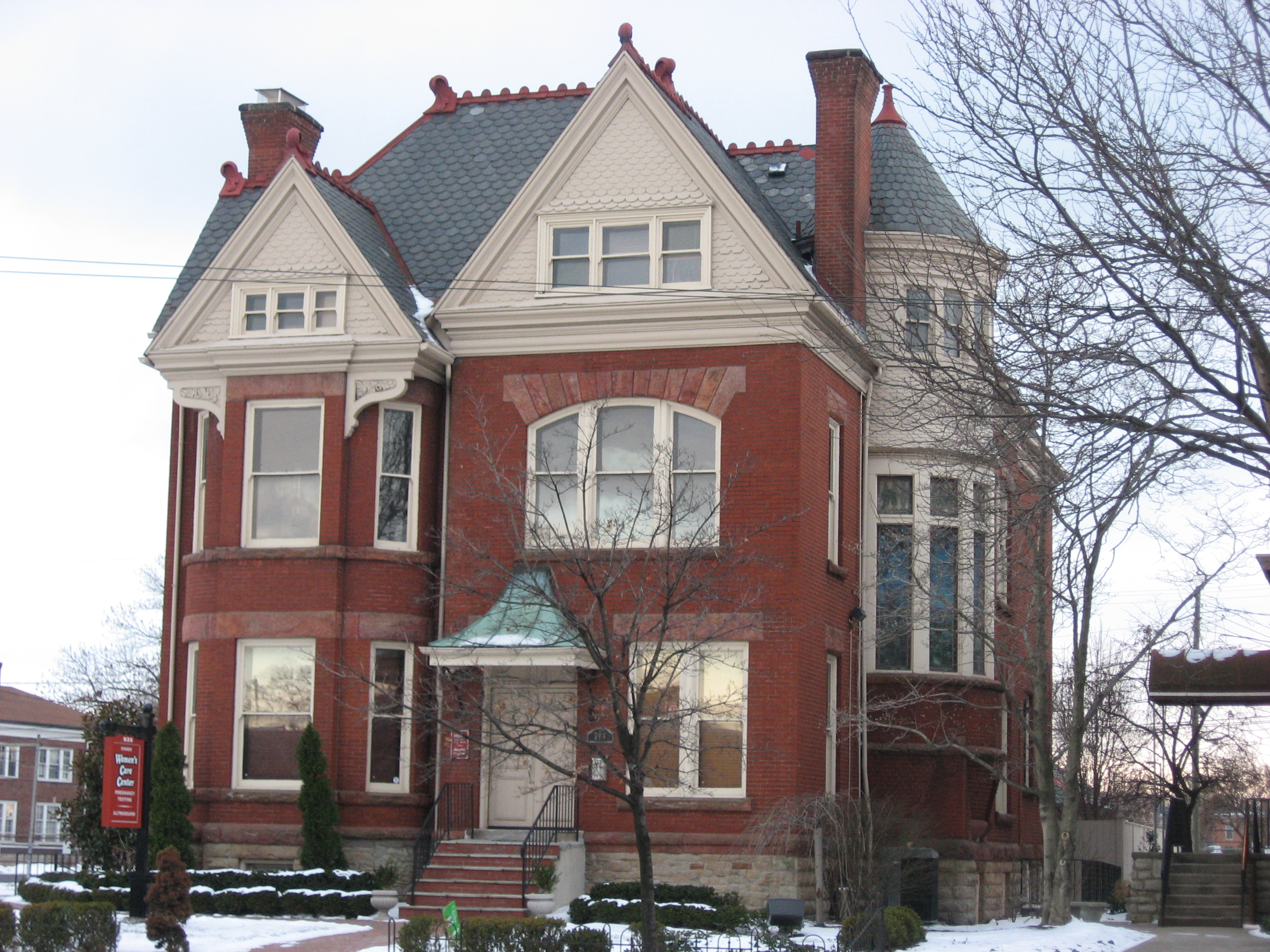
- Interactive map highlighting the building's location
- Location: 935 E. Broad St., Columbus, Ohio
- Coordinates: 39.964795°N 82.975694°W
- Built: c. 1889
- Architectural style: Queen Anne
- MPS: East Broad Street MRA
- NRHP reference No.: 86003440
- Added to NRHP: December 17, 1986

The Sharp-Page House is a historic house in Columbus, Ohio, United States. The house was built c. 1889 and was listed on the National Register of Historic Places in 1986. The Sharp-Page House was built during a period when East Broad Street was a tree-lined avenue adorned with some of Columbus’s most ornate homes, and it reflects the character of the neighborhood during that time. The building is also part of the 18th & E. Broad Historic District on the Columbus Register of Historic Properties, added to the register in 1988.

== See also ==
- National Register of Historic Places listings in Columbus, Ohio
