= Broad Street Christian Church =

- U.S. National Register of Historic Places
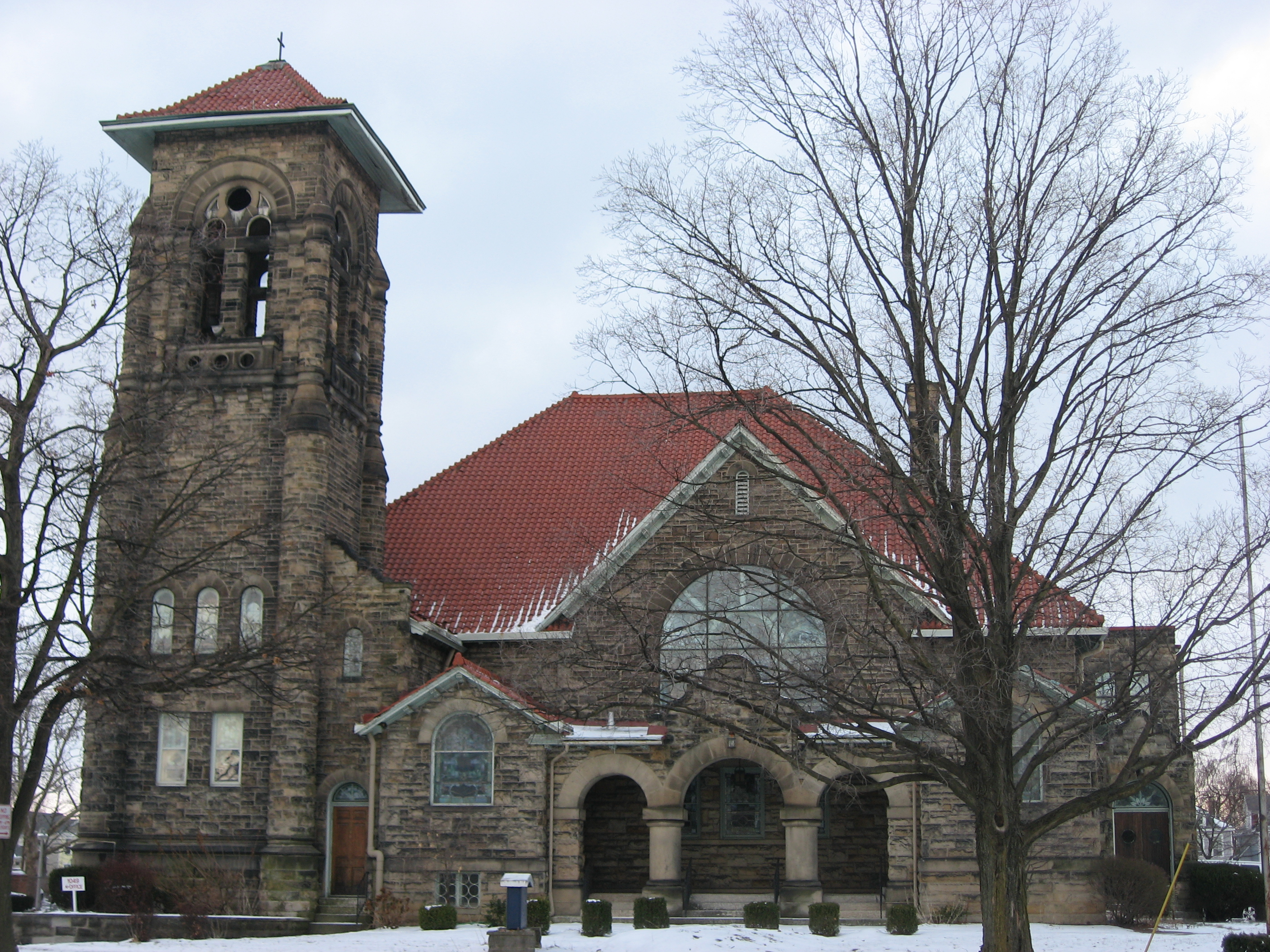
- Front of the church
- Interactive map highlighting the church's location
- Location: 1051 E. Broad St., Columbus, Ohio
- Coordinates: 39°57′54″N 82°58′22″W
- Area: Less than 1 acre (0.40 ha)
- Built: 1907
- Architect: Wilbur T. Mills
- Architectural style: Mission/Spanish Revival, Arts & Crafts
- MPS: East Broad Street MRA
- NRHP reference No.: 86003448
- Added to NRHP: December 16, 1986

Broad Street Christian Church is a historic church building on the near east side of Columbus, Ohio, United States. The edifice was constructed in an exclusive residential neighborhood at the beginning of the twentieth century, and it has been designated a historic site. It was home for most of its history to a Disciples of Christ congregation, and is now the seat of an Ethiopian Orthodox congregation.

== History ==
In 1870, some of the city's New Lights formed a church that soon built a building downtown on Gay Street at Third Street. This building remained in use for approximately thirty-five years, acquiring the nickname of "Old Central", before its replacement by the present structure in 1907. The congregation employed Columbus architect Wilbur T. Mills to design its new building on E. Broad Street, which by the late nineteenth century had become the city's premier wealthy neighborhood. Here the congregation remained until the end of 2009, when it closed; members last worshipped together on December 27, after which many of the contents were removed and the building sold to a parish of the Ethiopian Orthodox Tewahedo Church.

== Architecture ==
The church is primarily a stone building: walls, foundation, and smaller elements are all stone, although terracotta tiles cover the roof. Rather than ashlar, the stone blocks of the walls are rough-hewn, and only the trim is smoothed. The overall appearance is that of the Arts and Crafts movement; besides the rough-hewn stonework, the style is displayed through elements such as the bracketed shelters over the entrances and the eaves over the edges of the building. Other major components include a square corner tower with a hip roof, round turrets on the other corners, short but thick Tuscan columns, rounded arch windows of stained glass, and an arcade sheltering the main entrance. Overall, the two-story building possesses a rectangular floor plan.

== Historic site ==
In 1986, the Broad Street Christian Church was listed on the National Register of Historic Places, qualifying both because of its architecture and because of its place in the community's history. A historic district and twenty-three other buildings, including the nearby East Broad Street Presbyterian Church and Saint Paul's Episcopal Church, were listed with it as part of a multiple property submission of significant buildings on East Broad Street.

The property is also part of the 21st & E. Broad Historic Group of the Columbus Register of Historic Properties.

== See also ==
- National Register of Historic Places listings in Columbus, Ohio
