= Heyne-Zimmerman House =

Historic house in Ohio, United States

- U.S. National Register of Historic Places
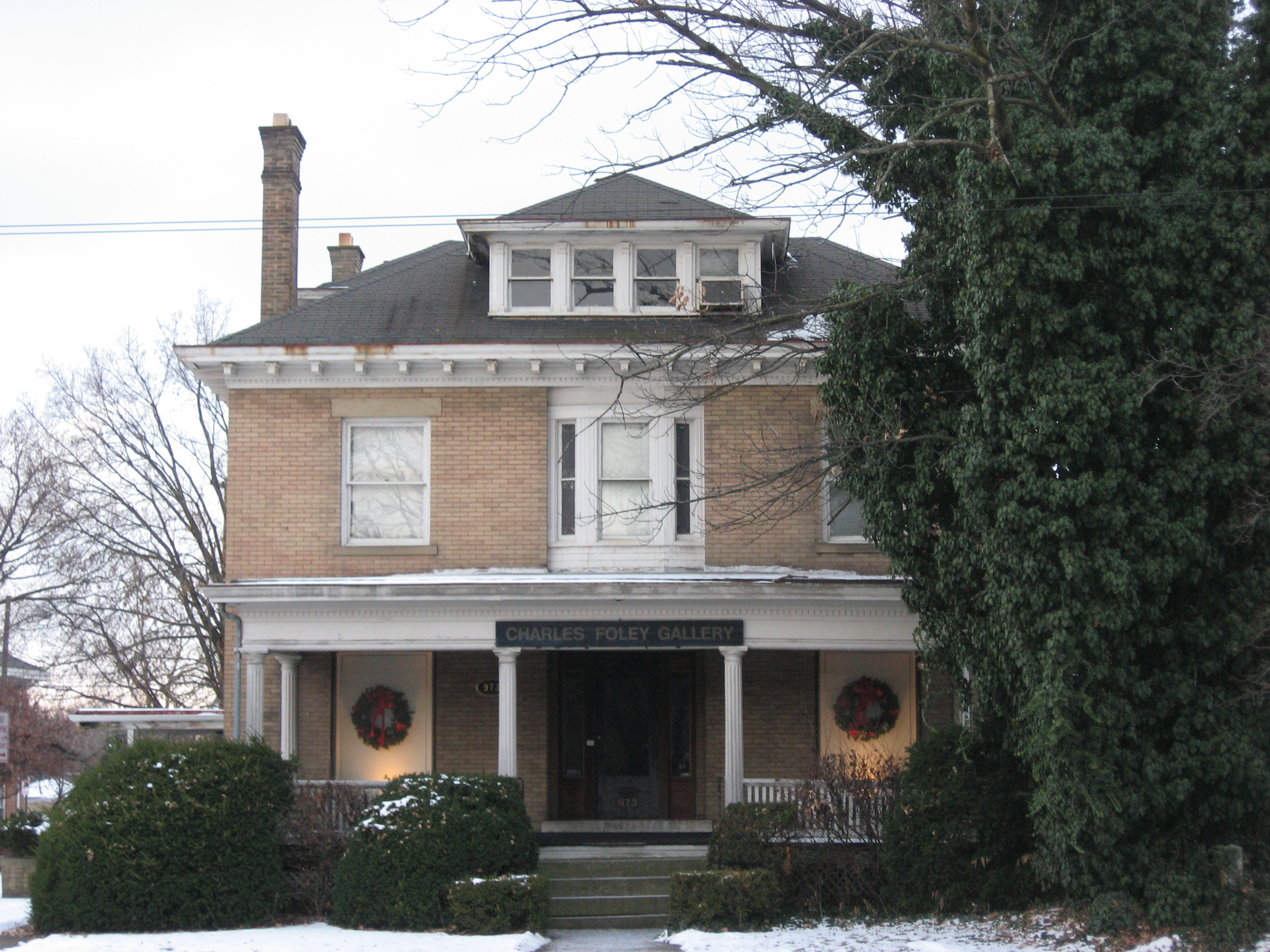
- Interactive map highlighting the building's location
- Location: 973 E. Broad St., Columbus, Ohio
- Coordinates: 39.964944°N 82.974688°W
- Built: c. 1912
- Architectural style: Colonial Revival
- MPS: East Broad Street MRA
- NRHP reference No.: 86003450
- Added to NRHP: March 17, 1987

The Heyne-Zimmerman House is a historic house in Columbus, Ohio, United States. The house was built c. 1912 and was listed on the National Register of Historic Places in 1987. The Heyne-Zimmerman House was built at a time when East Broad Street was a tree-lined avenue featuring the most ornate houses in Columbus; the house reflects the character of the area at the time. The building is also part of the 18th & E. Broad Historic District on the Columbus Register of Historic Properties, added to the register in 1988.

The building was home to Carl G. Heyne, president of the American Cash Register Manufacturing Company, from 1912 to 1914. Charles Zimmerman, manager of Ohio Auto Sales, lived there with his wife from 1918 to the early 1930s. After his death, she continued living there into the early 1940s.

== See also ==
- National Register of Historic Places listings in Columbus, Ohio
