= Alice E. Heckler Peters =

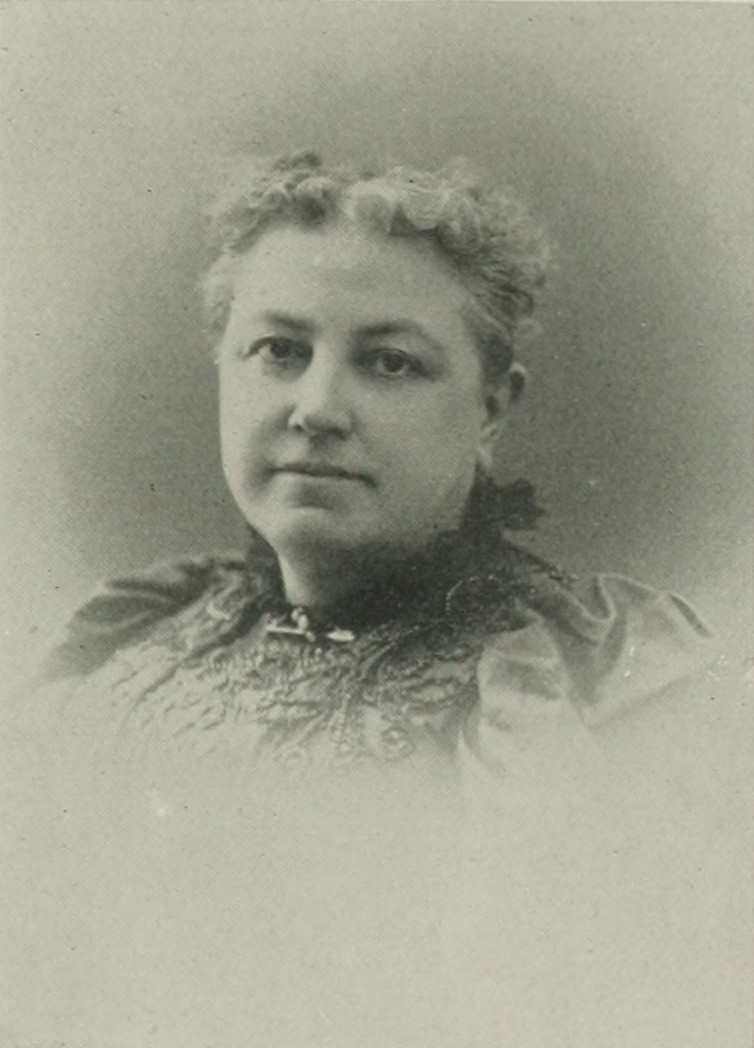
- "A Woman of the Century"
- Born: Alice E. Heckler; March 13, 1845; Dayton, Ohio, U.S.
- Died: April 11, 1921 (aged 76)
- Burial place: Green Lawn Cemetery, Columbus, U.S.
- Education: Chautauqua
- Occupations: social reformer; educator; writer; poet
- Organizations: Woman's Christian Temperance Union; Woman's Foreign Missionary Society of the Methodist Episcopal Church; National American Woman Suffrage Association; Woman's Relief Corps
- Spouse: Oscar G. Peters (m. 1863; died 1894)
- Children: 2

Alice E. Heckler Peters (March 13, 1845 – April 11, 1921) was an American social reformer, educator, writer, and poet. She was involved in several women's religious, reform and social organizations of her era including the Woman's Christian Temperance Union (WCTU), Woman's Foreign Missionary Society of the Methodist Episcopal Church, National American Woman Suffrage Association, and the Woman's Relief Corps. Her poetry was a valuable addition to American literature.

== Early life and education ==
Alice E. Heckler was born in Dayton, Ohio, March 13, 1845. Her father, Lewis Heckler (1822–1852), was an enterprising and successful man of business. From the time of his death, life was difficult for Alice. When she was fourteen, the family removed to Columbus, Ohio, and Alice undertook the task of providing financial support to the family. Inexperienced and without previous training, she found few occupations open to girls, but being desperate, she managed to find some work with the use of a sewing machine. In this way, she struggled for four years.

Deprived of a textbook education, and there being no public library nearby, Alice often stayed up late, reading her Bible and books from the Sunday school. Biographies of the Wesleys and Fletchers made a deep impression on her.

After marriage, she took a four-year Chautauqua course at home, graduating in 1887 with nine seals on her diploma.

== Career ==
On May 21, 1863, at Franklin County, Ohio, she married Oscar G. Peters. Mr. Peters was then chief clerk in the Commissary Department. While her husband was stationed in Cleveland, Mrs. Peters took an active interest in the Sanitary Commission, making garments and scraping lint.

Arriving at Fort Leavenworth, Mr. Peters found that no provision had been made for quarters for himself and his wife, so they boarded at the hotel in the town for a time, and he rode back and forth to his work daily. Later, they made arrangements to stay in a house of five rooms, which was occupied by the second clerk. There were 16 people already living in the crowded quarters, but they remained for five weeks, at the end of which time, two rooms were partitioned off from the warehouse where the bacon was stored for the army. Mrs. Peters noticed that there was a large waste of grease from the bacon, and she conceived the idea of saving it. She did this and enough was obtained from its sale to pay the expenses of the office. When the government noticed the decrease in the expenses at that station and learned that it was due to Mrs. Peters' idea, the government, recognizing her ability, employed her to copy all the contracts from the station at a salary of US$50 per month. Not only did she become an influential factor in the business department of government service there, but she did a work of incalculable benefit in the religious training of the neglected children of the fort. There was one Episcopal church, but no place for the children. Feeling that they should have religious instruction, Mrs. Peters organized a Sunday school which 150 students attended.

Returning to Columbus in 1866, Mr. Peters engaged in the grocery business for ten years. A daughter was born in 1868, but died in 1869. A year later, their only son was born.

For many years, Peters taught private classes. She was also a regular newspaper contributor, and a poet.

Peters was involved in several women's religious, reform and social movements of her era. In 1873, Mrs. Peters had her sister-in-law babysit her child each day so that she could devote herself to the Women's Crusade for eleven weeks, speaking and praying in saloons and on the street. Through her writing, she contributed to furthering the WCTU movement since its inception; she also served as the organization's secretary. Identifying herself with the Methodist Episcopal Church at the age of fifteenth, Peters became a charter member of both home and foreign missionary societies. She was active in the woman suffrage cause in Ohio, by delivering lectures on the subject and also by becoming a member of the National American Woman Suffrage Association executive board. For seven years, she put effort into the work of the Woman's Relief Corps, also serving as its secretary.

Through journalistic writing and poems, Peters voiced the philanthropic and reform methods she advocated. Mr. Peters with his brother and a friend organized the Columbus Buggy Company, a large manufacturing concern, which gained an international reputation, and made it possible for Mr. and Mrs. Peters to further their philanthropic endeavors.

== Death ==
Alice E. Heckler Peters died April 11, 1921, and was buried at the Green Lawn Cemetery, Columbus.
