= Lester Eubanks =

American fugitive (born 1943)

- Born: October 31, 1943 (age 82)
- Disappeared: 1973
- Status: Fugitive
- Other names: Victor Young; Pete Eubanks; Lester William Eubanks
- Conviction: First degree murder
- Penalty: Death; commuted to life imprisonment

Lester Eubanks (born October 31, 1943) is an American criminal and fugitive who murdered 14-year-old Mary Ellen Deener on November 14, 1965, in Mansfield, Ohio. He was sentenced to death, commuted in 1972 to life in prison. He escaped from Ohio State Penitentiary in 1973 and has been at large ever since. After not returning from a furlough, he moved to California, where he was known as Victor Young. He is on the United States Marshals Service's 15 Most Wanted Fugitives list.

== Personal life ==
Eubanks was born on October 31, 1943. He lived in Mansfield, Ohio. By 1965, Eubanks was a "serial sexual offender". He had been arrested twice before for sex crimes. In November 1965, Eubanks was out on bond for a rape charge. Eubanks is 5'11", weighs 175 pounds, and has black hair and brown eyes. He has a large scar on his upper right arm.

== Murder of Mary Ellen Deener ==
On November 14, 1965, Mary Ellen Deener, a 14-year-old girl who was a resident of Mansfield, left home to do laundry at a local laundromat near her grandmother’s home. She left the laundromat to get change from another nearby laundromat. While she was walking from the one laundromat to the other, Eubanks grabbed her, pulled her behind a house and attempted to sexually assault her. She resisted, and Eubanks shot her twice in the stomach. Eubanks left her and went back home to clean and dress himself. He returned 20 minutes later and saw she was still breathing. He picked up a brick and struck her in the head, killing her. Police found her body two hours later.

The next day, Eubanks was arrested at his home, where he confessed to the murder. He was charged with first degree murder while attempting to commit rape.

== Imprisonment ==
The case went to trial in 1966. Eubanks testified to his involvement in the crime. In May 1966, a jury convicted of Eubanks first degree murder and declined to recommend mercy. Eubanks was sentenced to death by electrocution and sent to death row at the Ohio Penitentiary in Columbus. In 1972, his sentence was commuted to life in prison as a result of Furman v. Georgia.

Eubanks twice came within days of execution. On April 17, 1968, Governor Jim Rhodes granted a stay of execution to Eubanks, who was scheduled to on April 19, upon the recommendation of the Ohio Parole Board. The board wanted psychiatric tests done on Eubanks to determine whether or not he was sane. That November, Eubanks was granted a new hearing to determine whether his rights had been violated. In January 1970, he was granted an indefinite reprieve by the Supreme Court of Ohio.

Eubanks was given letters of recommendation by prison guards to join an "honor inmate" program that took inmates outside of the prison. Eubanks spent his time in prison painting and received some awards for his work. In the months leading up to December 1973, the number of visitations to Eubanks in prison drastically increased.

=== Escape ===
Eubanks, as a part of the honor inmate program, was given a temporary furlough to go outside to do Christmas shopping on December 7, 1973. He and three other inmates were brought to the Great Southern Shopping Mall in south Columbus, where he was given the opportunity to roam the mall unescorted, with the only stipulation to arrive back to the officers at the appropriate time. He was dropped off at the mall at 10 a.m., and upon entering the mall, the inmates split up. When the visiting time was up, the Ohio Department of Corrections' security team went to collect Eubanks, who was missing. Investigators say he was picked up by a close associate, who drove him to the Detroit, Michigan area, where he lived for two weeks, and that he got on a bus to California afterwards. He was almost caught when the bus was stopped on an interstate line by officers looking to see if illegal substances were being trafficked.

== Aftermath ==
Starting in 1975, Eubanks lived with a woman named Kay Banks in Los Angeles, California, under the name Victor Young. He signed his paintings under this name. At various times, he lived in the Los Angeles neighborhoods of Gardena, North Hollywood, Long Beach, and South Los Angeles. In the 1980s, he worked at a waterbed manufacturing factory in Gardena. In the 1980s or early 1990s, he worked as a janitor at St. Francis Hospital in Lynwood, California.

In the early 1990s, it was discovered that the federal warrant for Eubanks had been removed from the federal warrant database, which explained how he could live for two decades without getting caught.

In 1994, Eubanks was the subject of an episode of America's Most Wanted, and Los Angeles police received thousands of tips. After watching the show, Kay Banks gave the police a tip that she had been living with him for years. When police interrogated her, she confessed to living with him, and said he lived with her up until a few years prior. She said Eubanks was a "bully", so she told him someone was looking into him, which caused him to leave.

Eubanks lived in Alabama at some point before 2003. He worked as a janitor at a center for troubled youths.

In 2003, investigators talked to his father, Mose L. Eubanks, in Ohio, who refused to talk about his son. Mose Eubanks took phone calls from Lester and likely knew about his whereabouts. Lester Eubanks travelled back to Ohio in 2003, 2010, and 2012 to attend funerals for family members. Mose Eubanks died in 2012.

In 2018, Eubanks was listed on the United States Marshals Service's 15 Most Wanted Fugitives list. As of 2025, he still remains on the list. The Marshals Service is offering a reward of up to $50,000 for information that leads to his capture.

In 2019, a man came forward with a claim that his late mother had been raped by Eubanks, that he is Eubanks' biological son by rape, and that he was willing to provide his DNA to help with the search. However, FBI policies prohibit using a relative's DNA in their DNA database.

His disappearance was featured on the Netflix series Unsolved Mysteries. After Eubanks was featured on the series, the U.S. Marshals said they believed he was still living in the Los Angeles area, having received photographs of him with friends there.

== See also ==
- List of fugitives from justice who disappeared
