= Columbus Buggy Company =

American automobile manufacturer

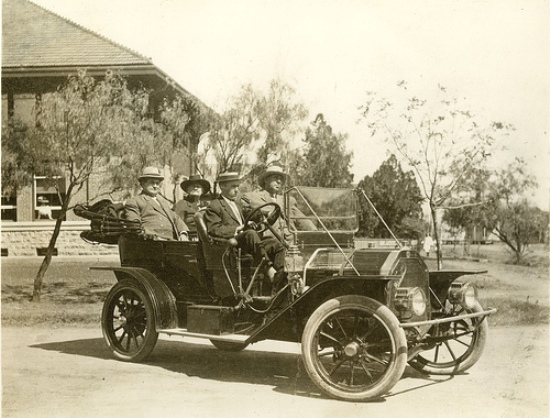
- A later model Columbus-Firestone automobile in 1909
- Type: Buggy and automobile producer
- Industry: Automotive manufacturing
- Predecessor: Iron Buggy Co.
- Founded: 1875 in Columbus, Ohio
- Defunct: 1913
- Fate: Declared bankruptcy
- Headquarters: Columbus, Ohio, United States
- Key people: Clinton D. Firestone, George Peters and Oscar Glaze Peters
- Products: Buggies, automobiles
- Revenue: $2 million (1892)
- Number of employees: 1,200 (1892)

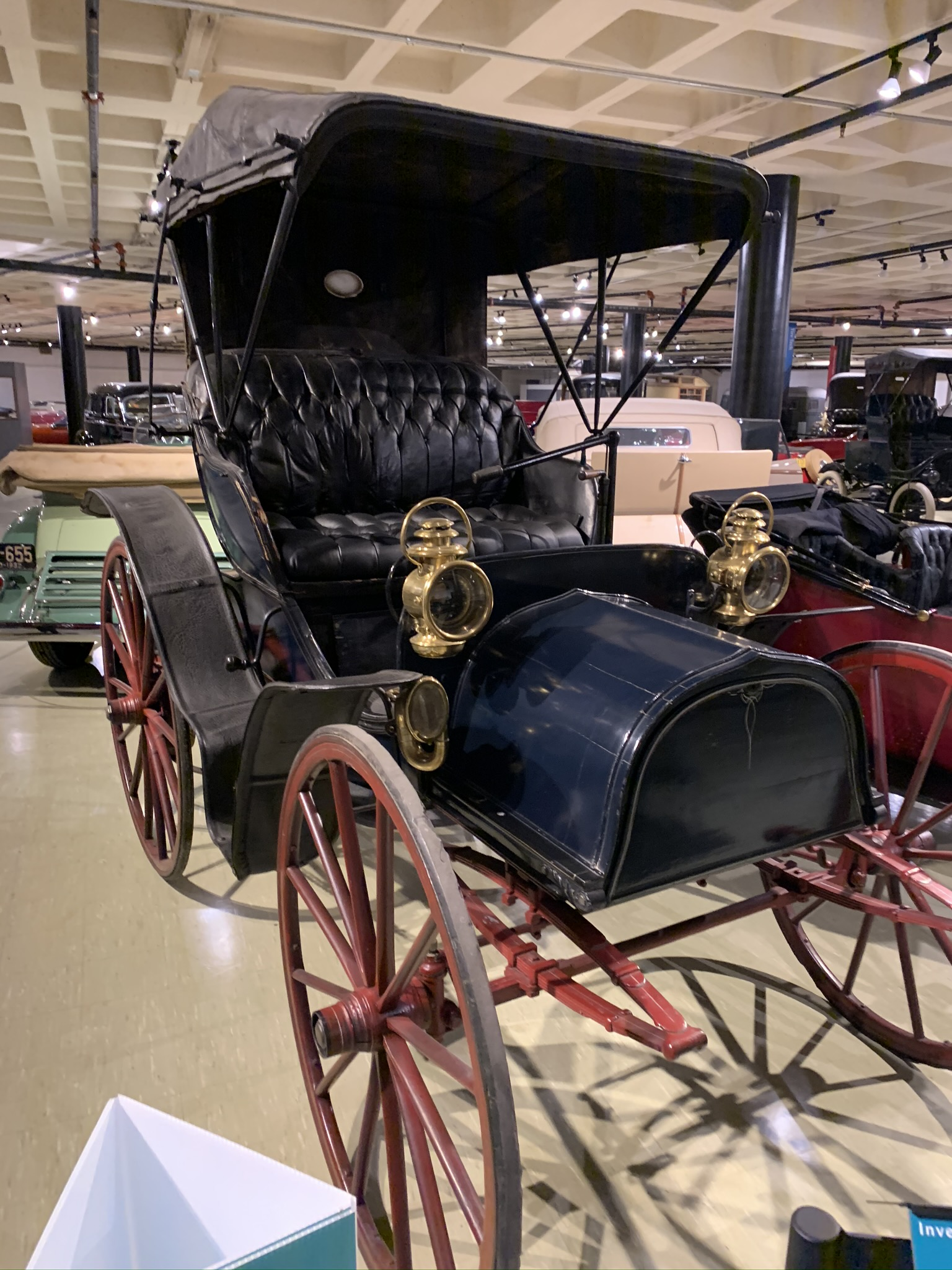
1908 Columbus at the Crawford Museum

The Columbus Buggy Company was an early buggy and automotive manufacturer based in Columbus, Ohio, United States, from 1875 to 1913.

Begun by three business partners, the company set up its manufacturing facilities in what is today the Arena District producing inexpensive buggies and dashboards, and quickly saw success. At its height it employed 1,200 people and was producing 100 buggies a day which were sold in every state in the United States. The company was one of the city's major employers and a significant portion of the city's buggy manufacturing economy. After the turn of the century it oriented itself toward production of electric vehicles and, later, of automobiles. Crippled by the Great Flood of 1913 and unable to compete with cheaper alternatives like the Model T, the company eventually went bankrupt in 1913, reorganized, and closed its doors a few years later.

It influenced the early automobile industry production methods and several notable employees, including Eddie Rickenbacker and Harvey S. Firestone. The company buildings, after some time empty, have since been re-developed as office space in the Arena District.

== History ==
=== Origin ===
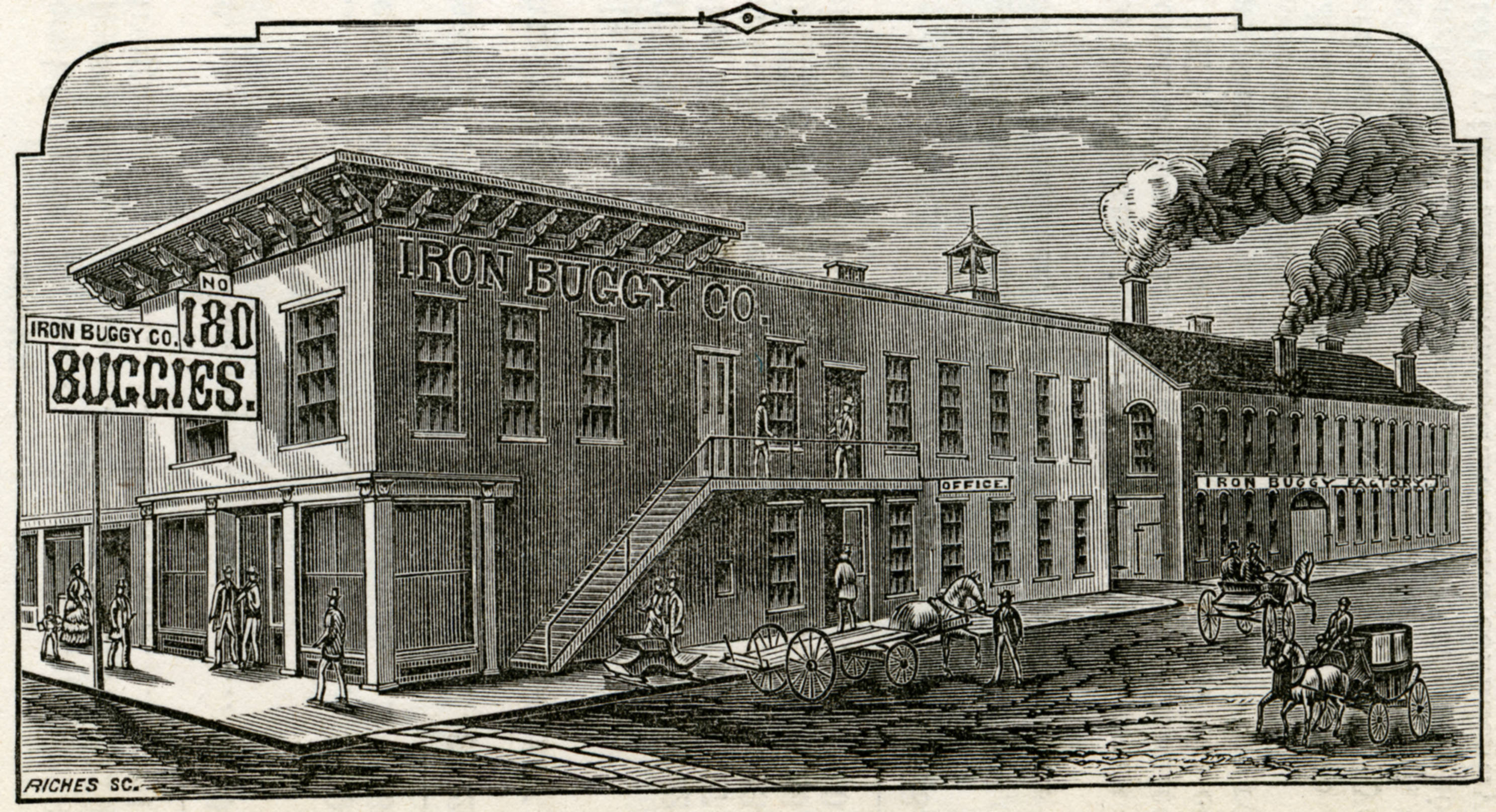
First home of the Iron Buggy Co., the predecessor of the Columbus Buggy Co., at 180 N. High St. in Columbus

The Columbus Buggy Company was established by entrepreneur Clinton D. Firestone and brothers George and Oscar Peters. The three partners saw Columbus, Ohio as a ripe location for a business thanks to cheap labor as well as the recent network of railroads created during the American Civil War reducing the costs of goods. The completion of the Hocking Valley Railway also granted them ample access to coal, wood and iron from southeast Ohio.

Before starting the company, the Peters brothers had worked in the leather trade, but had developed a process to produce cheap buggies for close to $150 apiece, using wood obtained from a company near the Ohio Penitentiary and building using a specialized manufacturing system. Before 1870 they produced 100 and sold them successfully at auction, though their business partners refused further work, leaving them in debt. (Note: George Peters is also known to have apprenticed at another Columbus buggy producer. E. & H. F. Booth at Fourth and Gay streets, in 1856 for $3 per week. His father, Tunis Peters, owned a large tanyard, Peters Run, in Columbus where he learned the business and later went into work building houses in Chillicothe, Ohio before many of them burned in a fire in 1845. A subsequent trunk manufacturing business is believed to be where Peters developed manufacturing skills that would lead to the success of Columbus Buggy Co.) In 1870, they were introduced to Firestone, a native of Canton, Ohio and who had operated a railroad business in Cedar Rapids, Iowa, moved to Columbus and financed the business with $5,000. Their first venture, Iron Buggy Company, launched in 1870 in a shanty built for $100, at 180 North High Street and focused it on selling cheap buggies. The business saw immediate success thanks to a design created by the Peters brothers and a system of labor that made production efficient, and it sold 237 buggies in its first year. The building it was housed in burnt down on May 27, 1874, and was rebuilt. In 1875 its owners sold the business to another buggy producer, H. K. Tuller of Buckeye Buggy Company.

=== Success ===
In 1875, the three formed the Columbus Buggy Company and Peters Dash Company, with $20,000 in capital. Its first facility was locating at Wall and Locust streets near the modern day One Nationwide Plaza building in the Arena District, immediately north of downtown Columbus, and near the Ohio Penitentiary and Union Station. His business specialized in making buggies that were affordable to people at all price ranges as well as dashboards, carriage fenders, washes and straps for carriage dealers and manufacturers. The company quickly saw success, drawing $50,000 in revenue in its first year, but sales quickly grew. By 1878 it had 250 employees and was making 100 buggies a week.

In 1883, the company had 1,000 employees and was producing 25,000 buggies a year. That year it was struck with a patent infringement lawsuit from Timken Company, alleging the company had stolen the idea for an "automatic" spring part used in its carriages, and seeking $50,000 in damages. Columbus Buggy Co. filed a countersuit and the two businesses traded barbs in trade publications for two months before the courts decided in Studebaker's favor in December 1884. Columbus Buggy Co. was obliged to pay $3,000 in damages, though it began to use Timken springs in models starting in 1886, and the Timken and Firestone families maintained a friendly relationship during and after the litigation.

The company continued to add buildings as it continued to expand along High Street until it became the largest manufacturer of buggies in the world. By 1888 it occupied an entire city block between High Street and Wall Street. In 1890 it pledged $5,000 to the creation of a YMCA building in downtown Columbus. In the meantime, it began advertising its vehicles and dash products heavily in magazines.

At its height in 1892, the company employed 1,200 people and built 100 vehicles and 1,500 carriage dashboards a day, with its products exported to other countries around the world. Its revenue grew to $2 million a year on an active capital of about $1 million and about $300,000 a month in payroll. The company had a presence at the 1893 Chicago World's Fair, where it boasted that it had dealerships in every state and shipped overseas. By that year, though, its buggies, which sold for $110, were considered overpriced.

By 1900, about two dozen other buggy producers had formed around Columbus, with factories working day and night in the city, and an estimated one in six buggies in use around the world was built in Columbus. Some of these companies were older than Columbus Buggy Co, but the manufacturer remained one of the largest businesses in the city. Columbus Buggy Co. moved its production to a new plant at 400 Dublin Road in 1906 at Firestone's insistence.

=== Branching into automobiles ===
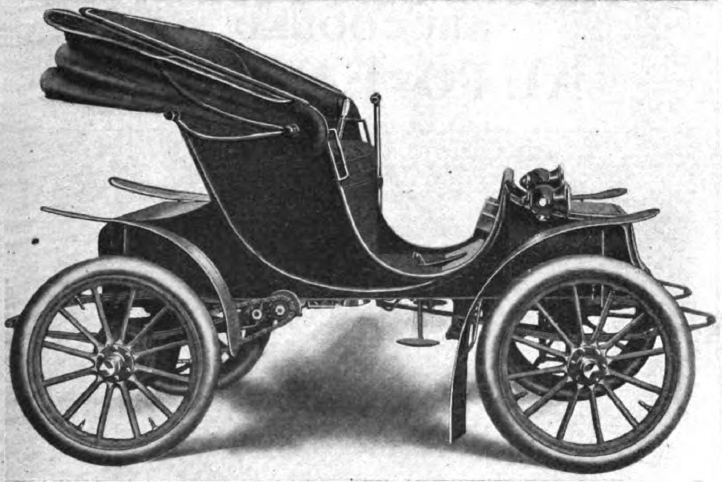
1906 Columbus Electric Automobile

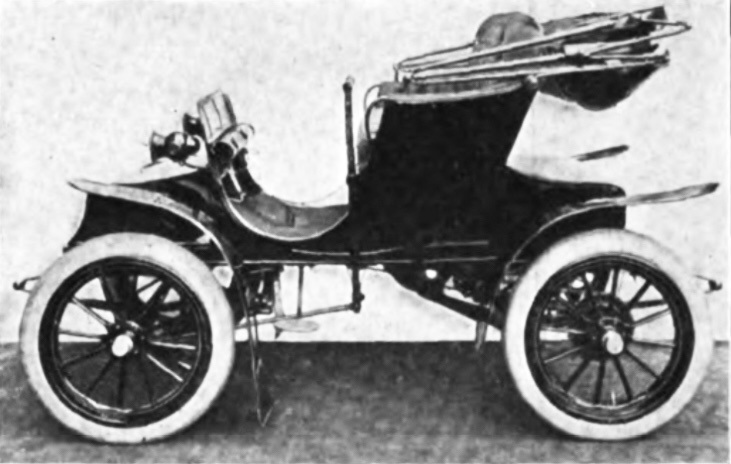
Columbus Model 1000 (1907)

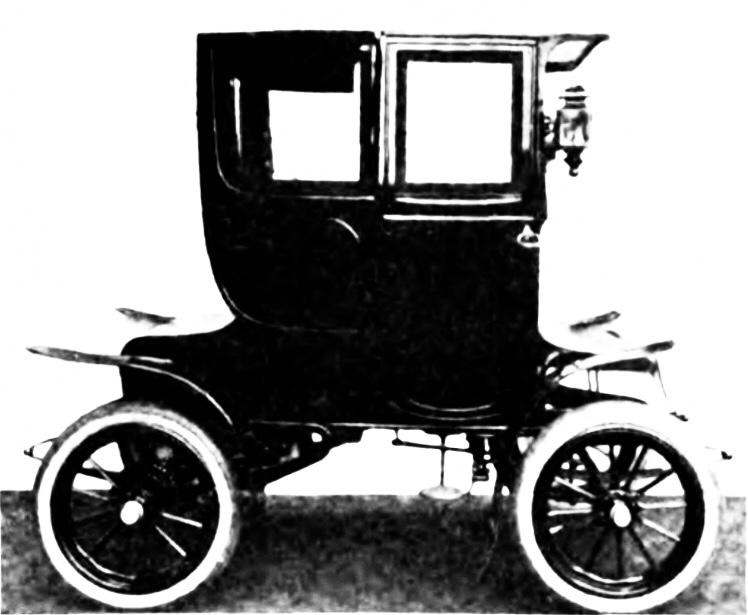
Columbus Model 1002 (1907)

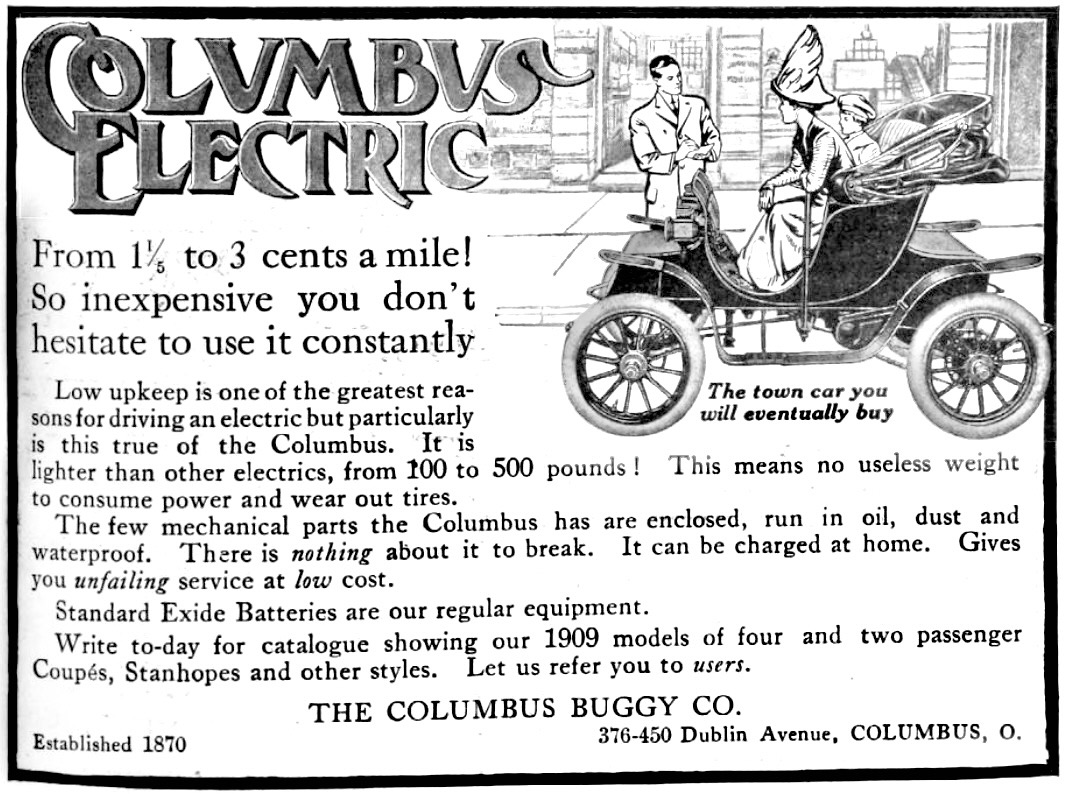
Columbus Buggy Company advertisement (1909)

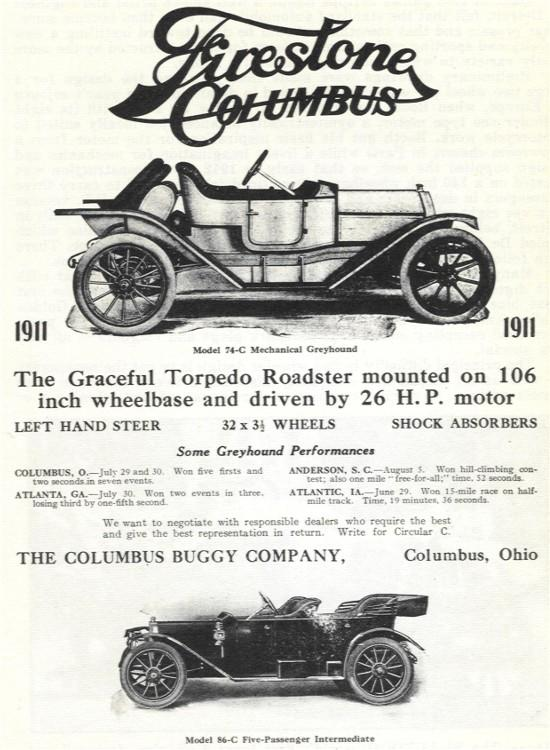
An advertisement for a 1911 "Mechanical Greyhound" automobile produced by Columbus Buggy Co.

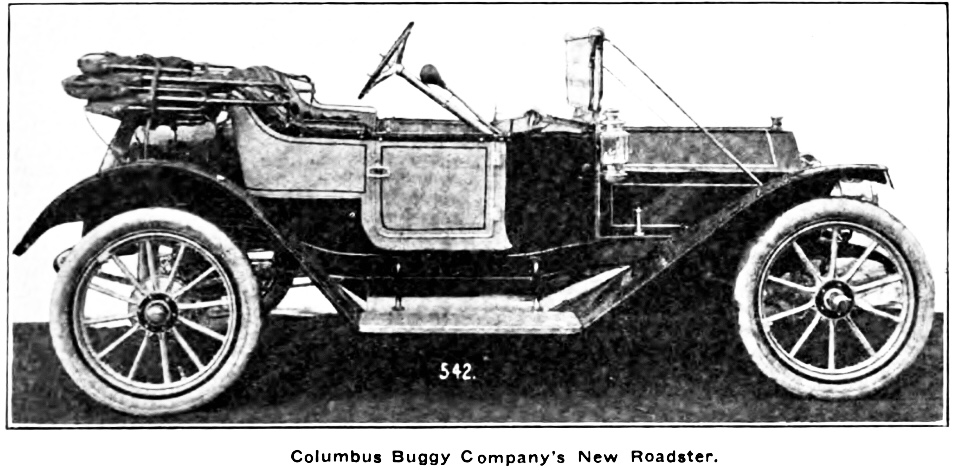
Columbus Buggy Company Roadster „Doctorˋs Special“ (1912)

With the advent of the automobile, Columbus Buggy Co. found itself at a competitive disadvantage to companies in Detroit, Cleveland and Chicago, which had a greater access to steel. In 1903, though, it opted to produce an electric vehicle to compete with these new and increasingly popular vehicles.

The 400 Dublin Road facility began producing its first electric coupe in 1903, the Columbus Electric Model No. 1000. This would be one of several models of electric vehicle the company produced in larger scale beginning in 1905. The company advertised the vehicles as easy to operate, targeting women, and that they were quiet. But the vehicles were limited by a top speed of 20 miles per hour (32 km/h), limited range and a need to recharge batteries for several hours. Powered by Willard batteries, this car sold for about $1,000. It produced several models including the No. 3003 Firestone Motor Buggy: a light motor buggy, which it also marketed to physicians as a medical phaeton, as well as the Columbus Station Wagon No. 1102, which was to be driven by a chauffeur while its passengers rode in an enclosed compartment. In 1907, it bought the Springfield Automotive Company of Springfield, Ohio which had been manufacturing the Bramwell, a gasoline powered automobile.

In 1909, the company hired Lee Frayer to design a full-sized car, with Eddie Rickenbacker as his assistant. The Firestone-Columbus, a gasoline-powered car geared toward families, began production in 1909. About 500 of the vehicles sold in the first year and it was generally well received in the market. Improvements were made to the vehicles continually as they were produced, as opposed to creating successive model years. There were a few different variations on the vehicle, including the model 76-A, an intermediate sized vehicle that could carry four passengers. The Columbus-Firestone was reported to be the first car with its steering wheel on the left side of the car.

Introduced at the 1909 Chicago Auto Show, it became popular and sold 2,000 units a year, all made at the 400 Dublin Road plant. By 1912 there were more cars of this brand than any other in Columbus and the company was producing 2,000 a year. But it also struggled to compete with cheaper competitors, notably the Ford Model T.

The company built a special racing buggy, the Red Wing, which it entered into the 1911 Indianapolis 500, designed by Frayer and Rickenbacker and driven by Frayer. Though the car didn't finish the race, it was credited with finishing 13th in the race. They subsequently entered a car into the 1912 Indianapolis 500, this time driven by Rickenbacker. It finished 21st.

=== Decline ===
The business was affected by the severe flooding of local rivers during the Great Flood of 1913 and it this damaged the business sufficiently for it to declare bankruptcy, with the company $624,000 in debt. Initially it was offered for sale for 25 cents on the dollar, but received only one offer, for less than $100,000, prompting its interests, headed by Frank L. Chase, to withdraw the offer. Under an order from a federal judge, $273,000, or 44 percent of the debt, was eventually paid to creditors. In 1914, a new entity, named the New Columbus Buggy Co., was incorporated with $500,000 in capital under a new ownership group, including C. A. Finnegan and E. D. Hoefeller of Buffalo, New York. This entity, controlled by the company's creditors, continued production at the plant. That same year, Firestone died. Both the Firestone Electric and the Columbus-Firestone vehicle lines were produced into 1915, when the company ceased operations, leaving an inventory of 35 new electric cars and 12 automobiles, as well as several used cars.

Following the closure of the Columbus Buggy Co. The Allen Motor Co. of Fostoria, Ohio leased the plant and built automobiles there before closing in 1923. The building itself was home to Janitrol Corp. before being redeveloped as the Buggyworks building in the 1990s.

== Legacy ==
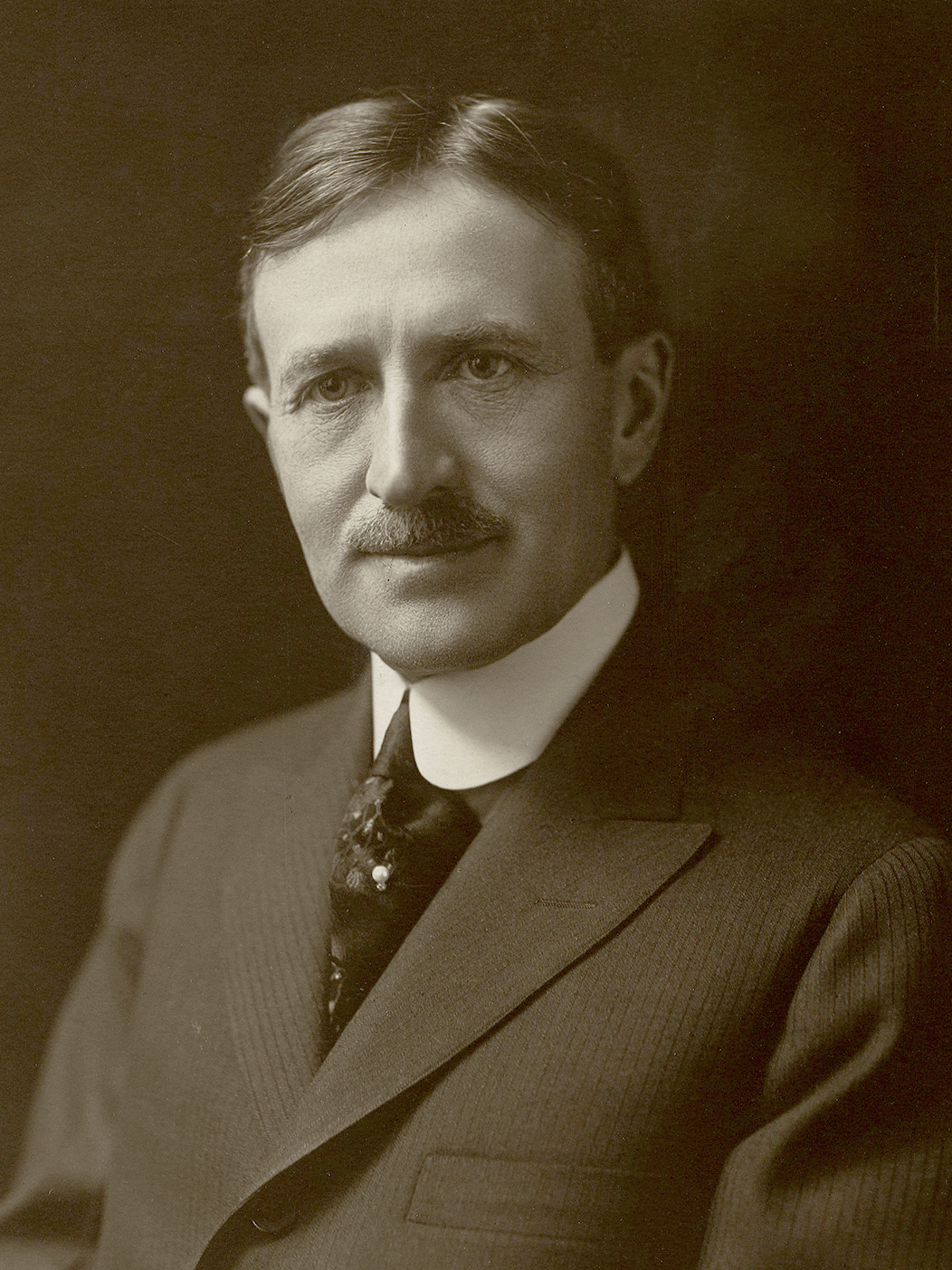
Harvey S. Firestone was a salesman for Columbus Buggy Co. before he launched his own company, Firestone Tire & Rubber Co., in 1900.

The company played a key role in shaping the early history of the automobile. Its manufacturing processes for efficiently producing vehicles were notable and ahead of many companies of its time. The success of the business brought attention to C. D. Firestone, who became a prominent figure in the carriage industry and he became president of the Carriage Builders National Association in 1888. (Note: C. D. Firestone constructed a substantial terra-cotta home at 580 East Broad St. Completed in 1886, the mansion was sold to the Columbus Mutual Life Insurance Co. which used it as a headquarters until the building was demolished in 1962. The site subsequently was home to an auto shop.)

Several of the company's employees rose to great prominence in the industry. Clinton Firestone's cousin, Harvey S. Firestone, was a salesmen for the company. During his time as a salesman, and racing buggies through the streets of Detroit, Michigan, Clinton Firestone met Henry Ford, who helped him obtain tires for custom-built racing carriages. Firestone, seeing the advantage of the buggies' thick rubber tires, left the company and in 1900 founded the Firestone Tire and Rubber Company in Akron to produce rubber tires for carriages and buggies. By 1904, it was the largest tire manufacturer in the world.

Eddie Rickenbacker joined the company at the age of 17, and he quickly became an engineer and troubleshooter, dispatched to help owners when they had problems with their vehicles, and his service increased the reputation of the business among its owners. It was during this assignment that Rickenbacker, while serving as a test driver for the vehicles, developed an affinity for driving fast cars.

Some of the original sales catalog promotional material of the company are still preserved in the Henry Ford Museum.

=== Buggyworks complex ===
The company's original buildings north of downtown Columbus were redeveloped as part of a larger revival of the industrial area north of Columbus — by then termed the Arena District — following the construction of Nationwide Arena. Nationwide Realty Investors, a development affiliate of Nationwide Insurance, acquired two of the production facilities at 390 and 400 W. Nationwide Blvd., termed the "Buggyworks", and redeveloped them into 145,000 square feet of office space. The development project cost $10.5 million. The office buildings attracted a number of tenants, the first being Cameron Mitchell Restaurants. Another portion of the complex at 440 W. Nationwide Blvd., was redeveloped into loft condominiums.

== See also ==
- Clinton DeWeese Firestone mansion
