= Oscar G. Peters =

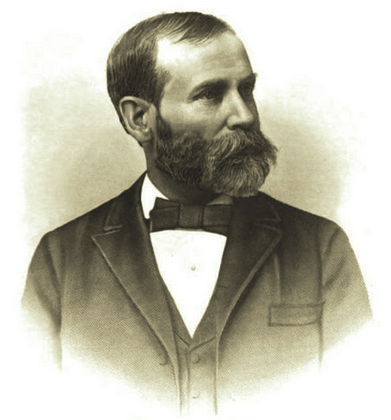
Oscar G. Peters

signature

Oscar Glaze Peters (April 6, 1842 – November 9, 1894) was a 19th-century American businessman. He was at the head of the Peters' Dash & Columbus Buggy Company, where his ability as a businessman and expert accountant proved invaluable in helping to build up the largest manufacturing plant for light vehicles in the world.

== Early life and education ==
Oscar Glaze Peters was born in Chillicothe, Ohio, April 6, 1842. His parents were George and Sarah (Merion) Peters. He was three years old when he came to Columbus, Ohio. The father engaged in the tanning business in the early years of his residence in Columbus but later devoted his time and attention to the manufacture of trunks.

In 1856, he was probably the first newsboy in Columbus, as be sold on the street daily and weekly papers and monthly magazines.

Peters pursued his public school education until he became a high school student. He took a course in the Commercial College, and improved rapidly in double entry bookkeeping, graduating in six months.

== Career ==
He afterward clerked in the store of Robinson & Company for a time and was then employed for three months by the government in guarding bridges, during the civil war. His next appointment made him first clerk in the commissary department of the government in West Virginia under his uncle, Captain Nathaniel Merion, and later he was appointed chief clerk in the same department under Colonel Murphy. For a time, he was stationed at Covington, Kentucky, and later, for eleven months, at Cleveland, Ohio, after which he was sent to Fort Leavenworth, Kansas.

On leaving Fort Leavenworth, Peters returned to Columbus and as a bookkeeper, entered the employ of Kelton & Bancroft, with whom he remained for about two years. He afterward engaged in the grocery business on his own account, admitting his youngest brother, Charles, to a partnership. They conducted their store at Gay and High streets for two years and were afterward at Spring and High streets for eight years. On the expiration of that period they sold out, believing they could do better in other business lines.

Peters reorganized the Iron Buggy Company, changing the name to the Columbus Buggy Company, in which he invested a capital of US$100,000. He erected a factory, stores and branch offices and instituted what soon became one of the leading manufacturing enterprises of the city. He was the financial manager for many years, also looked after its books and was largely instrumental in building up an extensive business which became profitable.

== Personal life ==
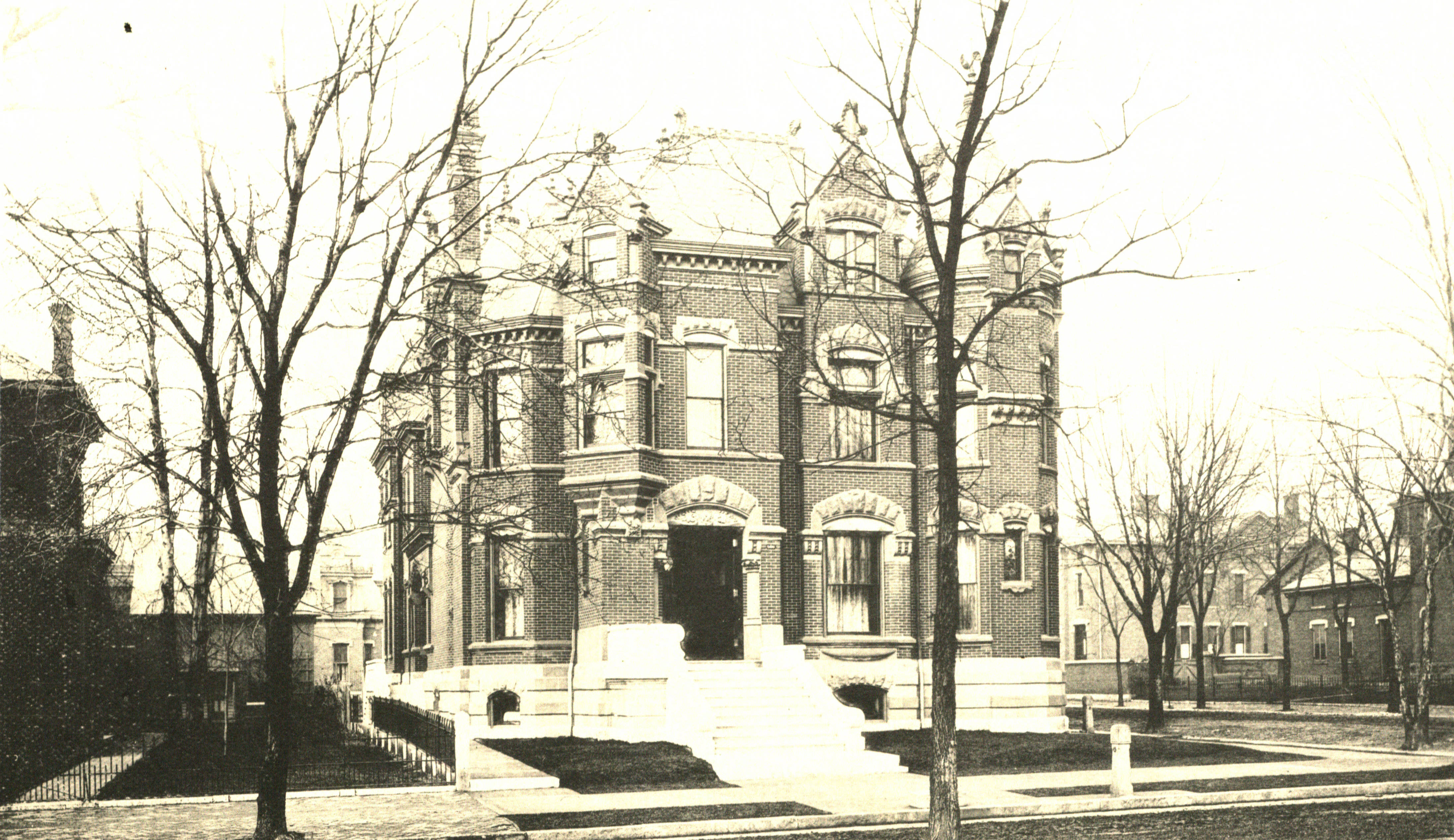
House in Columbus

On May 21, 1863, at Columbus, he married Alice E. Heckler, who was born in Dayton, Ohio, and then came to Columbus as a teenager. The couple had two children: Sarah Alice (1868-1869) and Earl Clifford (b. 1870).

At the age of 15, he became a member of the old Town Street Methodist Episcopal Church and later united with the Wesley Chapel Methodist Episcopal church.

He belonged to the Independent Order of Odd Fellows. In politics, he was a member of the Republican Party.

In 1891, he had an attack of the grip which left him in feeble physical condition. Under the immense strain of carrying a large business through the panic of 1893, he suffered a nervous breakdown, subject to depression with suicidal tendencies. For some time, he was under treatment at Hawkes Hospital (now, Mount Carmel West), and was finally sent to Jackson Sanatorium in the hope that being away from business concerns and complete rest would result in his ultimate recovery. He committed suicide at Dansville, Livingston County, New York, November 9, 1894.
