= Arena District =

- Neighborhood of Columbus
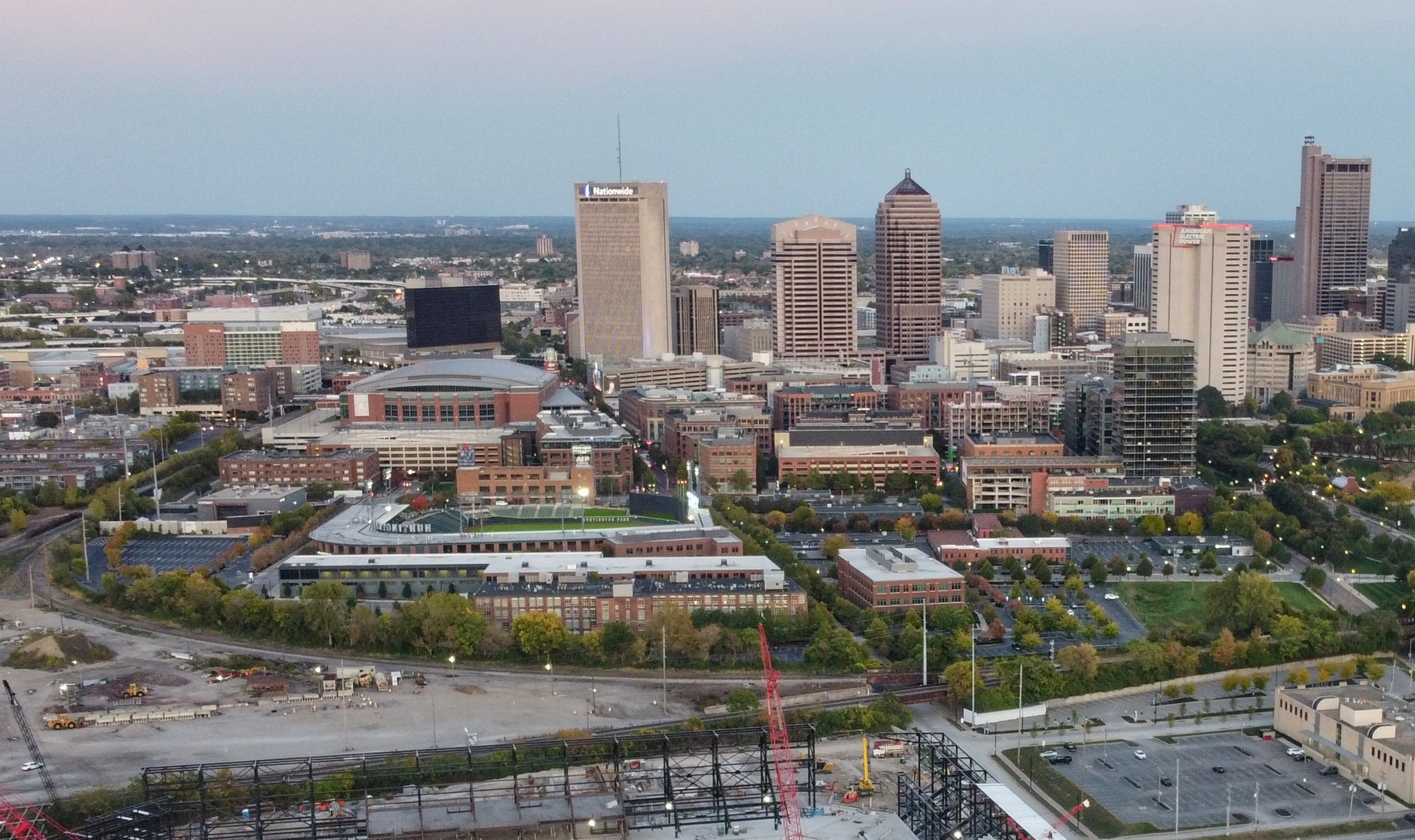
- The Arena District (foreground) by downtown
- Interactive map of Arena District
- Coordinates: 39°58′09″N 83°00′22″W
- Country: United States
- State: Ohio
- County: Franklin
- City: Columbus
- ZIP Code: 43215
- Area code: 614
- Website: www.arenadistrict.com

The Arena District is a mixed-use planned development and neighborhood in Columbus, Ohio. The site was developed through a partnership between Nationwide Realty Investors, Ltd. (a subsidiary of Nationwide), the City of Columbus and private investors. Interpretation of the boundaries of the district are evolving as the neighboring blocks around the original 75-acre (300,000 m^{2}) site have seen additional commercial and residential development. The Arena District is named for Nationwide Arena.

== History ==
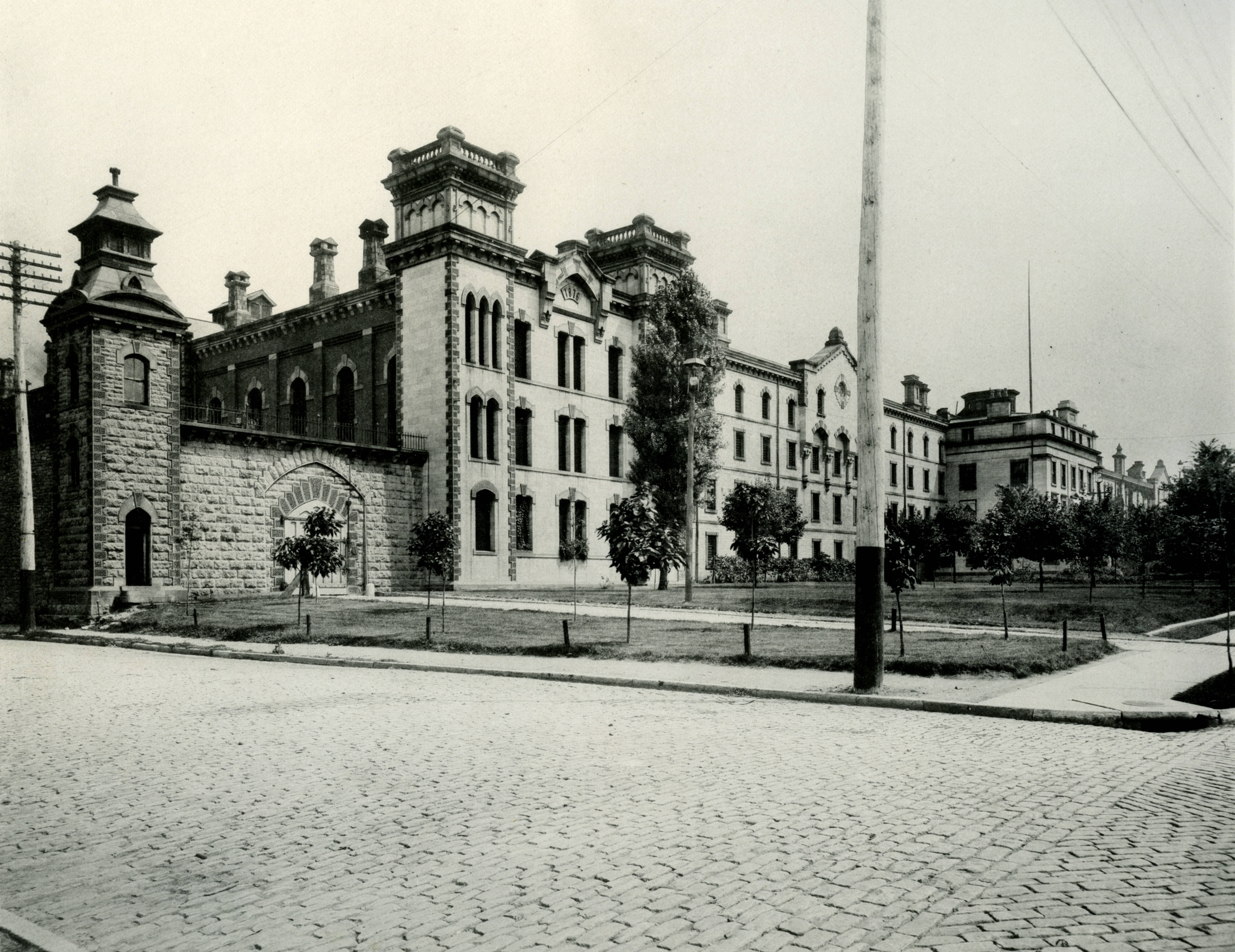
The Ohio Penitentiary

A Mingo settlement is known to have occupied part of the land along the Scioto River in the 1790s. With the rapid expansion of Columbus, the land subsequently became an industrial corridor. In the 1870s the northern land was mostly small houses and fields. Columbus Buggy Company built its first production sites in the area and continued to expand them until the company moved its production to Dublin Road in 1906. By the 1910s it was a light manufacturing hub home to Pabst Brewing Co., Ohio Casket Co., Stuart Lamneck Co. and the Columbus Auto Brass Co. In the 1930 it had been reduced to vacant houses and several businesses and by 1950 the industry there had mostly dried up.

Three successive railroad hubs, named Union Station, existed on the site, with the first being built in 1850 at High Street and Nationwide Blvd. A second station replaced it in 1868, and a third was built to the west along East Goodale Street. (Note: One remaining arch from this station stands in what is now McPherson Park.)

The Ohio Penitentiary opened on the site in 1834 and served as a large scale prison facility until 1984. The prison grew dramatically in size to house 5,235 prisoners in 1955. But it is also the site of a 1930 fire that killed 322 inmates, one of the worst fires in American prison history. The prison was vacant until it was demolished in 1998. (Note: An Ohio Historical Society Marker for Confederate General John Hunt Morgan, who escaped from the prison, is located at the north end of McFerson Commons Park, which is one of several sites created from the former Ohio Penitentiary grounds.)

=== Arena construction ===
Around the mid-1990s the area was almost entirely abandoned and redevelopment opportunities were envisioned by the City of Columbus. Following the closure of the Ohio Penitentiary the land was owned by the City of Columbus and it courted various firms and investors for redevelopment plans. At the time of the project in 1996 then City Councilman Michael B. Coleman, who was later the mayor of Columbus, said that the Ohio Penitentiary site is the “most important and potentially most valuable single site in downtown Columbus.” After proposals were reviewed, the City Council approved the redevelopment proposal from Nationwide Realty Investors (NRI) and sold the company the 23-acres of land for $11.7 million. NRI purchased an additional four acres from American Electric Power Company (AEP) for $11 million.

The Ohio Department of Development provided a $750,000 grant to help with cleanup on the land.

NRI worked further with The Columbus Dispatch Printing Company, private investors, and the city of Columbus to fund work in the district. NRI funded $450 million of the project, the Dispatch provided an additional $10 million, and other private investors provided $40 million more for the construction of buildings in the Arena District. Additional financing to construct infrastructure was provided by the city of Columbus; these included a tax increment financing (TIF) district in downtown Columbus, and two tax incentive packages: one for downtown office development and another 10 year tax holiday for newly constructed residential properties.

=== Subsequent development ===
In 2009, there had been a proposal to construct the Hollywood Casino Columbus in the Arena District on the site of a former tool factory next to Huntington Park, estimated to cost $250 million including 5,000 slot machines and table games, but was met with opposition from landlords in the Arena District. The casino was eventually built in the city's western neighborhoods. In 2021, ScottsMiracle-Gro Field (formerly Lower.com Field, a soccer-specific stadium that is the home of the Columbus Crew, was built on the site and will be the anchor of the Astor Park neighborhood, which is currently under construction.

By the end of 2013 construction began on the last phase of the Arena District, with an expected completion date of Summer 2014. The last major phase of construction includes the new headquarters for Columbus-based Columbia Gas of Ohio and completed second phase of the residential Flats on Vine.

== Geography ==
The 75-acre (300,000 m^{2}) Arena District site is bounded by Vine Street to the north, Spring Street to the south, N. High Street to the east and Neil Avenue to the west. The commonly accepted borders of the Arena District are considerably larger, as evidenced by both the Arena District website and locals when referring to it. The expanded boundaries include Huntington Park, the Lifestyles Community Pavilion and Buggyworks to the west, and Nationwide's corporate headquarters to the east.

Arena District is directly south of the North Market and Park Street Districts, north of Downtown and west of the Greater Columbus Convention Center. Generally, when walking west of High Street the land falls away towards the Olentangy River, and the grade is significant, especially alongside Nationwide Arena.

The neighborhood has several public spaces that are used for major events throughout the year such as McFerson Commons Park (commonly referred to as Arch Park), Battelle Plaza and Nationwide Arena Plaza. These events include: The Arnold Sports Festival, Jazz & Rib Fest, Columbus Blue Jackets hockey games and concerts. There is also a pedestrian walkway and footbridge that extends from Battelle Plaza at the east side of Nationwide Arena to Vine Street where there are numerous bars and restaurants, and access to parking garages.

== Economy ==
The neighborhood has numerous restaurants, bars, and shops. The businesses largely depend on high-traffic periods during conventions at the nearby Greater Columbus Convention Center and sporting events at Nationwide Arena and Huntington Park. During the COVID-19 pandemic in 2020, the neighborhood businesses suffered from little revenue, as the event centers had canceled all events.

== Structures and landmarks ==
There are several notable structures and landmarks in the Arena District:

=== Nationwide Arena ===
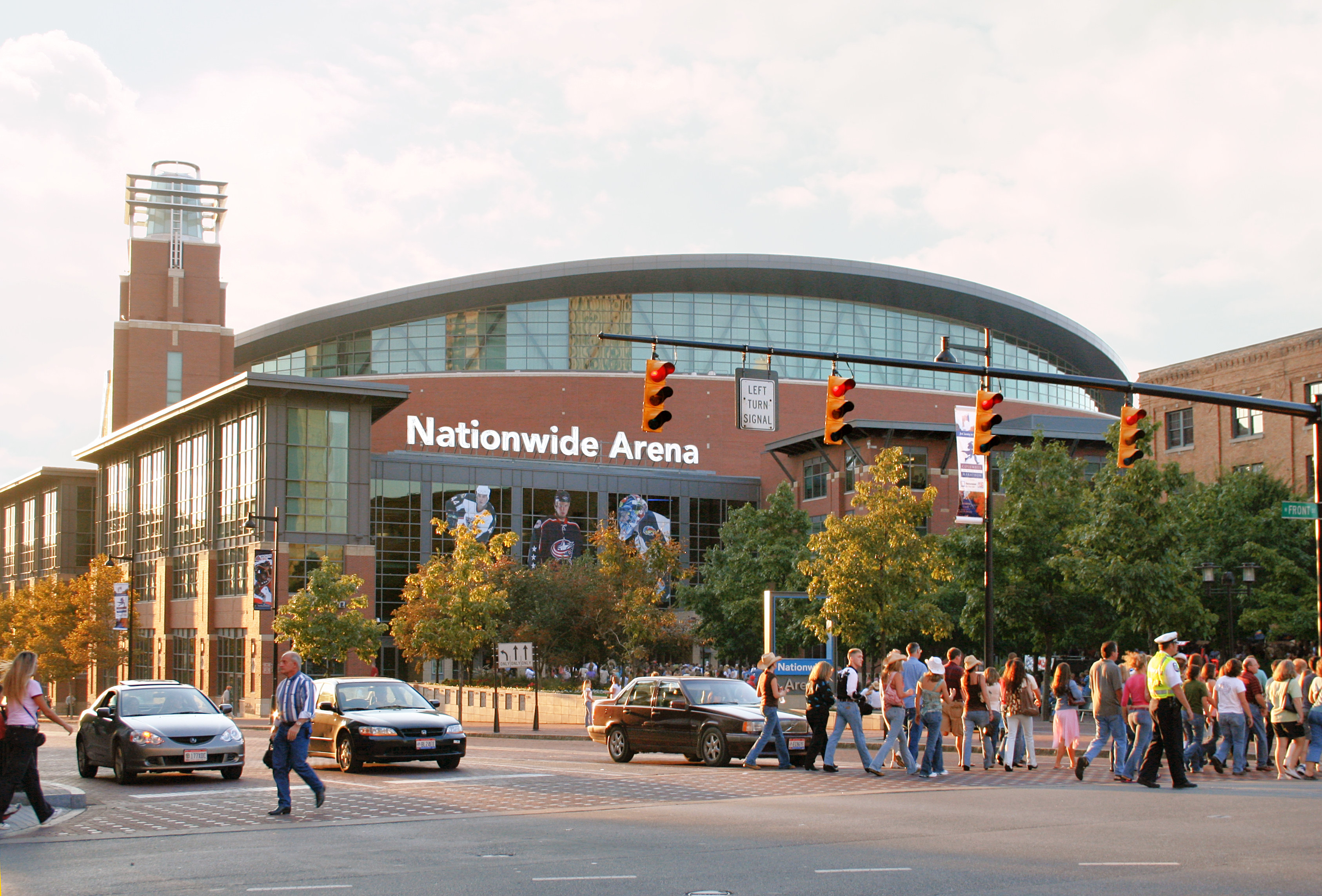
Nationwide Arena

The namesake of Arena District, Nationwide Arena was completed in 2000 and is the home of the Columbus Blue Jackets NHL hockey team, who is also the primary tenant. Nationwide Arena has a seating capacity of 18,500 for hockey, 19,500 for basketball and 20,000 for concerts. It has also hosted NCAA Men's and Women's Basketball National Championship Regional games, NCAA Men's Ice Hockey games, Ohio State University Fall Semester Convocation, performance events and concerts ranging from Taylor Swift to Disney on Ice.

=== KEMBA Live!, The Basement and A&R Music Bar ===
KEMBA Live!, formerly known as Express Live!, Lifestyle Communities Pavilion and PromoWest Pavilion, is a concert venue in Columbus, Ohio. During the spring-summer-autumn seasons, they host outdoor concerts on a regular basis, and have indoor concerts year-round. The venue seats 2,200 (indoors) and 4,500 in its Backyard Amphitheater (outdoors). Smaller acts perform in The Basement, a venue that is attached to the facility, or in the A&R Music Bar next door.

=== Huntington Park ===
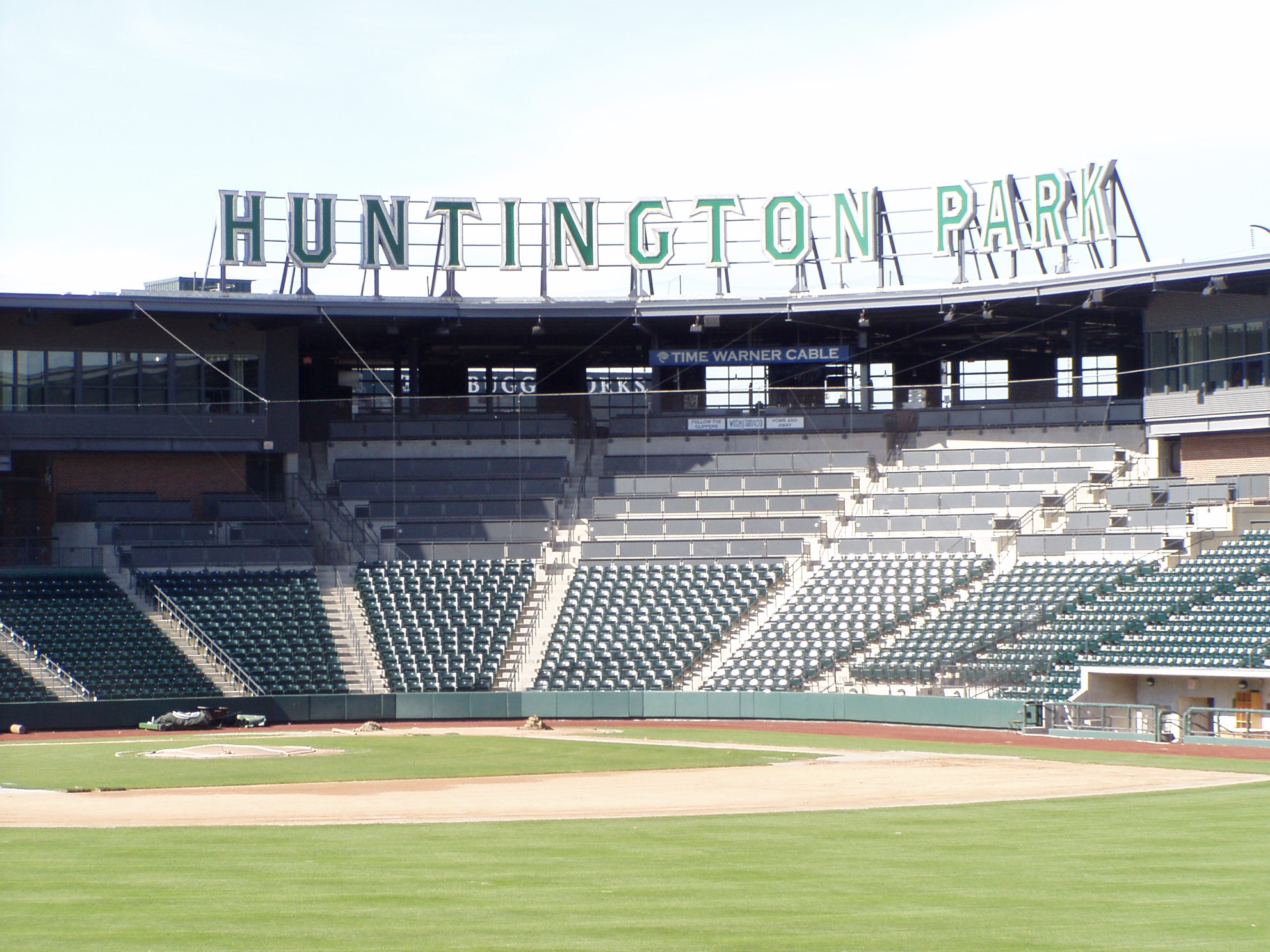
Huntington Park

Huntington Park was completed in 2009 and is the home of the Columbus Clippers baseball team. The Clippers have been the AAA affiliate of the Cleveland Indians/Guardians since 2009 and play in the International League. The stadium has also hosted the Big 10 Men's College Baseball tournament in 2009, 2010, 2011 and 2012. It cost $70 million to build. It is not a part of the original Arena District site, but has since been incorporated into the neighborhood. The stadium has a capacity of 10,100 fans and set a stadium record for attendance on July 26, 2010 with an attendance of 12,517 fans for a game between the Clippers and Pawtucket Red Sox.

=== ScottsMiracle-Gro Field ===
ScottsMiracle-Gro Field began construction in 2019 and opened two years later on July 3, 2021 at a cost of $314 million.

=== McFerson Commons ===
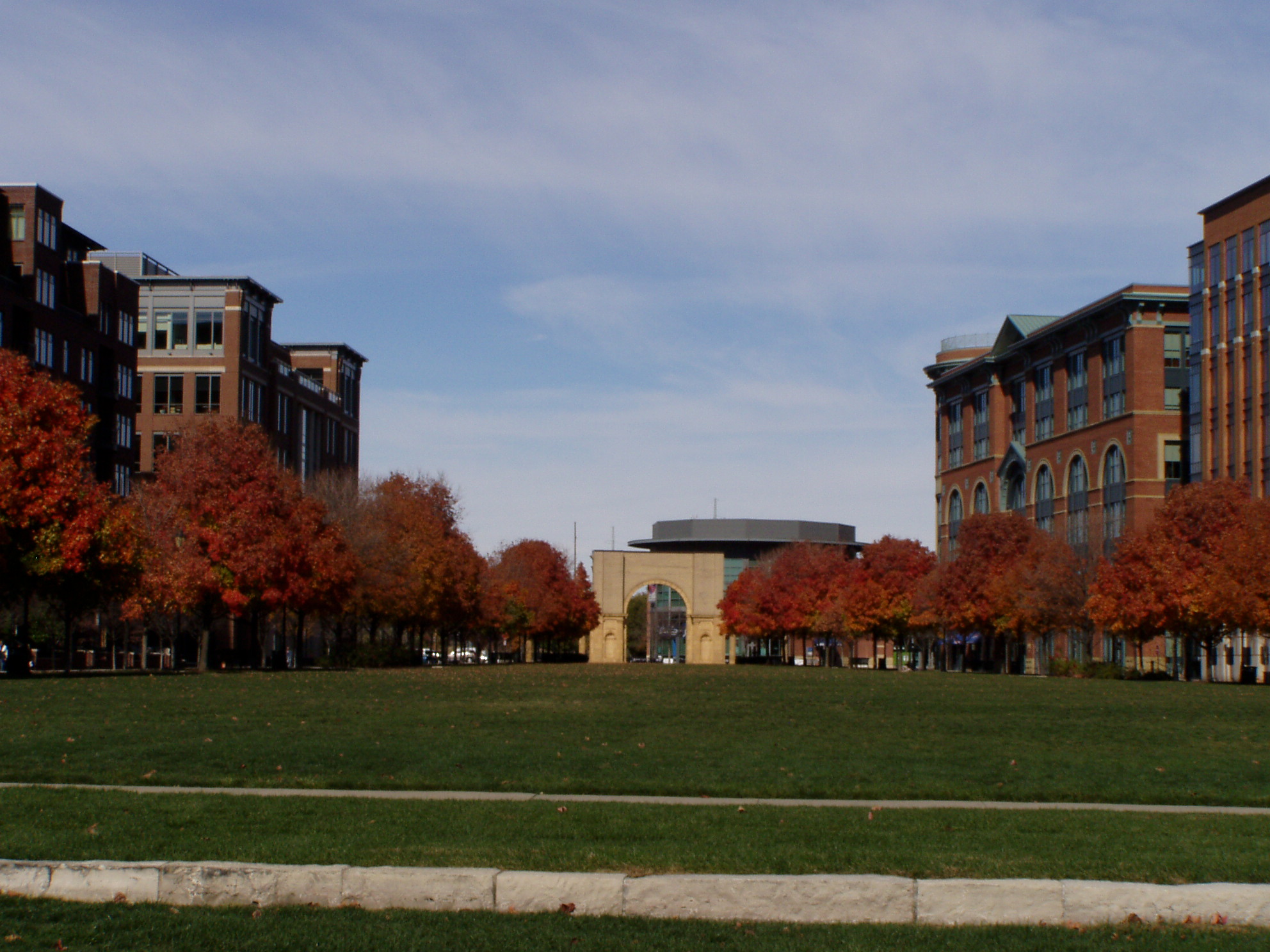
McFerson Commons

McFerson Commons, also known as Arch Park, is a 2.21 acres (0.89 ha) park that was developed by Nationwide Insurance after the demolition of the Ohio Penitentiary. It is part of the Scioto Mile Parks System, a sub-system of the Columbus Recreation and Parks Department. The park is dedicated to honor Dimon R. McFerson who was the Chairman and CEO of Nationwide Insurance from 1992 to 2000. The Beaux-Arts arch is the focal point of the park and is located opposite Nationwide Arena Plaza. The arch was recovered from Columbus's Union Station during its 1979 demolition to make way for the Greater Columbus Convention Center, which serves as the Arena District's eastern boundary. Locals often incorrectly believe the Arch came from the Ohio Penitentiary. The park hosts numerous events throughout the year, such as marathons, triathlons, concerts and auxiliary events for Columbus Blue Jackets games and other events at Nationwide Arena.

=== Battelle Plaza ===
Battelle Plaza is an open-air Plaza located on the east side of Nationwide Arena. It is named for Battelle Memorial Institute, a non-profit research and development company. It is the hub of many events, but most notably Columbus Blue Jackets pre-game festivities. It provides access to Nationwide Arena and a pedestrian walkway that runs through the center of the Arena District. This walkway provides further access to restaurants and bars. The pedestrian bridge often serves as a meeting point for those attending events at Nationwide Arena.

=== Nationwide Arena Plaza ===
Nationwide Arena Plaza is an open-air plaza located on the west side of Nationwide Arena and sits across Nationwide Boulevard from McFerson Commons. It provides access to the Ohio Health Ice Haus, the practice facility of the Columbus Blue Jackets and several local high school teams, and the Big Lots! Box Office. It hosts numerous events in the Arena District, but serves as a primary entrance for Columbus Blue Jackets games and other arena events. It hosts lines prior to Blue Jackets games for the Student Ticket Rush and the Huntington Green Seats promotions.

== Residential ==
The Arena District has five new-construction residential buildings with a total of 770 units ranging from studio-style apartments to four-bedroom units.

One of these residential buildings, Buggyworks, was the manufacturing facility of the Columbus Buggy Co. The Columbus Buggy Co. is notable for its likely influence on Henry Ford, and production methods for buggys/automobiles, as well as ties to Clinton Firestone (President of Columbus Buggy Co.), cousin to American Industrialist Harvey Samuel Firestone. Harvey Firestone sold Columbus Buggys in Detroit, Michigan prior to the founding of Firestone Tires. Production at the Columbus Buggy Co. peaked in the 1890s, but faltered due to the invention and adoption of the automobile, as well as substantial damage from the Great Flood of 1913.

== Sports ==
=== Columbus Blue Jackets ===
The Columbus Blue Jackets are a National Hockey League hockey team in the Metropolitan Division of the Eastern Conference. Founded in 2000 as an expansion team of the NHL, the Columbus Blue Jackets play their home games and are the primary tenant of Nationwide Arena in the Arena District neighborhood. Their name comes from the Union Army of the American Civil War who wore blue jackets. One of the more notable traditions of the Columbus Blue Jackets is the Cannon used during the hockey games. The cannon is fired when the Blue Jackets enter the arena, score a goal and win a game, followed by the chorus of “The Whip” by band Locksley. The cannon is a replica of a 12 lbs. 1857 Napoleon Cannon that was commonly used during the American Civil War. Two similar Napoleon cannons are a short walk away at the Ohio Statehouse where they can be found “…standing in silent guard,” of the Capitol.

=== Columbus Clippers ===
The Columbus Clippers are the minor league Triple-A affiliate of the MLB Cleveland Indians. The Clippers play in the International League and play their home games at Huntington Park. Columbus was awarded the Clippers franchise in 1977. From 1977 to 2008 the Clippers played their home games at Cooper Stadium, previously known as Franklin County Stadium and referred to by fans as “The Coop.” In 2009 the Clippers moved into Huntington Park. The Clippers have been the minor league team for the Pittsburgh Pirates, New York Yankees, Washington Nationals and Cleveland Indians.

=== Columbus Crew ===
Only July 3, 2021, the Crew moved from their longtime home of Mapfre Stadium to Lower.com Field.

== Entertainment ==
The neighborhood has several public spaces that are used of for major events throughout the year. These events include the Arnold Sports Festival, Jazz & Rib Fest, Columbus Blue Jackets hockey games, marathons and triathlons. Additionally, there are restaurants and bars that populate arena district. Other nearby entertainment is available in the Park Street District, directly north of the Arena District.
