= Ohio Penitentiary =

Ohio prison operating from 1834 to 1984

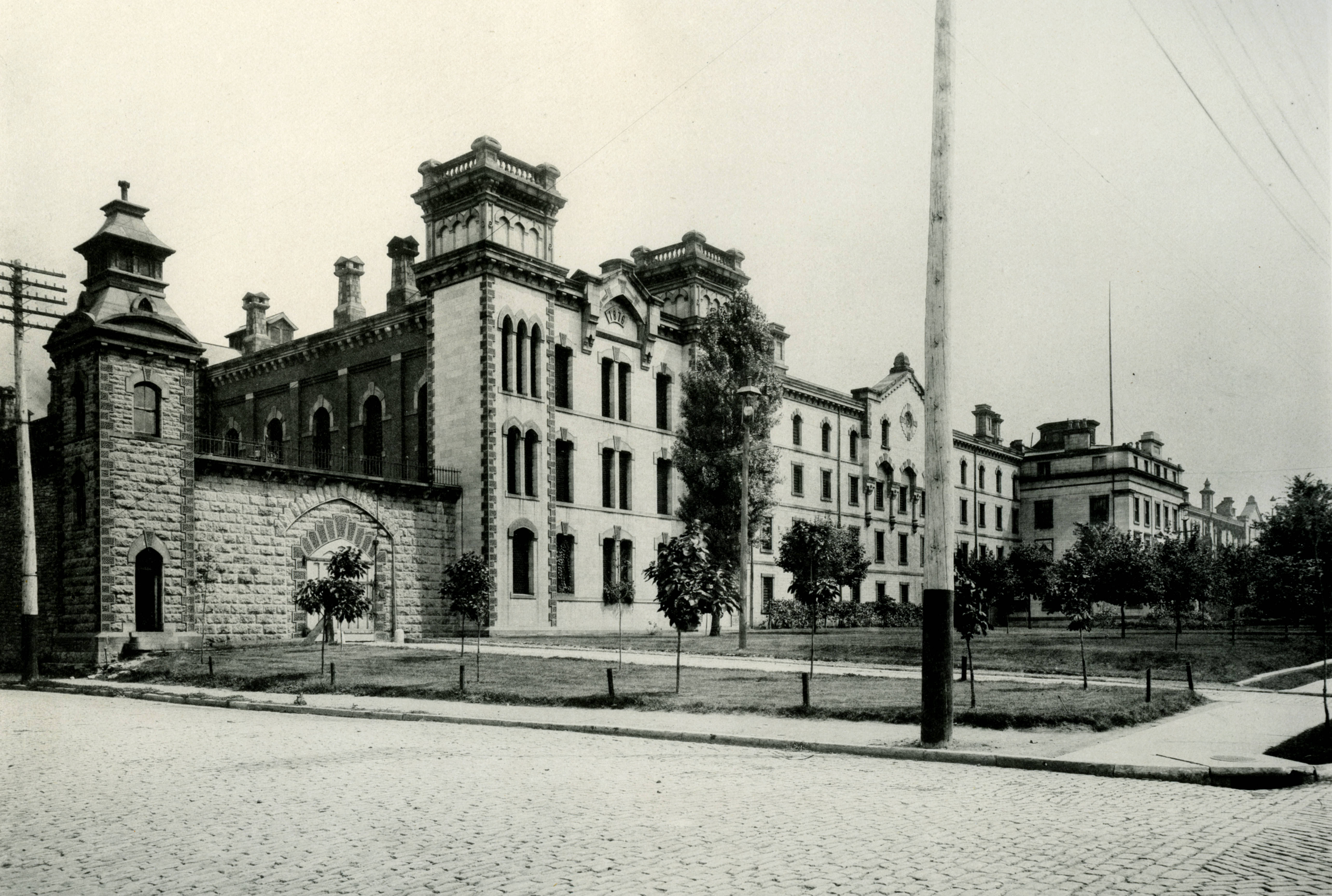
- The prison c. 1897
- Present-day site of the prison
- Location: Bounded by W Spring St. (to the south), Neil Ave. (west), West St. (east), W Nationwide Blvd. (north); 39°58′3.25″N 83°0′29.92″W
- Status: Demolished
- Population: 5,235 (1955)
- Opened: 1834
- Closed: 1984

Notable prisoners
- John Hunt Morgan, Bugs Moran, O. Henry, Chester Himes, Sam Sheppard

The Ohio Penitentiary, also known as the Ohio State Penitentiary, was a prison operated from 1834 to 1984 in downtown Columbus, Ohio, in what is now known as the Arena District. The state had built a small prison in Columbus in 1813, but as the state's population grew the earlier facility was not able to handle the number of prisoners sent to it by the courts. When the penitentiary first opened in 1834, not all of the buildings were completed. The prison housed 5,235 prisoners at its peak in 1955. Prison conditions were described as "primitive" and the facility was eventually replaced by the Southern Ohio Correctional Facility, a maximum security facility in Lucasville. During its operation, it housed several well-known inmates, including General John H. Morgan, George "Bugs" Moran, O. Henry, Chester Himes, and Sam Sheppard. A separate women's prison was built within its walls in 1837. The buildings were demolished in 1997.

== History ==
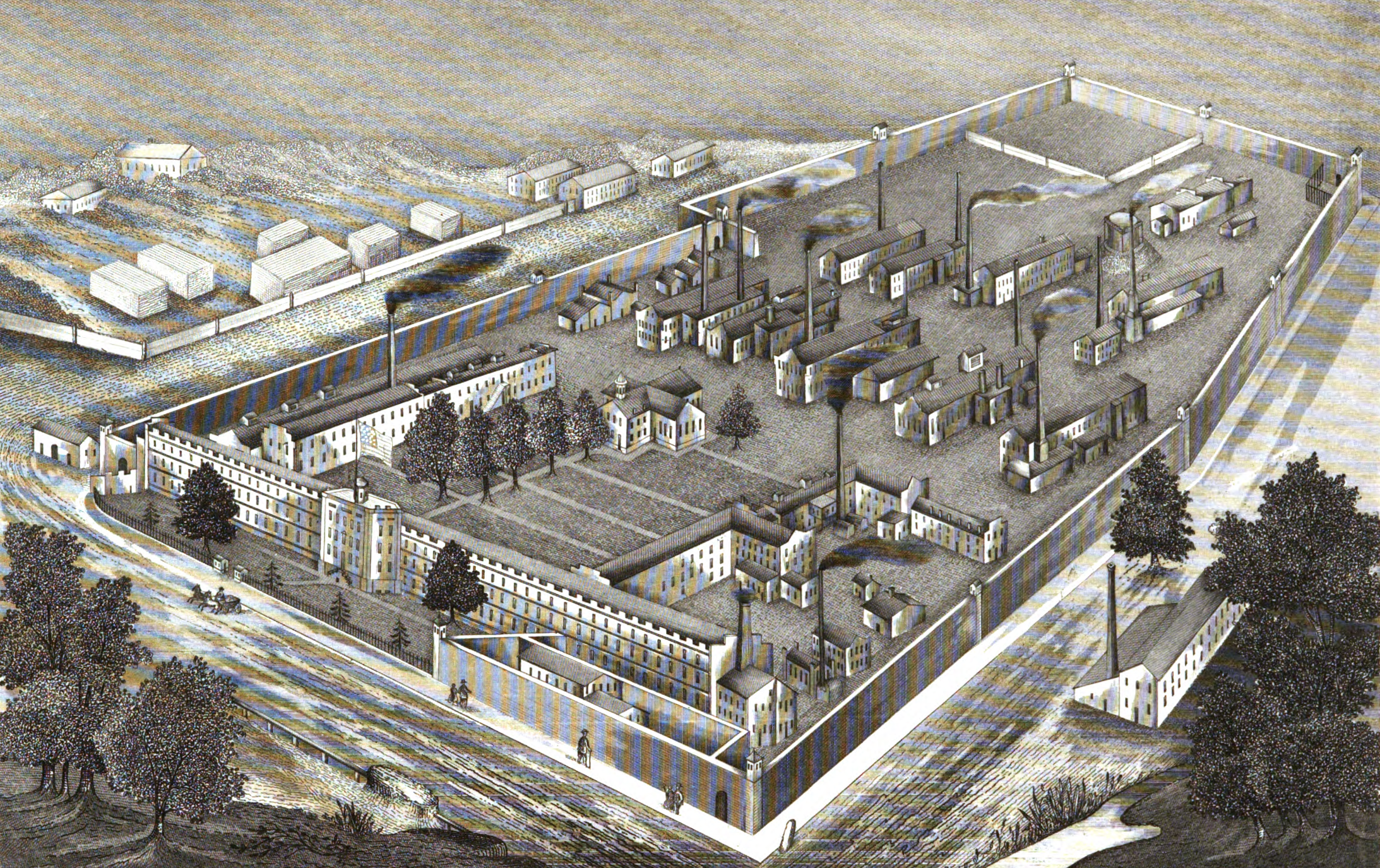
1874 illustration of the prison

The prison was completed in 1815, replacing a more primitive one constructed by the Franklin County Court of Common Pleas a mile south in Franklinton. It initially consisted of 13 cells. Its first inmates were two brothers, John and David Evans, who arrived August 15, 1815. (Note: The Franklin County Court of Common Pleas ordered the construction of the first jail in Columbus, which was built in the Franklinton neighborhood to the south, though this space consisted of log buildings and whipping posts surrounded by a stockade fence.)

Among the wardens of the penitentiary was Charles C. Walcutt, a former general in the Union Army during the Civil War. The prison's final warden was Terry Taylor.

=== Capital punishment ===
In 1885, Ohio legislators passed a law requiring executions to take place at the Ohio Penitentiary; prior, local law enforcement were responsible for carrying out executions in the counties where inmates were convicted. The penitentiary first accommodated executions by hanging, starting with the hanging of convicted murderer Valentine Wagner on July 31, 1885. On July 1, 1896, Ohio's state legislature voted to replace the prison's gallows with the electric chair, thus making Ohio the second state in the United States to adopt and use that method of execution. Ohio's first executions by electrocution took place on April 21, 1897, when teenager William Haas and 38-year-old William Wiley, both convicted of murder, were executed shortly after midnight; Haas died first at 12:27 am, and Wiley followed minutes later. The last death sentence carried out at the prison, and Ohio's final electrocution, was that of Donald Reinbolt on March 15, 1963.

A total of 343 inmates were executed at the penitentiary; 28 men were hanged between 1885 and 1896, and 312 men and three women were electrocuted between 1897 and 1963, as Ohio subsequently experienced a hiatus in executions. In 1972, the prison's electric chair and the state's death row were relocated to the Southern Ohio Correctional Facility in Lucasville, Ohio, although the chair was never used at that location before it was permanently retired in 2001 and donated to the Ohio Historical Society in 2002.

=== 1930 fire ===
On April 21, 1930, a major fire killed 322 inmates and hospitalized another 230 in what was one of the deadliest fires in North American prison history. The fire started when a candle ignited oily rags on a roof in the prison's six-story West Block, east of Neil Avenue on the western edge of the prison. It was first noticed after prisoners had been locked in their cells for the evening. Reports say that many guards refused to unlock cells when smoke entered the cell block and left the prisoners in their cells, although some did provide help. Some inmates overpowered a guard and took his keys, which they used to rescue other prisoners. A prison riot developed and firefighters arriving to fight the blaze were attacked with rocks.

A cordon of penitentiary guards was deployed about the towering prison walls. Other squads took up vantage points in guard towers and by this time 500 soldiers from Fort Hayes, a local military post, were on the scene. Machine guns were placed at the gates and on the walls. Bayonets were fixed and the troopers were ordered to shoot to kill. A troop of National Guardsmen soon augmented the regulars, and 30 minutes after the fire started the prison was completely surrounded.

Prison officials later alleged that James Raymond, 30, who was imprisoned for burglary, intentionally started the fire, along with fellow prisoners Hugh Gibbons, 29, and Clinton Grate, 34, as part of an escape attempt. Raymond and Grate were said to have died by suicide in the months after the event. Historians have disputed the veracity of this allegation, suggesting it was a means to divert attention from poor management of the fire.

=== Riots ===
The prison was the site of the "Halloween Riot", on October 31, 1952, which left one inmate dead and four injured, as well as the riot of August 1968, which ended with five dead inmates, five injured inmates and seven injured officers.

=== Human experimentation ===
In the 1950s, a prominent virologist named Chester M. Southam injected inmates from the Ohio State Penitentiary with HeLa cells in order to observe if people could be made immune to cancer by developing an acquired immune response. He compared the results of this experiment to an experiment in which he injected cancer cells into cancer patients, and observed that the prison subjects fought off the cancer faster than the subjects who had cancer.

== Closure ==
In 1978, Ohio's branch of the American Civil Liberties Union filed a lawsuit on behalf of inmates, who argued in their lawsuit that conditions at the prison were in violation of the Eighth Amendment to the United States Constitution prohibiting cruel and unusual punishment. By 1979, the penitentiary had been renamed to the Columbus Correctional Facility, and was operating under a federal consent decree that mandated that it be closed by December 1983. Prior to its closure, the penitentiary experienced overcrowding, as it was rated to hold a maximum capacity of 700 prisoners yet held 1,990 prisoners by November 1983. The state gradually phased out the prison, moving inmates to other facilities; the last inmate left the facility in August 1984.

After the closure of the Ohio Penitentiary in 1984, the building stood vacant for more than a decade, though it was used as a training site for a time by the Ohio National Guard, was briefly known as "The Demon Pen" for Halloween festivities, and attracted a number of urban explorers. The building also served as the setting for the 1985 made-for-TV movie Love on the Run, starring Stephanie Zimbalist and Alec Baldwin. The state eventually sold the property and building to the city of Columbus for development purposes in 1995. Demolition of the site was performed by S.G. Loewendick & Sons. Before demolition was approved, the Columbus mayor at the time, Buck Rinehart, personally took a wrecking ball to a portion of the building prematurely, and was ordered to have the damage patched.

The former penitentiary site now sits within the Arena District, with Burnham Square Condominiums, McFerson Commons, and several office buildings and parking garages now standing on the site.

== Notable inmates ==
Inmate name	Details
David Allan Coe	Country music singer.
Lester Eubanks	Wanted fugitive who escaped from the prison on December 7, 1973, on the U.S. Marshals' 15 Most Wanted Fugitives as of 2022.
Anna Marie Hahn	Serial killer; after her conviction in November 1937, she was housed at the Ohio Penitentiary for 371 days until her execution at the prison on December 7, 1938.
O. Henry	Sentenced to three years for embezzlement, and was registered as prisoner no. 30664 on March 25, 1898, and is known to have written at least 14 of his short stories from the James Hospital building on the west edge of the prison. Released on July 24, 1901.
Tacks Latimer	Baseball player convicted of murder in 1925; pardoned in 1930.
Charles Makley and Harry Pierpont	Aides to gangster John Dillinger; Makley was killed during an escape attempt on September 22, 1934, while Pierpont, who survived the escape attempt with severe injuries, was executed at the prison on October 17, 1934.
George "Bugs" Moran	Mobster.
John Hunt Morgan	Confederate Army General who escaped from the prison.
James H. Snook	American Olympic gold medalist found guilty of the 1929 murder of Theora Hix, with whom he was having an extramarital affair. He was held in the Ohio Penitentiary before being executed by means of the electric chair in February 1930.
Sam Sheppard	Convicted of the 1954 murder of his pregnant wife, Marilyn Reese Sheppard, and imprisoned at the Ohio Penitentiary. After the conviction was overturned by the U.S. Supreme Court, he was given a retrial and acquitted in 1966.
John Weber	Declared the oldest prisoner in the United States in 1974. Sentenced to life imprisonment after shooting his 18-month-old daughter to death. Served over 48 years in prison; began his sentence in 1926 and celebrated his 99th birthday in 1974.

== Gallery ==
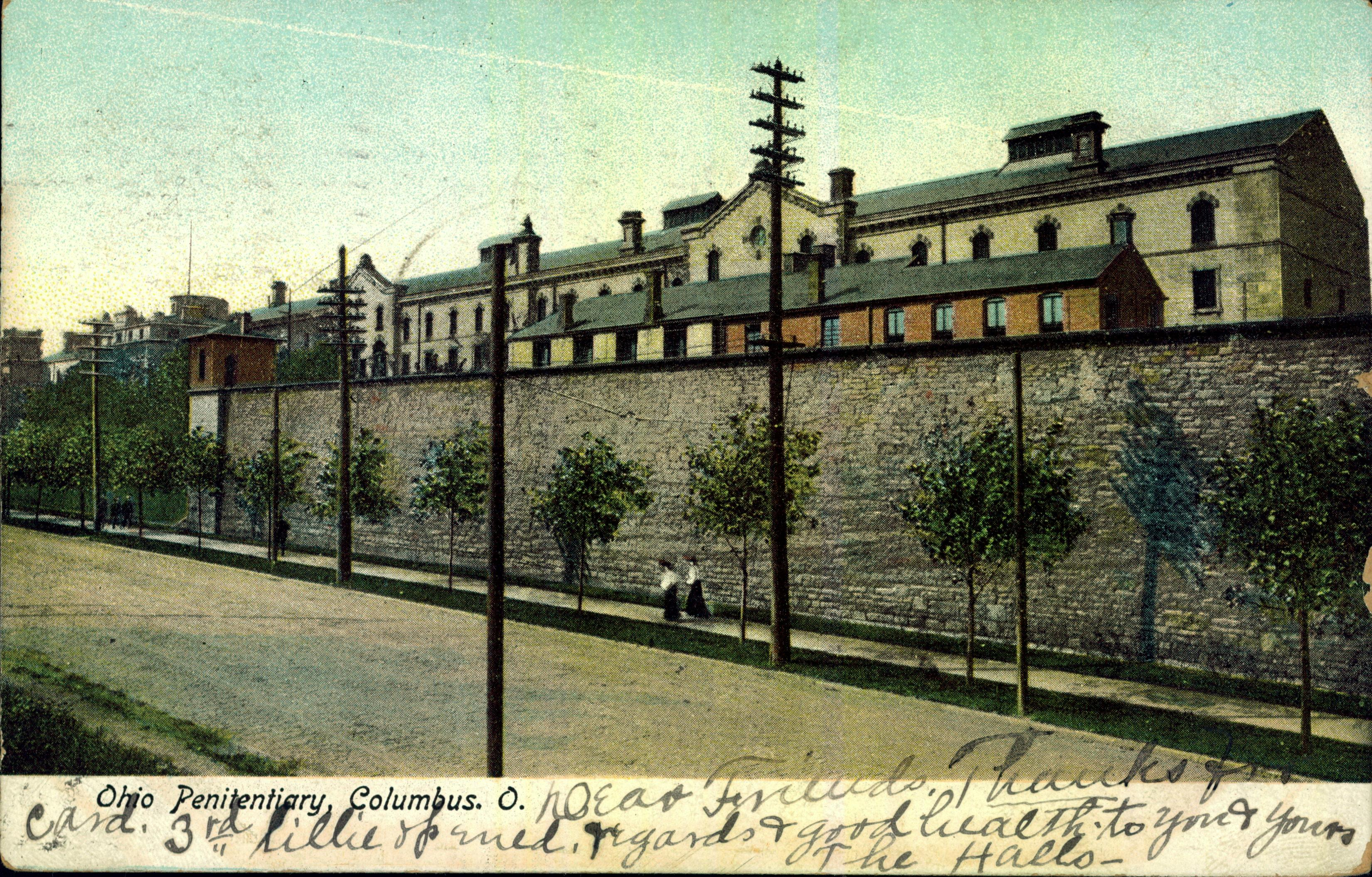
A postcard depicting the Ohio Penitentiary

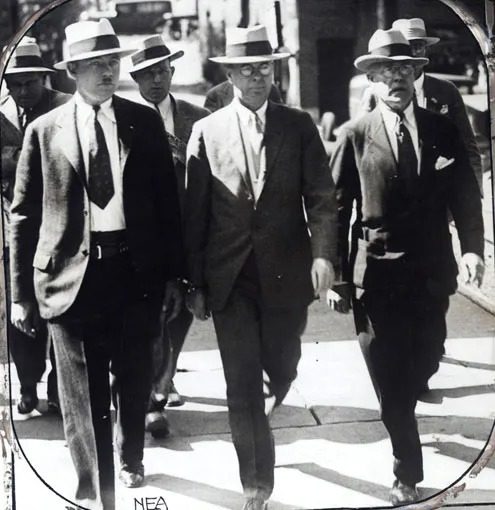
James H. Snook (center) arriving at the Ohio Penitentiary in 1929 to be held prior to his execution

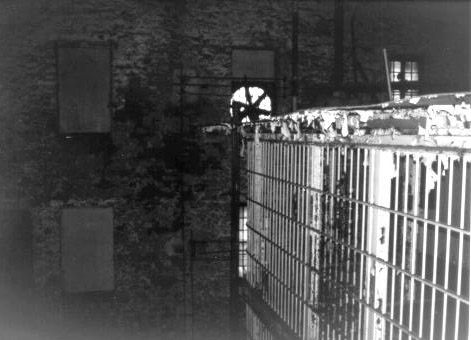
A cell block in the abandoned prison, shortly before demolition

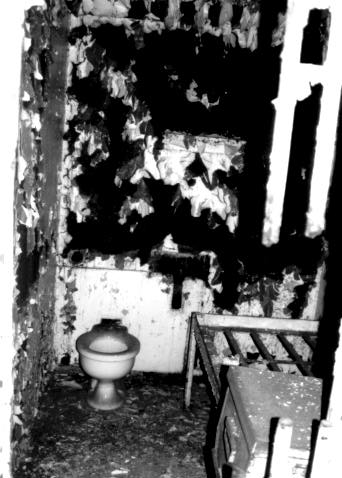
A cell in the abandoned prison, shortly before demolition

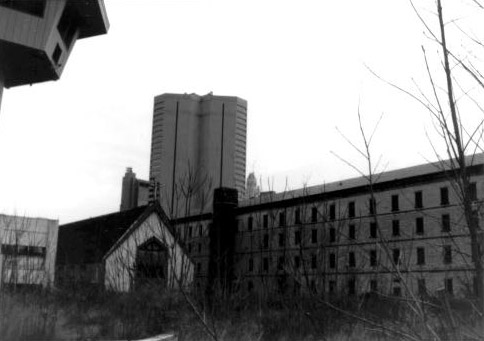
The courtyard of the abandoned prison

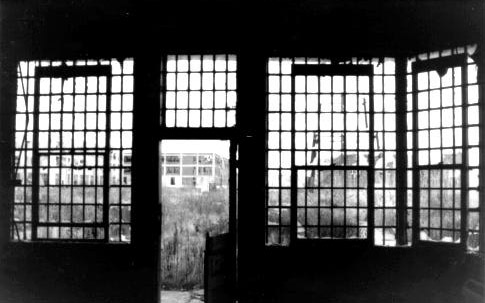
Gate to the prison's courtyard

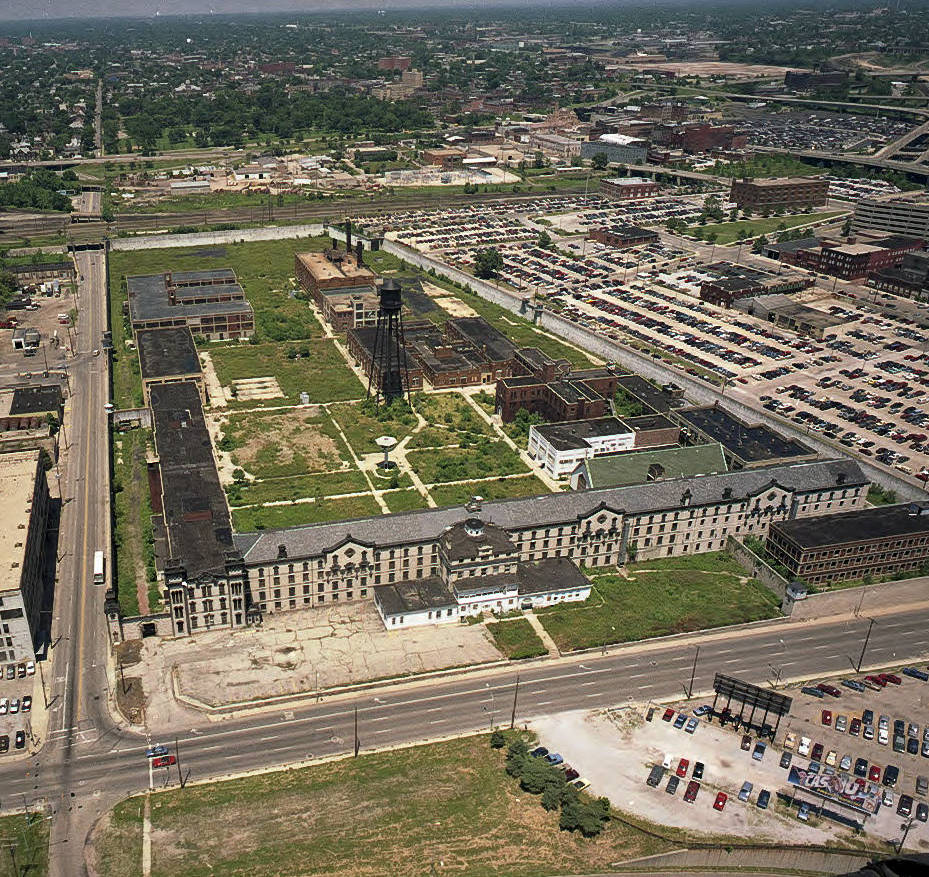
Aerial view in 1990

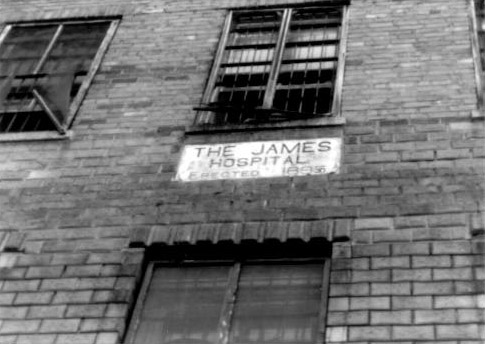
The James Hospital on the site of the former penitentiary in 1995

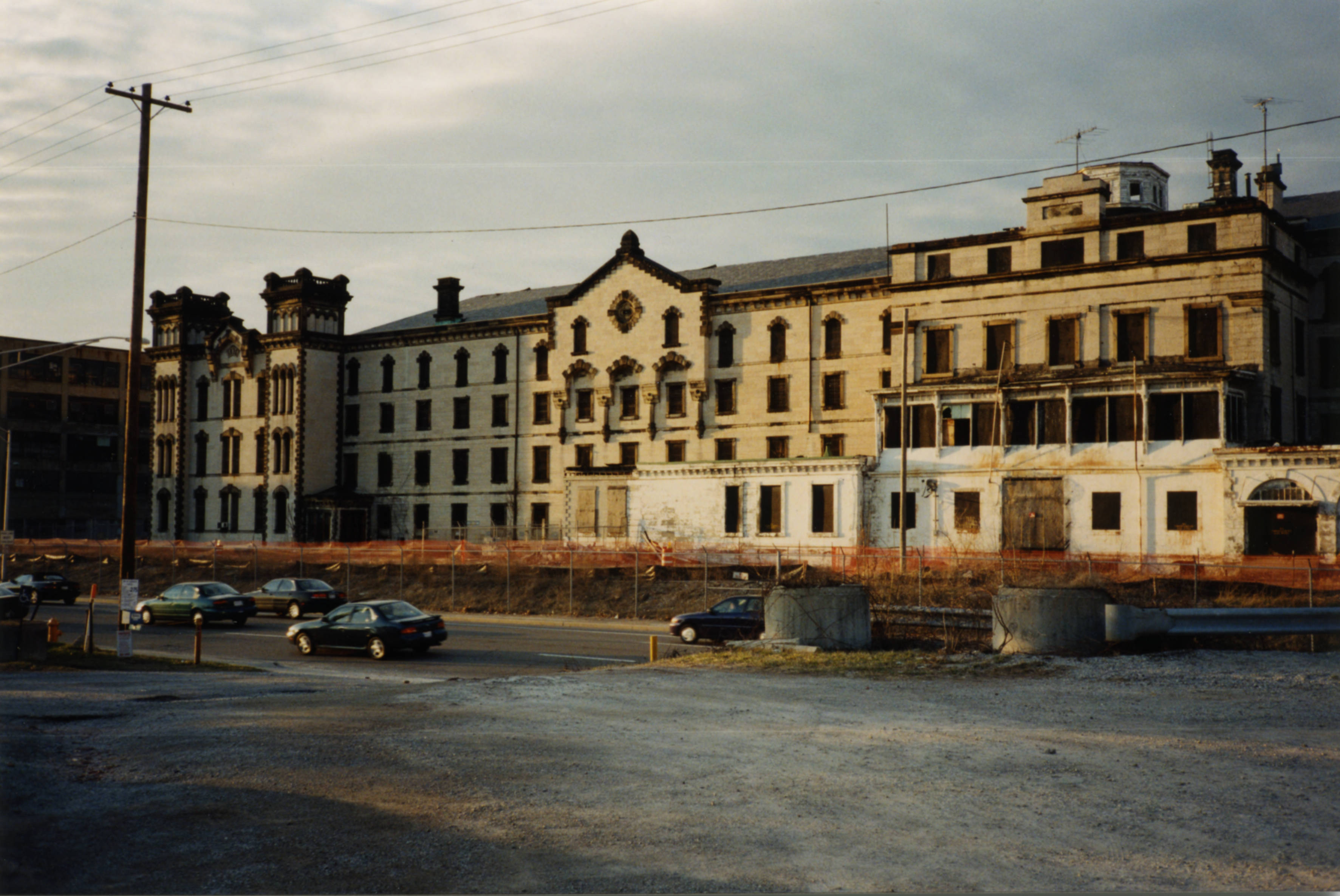
Main building in 1997
