= 96.9 FM =

The following radio stations broadcast on FM frequency 96.9 MHz:

== Argentina ==
- 9 digital in Concepción del Uruguay, Entre Ríos
- Bar in Alta Gracia, Córdoba
- Bien Argentina in Luján, Buenos Aires
- blu in Rio Cuarto, Córdoba
- LRM722 Dinámica in Esperanza, Santa Fe
- Big Radio in Casilda, Santa Fe
- Junin.net in Junín, Buenos Aires
- La 97 Radio Fueguina in Rio Grande, Tierra del Fuego
- La Deportiva in Rosario, Santa Fe
- LU17 in Trelew, Chubut
- LRP740 Nativa in Reconquista, Santa Fe
- Punta del Sauce in La Carlota, Córdoba
- Radio María in Villa Ramallo, Buenos Aires
- Radio María in Laboulaye, Córdoba
- Sauron in Pehuajó, Buenos Aires
- Satelital in La Banda, Santiago del Estero
- Tropical in Formosa
- Universal Monte Hermoso in Monte Hermoso, Buenos Aires

== Australia ==
- 2KY in Cooma, New South Wales
- 2SYD in Sydney, New South Wales
- ABC Western Victoria in Portland, Victoria
- 3SUN in Shepparton, Victoria
- Radio National in Albany, Western Australia
- Radio National in Grafton, New South Wales
- SBS Radio in Perth, Western Australia

== Canada (Channel 245) ==
- CBK-FM in Regina, Saskatchewan
- CBKF-FM-5 in North Battleford, Saskatchewan
- CBON-FM-23 in Manitouwadge, Ontario
- CBSE-FM in Sept-Iles, Quebec
- CBUC-FM in Salmon Arm, British Columbia
- CBUF-FM-3 in Terrace, British Columbia
- CBXK-FM in Fox Lake, Alberta
- CFIX-FM in Chicoutimi, Quebec
- CHEF-FM-3 in Lebel-sur-Quevillon, Quebec
- CIAM-FM-13 in Peerless Lake, Alberta
- CIAM-FM-17 in Chateh, Alberta
- CICP-FM in Cranberry Portage, Manitoba
- CIFR-FM in Fairford, Manitoba
- CISI-FM in South Indian Lake, Manitoba
- CJAQ-FM in Calgary, Alberta
- CJAX-FM in Vancouver, British Columbia
- CJMD-FM in Levis, Quebec
- CJXL-FM in Moncton, New Brunswick
- CKHC-FM in Toronto, Ontario
- CKLG-FM-1 in Whistler, British Columbia
- CKOI-FM in Verdun, Quebec
- CKQX-FM in Pelican Rapids, Manitoba
- CKUA-FM-5 in Peace River, Alberta
- VF2106 in Lac Brochet, Manitoba
- VF2107 in Poplar River, Manitoba
- VF2108 in Red Sucker Lake, Manitoba
- VF2109 in Tadoule Lake, Manitoba
- VF2167 in Pukatawagan, Manitoba
- VF2168 in Wabowden, Manitoba
- VF2175 in Gods River, Manitoba
- VF2196 in Berens River, Manitoba
- VF2198 in Garden Hill, Manitoba
- VF2199 in Shamattawa, Manitoba
- VF2220 in Brochet, Manitoba
- VF2222 in Nelson House, Manitoba
- VF2261 in Cormorant, Manitoba
- VF2262 in Duck Bay, Manitoba
- VF2263 in Grand Rapids, Manitoba
- VF2264 in Pikwitonei, Manitoba
- VF2265 in Split Lake, Manitoba
- VF2312 in Churchill, Manitoba
- VF2313 in Moose Lake, Manitoba
- VF2314 in Oxford House, Manitoba
- VF2319 in Fording River Mine Site, British Columbia
- VF2338 in Thicket Portage, Manitoba
- VF2339 in Bloodvein, Manitoba
- VF2369 in Lillooet, British Columbia
- VF2407 in Little Grand Rapids, Manitoba
- VF2423 in Lynn Lake, Manitoba
- VF2503 in Fisher River, Manitoba

== China ==
- CNR The Voice of China in Baotou and Quanzhou
- Beijing Classic 969 Radio

== El Salvador ==
- YSSS at San Salvador

== Guatemala (Channel 23) ==
- TGXA-FM in Guatemala City

== Malaysia ==
- My in Kuching, Sarawak
- Sinar in Ipoh, Kuala Kangsar, Central Perak, South Perak, Hilir Perak, North Selangor, Negeri Sembilan and South Selangor

== Mexico ==
- XEW-FM in Mexico City
- XHAP-FM in Ciudad Obregón, Sonora
- XHBUAP-FM in Puebla, Puebla
- XHCAP-FM in Zacapu, Michoacán
- XHCPH-FM in Hidalgo del Parral, Chihuahua
- XHHF-FM in Tampico, Tamaulipas
- XHKR-FM in Tuxtla Gutiérrez, Chiapas
- XHMUG-FM in Mexicali, Baja California
- XHNS-FM in Acapulco, Guerrero
- XHOAX-FM in Oaxaca, Oaxaca
- XHOD-FM in San Luis Potosí, San Luis Potosí
- XHPEDX-FM in Linares, Nuevo León
- XHPSEN-FM in Ensenada, Baja California
- XHSCCU-FM in Álvaro Obregon, Michoacan
- XHSIAV-FM in Chapulhuacán, Hidalgo
- XHTZ-FM in Xalapa, Veracruz
- XHUH-FM in San Juan Bautista Tuxtepec, Oaxaca
- XHUL-FM in Mérida, Yucatán
- XHVQ-FM in Culiacán, Sinaloa
- XHWU-FM in Matehuala, San Luis Potosí

== Nigeria ==
- Cool FM 96.9 in Abuja
- Cool FM 96.9 in Lagos
- Cool FM 96.9 in Kano

== Philippines ==
- DXKS-FM in Cagayan De Oro City
- DYXZ in Roxas City, Capiz is formerly Campus Radio Roxas (now vacant/defunct)

== Taiwan ==
- Transfer CNR The Voice of China in Kinmen County

== United Kingdom ==
- ALL FM in the Manchester area
- Capital Xtra in South London
- Hits Radio East Yorkshire & North Lincolnshire in Hull
- Heart North West in Preston
- Greatest Hits Radio Staffordshire & Cheshire in Stafford
- Heart East in Bedford
- Heart South in Peacehaven
- Northsound 1 in Aberdeen
- The Park FM in the New Forest

== United States (Channel 245) ==
- KACB-LP in College Station, Texas
- KBCR in Steamboat Springs, Colorado
- KCCY-FM in Pueblo, Colorado
- KDAG in Farmington, New Mexico
- KDLO in Watertown, South Dakota
- KEBT in Lost Hills, California
- KEPT-LP in Hayward, California
- KEZE in Spokane, Washington
- KFIX in Plainville, Kansas
- KFMN in Lihue, Hawaii
- KGLH-LP in Spicer, Minnesota
- KGPC-LP in Oakland, California
- KHBL-LP in Hannibal, Missouri
- KHDR in Lenwood, California
- KIAQ in Clarion, Iowa
- KKGL in Nampa, Idaho
- KKOW in Pittsburg, Kansas
- KMCM in Odessa, Texas
- KMFY in Grand Rapids, Minnesota
- KMRD-LP in Madrid, New Mexico
- KMTN in Jackson, Wyoming
- KMXP in Phoenix, Arizona
- KODX-LP in Seattle, Washington
- KPPC-LP in San Antonio, Texas
- KPTL-LP in Temecula, California
- KQBZ in Brownwood, Texas
- KQEA-LP in San Francisco Sunset, California
- KQEB-LP in San Francisco, California
- KQNS-LP in Haleiwa, Hawaii
- KQOB in Enid, Oklahoma
- KQPK-LP in McCook, Nebraska
- KQRB in Effingham, Kansas
- KQRV in Deer Lodge, Montana
- KROG in Grants Pass, Oregon
- KSAP-LP in Port Arthur, Texas
- KSCN (FM) in Pittsburg, Texas
- KSEG (FM) in Sacramento, California
- KSSW in Nashville, Arkansas
- KUPH in Mountain View, Missouri
- KVMV in Mcallen, Texas
- KWAV in Monterey, California
- KWLR in Bigelow, Arkansas
- KWYU in Christine, Texas
- KXBJ in El Campo, Texas
- KXSS in Amarillo, Texas
- KXTJ-LP in San Antonio, Texas
- KYBU in Covelo, California
- KYSC in Fairbanks, Alaska
- KYYO in McCleary, Washington
- KZBK in Brookfield, Missouri
- KZKX in Seward, Nebraska
- KZMZ in Alexandria, Louisiana
- KZTA in Naches, Washington
- WBPW in Presque Isle, Maine
- WBQT in Boston, Massachusetts
- WBTI in Lexington, Michigan
- WDDJ in Paducah, Kentucky
- WDJR in Hartford, Alabama
- WEHN in East Hampton, New York
- WFAJ in Nassawadox, Virginia
- WFPG in Atlantic City, New Jersey
- WFVS-FM in Reynolds, Georgia
- WGKS in Paris, Kentucky
- WGRF in Buffalo, New York
- WHPZ in Bremen, Indiana
- WHYR-LP in Baton Rouge, Louisiana
- WINK in Fort Myers, Florida
- WIWF in Charleston, South Carolina
- WJGL in Jacksonville, Florida
- WJLM-LP in Altoona, Wisconsin
- WJNU-LP in Cookeville, Tennessee
- WKEZ in Tavernier, Florida
- WKKT in Statesville, North Carolina
- WKLO in Hardinsburg, Indiana
- WLAN in Lancaster, Pennsylvania
- WLAV in Grand Rapids, Michigan
- WLRD in Willard, Ohio
- WLXY-LP in Chelsea, Alabama
- WMKI-LP in Terre Haute, Indiana
- WNKL in Wauseon, Ohio
- WNRT in Manati, Puerto Rico
- WOUR in Utica, New York
- WPLW-FM in Goldsboro, North Carolina
- WPRF-LP in New Britain, Connecticut
- WRDO in Fitzgerald, Georgia
- WRRB in Arlington, New York
- WRRK in Braddock, Pennsylvania
- WRRQ-LP in Cocoa, Florida
- WRSA in Holly Pond, Alabama
- WSIG in Mount Jackson, Virginia
- WSJB-LP in St. Joseph, Michigan
- WSMP-LP in Magee, Mississippi
- WTCD in Indianola, Mississippi
- WTHB in Wrens, Georgia
- WTJC-LP in Charlotte Amalie, Virgin Islands
- WUCH in Monterey, Tennessee
- WUHS-LP in West Union, Ohio
- WULD-LP in Waterloo, Wisconsin
- WVBC-LP in Bessemer, Alabama
- WVVV in Williamstown, West Virginia
- WWCM in Standish, Michigan
- WWDV in Zion, Illinois
- WWSA-LP in St. Albans, West Virginia
- WWTJ-LP in Watertown, New York
- WWUZ in Bowling Green, Virginia
- WWWO-LP in Miami, Florida
- WWWX in Oshkosh, Wisconsin
- WXBQ in Bristol, Virginia
- WXLP in Moline, Illinois
- WYDA in Troy, Ohio
- WYIR-LP in Baugh City, Indiana
- WZBF (FM) in Ridgebury, Pennsylvania

== Vietnam ==
- Long An radio, Long An province
