= Williamston, West Virginia =

There is no Williamston in West Virginia. You may be looking for:

- Williamson, West Virginia on the Tug Fork River
- Williamstown, West Virginia on the Ohio River
