= KACB =

KACB may refer to

- Klaus Advanced Computing Building at the Georgia Institute of Technology
- KACB-LP, a low-power radio station (96.9 FM) licensed to College Station, Texas, United States
- KLWB (TV), a television station (channel 50) licensed to serve New Iberia, Louisiana, United States, which held the call sign KACB-TV from 2004 to 2005
- KSAN-TV, a television station (channel 16, virtual 3) licensed to serve San Angelo, Texas, which held the call sign KACB-TV from 1962 to 2003
- Antrim County Airport (ICAO code KACB)
