= WMKI =

WMKI may refer to:

- WMKI-LP, a low-power radio station (96.9 FM) licensed to serve Terre Haute, Indiana, United States
- WBIX, a radio station (1260 AM) licensed to serve Boston, Massachusetts, United States, which held the call sign WMKI from 1999 to 2015
- Sultan Azlan Shah Airport, the primary airport serving the city of Ipoh in the Malaysian state of Perak, which bears the ICAO airport code "WMKI".
