= WEVX =

WEVX may refer to:

- WEVX-LP, a low-power radio station (95.1 FM) licensed to serve Derry, New Hampshire, United States
- WMKI-LP, a low-power radio station (96.9 FM) licensed to serve Terre Haute, Indiana, United States, which held the call sign WEVX-LP in 2014 and from 2017 to 2018
- WJEK, a radio station (95.3 FM) licensed to serve Rantoul, Illinois, United States, which held the call sign WEVX from 2002 to 2006
