= WPRF =

WPRF may refer to:

- WPRF-LP, a low-power radio station (96.9 FM) licensed to serve New Britain, Connecticut, United States
- WGUO, a radio station (94.9 FM) licensed to serve Reserve, Louisiana, United States, which held the call sign WPRF from 2003 to 2012
