= WTJC =

- For the low-power FM radio station in Charlotte Amille, Virgin Islands, see WTJC-LP.
- For the former shortwave radio station, see Fundamental Broadcasting Network.
