= KGLH =

KGLH may refer to:

- Mid Delta Regional Airport (ICAO code KGLH)
- KGLH-LP, a low-power radio station (96.9 FM) licensed to Spicer, Minnesota, United States
