= WXXR =

WXXR may refer to:

- WMKI-LP, a radio station (97.3 FM) licensed to Terre Haute, Indiana, United States, which held the call sign WXXR-LP from 2014 to 2017
- For the Fredericktown, Ohio, radio station, that held the WXXR callsign from 2005-2011, see WMAN-FM.
- For the Seelyville, Indiana, radio station, that held the WXXR callsign from 2012-2014, see WHLR.
