= WVVV =

Radio station in Williamstown, West Virginia

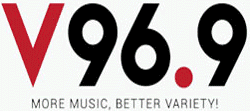
- Williamstown, West Virginia; United States
- Broadcast area: Parkersburg-Marietta
- Frequency: 96.9 MHz
- Branding: V96.9

Programming
- Format: Adult contemporary

Ownership
- Owner: Seven Ranges Radio Co., Inc.

History
- First air date: 2000
- Call sign meaning: V 96.9

Technical information
- Licensing authority: FCC
- Facility ID: 77779
- Class: A
- ERP: 3,500 watts
- HAAT: 129 meters (423 feet)
- Transmitter coordinates: 39°20′18″N 81°30′1″W

Links
- Public license information: Public file; LMS
- Webcast: Listen live
- Website: v969radio.net

WVVV (96.9 FM) is a radio station broadcasting an adult contemporary format. Licensed to Williamstown, West Virginia, United States, it serves the Parkersburg-Marietta area. The station is currently owned by Seven Ranges Radio Co. of St. Marys, West Virginia.
