= XHPEDX-FM =

Radio station in Linares, Nuevo León

- Linares, Nuevo León; Mexico
- Frequency: 96.9 FM
- Branding: Radio La Siembra

Programming
- Format: Spanish Christian

Ownership
- Owner: Iglesia Castillo del Rey; (Delia Rodríguez Arreola)

History
- First air date: December 2018
- Call sign meaning: (templated callsign)

Technical information
- Class: AA

Links
- Webcast: Listen live
- Website: Radio La Siembra Website

XHPEDX-FM is a radio station on 96.9 FM in Linares, Nuevo León. Mexico. The station is owned by Delia Rodríguez Arreola, a pastor of the Iglesia Castillo del Rey church, which programs a Christian format named Radio La Siembra.

== History ==
Rodríguez Arreola filed for a social station in Linares in March 2014. The concession was awarded on May 22, 2018.
