= Tomlinson Mansion =

Historic house in West Virginia, United States

- U.S. National Register of Historic Places
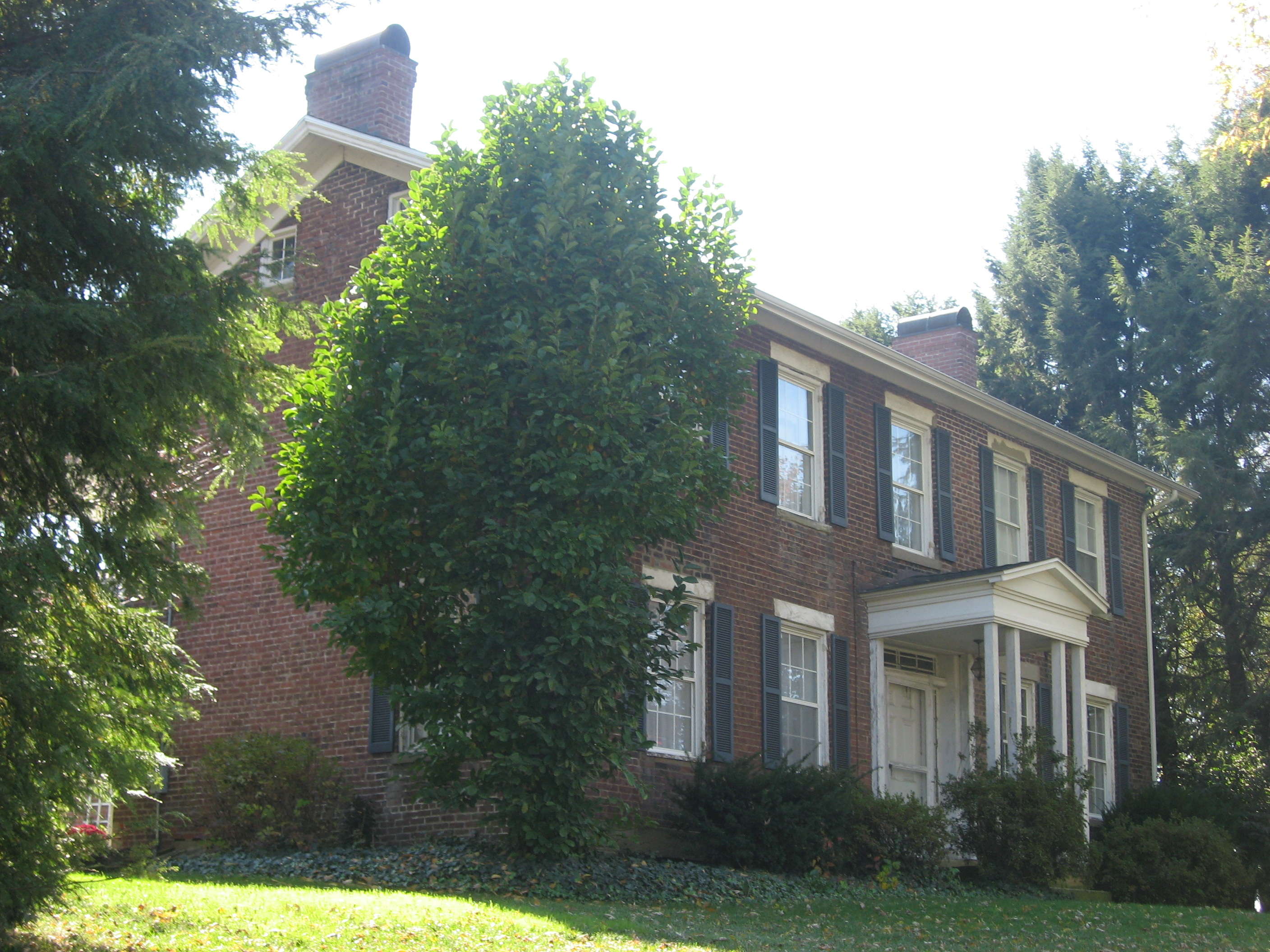
- Front of the house

- Location within West Virginia Location within the United States
- Location: 901 W. 3rd St., Williamstown, West Virginia
- Coordinates: 39°24′3″N 81°27′50″W
- Area: 1 acre (0.40 ha)
- Built: 1839
- Built by: Tomlinson, Joseph III
- NRHP reference No.: 74002022
- Added to NRHP: July 24, 1974

Tomlinson Mansion is a historic home located at Williamstown, Wood County, West Virginia. It was built in 1839, and is a two-story, L-shaped brick building with a slate-covered gable roof. The front facade features a small, pediment-like roof above the front door that is supported by four rectangular columns. It is the oldest home in Williamstown and its most notable guest was John James Audubon, who stayed at the Tomlinson Mansion while collecting material on the bluebird and other birds native to the area.

It was listed on the National Register of Historic Places in 1974.

== See also ==
- National Register of Historic Places listings in Wood County, West Virginia
