= Henderson Hall Historic District =

District in Boaz, West Virginia, US

- U.S. National Register of Historic Places
- U.S. Historic district
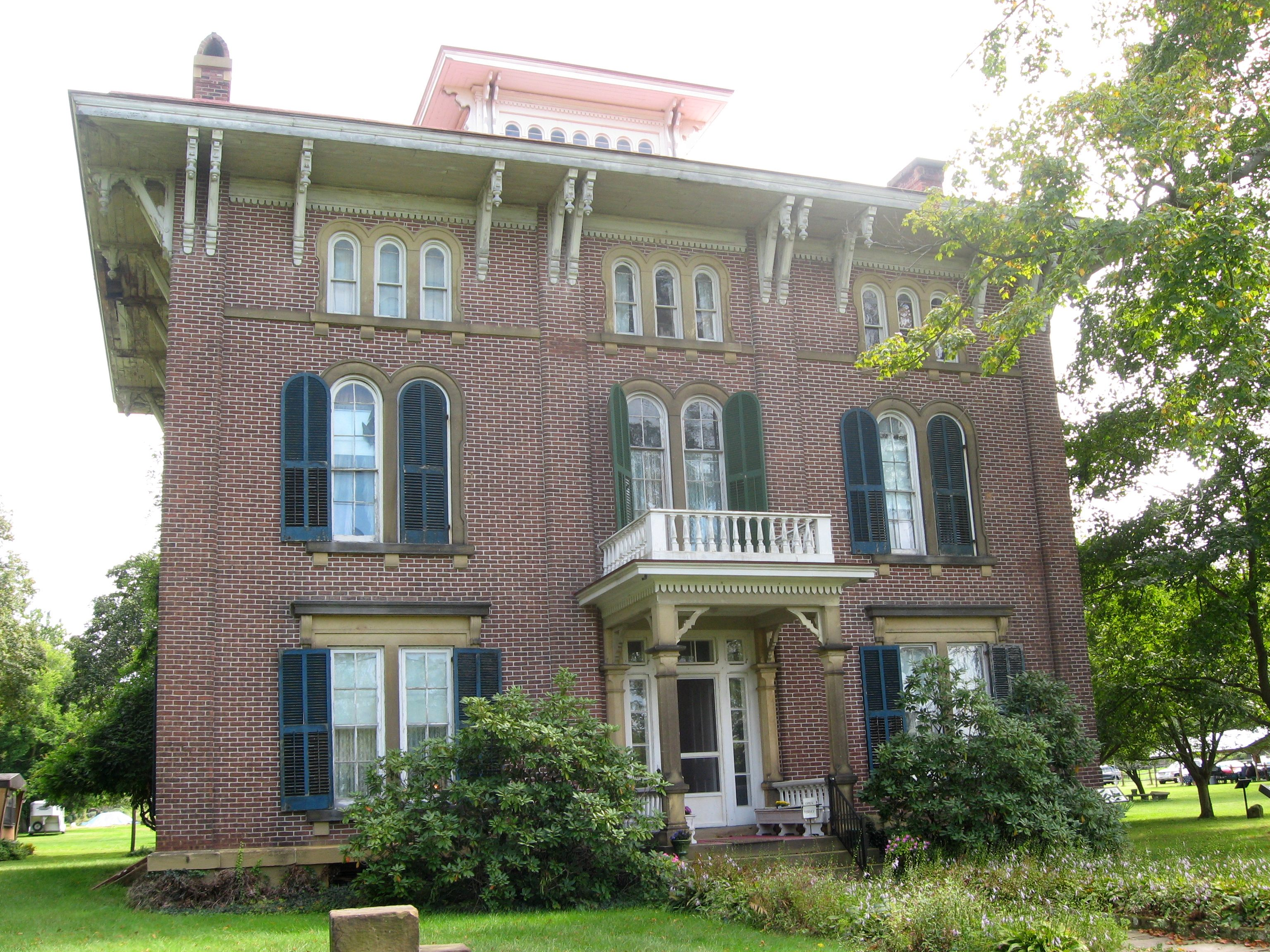

- Location within West Virginia Location within the United States
- Location: CR 21/2 off WV 14, near Williamstown, West Virginia
- Coordinates: 39°22′40″N 81°28′58″W
- Area: 65 acres (26 ha)
- Built: earliest portions in 1836
- Architect: J. M. Slocomb
- Architectural style: Italianate
- NRHP reference No.: 86000811
- Added to NRHP: April 17, 1986

Henderson Hall Historic District is a National Register of Historic Places (NRHP)-listed historic district in Boaz, Wood County, West Virginia. The primary contributing property is Henderson Hall, a home in the Italianate style from the first half of the 19th century. Other residences at the site are a tenant house from the end of the 19th century, and "Woodhaven", the 1877 home of Henry Clay Henderson. Additional structures include a smokehouse, two corn cribs, a carriage barn that also served as a schoolhouse, a scale house used for storing agricultural equipment, and two barns. Also included within the district are the 19th-century Henderson family cemetery, a wall, a mounting block, and three mounds associated with the pre-Columbian Adena culture.

Henderson Hall was a significant plantation before the American Civil War, and the farm's local significance lasted until about 1935. The Hendersons, who developed the farm, lived at the site until 1984, when cousin of the family Michael Rolston became the owner. On April 17, 1986, Henderson Hall was listed on the NRHP. Now used a museum, the home contains a sizable collection of historic items. Historically, the farm was associated with the name Pohick.

== History ==
During the late 1700s and early 1800s, the Henderson family was a major landowner in the area. Several members were influential farmers who helped incorporate what is now Wood County, West Virginia, in 1798. (Note: What is now the state of West Virginia was part of the state of Virginia until 1863.) By the time of the 1826 marriage of George W. Henderson and Elizabeth Ann Tomlinson Henderson, the family controlled about 2,000 acres (810 ha) in Wood County alone, as well as more land in other parts of the region. Before the development of Henderson Hall itself in the late 1850s, the area was known as Pohick, a name which is believed to be of Native American origin. During the period before the American Civil War, George Washington Henderson and three of his sons developed land in the bottomground along the Ohio River into a plantation and raised cash crops, cattle, and horses. The plantation used slave labor, and Salmon P. Chase made a legal defense of a man accused of aiding the escape of some of the Hendersons' slaves. In addition to the site's historic use as a farm, prehistoric mounds at the site have been identified with the Adena culture.

Under the name Pohick, the site was listed as a stop on the Ohio River Railroad in 1899. While development at Henderson Hall continued until after the American Civil War, and Jock B. Henderson, son of George W. Henderson, ran the farm until the 1930s, the farm decreased in importance after 1935. A 1941 Federal Writers' Project associated the name Pohick with the older portion of Henderson Hall, and stated that the farm was related to the "river village" of Hendersons, which had a population of 25. The last Henderson daughter, Lorna, died in 1984, and Michael Rolston, a graphic designer from New York City and a cousin of the Hendersons, moved into the home. Rolston held tours of the home on Christmas and weekends, and was able to have the site listed on the National Register of Historic Places (NRHP) on April 17, 1986. The listing included 10 buildings on 65 acres (26 ha). After Rolston died in 2007, ownership of the site passed to the Oil & Gas Museum in Parkersburg, West Virginia, to be developed into a museum.

== Features ==
=== Contributing properties ===
==== Henderson Hall ====
The key contributing property to the district is Henderson Hall. The oldest part of the building is a brick structure built in 1836. This structure was enlarged between 1856 and 1859 to produce Henderson Hall. Built in the Italianate style, the 1850s portion of the structure was designed by J. M. Slocomb and constructed with brick, stone, and timber sourced from the farm. Significant features of the architectural style include deep overhanging eaves decorated with bracketwork, hoodmould decoration around windows, balustrades and stone columns associated with the porch, and a belvedere in the center of the roof. The newer portion of the house incorporates paired windows in three bays. The home's rooms add up to 8,000 square feet (740 m^{2}) of space. The home contains sizable collections of historic items, including material from the 1860 United States presidential election, a wedding dress from 1802, and a piano from 1873.

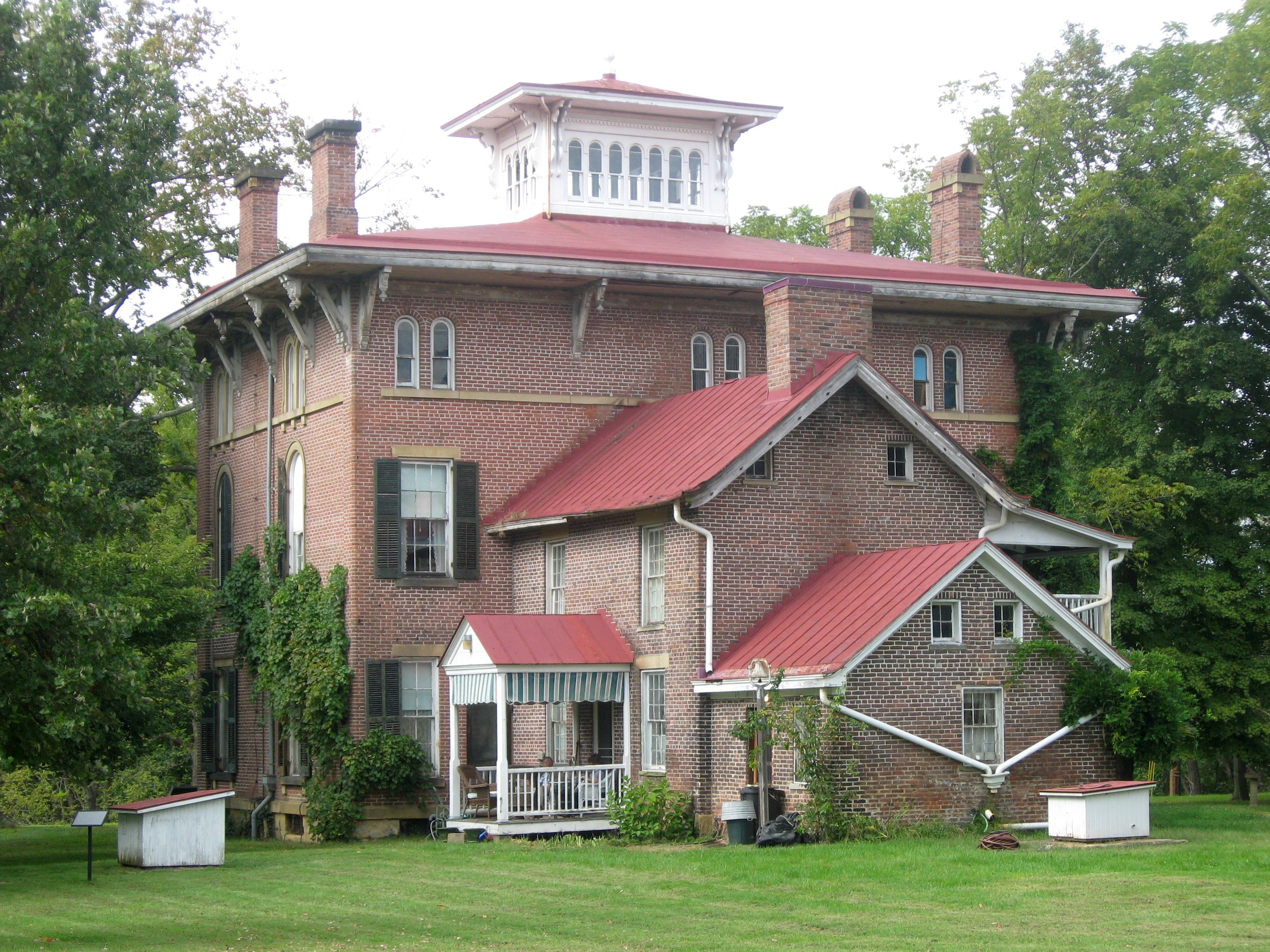
Back view of Henderson Hall

The 1836 portion of the structure is two stories tall and has a gabled roof. A water table is included as part of the foundation of the newer addition, which is three stories tall. Both the main structure and the belvedere for the 1850s addition have hipped roofs. When the district was nominated for inclusion on the NRHP in 1986, it was noted that the interior structure of Henderson Hall had seen few alterations aside from the addition of gas and electricity. A 2003 newspaper report noted that the house's parlor still had the original wallpaper intact. On the exterior, gutter leaks had led to water damage and rot, and the older portion of the structure was afflicted with rising damp.

==== Other contributing properties ====
A number of other structures within the district are designated as contributing properties. A one-story log smokehouse has a gabled roof and dates to about 1836; it was listed as being in fair condition at the time of the NRHP application. What is believed to be one of the oldest extant schools in West Virginia is also on the property. The building was constructed in around 1860 and also functioned as a carriage barn. Original benches and school supplies were still preserved in the schoolhouse as of 2019. Multiple agricultural buildings are classified as contributing properties, including two corncribs, a scale house, and two barns. Of the two corncribs, one dates to 1836 and suffered a roof collapse, while the other is from 1856 and was in better condition at the time of the NRHP nomination. The scale house stored equipment and dates to about 1856, while the two barns were from approximately 1850 and 1895. Both barns were in poor condition in 1986.

In addition, two other residences are included as contributing properties; both date to the late 19th century. The first is a one-and-a-half story farmhouse used to house tenant farmers. The tenant house dates from the period between 1895 and 1900 and has a slate roof. The other is "Woodhaven" house, which was built by Henry Clay Henderson around 1877. Woodhaven is two stories tall, with an L-shaped floor plan and gabled roofs. First built for the Henry Clay Henderson family, it later housed the George Travis Henderson family. Several non-residence features are also classified as contributing properties. The Henderson Cemetery dates from the early 1800s and contains interments from both the Henderson and Tomlinson families. A stone wall from the mid-1800s constructed of locally sourced stone and divides the complex of buildings from the farmland along the Ohio River. To the east of Henderson Hall is a sandstone mounting block, which was used to make mounting horses easier. Also contributing to the district are three mounds from the Adena culture. Mound A is the largest and is located southwest of Henderson Hall. Mounds B and C are smaller and are located east of Mound A and north of Henderson Hall, respectively.

=== Noncontributing properties ===
The railroad line of the Baltimore and Ohio Railroad passes through part of the historic district in the farmland near the Ohio River. The railroad's right-of-way also passes through the district. The railroad and right of way are not part of the district's historic significance. The NRHP nomination form describes the railroad as being inobtrusive to the site.

== See also ==
- National Register of Historic Places listings in Wood County, West Virginia

== Sources ==
- Collins, Rodney S. (1986). "National Register of Historic Places Inventory Nomination Form: Henderson Hall Historic District" (PDF). West Virginia Division of Culture and History. Archived from the original (PDF) on April 27, 2021.
- Kenny, Hamill (1945). West Virginia Place Names: Their Origin and Meaning, Including the Nomenclature of the Streams and Mountains. Piedmont, West Virginia: The Place Names Press. OCLC 561115988.
- West Virginia: A Guide to the Mountain State. New York, New York: Oxford University Press. 1941. ISBN 9781603540476. OCLC 946228234.
- White, I. C. (1899). West Virginia Geological Survey. Vol. 1. Morgantown, West Virginia: The Post Printing House.
