= XHWU-FM =

Radio station in Matehuala, San Luis Potosí

- Matehuala, San Luis Potosí; Mexico
- Frequency: 96.9 FM
- Branding: La Poderosa

Programming
- Format: Grupera

Ownership
- Owner: Boone Menchaca family; (Radio XHWU, S.A. de C.V.)

History
- First air date: November 26, 1971 (concession)

Technical information
- Licensing authority: CRT
- Class: B1
- ERP: 25 kW
- HAAT: −34.18 m (−112.1 ft)
- Transmitter coordinates: 23°38′47″N 100°38′32″W

XHWU-FM is a radio station on 96.9 FM in Matehuala, San Luis Potosí. It carries a grupera format known as La Poderosa.

== History ==
XEWU-AM 1400 received its concession on November 26, 1971. In 1998, it was authorized to move to 1150 kHz with 500 watts, but it did not do so until toward the end of its life on AM.

XEWU received approval to migrate to FM in 2011.
