= XHCPH-FM =

Radio station in Hidalgo del Parral, Chihuahua

- Hidalgo del Parral, Chihuahua; Mexico
- Frequency: 96.9 FM
- Branding: La Tremenda

Programming
- Format: Regional Mexican

Ownership
- Owner: Grupo Garza Limón; (Garzalr, S.A. de C.V.)

History
- First air date: June 4, 1990 (concession)

Technical information
- Licensing authority: CRT
- Class: C1
- ERP: 50 kW
- HAAT: 150.7 m (494 ft)
- Transmitter coordinates: 26°55′00.32″N 105°39′45.55″W

Links
- Webcast: Listen live
- Website: latremenda.com.mx

XHCPH-FM is a radio station in Hidalgo del Parral, Chihuahua, Mexico. Broadcasting on 96.9 FM from a transmitter on Cerro Púlpito, XHCPH is owned by Grupo Garza Limón and carries a Regional Mexican format known as La Tremenda.

== History ==
The station's concession was awarded in 1990. Until 2015, XHCPH operated with an effective radiated power of 100 kW; it received authorization that year to change ERP to 50 kW.
