= XHKR-FM =

Radio station in Tuxtla Gutiérrez, Chiapas, Mexico

- Tuxtla Gutiérrez, Chiapas; Mexico
- Frequency: 96.9 FM
- Branding: Máxima

Programming
- Format: Adult contemporary

Ownership
- Owner: Radio S.A.; (Radio XHKR-FM, S.A. de C.V.)

History
- First air date: June 18, 1980 (concession)
- Former call signs: XHTG-FM

Technical information
- ERP: 3.29 kW

Links
- Website: www.maxima.com.mx

XHKR-FM is a radio station on 96.9 FM in Tuxtla Gutiérrez, Chiapas, Mexico. The station is owned by Radio S.A. and carries its Máxima adult contemporary format.

== History ==
XHTG-FM received its concession on June 18, 1980. It was owned by Francisco Águilar Trujillo. By 2000, it had changed its callsign to XHKR. (The station is not related to the current XHTG, also in Tuxtla, which migrated from the AM band.)

In 2013 the Águilar family sold the station to Radio S.A. and transferred ownership in the concessionaire to the Quiñones family.
