= KFMN =

- Lihue, Hawaii; United States
- Broadcast area: Kauai
- Frequency: 96.9 MHz
- Branding: FM97

Programming
- Format: Adult contemporary
- Affiliations: AP Radio

Ownership
- Owner: Richard Bergson; (Pacific Radio Group, Inc.)

History
- First air date: 1968

Technical information
- Licensing authority: FCC
- Facility ID: 21843
- Class: C1
- ERP: 100,000 watts
- HAAT: 122.0 meters
- Transmitter coordinates: 21°59′54″N 159°25′35″W

Links
- Public license information: Public file; LMS
- Website: kauaifm97.com

KFMN (96.9 FM) is a radio station broadcasting an adult contemporary music format. Licensed to Lihue, Hawaii, United States. The station serves the Kauai area and parts of Oahu. The station is owned by Pacific Media Group, and features programming from AP Radio. KFMN-FM1 in Waimea provides an on frequency simulcast of KFMN Lihue.
