= WYIR-LP =

- Baugh City, Indiana; United States
- Broadcast area: Evansville
- Frequency: 96.9 MHz
- Branding: The Real Alternative

Programming
- Format: Christian Rock

Ownership
- Owner: Youth Incorporated of Southern Indiana

History
- First air date: 2005

Technical information
- Licensing authority: FCC
- Facility ID: 123501
- Class: L1
- ERP: 58 watts
- HAAT: 39.3 meters (129 ft)
- Transmitter coordinates: 38°3′19.00″N 87°26′30.00″W

Links
- Public license information: LMS
- Webcast: WYIR-LP Webstream
- Website: WYIR-LP Online

WYIR-LP (96.9 FM, "Your New Rock Alternative") is a low-power FM radio station broadcasting a Christian rock music format. Licensed to Baugh City, Indiana, United States, the station serves the Evansville area. The station is currently owned by Youth Incorporated of Southern Indiana.

== History ==
The Federal Communications Commission issued a construction permit for the station on June 18, 2003. The station was issued the WYIR-LP call sign on August 21, 2003, and received its license to cover on July 19, 2005.
