= KEPT-LP =

- Hayward, California; United States
- Frequency: 96.9 MHz

Ownership
- Owner: Calvary Chapel of Hayward Inc.

History
- First air date: September 10, 2014

Technical information
- Licensing authority: FCC
- Facility ID: 193012
- Class: L1
- ERP: 100 watts
- HAAT: 20 meters (66 ft)
- Transmitter coordinates: 37°35′06″N 121°59′08″W

Links
- Public license information: LMS
- Webcast: Listen live
- Website: keptfm.com

KEPT-LP is a low power radio station broadcasting from Hayward, California. It is owned by Calvary Chapel of Hayward, Inc.

== History ==
KEPT-LP began broadcasting on February 14, 2015.
