= KXTJ-LP =

Low-power radio station in San Antonio, Texas

Coordinates: 29.4860°N 98.6397°W

San Antonio, Texas; United States
- Broadcast area: San Antonio, Texas
- Frequency: 96.9 MHz
- Branding: Classic Hits 96.9

Programming
- Format: Classic hits

Ownership
- Owner: San Antonio Public Safety Alliance

History
- First air date: May 19, 2014

Technical information
- Licensing authority: FCC
- Facility ID: 193570
- Class: L1
- ERP: 86 watts
- HAAT: 9.9 m (32 ft)

Links
- Public license information: LMS
- Webcast: Listen Live
- Website: classichitssa.com

KXTJ-LP is a low-power FM radio station serving the northwest side of San Antonio, Texas. It is known as Classic Hits 96.9 with a format of 1980s, and 1990s music.
