= CKHC-FM =

Radio station at Humber College in Toronto, Ontario

Coordinates: 43°43′43″N 79°36′30″W

- Toronto, Ontario; Canada
- Broadcast area: Rexdale
- Frequency: 96.9 MHz
- Branding: 96.9 Radio Humber

Programming
- Format: Campus radio

Ownership
- Owner: Humber Polytechnic

History
- First air date: 2004
- Call sign meaning: Humber College

Technical information
- Licensing authority: CRTC
- Class: A1
- ERP: 60 watts
- HAAT: 31 metres (102 ft)

Links
- Website: radio.humber.ca

CKHC-FM is a Canadian radio station, broadcasting at 96.9 FM in Toronto, Ontario. It is the campus radio station of the city's Humber Polytechnic. CKHC's studios and transmitter are located at the Humber Polytechnic's North Campus building on Humber College Boulevard.

The station was licensed by the CRTC in 2004 as a developmental FM station. CKHC was the first radio station in Canada to voluntarily adopt a 100 per cent Canadian content playlist. In 2007, the station was approved for a campus instructional license and an increase in power. It can now be heard at a radius of 10 km (6 miles) around the Humber North campus. The station is known on-air as 96.9 Radio Humber.

Programming includes a daily news magazine show @Humber, which airs Monday to Friday at noon and again at 6 p.m. Jazz from Humber's renowned music program at 8 a.m. and midnight, along with a daily sports show, Humber Sportsdrive at 5:30 p.m.
