= WWSA-LP =

- St. Albans, West Virginia; United States
- Broadcast area: St. Albans; Cross Lanes; Nitro; Tornado
- Frequency: 96.9 MHz
- Branding: Retro 96.9

Programming
- Format: Oldies

Ownership
- Owner: City of St. Albans

History
- First air date: June 2016
- Call sign meaning: Saint Albans

Technical information
- Licensing authority: FCC
- Facility ID: 194540
- Class: L1
- ERP: 100 watts
- HAAT: −29 meters (−95 ft)
- Transmitter coordinates: 38°23′12.60″N 81°50′17.70″W

Links
- Public license information: LMS
- Webcast: WWSA-LP Webstream
- Website: WWSA-LP Online

WWSA-LP is an oldies formatted broadcast radio station licensed to St. Albans, West Virginia, serving St. Albans, Cross Lanes, Nitro, and Tornado in West Virginia. WWSA-LP is owned and operated by City of St. Albans.

== Programming and Studios ==
Along with the station's Oldies format, WWSA-LP also broadcasts features regarding the history of St. Albans. Interviews with "individuals who have historical backgrounds related to the city" are also heard on the station.

The Museum of Radio and Technology, located in nearby Huntington, West Virginia, donated equipment to the station and built a "vintage studio" in the St. Albans City Hall. The station initially operated from a "broom closet" at the City Municipal Building. In 2017, the studio was moved to the St. Albans Chamber of Commerce at 412 6th Avenue.
