= KMRD-LP =

- Madrid, New Mexico; United States
- Broadcast area: Madrid, New Mexico; Los Cerrillos, New Mexico
- Frequency: 96.9 MHz
- Branding: Madrid Community Radio

Programming
- Format: Variety

Ownership
- Owner: KMRD Inc

History
- First air date: October 29, 2014
- Call sign meaning: Madrid

Technical information
- Licensing authority: FCC
- Facility ID: 194010
- Class: L1
- ERP: 35 watts
- HAAT: 50 meters (160 ft)
- Transmitter coordinates: 35°24′1.60″N 106°9′14.60″W

Links
- Public license information: LMS
- Webcast: Listen live
- Website: kmrd.fm

KMRD-LP is a listener-supported, Low Power FM, independent community radio station licensed to Madrid, New Mexico, serving Madrid, Los Cerrillos, and Southern Santa Fe County. KMRD-LP was founded as a project of the Madrid Cultural Projects in 2013. KMRD is now owned and operated by KMRD Inc. KMRD volunteers installed transmission equipment with the help of the Prometheus Radio Project in 2014.
