= WHYR-LP =

- Baton Rouge, Louisiana; United States
- Broadcast area: Baton Rouge
- Frequency: 96.9 MHz
- Branding: Baton Rouge Community Radio

Programming
- Affiliations: Pacifica Radio Network

Ownership
- Owner: Baton Rouge Progressive Network

Technical information
- Licensing authority: FCC
- Facility ID: 123985
- Class: L1
- ERP: 25 watts
- HAAT: 59 meters (194 ft)
- Transmitter coordinates: 30°26′59″N 91°10′14″W

Links
- Public license information: LMS
- Webcast: Listen live
- Website: whyr.org

WHYR-LP (96.9 FM) (sometimes pronounced "wire") is a community radio station licensed to Baton Rouge, Louisiana, United States. The station is owned by the Baton Rouge Progressive Network.

WHYR-LP airs an eclectic mix of music, from Cajun music and local hip-hop to traditional blues, folk, gospel, and country. The station is affiliated with Pacifica Radio.

== History ==
- June 2000: Baton Rouge Progressive Network (BRPN) applies to the Federal Communications Commission (FCC) to operate a low power FM radio station.
- September 2004: FCC awards BRPN with a construction permit and assigns the call letters WHYR‐LP.
- November 2005: An unaffiliated entity, who also applied for a permit in 2000 but did not receive one, files unauthorized documents with the FCC to transfer control of WHYR‐LP to them.
- March 2006: BRPN becomes aware of the unauthorized transfer and alerts the FCC.
- January 2010: The FCC fines the unauthorized entity and returns control of WHYR‐LP to BRPN.
- February 2011: BRPN forms the Radio Advisory Council (RAC) to make managerial and operational decisions related to the station.
- February 2011: A transmission site is secured.
- March 2011: Antenna purchased.
- April 2011: Transmitter and STL equipment purchased. The website http://www.whyr.org is launched.
- June 2011: Leased 1623 Main Street in Baton Rouge as site for studio. On June 24, 2011: began broadcasting.
