= KGLH-LP =

- Spicer, Minnesota; United States
- Broadcast area: Spicer / New London
- Frequency: 96.9 MHz
- Branding: KGLH Radio

Programming
- Format: Religious

Ownership
- Owner: Hope Presbyterian Church

History
- First air date: 2003
- Call sign meaning: Green Lake Hope

Technical information
- Licensing authority: FCC
- Facility ID: 126735
- Class: L1
- ERP: 100 watts
- HAAT: 30.0 meters (98.4 ft)
- Transmitter coordinates: 45°15′32″N 94°56′29″W

Links
- Public license information: LMS
- Website: KGLH-LP website

KGLH-LP (96.9 FM) is a radio station licensed to Spicer, Minnesota, United States. The station is currently owned by Hope Presbyterian Church and broadcasts religious programming including music as well as live broadcast of church services.
