= WPRF-LP =

- New Britain, Connecticut; United States
- Frequency: 96.9 MHz
- Branding: Restauracion 96.9 FM

Programming
- Format: Spanish religious

Ownership
- Owner: La Nueva Radio Restauracion 1620 AM Inc

Technical information
- Licensing authority: FCC
- Facility ID: 193314
- Class: LP1
- ERP: 100 watts
- HAAT: 20 metres (66 ft)
- Transmitter coordinates: 41°40′09.6″N 72°45′58.7″W

Links
- Public license information: LMS
- Webcast: Listen live
- Website: www.restauracion96.com

WPRF-LP (96.9 FM, "Restauracion 96.9 FM") is a radio station licensed to serve the community of New Britain, Connecticut. The station is owned by La Nueva Radio Restauracion 1620 AM Inc and airs a Spanish religious format.

The station was assigned the WPRF-LP call letters by the Federal Communications Commission on October 17, 2014.
