= WTJC-LP =

Radio station in Charlotte Amalie, U.S. Virgin Islands

- Charlotte Amalie, U.S. Virgin Islands; United States
- Frequency: 96.9 MHz

Programming
- Format: Religious/Caribbean Gospel

Ownership
- Owner: Methodist Church St. Thomas St. John Circuit Inc.

History
- First air date: August 28, 2003
- Call sign meaning: Wesley, Trinity, St. John and Christchurch: congregations in the St. Thomas-St. John Methodist Circuit

Technical information
- Licensing authority: FCC
- Facility ID: 135689
- Class: L1
- ERP: 1 watt
- HAAT: 292.6 meters (960 ft)
- Transmitter coordinates: 18°19′54″N 64°54′39″W

Links
- Public license information: LMS
- Website: wtjclpfm.com

WTJC-LP (96.9 FM) is a radio station licensed to serve Charlotte Amalie, U.S. Virgin Islands. The station is owned by Methodist Church St. Thomas St. John Circuit Inc. It airs a Religious/Caribbean Gospel music format featuring a mix of teaching programs and Christian music. While many low-power FM stations cover only a limited area, due to the size of the U.S. Virgin Islands this station covers most of the population with a city-grade signal.

This station has been assigned the WTJC-LP call sign by the Federal Communications Commission since April 28, 2003.

WTJC-LP's broadcast center is located in the Christchurch Methodist Education and Outreach Complex in Market Square on St. Thomas. In 2004, in celebration of its first anniversary of broadcasting, this Methodist Radio Ministry station held a Praise-a-thon.
