= KACB-LP =

Catholic low-power radio station in College Station, Texas

- College Station, Texas; United States
- Frequency: 96.9 MHz

Programming
- Format: Catholic

Ownership
- Owner: Saint Teresa Catholic Church

History
- First air date: 2006
- Call sign meaning: Aggie Catholic Broadcasting

Technical information
- Licensing authority: FCC
- Facility ID: 133248
- Class: L1
- ERP: 50 watts
- HAAT: 42.3 meters (139 ft)
- Transmitter coordinates: 30°37′54″N 96°21′28″W

Links
- Public license information: LMS
- Website: KACP-LP Online

KACB-LP (96.9 FM) is a radio station licensed to serve College Station, Texas. The station is owned by Saint Teresa Catholic Church. KACB-LP airs a Catholic radio format.

== History ==
This station received its original construction permit from the Federal Communications Commission on December 9, 2004. The new station was assigned the KACB-LP call sign by the FCC on May 23, 2006. KACB-LP received its license to cover from the FCC on July 3, 2006.
