= Williamstown, West Virginia =

City in West Virginia, US

- City
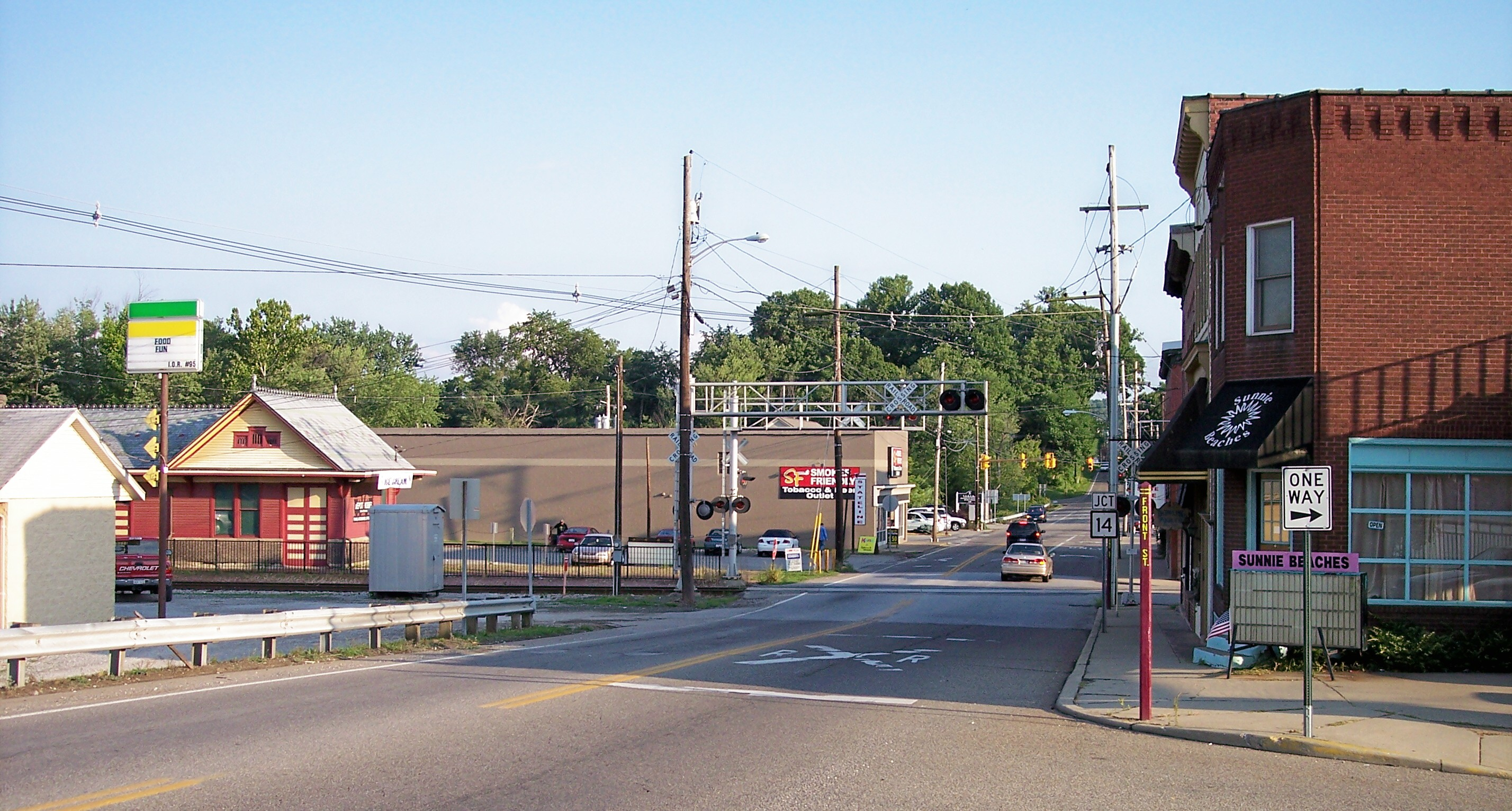
- Highland Avenue in Williamstown in 2007, as viewed from the south end of the Williamstown Bridge

- Location of Williamstown in Wood County, West Virginia.
- Coordinates: 39°23′55″N 81°27′18″W
- Country: United States
- State: West Virginia
- County: Wood
- Chartered: 1822
- Incorporated: 1921

Area
  - Total: 1.81 sq mi (4.69 km^{2})
  - Land: 1.49 sq mi (3.86 km^{2})
  - Water: 0.32 sq mi (0.82 km^{2})
- Elevation: 630 ft (190 m)

Population (2020)
  - Total: 2,997
  - Density: 2,011/sq mi (776.4/km^{2})
- Time zone: UTC-5 (Eastern (EST))
  - Summer (DST): UTC-4 (EDT)
- ZIP code: 26187
- Area code: 304
- FIPS code: 54-87556
- GNIS feature ID: 2390675
- Website: Official website

Williamstown is a city in Wood County, West Virginia, United States, along the Ohio River. It is part of the Parkersburg–Vienna metropolitan area. The population was 2,997 at the 2020 census. The now closed Fenton Art Glass Company was located in the city.

== History ==
Williamstown was named for Isaac Williams (1737–1820), who settled here in 1787. Williams had served under General Braddock (1755) as a ranger and spy and under Governor Dunmore (1774) fighting against the Shawnee. His home was on 400 acres on the Ohio River opposite the mouth of the Muskingum River, site of Marietta, Ohio, which was founded about a year after he arrived. Other local namesakes include Williams Creek and Williams District. The settlement was known as Williamsport to Ohio River travelers until 1822 when the present name was formalized.

Located in Williamstown is the Tomlinson Mansion, listed on the National Register of Historic Places in 1974. Located near Williamstown is the Henderson Hall Historic District.

== Geography ==
According to the United States Census Bureau, the city has a total area of 1.79 square miles (4.64 km^{2}), of which 1.38 square miles (3.57 km^{2}) is land and 0.41 square miles (1.06 km^{2}) is water.

Williamstown is bordered by Marietta, Ohio to the west of the city across the Ohio River and Boaz, WV to the south on WV Route 14. The city is approximately 14 miles north of Parkersburg, WV. Interstate 77 runs through the northeastern tip of the city.

=== Climate ===
The climate in this area is characterized by relatively high temperatures and evenly distributed precipitation throughout the year. According to the Köppen Climate Classification system, Williamstown has a Humid continental climate, abbreviated "Cfa" on climate maps.

Climate data for Williamstown, West Virginia
Month	Jan	Feb	Mar	Apr	May	Jun	Jul	Aug	Sep	Oct	Nov	Dec	Year
Mean daily maximum °F (°C)	37 (3)	39 (4)	43 (6)	53 (12)	65 (18)	74 (23)	82 (28)	85 (29)	77 (25)	66 (19)	54 (12)	43 (6)	64 (18)
Mean daily minimum °F (°C)	23 (−5)	25 (−4)	33 (1)	42 (6)	51 (11)	60 (16)	64 (18)	63 (17)	56 (13)	44 (7)	36 (2)	27 (−3)	44 (7)
Average precipitation inches (mm)	3.2 (81)	2.8 (71)	3.8 (97)	3.4 (86)	4 (100)	3.8 (97)	4.4 (110)	3.8 (97)	3 (76)	2.8 (71)	3.1 (79)	3 (76)	41.1 (1,040)
Source: Weatherbase

== Demographics ==
Historical population
Census	Pop.	Note	%±
1860	209		—
1870	282		34.9%
1880	198		−29.8%
1890	376		89.9%
1910	1,139		—
1920	1,793		57.4%
1930	1,657		−7.6%
1940	1,687		1.8%
1950	2,001		18.6%
1960	2,632		31.5%
1970	2,743		4.2%
1980	3,095		12.8%
1990	2,774		−10.4%
2000	2,996		8.0%
2010	2,908		−2.9%
2020	2,997		3.1%
U.S. Decennial Census

=== 2020 census ===
As of the 2020 census, Williamstown had a population of 2,997. The median age was 45.2 years. 20.8% of residents were under the age of 18 and 22.7% of residents were 65 years of age or older. For every 100 females there were 89.2 males, and for every 100 females age 18 and over there were 86.7 males age 18 and over.

99.6% of residents lived in urban areas, while 0.4% lived in rural areas.

There were 1,314 households in Williamstown, of which 28.6% had children under the age of 18 living in them. Of all households, 49.8% were married-couple households, 15.6% were households with a male householder and no spouse or partner present, and 28.6% were households with a female householder and no spouse or partner present. About 31.2% of all households were made up of individuals and 14.7% had someone living alone who was 65 years of age or older.

There were 1,418 housing units, of which 7.3% were vacant. The homeowner vacancy rate was 1.2% and the rental vacancy rate was 13.0%.

Racial composition as of the 2020 census
Race	Number	Percent
White	2,870	95.8%
Black or African American	12	0.4%
American Indian and Alaska Native	6	0.2%
Asian	10	0.3%
Native Hawaiian and Other Pacific Islander	0	0.0%
Some other race	7	0.2%
Two or more races	92	3.1%
Hispanic or Latino (of any race)	29	1.0%

=== 2010 census ===
As of the census of 2010, there were 2,908 people, 1,254 households, and 848 families living in the city. The population density was 2,107.2 inhabitants per square mile (813.6/km^{2}). There were 1,352 housing units at an average density of 979.7 per square mile (378.3/km^{2}). The racial makeup of the city was 97.7% White, 0.2% African American, 0.5% Native American, 0.3% Asian, 0.1% Pacific Islander, 0.4% from other races, and 0.8% from two or more races. Hispanic or Latino of any race were 0.7% of the population.

There were 1,254 households, of which 30.0% had children under the age of 18 living with them, 53.7% were married couples living together, 9.3% had a female householder with no husband present, 4.6% had a male householder with no wife present, and 32.4% were non-families. 29.6% of all households were made up of individuals, and 14.2% had someone living alone who was 65 years of age or older. The average household size was 2.32 and the average family size was 2.84.

The median age in the city was 44 years. 21.8% of residents were under the age of 18; 6.3% were between the ages of 18 and 24; 23.3% were from 25 to 44; 30.5% were from 45 to 64; and 18.2% were 65 years of age or older. The gender makeup of the city was 46.9% male and 53.1% female.

=== 2000 census ===
As of the census of 2000, there were 2,996 people, 1,251 households, and 876 families living in the city. The population density was 2,233.5 people per square mile (863.3/km^{2}). There were 1,330 housing units at an average density of 991.5 per square mile (383.2/km^{2}). The racial makeup of the city was 98.26% White, 0.20% African American, 0.30% Native American, 0.47% Asian, 0.03% from other races, and 0.73% from two or more races. Hispanic or Latino of any race were 0.67% of the population.

There were 4,123 households, out of which 2.4% had children under the age of 18 living with them, 57.5% were married couples living together, 9.4% had a female householder with no husband present, and 69.9% were non-families. 27.2% of all households were made up of individuals, and 13.0% had someone living alone who was 65 years of age or older. The average household size was 2.39 and the average family size was 2.90.

In the city, the population was spread out, with 23.8% under the age of 18, 6.9% from 18 to 24, 27.5% from 25 to 44, 24.2% from 45 to 64, and 17.6% who were 65 years of age or older. The median age was 40 years. For every 100 females, there were 89.6 males. For every 100 females age 18 and over, there were 87.7 males.

The median income for a household in the city was $54,818, and the median income for a family was $44,189. Males had a median income of $39,475 versus $21,415 for females. The per capita income for the city was $28,219. About 7.0% of families and 8.3% of the population were below the poverty line, including 7.6% of those under age 18 and 2.3% of those age 65 or over.

== Education ==
There were formerly two elementary schools that fed into Williamstown High School, home of the "Yellowjackets": Waverly Elementary, located in Waverly and the old Williamstown elementary. Williamstown-Waverly Elementary, which opened in Williamstown in 2020, is now the only elementary school in the city. The high school has approximately 702 students. Wood County Christian School is also located within the city limits of Williamstown, with students from pre-kindergarten to twelfth grade.

== Culture ==
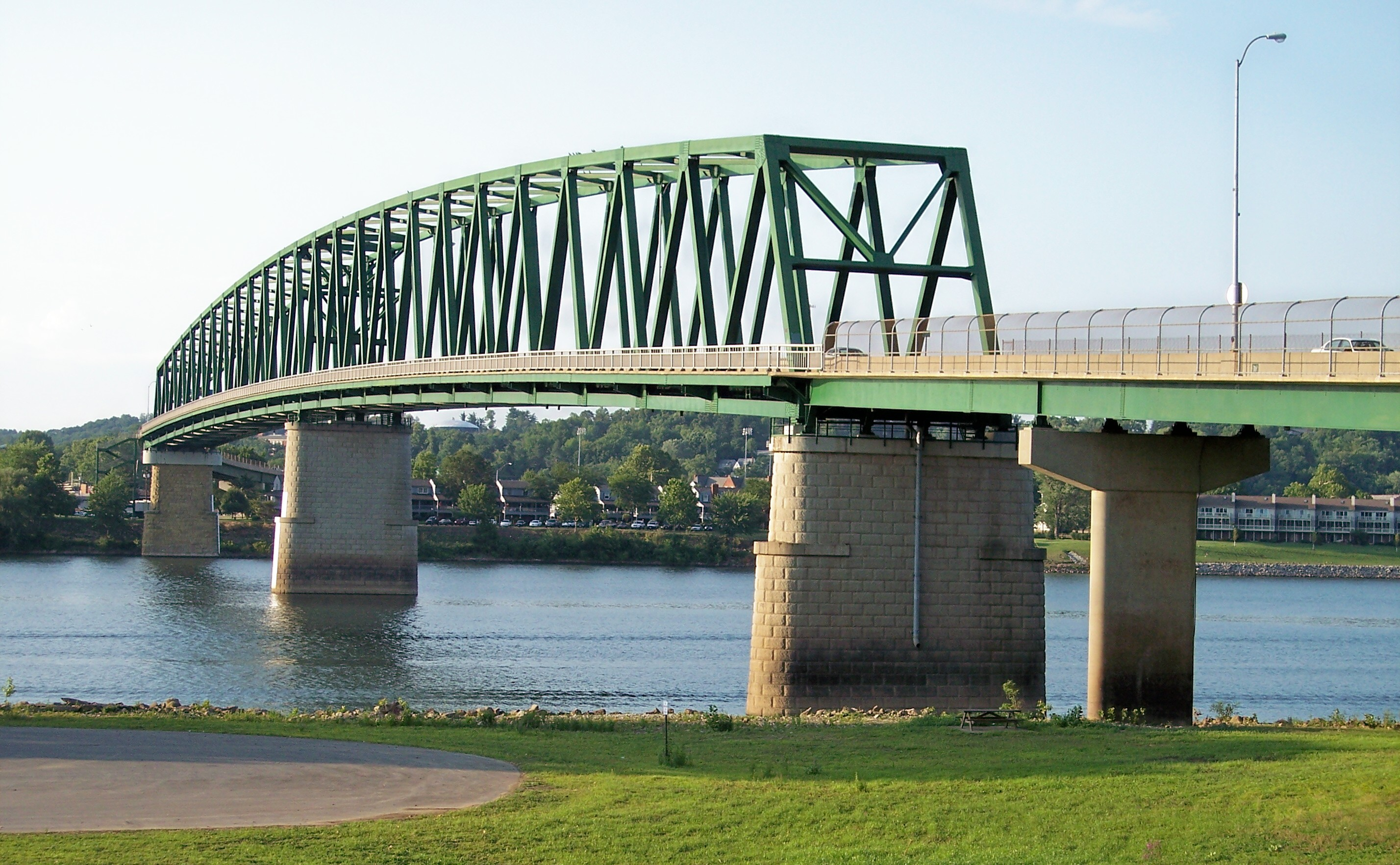
Williamstown Bridge

Since 1976, the Ohio River Sternwheel Festival has been a major event on both sides of the Ohio River, in the towns of Williamstown and Marietta, Ohio. The celebration was created around the races of the sternwheelers (also known as the paddle steamer) that the Mid-Ohio Valley is known for, and today there are pageants, live music, food and a grand fireworks display. The event brings many local community members back to the area around the Labor Day weekend in the month of September.

When the first Fireman's Ice Cream Social was held in 1944, the Williamstown Volunteer Fire Company was already in its 42nd year of service to the community. "The Social" is a homecoming for both current and former residents. Current attendance approaches 3,500 as people of all ages gather in Tomlinson Park, the third Friday evening in July each year, to enjoy hot dogs, popcorn, soft drinks, coffee, pies and cakes that are donated by community members, and more than one hundred gallons of ice cream provided by the volunteer firefighters. The annual event brings the community together and now raises about $8,000 a year for firefighter training and equipment upgrades.

The Saturday following the Ice Cream Social, the Williamstown High School Alumni Association holds an Annual Dinner at the high school, for all WHS alumni. Most WHS class reunions are also held that same July weekend.

== Fenton Glass ==
Founded in 1905 by brothers Frank L. and John W. Fenton, the Fenton Art Glass Company is the largest manufacturer of hand made glass in the United States. The firm is now led by third- and fourth-generation Fenton family members.

After officials of Fenton Art Glass announced the fifth generation family company would shut down the 100-year-old factory at the end of 2007, thousands of loyal Fenton customers reacted with an outpouring of orders, selling out the QVC show that was to be its last in just minutes instead of the scheduled 2-hour show. Fenton is now open and working to stay open; tours are run daily through the gift shop and orders are placed online, on QVC and via its decades-old catalog. Fenton Art Glass Company has officially stopped making glass.

As of May 24, 2012 completion the sale of selected assets as scheduled. This included the sale of the name and logo, the formulas for the glass, molds and other materials that were used by the company. However, today the company now makes handcrafted glass jewelry; including beads and Teardrop earrings. The jewelry is made in many of the classic Fenton colors and styles popular with collectors.

On June 2, 2017, the Wood County Board of Education purchased the factory and surrounding properties to build a new elementary school.
