= WMKI-LP =

Radio station in Terre Haute, Indiana

- Terre Haute, Indiana; United States
- Broadcast area: Metro Terre Haute
- Frequency: 96.9 MHz

Programming
- Format: Silent

Ownership
- Owner: Wabash Valley Educational Media

History
- First air date: August 14, 2014
- Former call signs: WEVX-LP (2014, CP only); WXXR-LP (2014–2017); WEVX-LP (2017–2018); WUZA-LP (2018–2020)
- Former frequencies: 97.3 MHz (2014–2018)

Technical information
- Licensing authority: FCC
- Facility ID: 193107
- Class: L1
- Power: 100 watts
- HAAT: 28.1 meters (92 ft)
- Transmitter coordinates: 39.468°N 87.388°W

Links
- Public license information: LMS
- Website: WMKI-LP Online

WMKI-LP is a broadcast radio station licensed to and serving Terre Haute, Indiana. WMKI-LP is owned and operated by Wabash Valley Educational Media.
