= National Register of Historic Places listings in Columbus, Ohio =

Map

This is a list of the National Register of Historic Places entries in Columbus, Ohio, United States. The National Register is a federal register for buildings, structures, and sites of historic significance. This is intended to be a complete list of the properties and districts in Columbus.

There are 362 properties and districts listed on the National Register in Franklin County, including 3 National Historic Landmarks. The city of Columbus is the location of 185 of these properties and districts, including all of the National Historic Landmarks; they are listed here, while the remaining properties and districts are listed separately. Another 3 properties were once listed but have been removed. Of the sites on the National Register in Columbus, 54 are also on the Columbus Register of Historic Properties, the city's list of local landmarks.

This National Park Service list is complete through NPS recent listings posted October 23, 2026.

== Current listings ==
^{#}	Individual entry
^{†}	Historic district
^{‡}	National Historic Landmark
^{*}	Delisted entry

- Numbers represent an ordering by significant words. Different colors, defined above, differentiate individual listings from districts, National Historic Landmarks, and delisted sites.

	Name on the Register	Image	Date listed	Location	CRHP-listed	Description
1^{#}	American Insurance Union Citadel	American Insurance Union Citadel	March 21, 1975 (#75001398)	50 W. Broad St. 39°57′45″N 83°00′08″W	Yes	Now known as the LeVeque Tower and Palace Theatre
2^{#}	Athletic Club of Columbus	Athletic Club of Columbus	September 29, 2011 (#11000711)	136 E. Broad St. 39°57′47″N 82°59′49″W	No	
3^{#}	Beatty-Moore House	Beatty-Moore House	February 17, 2023 (#100008631)	41 North Monroe Ave. 39°57′57″N 82°58′43″W	No	
4^{#}	Bellows Avenue School		January 11, 2024 (#100009450)	725 Bellows Ave. 39°57′10″N 83°01′06″W	No	
5^{#}	Berry Brothers Bolt Works	Berry Brothers Bolt Works	February 19, 1988 (#88000051)	350 E. 1st Ave. 39°58′52″N 82°59′41″W	No	
6^{#}	Richard Berry Jr. House	Richard Berry Jr. House	July 27, 2005 (#05000754)	324 E. North Broadway; 40°01′55″N 83°00′24″W	Yes	
7^{#}	Born Capital Brewery Bottling Works	Born Capital Brewery Bottling Works	June 18, 2009 (#09000442)	570 S. Front St. 39°57′01″N 82°59′59″W	No	
8^{#}	Bradford Shoe Company Building	Bradford Shoe Company Building	July 22, 1994 (#94000772)	232 Neilston St. 39°58′05″N 82°59′39″W	No	
9^{#}	Broad Street Apartments	Broad Street Apartments	December 16, 1986 (#86003404)	880-886 E. Broad St. 39°58′N 82°59′W	Yes	
10^{#}	Broad Street Christian Church	Broad Street Christian Church	December 16, 1986 (#86003448)	1051 E. Broad St. 39°57′54″N 82°58′23″W	Yes	
11^{#}	Broad Street United Methodist Church	Broad Street United Methodist Church	November 26, 1980 (#80002997)	501 E. Broad St. 39°57′48″N 82°59′15″W	Yes	
12^{#}	Buckeye State Building and Loan Company Building	Buckeye State Building and Loan Company Building	October 13, 2004 (#04001145)	36-42 E. Gay St. 39°57′51″N 82°59′59″W	No	
13^{#}	Budd Dairy Company	Budd Dairy Company	February 14, 2017 (#100000664)	1086 N. 4th St. 39°59′07″N 82°59′56″W	No	
14^{#}	Cambridge Arms	Cambridge Arms	December 18, 2003 (#86003412)	926 E. Broad St. 39°57′55″N 82°58′34″W	Yes	
15^{#}	Camp Chase Site	Camp Chase Site	April 11, 1973 (#73001434)	2900 Sullivant Ave. 39°56′38″N 83°04′33″W	No	
16^{#}	Shrum Mound	Shrum Mound	November 10, 1970 (#70000490)	McKinley Ave. 39°59′24″N 83°04′51″W	No	
17^{#}	Central Assurance Company	Central Assurance Company	December 19, 1986 (#86003421)	741 E. Broad St. 39°57′51″N 82°58′52″W	No	
18^{#}	Central Building of the Columbus Young Men's Christian Association	Central Building of the Columbus Young Men's Christian Association	May 6, 1993 (#93000402)	40 W. Long St. 39°57′54″N 83°00′09″W	No	
19^{#}	Central High School	Central High School	March 7, 1985 (#85000484)	75 S. Washington Boulevard; 39°57′35″N 83°00′23″W	Yes	Now houses the COSI museum
20^{#}	Central Ohio Lunatic Asylum	Central Ohio Lunatic Asylum	April 24, 1986 (#86000851)	1960 W. Broad St. 39°57′30″N 83°03′20″W	No	Demolished
21^{#}	Coe Mound		July 18, 1974 (#74001486)	West of High Street	No	Site and its coordinates are restricted
22^{#}	Truman and Sylvia Bull Coe House	Truman and Sylvia Bull Coe House	May 10, 2006 (#06000361)	75 E. Lakeview Ave. 40°01′38″N 83°00′44″W	No	
23^{#}	Columbia Building	Columbia Building	August 12, 1983 (#83001967)	161-167 N. High St. 39°57′57″N 83°00′06″W	Yes	
24^{#}	Columbus Center	Columbus Center	March 10, 2023 (#100008685)	100 East Broad St. 39°57′47″N 82°59′51″W	No	Now known as Chase Tower
25^{#}	Columbus Carriage Manufacturing Co. - Seagrave Co. Buildings		March 18, 2024 (#100010052)	2000-2050 S. High St. 39°55′12″N 82°59′43″W	No	
26^{#}	Columbus Country Club Mound	Columbus Country Club Mound	February 15, 1974 (#74001487)	4831 E. Broad St. 39°58′09″N 82°51′41″W	No	
27^{#}	Columbus Gallery of Fine Arts	Columbus Gallery of Fine Arts	March 19, 1992 (#92000173)	480 E. Broad St. 39°57′51″N 82°59′16″W	No	
28^{†}	Columbus Near East Side District	Columbus Near East Side District	May 19, 1978 (#78002063), #83004287 increase	Roughly bounded by Parsons Ave., Broad and Main Sts., and the railroad tracks; also 43-125 Parsons Ave., including 684 Oak St. and 690 Franklin Ave. 39°57′43″N 82°57′53″W	Portions	
29^{#}	Columbus Savings and Trust Building	Columbus Savings and Trust Building	September 15, 1977 (#77001060)	8 E. Long St. 39°57′55″N 83°00′03″W	No	Now known as the Atlas Building
30^{#}	Columbus Transfer Company Warehouse	Columbus Transfer Company Warehouse	February 24, 1983 (#83001966)	55 Nationwide Boulevard; 39°58′08″N 83°00′00″W	No	
31^{#}	Anson Davis House	Anson Davis House	July 7, 1975 (#75001402)	4900 Hayden Run Rd. 40°03′57″N 83°07′23″W	No	
32^{#}	Anson Davis Springhouse	Anson Davis Springhouse	April 11, 1979 (#79002907)	4900 Hayden Run Rd. 40°03′58″N 83°07′23″W	No	
33^{#}	Del Monte Apartments	Del Monte Apartments	December 13, 2016 (#16000846)	341-345 S. 3rd St. 39°57′19″N 82°59′49″W	No	
34^{#}	Elam Drake House	Elam Drake House	April 6, 1978 (#78002064)	2738 Ole Country Lane; 40°00′15″N 82°55′15″W	No	Demolished
35^{#}	East Broad Street Commercial Building	East Broad Street Commercial Building	December 16, 1986 (#86003424)	747, 749, and 751 E. Broad St. 39°57′51″N 82°58′51″W	No	
36^{†}	East Broad Street Historic District	East Broad Street Historic District	March 17, 1987 (#86003393)	Along E. Broad St. between Monypenny and Ohio Aves. 39°58′01″N 82°57′39″W	No	
37^{#}	East Broad Street Presbyterian Church	East Broad Street Presbyterian Church	March 17, 1987 (#86003397)	760 E. Broad St. 39°57′53″N 82°58′49″W	No	
38^{†}	East North Broadway Historic District	East North Broadway Historic District	July 8, 2010 (#10000454)	E. North Broadway roughly between Broadway Place and N. Broadway Lane; 40°01′53″N 83°00′25″W	No	
39^{†}	East Town Street Historic District	East Town Street Historic District	July 30, 1976 (#76001425)	Roughly bounded by Grant and Franklin Aves., Lester Dr., and E. Rich St. 39°57′34″N 82°59′16″W	Yes	
40^{#}	Eastgate Apartments Historic District	Eastgate Apartments Historic District	November 3, 2023 (#100009503)	455-461 (odd) N Nelson Rd., 492-508 (even) Sunbury Rd., 1864-2112 (even) Maryland Ave; 39°58′39″N 82°56′46″W	No	
41^{#}	The Edna	The Edna	February 21, 2017 (#100000665)	877-881 E. Long St. 39°58′03″N 82°58′40″W	No	
42^{#}	Engine House No. 6	Engine House No. 6	September 2, 2016 (#16000595)	540 W. Broad St. 39°57′39″N 83°00′54″W	No	
43^{#}	Engine House No. 16	Engine House No. 16	May 11, 1995 (#95000580)	260 N. 4th St. 39°58′06″N 82°59′49″W	Yes	
44^{#}	Felton School	Felton School	May 31, 1984 (#84003677)	Leonard Ave. at N. Monroe St. 39°58′32″N 82°58′42″W	Yes	Demolished
45^{†}	Fifth Avenue and North High Historic District	Fifth Avenue and North High Historic District	April 19, 1990 (#90000584)	N. High St. roughly between 4th Ave. and Clark Pl. 39°59′13″N 83°00′18″W	No	
46^{#}	First Congregational Church	First Congregational Church	November 29, 2021 (#100007182)	444 East Broad St. 39°57′49″N 82°59′20″W	Yes	
47^{#}	Ford Motor Company Columbus Branch Assembly Plant	Ford Motor Company Columbus Branch Assembly Plant	March 15, 2021 (#100006229)	427 Cleveland Ave. 39°58′21″N 82°59′25″W	Yes	
48^{†}	Fort Hayes	Fort Hayes	January 26, 1970 (#70000491)	Columbus Ave. and Interstate 71; 39°58′26″N 82°59′18″W	No	
49^{#}	Franklin Park Conservatory	Franklin Park Conservatory	January 18, 1974 (#74001489)	1547 E. Broad St. 39°57′57″N 82°57′11″W	No	
50^{#}	Franklin Park Medical Center	Franklin Park Medical Center	November 4, 2016 (#16000754)	1829 E. Long St. 39°58′07″N 82°57′08″W	No	
51^{#}	Franklinton Apartments at Broad and Hawkes	Franklinton Apartments at Broad and Hawkes	April 22, 2005 (#05000028)	949-957 W. Broad St., 13-23 Hawkes Ave. 39°57′32″N 83°01′34″W	No	
52^{#}	Franklinton Apartments at State and May	Franklinton Apartments at State and May	April 22, 2005 (#05000027)	494-504 State St., 74-82 S. May Ave. 39°57′32″N 83°00′50″W	No	
53^{#}	Franklinton Post Office	Franklinton Post Office	March 20, 1973 (#73001435)	72 S. Gift St. 39°57′32″N 83°00′55″W	Yes	
54^{#}	Gaetz Music House	Gaetz Music House	December 3, 2014 (#14000995)	49-53 W. Long St. 39°57′53″N 83°00′10″W	No	
55^{#}	Garfield-Broad Apartments	Garfield-Broad Apartments	December 16, 1986 (#86003427)	775 E. Broad St. 39°57′52″N 82°58′48″W	No	
56^{†}	German Village	German Village	December 30, 1974 (#74001490)	Roughly bounded by Livingston Ave., Pear Alley, Nursery Lane, Blackberry Alley, and Lathrop St.; also Briggs between E. Beck and Sycamore, S. 9th between E. Blenkner and Sycamore; 39°56′45″N 82°59′34″W	No	Overlaps with city historic district
57^{†}	Glen Echo Historic District	Glen Echo Historic District	October 24, 1997 (#97001241)	Roughly bounded by Glen Echo Ravine, the former Big Four railroad tracks, Indianola Ave., and Hudson St. 40°01′01″N 82°59′59″W	No	
58^{#}	H.C. Godman Co. Building	H.C. Godman Co. Building	June 14, 2018 (#100002552)	35 N. 4th St. 39°57′49″N 82°59′48″W	No	
59^{#}	A.B. Graham House	A.B. Graham House	June 5, 2015 (#15000323)	159 Clinton Heights Ave. 40°01′48″N 83°00′39″W	No	
60^{#}	Great Southern Hotel and Theatre	Great Southern Hotel and Theatre	December 2, 1982 (#82001458)	S. High and E. Main Sts. 39°57′21″N 82°59′57″W	Yes	
61^{#}	Green Lawn Cemetery	Green Lawn Cemetery	June 21, 2024 (#100010446)	1000 Greenlawn Ave. 39°56′24″N 83°01′28″W	Yes	
62^{#}	Griswold Memorial Young Women's Christian Association	Griswold Memorial Young Women's Christian Association	July 22, 1993 (#93000671)	65 S. 4th St. 39°57′40″N 82°59′47″W	No	
63^{#}	Gilbert H. Hamilton House	Gilbert H. Hamilton House	December 16, 1992 (#89000175)	290 Cliffside Dr. 40°01′08″N 83°00′16″W	Yes	
64^{†}	Hamilton Park Historic District	Hamilton Park Historic District	July 28, 1983 (#83001968)	Broad and Long Sts. 39°57′57″N 82°58′53″W	Yes	
65^{#}	The Hamlet	The Hamlet	February 23, 2015 (#15000040)	138-166 E. 5th and 1193-1195 Hamlet Sts. 39°59′15″N 83°00′03″W	Yes	
66^{†}	Hanford Village George Washington Carver Addition Historic District	Hanford Village George Washington Carver Addition Historic District	December 24, 2013 (#13000980)	1918-1939 and 2012-2030 Kent and 783-879 Lyman Sts., 822-1958 Clay Ct., 851-853 Bowman Ave., and Hanford Park; 39°57′02″N 82°56′46″W	No	
67^{#}	Hanna House	Hanna House	April 19, 1979 (#79001835)	1021 E. Broad St. 39°57′54″N 82°58′24″W	Yes	
68^{#}	Gen. William Henry Harrison Headquarters	Gen. William Henry Harrison Headquarters	December 15, 1972 (#72001010)	570 W. Broad St. 39°57′38″N 83°00′57″W	Yes	
69^{#}	Hartley Mound	Hartley Mound	July 15, 1974 (#74001491)	Between Gibbstone Dr. and Edelmarr Ln., east of Wilson Rd. 39°58′55″N 83°06′08″W	No	
70^{#}	Hartman Hotel	Hartman Hotel	September 4, 2018 (#100002877)	275 S. 4th and 150 E. Main Sts. 39°57′25″N 82°59′43″W	No	
71^{#}	Hayden Building	Hayden Building	June 11, 2009 (#09000412)	20 E. Broad St. 39°57′45″N 83°00′00″W	No	
72^{#}	Heyne-Zimmerman House	Heyne-Zimmerman House	March 17, 1987 (#86003450)	973 E. Broad St. 39°57′54″N 82°58′29″W	Yes	
73^{#}	H.A. Higgins Building	H.A. Higgins Building	August 27, 1979 (#79001836)	129 E. Naghten St; 39°58′07″N 82°59′53″W	Yes	Also known as the Flatiron Building
74^{†}	High and Gay Streets Historic District	High and Gay Streets Historic District	March 4, 2014 (#14000041)	Bounded by Gay, Wall, and High Sts., and Pearl, Lynn, and Elm Alleys; 39°57′48″N 83°00′03″W	No	
75^{#}	Holy Cross Church, Rectory and School	Holy Cross Church, Rectory and School	April 26, 1979 (#79001837)	212 S. 5th St. 39°57′29″N 82°59′35″W	No	
76^{#}	Holy Rosary Roman Catholic Church Complex	Holy Rosary Roman Catholic Church Complex	July 5, 2024 (#100010473)	1651, 1667 East Main Street, 498 Berkeley Road, and 1640 East Mound Street; 39°57′27″N 82°57′22″W	No	
77^{#}	L. Hoster Brewing Company	L. Hoster Brewing Company	June 17, 2019 (#100004060)	477 S. Front St. 39°57′08″N 83°00′01″W	No	
78^{#}	House at 753 East Broad Street	House at 753 East Broad Street	December 17, 1986 (#86003425)	753 E. Broad St. 39°57′51″N 82°58′50″W	No	
79^{#}	Indianola Junior High School	Indianola Junior High School	June 30, 1980 (#80003000)	420 E. 19th Ave. 40°00′14″N 82°59′50″W	Yes	
80^{†}	Iuka Ravine Historic District	Iuka Ravine Historic District	May 8, 1986 (#86001023)	Roughly bounded by E. Lane and E. Northwood., N. 4th, 20th and E. 19th, and Indianola Aves. 40°00′18″N 83°00′06″W	Yes	
81^{#}	Felix A. Jacobs House	Felix A. Jacobs House	December 19, 1986 (#86003434)	1421 Hamlet St. 39°59′40″N 83°00′02″W	No	
82^{#}	Jaeger Machine Company Office Building	Jaeger Machine Company Office Building	June 16, 1983 (#83001969)	550 W. Spring St. 39°57′59″N 83°00′59″W	No	
83^{†}	Jefferson Avenue Historic District	Jefferson Avenue Historic District	December 2, 1982 (#82001459)	Roughly bounded by Interstate 71, E. Broad, 11th, and Long Sts. 39°57′56″N 82°59′06″W	Yes	
84^{#}	Jeffrey Manufacturing Company Office Building	Jeffrey Manufacturing Company Office Building	April 12, 2001 (#01000379)	224 E. 1st Ave., 883 and 895 N. 6th St. 39°58′51″N 82°59′52″W	Yes	
85^{#}	Johnson-Campbell House	Johnson-Campbell House	December 17, 1986 (#86003414)	1203 E. Broad St. 39°57′56″N 82°58′07″W	No	
86^{#}	W.H. Jones Mansion	W.H. Jones Mansion	October 2, 1978 (#78002065)	731 E. Broad St. 39°57′51″N 82°58′51″W	Yes	
87^{#}	Joseph-Cherrington House	Joseph-Cherrington House	December 17, 1986 (#86003429)	785 E. Broad St. 39°57′52″N 82°58′47″W	No	
88^{#}	Julian and Kokenge Company	Julian and Kokenge Company	December 12, 2013 (#13000936)	280 S. Front St. 39°57′22″N 83°00′03″W	No	
89^{#}	The Kahiki	The Kahiki	December 8, 1997 (#97001461)	3583 E. Broad St. 39°58′21″N 82°54′17″W	No	Demolished
90^{#}	Linus B. Kauffman House	Linus B. Kauffman House	December 17, 1986 (#86003410)	906 E. Broad St. 39°57′55″N 82°58′36″W	Yes	
91^{#}	Frank J. Kaufman House	Frank J. Kaufman House	December 17, 1986 (#86003420)	1231 E. Broad St. 39°57′57″N 82°58′05″W	No	
92^{#}	Knights of Columbus Building	Knights of Columbus Building	August 24, 2020 (#100005448)	80 S. 6th St., 306 E. State St. 39°57′41″N 82°59′31″W	No	
93^{#}	Krumm House	Krumm House	September 30, 1982 (#82003568)	975-979 S. High St. 39°56′32″N 82°59′50″W	Yes	
94^{#}	Samuel Landes House	Samuel Landes House	May 8, 1987 (#87000688)	590 Hibbs Rd. 39°50′23″N 83°01′07″W	No	
95^{#}	Soloman Levy House	Soloman Levy House	December 17, 1986 (#86003437)	929 E. Broad St. 39°57′53″N 82°58′33″W	Yes	
96^{#}	Lincoln Theatre	Lincoln Theatre	October 8, 1992 (#92001355)	77 E. Long St. 39°58′01″N 82°58′52″W	No	
97^{#}	Long and Third Commercial Building	Long and Third Commercial Building	July 1, 1982 (#82003569)	104-114 E. Long St. 39°57′56″N 82°59′54″W	No	Demolished, site pictured
98^{#}	Carrie Lovejoy House	Carrie Lovejoy House	December 17, 1986 (#86003435)	807 E. Broad St. 39°57′51″N 82°58′45″W	No	
99^{#}	The Lubal Manufacturing and Distributing Company	The Lubal Manufacturing and Distributing Company	July 19, 2016 (#16000459)	373-375 W. Rich St. 39°57′22″N 83°00′35″W	Yes	
100^{#}	Market-Mohawk Center	Market-Mohawk Center	August 24, 2020 (#100005454)	250 E. Town St. 39°57′36″N 82°59′35″W	Yes	
101^{†}	Market-Mohawk Historic District	Market-Mohawk Historic District	December 18, 2025 (#100012406)	101-323 E. Town St., 201 S. Grant Ave., 200-301 E. Rich St., 199-380 S. Fifth St., 215-380 E. Main St., 150 E. Mound St., 365 S. Fourth St. 39°57′36″N 82°59′35″W	Yes	
102^{#}	Masonic Temple	Masonic Temple	February 27, 1997 (#97000201)	34 N. 4th St. 39°57′50″N 82°59′46″W	No	
103^{#}	McClure-Nesbitt Motor Company	McClure-Nesbitt Motor Company	September 23, 2024 (#100010844)	1505 East Main Street; 39°57′27″N 82°57′32″W	No	
104^{#}	McDannald Homestead	McDannald Homestead	February 17, 1978 (#78002066)	5847 Sunbury Rd. 40°04′41″N 82°53′49″W	No	Demolished
105^{#}	Frederick A. Miller House-Broad Gables	Frederick A. Miller House-Broad Gables	August 8, 1985 (#85001689)	2065 Barton Pl. and 140 Park Dr. 39°57′55″N 82°56′41″W	No	
106^{#}	C.E. Morris House	C.E. Morris House	December 17, 1986 (#86003398)	875 E. Broad St. 39°57′53″N 82°58′38″W	Yes	
107^{†}	Mt. Vernon Avenue Historic District	Mt. Vernon Avenue Historic District	July 3, 2025 (#100011985)	Roughly bounded by Mt. Vernon, Monroe, Atcheson, and 22nd streets 39°58′24″N 82°58′24″W	Yes	
108^{#}	Municipal Light Plant	Municipal Light Plant	December 15, 2015 (#15000902)	555 W. Nationwide Boulevard; 39°58′01″N 83°01′07″W	No	
109^{†}	Near Northside Historic District	Near Northside Historic District	June 4, 1980 (#80003001)	Off State Route 315; 39°59′05″N 83°00′45″W	No	Overlaps with city historic district.
110^{#}	New Hayden Building	New Hayden Building	June 11, 2009 (#09000413)	16 E. Broad St. 39°57′45″N 83°00′01″W	No	
111^{†}	New Indianola Historic District	New Indianola Historic District	April 30, 1985 (#85000947)	Roughly bounded by Chittenden and Grant Aves., 5th St., 7th Ave., and 4th St. 39°59′42″N 82°59′52″W	Yes	
112^{#}	Jonathan Noble House	Jonathan Noble House	December 3, 1975 (#75001400)	5030 Westerville Rd. (State Route 3); 40°04′29″N 82°55′42″W	No	
113^{†}	North Columbus Commercial Historic District	North Columbus Commercial Historic District	October 14, 2010 (#10000828)	Roughly centered on N. High St. between Hudson and Dodridge; 40°00′56″N 83°00′42″W	No	
114^{#}	North High School	North High School	July 2, 1987 (#87000984)	100 Arcadia Ave. 40°01′05″N 83°00′31″W	Yes	
115^{†}	North Market Historic District	North Market Historic District	December 30, 1982 (#82001460)	Roughly bounded by W. Goodale, Park, High, Front and Vine Sts. 39°58′18″N 83°00′13″W	Yes	
116^{#}	Ohio Asylum for the Blind	Ohio Asylum for the Blind	July 26, 1973 (#73001436)	240 Parsons Ave. 39°57′33″N 82°58′52″W	No	Now the Columbus Public Health building
117^{#}	Ohio Baptist General Association Headquarters	Ohio Baptist General Association Headquarters	December 3, 2020 (#100005845)	48 Parkwood Ave. 39°58′05″N 82°57′35″W	Yes	
118^{#}	Ohio Bell Southwestern Headquarters	Ohio Bell Southwestern Headquarters	December 20, 2021 (#100007231)	150 E. Gay St. 39°57′52″N 82°59′49″W	No	
119^{#}	Ohio Farm Bureau Federation Offices	Ohio Farm Bureau Federation Offices	March 13, 1987 (#87000466)	620 and 630 E. Broad St. 39°57′52″N 82°59′02″W	No	
120^{#}	Ohio Finance Building	Ohio Finance Building	December 2, 2014 (#14000994)	39-47 W. Long St. 39°57′52″N 83°00′09″W	No	
121^{#}	Ohio Historical Center and Ohio Village	Ohio Historical Center and Ohio Village	May 5, 2023 (#100008897)	800 E. 17th Avenue; 40°00′22″N 82°59′13″W	No	
122^{#}	Ohio Institution for the Education of the Deaf and Dumb	Ohio Institution for the Education of the Deaf and Dumb	October 25, 1984 (#84000107)	408 E. Town St. 39°57′39″N 82°59′20″W	Yes	Now the Cristo Rey Columbus High School
123^{#}	Ohio Moline Plow Company Building	Ohio Moline Plow Company Building	June 10, 1999 (#99000701)	343 Front St. 39°58′10″N 83°00′15″W	Yes	
124^{#}	Ohio National Bank	Ohio National Bank	November 26, 1980 (#80003002)	167 S. High St. 39°57′31″N 83°00′02″W	No	
125^{#}	Ohio Stadium	Ohio Stadium	March 22, 1974 (#74001494)	404 W. 17th Ave. 40°00′06″N 83°01′11″W	No	
126^{#}	Ohio State Arsenal	Ohio State Arsenal	July 18, 1974 (#74001495)	139 W. Main St. 39°57′19″N 83°00′12″W	Yes	
127^{#}	Ohio State Office Building	Ohio State Office Building	December 18, 1990 (#90001908), #100007452 increase	65 S. Front St. 39°57′37″N 83°00′09″W	No	Now known as the Thomas J. Moyer Ohio Judicial Center
128^{‡}	Ohio Statehouse	Ohio Statehouse	July 31, 1972 (#72001011)	Southeastern corner of High and Broad Sts. 39°57′41″N 82°59′56″W	Yes	
129^{‡}	Ohio Theatre	Ohio Theatre	April 11, 1973 (#73001437)	39 E. State St. 39°57′36″N 82°59′56″W	No	
130<^{†}	Old Beechwold Historic District	Old Beechwold Historic District	September 22, 1987 (#87001146)	Roughly bounded by W. Jeffrey Pl., N. High, River Park Dr., and Olentangy Boulevard; 40°03′37″N 83°01′24″W	Yes	
131^{#}	Old Governor's Mansion	Old Governor's Mansion	June 5, 1972 (#72001012)	1234 E. Broad St. 39°57′59″N 82°58′06″W	No	
132^{†}	Old North End Historic District	Old North End Historic District	August 30, 1996 (#96000964)	Roughly bounded by Interstate 670, Pearl St., E. 2nd Ave., and N. 4th St.; also roughly bounded by W. 1st and E. 2nd Ave., N. Pearl St., E. 5th Ave., Summit St., and Beacon Alley; 39°58′44″N 83°00′03″W	No	Overlaps with city historic district
133^{#}	Old Ohio Union	Old Ohio Union	April 20, 1979 (#79001838)	154 W. 12th Ave. 39°59′49″N 83°00′42″W	No	Now Hale Hall at OSU
134^{#}	Old Port Columbus Airport Control Tower	Old Port Columbus Airport Control Tower	July 26, 1979 (#79001839)	4920 E. 5th Ave. 39°59′13″N 82°52′19″W	Yes	To become the Ohio Air & Space Hall of Fame and Museum
135^{#}	Open Air School	Open Air School	June 14, 2019 (#100004054)	2571 Neil Ave. 40°00′52″N 83°00′51″W	No	
136^{#}	Orton Memorial Laboratory	Orton Memorial Laboratory	November 25, 1983 (#83004292)	1445 Summit St. 39°59′32″N 83°00′07″W	Yes	
137^{#}	Elijah Pierce Properties	Elijah Pierce Properties	August 3, 1983 (#83001971)	534 E. Long St. and 142-44 N. Everett Alley; 39°58′00″N 82°59′12″W	No	Demolished, site pictured
138^{#}	Plaza Hotel	Plaza Hotel	December 20, 1984 (#84001041)	736-740 E. Long St. 39°58′02″N 82°58′54″W	No	Demolished, site pictured
139^{#}	Frederick Prentiss House	Frederick Prentiss House	December 17, 1986 (#86003396)	706 E. Broad St. 39°57′53″N 82°58′55″W	No	Demolished, site pictured
140^{#}	Prentiss-Tulford House	Prentiss-Tulford House	December 17, 1986 (#86003413)	1074 E. Broad St. 39°57′58″N 82°58′19″W	No	Demolished, site pictured
141^{#}	Pythian Temple and James Pythian Theater	Pythian Temple and James Pythian Theater	November 25, 1983 (#83004295)	861-867 Mt. Vernon Ave. 39°58′16″N 82°58′44″W	Yes	Also known as the King Arts Complex
142^{#}	Railroad Employes Building & Loan Company	Railroad Employes Building & Loan Company	March 12, 2026 (#100012803)	60 East Broad Street; 39°57′45″N 82°59′56″W	No	
142^{#}	Rankin Building	Rankin Building	March 10, 1982 (#82003570)	22 W. Gay St. 39°57′49″N 83°00′05″W	No	
143^{‡}	Capt. Edward V. Rickenbacker House	Capt. Edward V. Rickenbacker House	May 11, 1976 (#76001426)	1334 E. Livingston Ave. 39°56′58″N 82°57′44″W	Yes	
144^{#}	St. Clair Hospital	St. Clair Hospital	April 12, 2001 (#01000378)	338-344 and 346 St. Clair Ave. 39°58′18″N 82°58′50″W	No	
145^{#}	Saint Paul's Episcopal Church	Saint Paul's Episcopal Church	December 17, 1986 (#86003430)	787 E. Broad St. 39°57′51″N 82°58′46″W	No	
146^{†}	Schlee Brewery Historic District	Schlee Brewery Historic District	March 28, 1988 (#88000208)	526, 543, 560, and rear 526 S. Front St., and the northeastern corner of Beck St. and Wall Alley; 39°57′02″N 82°59′55″W	No	Overlaps with city historic district
147^{#}	Schlee-Kemmler Building	Schlee-Kemmler Building	December 2, 1982 (#82001461)	328 S. High St. 39°57′19″N 82°59′57″W	Yes	
148^{#}	Erwin W. Schueller House	Erwin W. Schueller House	December 17, 1986 (#86003406)	904 E. Broad St. 39°57′55″N 82°58′37″W	Yes	
149^{#}	Scofield-Sanor House	Scofield-Sanor House	December 17, 1986 (#86003447)	1031 E. Broad St. 39°57′54″N 82°58′23″W	Yes	
150^{#}	Second Presbyterian Church	Second Presbyterian Church	January 11, 1983 (#83001972)	132 S. 3rd St. 39°57′35″N 82°59′49″W	Yes	Now known as the Central Presbyterian Church
151^{#}	Seneca Hotel	Seneca Hotel	December 29, 1983 (#83004300)	361 E. Broad St. 39°57′46″N 82°59′27″W	Yes	
152^{#}	Sharp-Page House	Sharp-Page House	December 17, 1986 (#86003440)	935 E. Broad St. 39°57′53″N 82°58′32″W	Yes	
153^{#}	Shedd-Dunn House	Shedd-Dunn House	December 17, 1986 (#86003445)	965 E. Broad St. 39°57′54″N 82°58′30″W	Yes	
154^{#}	Shiloh Baptist Church	Shiloh Baptist Church	December 4, 2004 (#04001288)	720 Mt. Vernon Ave. 39°58′15″N 82°58′58″W	No	
155^{†}	Short North Historic District	Short North Historic District	April 19, 1990 (#90000583)	N. High St. roughly between Poplar St. and Cedar Ave. 39°58′34″N 83°00′12″W	No	
156^{#}	Benjamin Smith House	Benjamin Smith House	June 4, 1973 (#73001438)	181 E. Broad St. 39°57′45″N 82°59′45″W	No	
157^{#}	South High School	South High School	September 1, 2015 (#15000561)	345 E. Deshler Ave. 39°56′25″N 82°59′13″W	Yes	
158^{†}	South High Street Commercial Grouping	South High Street Commercial Grouping	December 29, 1983 (#83004301)	Bounded by Pearl, Mound, Main, and High Sts. 39°57′20″N 82°59′56″W	Yes	
159^{#}	The Standard Building	The Standard Building	October 28, 2019 (#100004597)	174 E. Long St. 39°57′56″N 82°59′48″W	Yes	
160^{#}	Stoddart Block	Stoddart Block	March 17, 1994 (#94000237)	260 S. 4th St. 39°57′27″N 82°59′42″W	No	
161^{#}	Lucas Sullivant Building	Lucas Sullivant Building	March 20, 1973 (#73001439)	714 W. Gay St. 39°57′39″N 83°00′58″W	Yes	
162^{†}	Teakwood Heights Historic District	Teakwood Heights Historic District	November 15, 2024 (#100011016)	Inclusive addresses along Gardendale Drive, North Gardendale Drive, West Gardendale Drive, Somersworth Court, Somersworth Drive, North Somersworth Drive, and 1325 Sunbury Road; 39°59′47″N 82°56′30″W	No	
163^{#}	Theresa Building	Theresa Building	June 8, 2015 (#15000324)	823 E. Long St. 39°58′02″N 82°58′45″W	No	
164^{†}	Third Avenue and North High Historic District	Third Avenue and North High Historic District	April 19, 1990 (#90000585)	N. High St. in the vicinity of 2nd and 3rd 39°58′59″N 83°00′17″W	No	
165^{#}	James Thurber House	James Thurber House	November 8, 1979 (#79001840)	77 Jefferson Ave. 39°57′57″N 82°59′07″W	Yes	
166^{#}	Toledo and Ohio Central Railroad Station	Toledo and Ohio Central Railroad Station	June 18, 1973 (#73001440)	379 W. Broad St. 39°57′38″N 83°00′39″W	No	
167^{#}	Tosheff's Restaurant and Hotel	Tosheff's Restaurant and Hotel	March 2, 2001 (#01000197)	1943-1953 Parsons Ave. 39°55′24″N 82°59′05″W	No	
168^{#}	Trinity Episcopal Church	Trinity Episcopal Church	November 13, 1976 (#76001427)	125 E. Broad St. 39°57′44″N 82°59′51″W	Yes	
169^{#}	Trinity German Evangelical Lutheran Church	Trinity German Evangelical Lutheran Church	October 10, 1985 (#85003132)	404 S. 3rd St. 39°57′15″N 82°59′47″W	No	
170^{#}	United States Carriage Company	United States Carriage Company	June 8, 2015 (#15000325)	309-319 S. 4th St. 39°57′22″N 82°59′43″W	Yes	
171^{#}	U.S. Post Office and Courthouse	U.S. Post Office and Courthouse	April 11, 1973 (#73001441)	121 E. State St. 39°57′36″N 82°59′50″W	Yes	
172^{#}	United States Post Office and Courthouse	United States Post Office and Courthouse	June 6, 2012 (#12000330)	85 Marconi Boulevard; 39°57′50″N 83°00′18″W	No	Now known as the Joseph P. Kinneary United States Courthouse
173^{#}	University, Hayes and Orton Halls	University, Hayes and Orton Halls	July 16, 1970 (#70000492)	The Oval on the Ohio State University campus 39°59′58″N 83°00′46″W	No	Partly demolished
174^{#}	Valley Dale Ballroom	Valley Dale Ballroom	December 17, 1982 (#82001462)	1590 Sunbury Rd. 40°00′08″N 82°56′14″W	Yes	
175^{#}	Vincent Walters House-Walters Music Academy	Vincent Walters House-Walters Music Academy	February 17, 2023 (#100008636)	225 North Monroe Ave. 39°58′11″N 82°58′42″W	No	
176^{#}	Welsbach Building	Welsbach Building	November 27, 1984 (#84000444)	116-118 E. Chestnut St. 39°58′06″N 82°59′55″W	No	
177^{#}	Welsh Presbyterian Church	Welsh Presbyterian Church	November 24, 1980 (#80003003)	315 E. Long St. 39°57′56″N 82°59′33″W	No	
178^{#}	West High School	West High School	September 6, 2022 (#100008068)	120 South Central Ave. 39°57′19″N 83°02′14″W	Yes	
179^{#}	Westminster Church	Westminster Church	September 24, 2001 (#01001043)	77 S. 6th St. 39°57′41″N 82°59′33″W	No	
180^{#}	Winders Motor Sales Company	Winders Motor Sales Company	October 18, 2019 (#100004542)	182 E. Long St. 39°57′56″N 82°59′46″W	Yes	
181^{#}	Wyandotte Building	Wyandotte Building	February 23, 1972 (#72001013)	21 W. Broad St. 39°57′43″N 83°00′05″W	No	
182^{#}	York Lodge No. 563	York Lodge No. 563	July 19, 1984 (#84003691)	1276 N. High St. 39°59′18″N 83°00′20″W	No	
183^{#}	Yuster Building	Yuster Building	July 3, 2017 (#100001268)	150 E. Broad St. 39°57′47″N 82°59′48″W	Yes	Now known as the Empire Building
184^{#}	Zettler Grocery and Hardware	Zettler Grocery and Hardware	June 27, 2014 (#14000354)	268 S. 4th St. 39°57′26″N 82°59′42″W	No	

== Former listings ==
	Name on the Register	Image	Date listed	Date removed	Location	CRHP-listed	Description
1^{†*}	Hartman Stock Farm Historic District	Hartman Stock Farm Historic District	October 9, 1974 (#74001492)	February 10, 2022	South of downtown Columbus on U.S. Route 23; 39°51′24″N 83°00′08″W	No	
2^{*}	Peruna Drug Manufacturing Company Building	Peruna Drug Manufacturing Company Building	March 14, 1973 (#73002288)	June 24, 1974	115 E. Rich St.	No	Demolished
3^{*}	Union Station Entrance	Union Station Entrance	January 17, 1974 (#74002344)	November 15, 1976	348 N. High St.	No	Demolished

== See also ==
- Columbus Register of Historic Properties
- List of National Historic Landmarks in Ohio
- National Register of Historic Places listings in Ohio
- National Register of Historic Places listings in Franklin County, Ohio
