= Columbus Transfer Company Warehouse =

- U.S. National Register of Historic Places
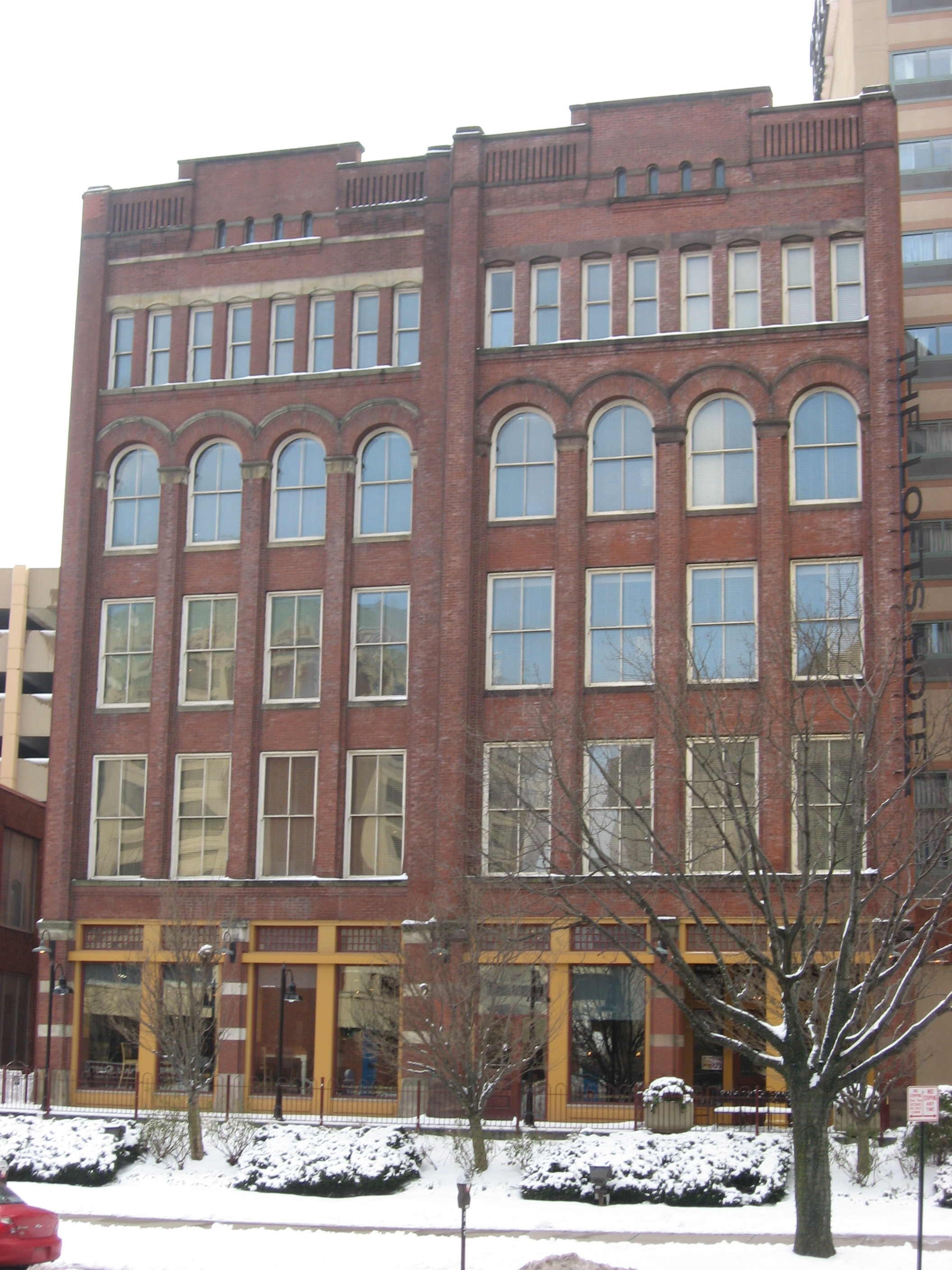
- Exterior in 2012
- Interactive map highlighting the building's location
- Location: 55 Nationwide Blvd., Columbus, Ohio
- Coordinates: 39.968695°N 83.000124°W
- Built: 1882
- NRHP reference No.: 83001966
- Added to NRHP: February 24, 1983

The Columbus Transfer Company Warehouse, also known as the Carr Building, is a historic building in Downtown Columbus, Ohio. It was built in two phases, in 1882 and 1900, and was listed on the National Register of Historic Places in 1983.

The building was rehabilitated from 1982 to 1983.

== See also ==
- National Register of Historic Places listings in Columbus, Ohio
