= Bradford Shoe Company Building =

- U.S. National Register of Historic Places
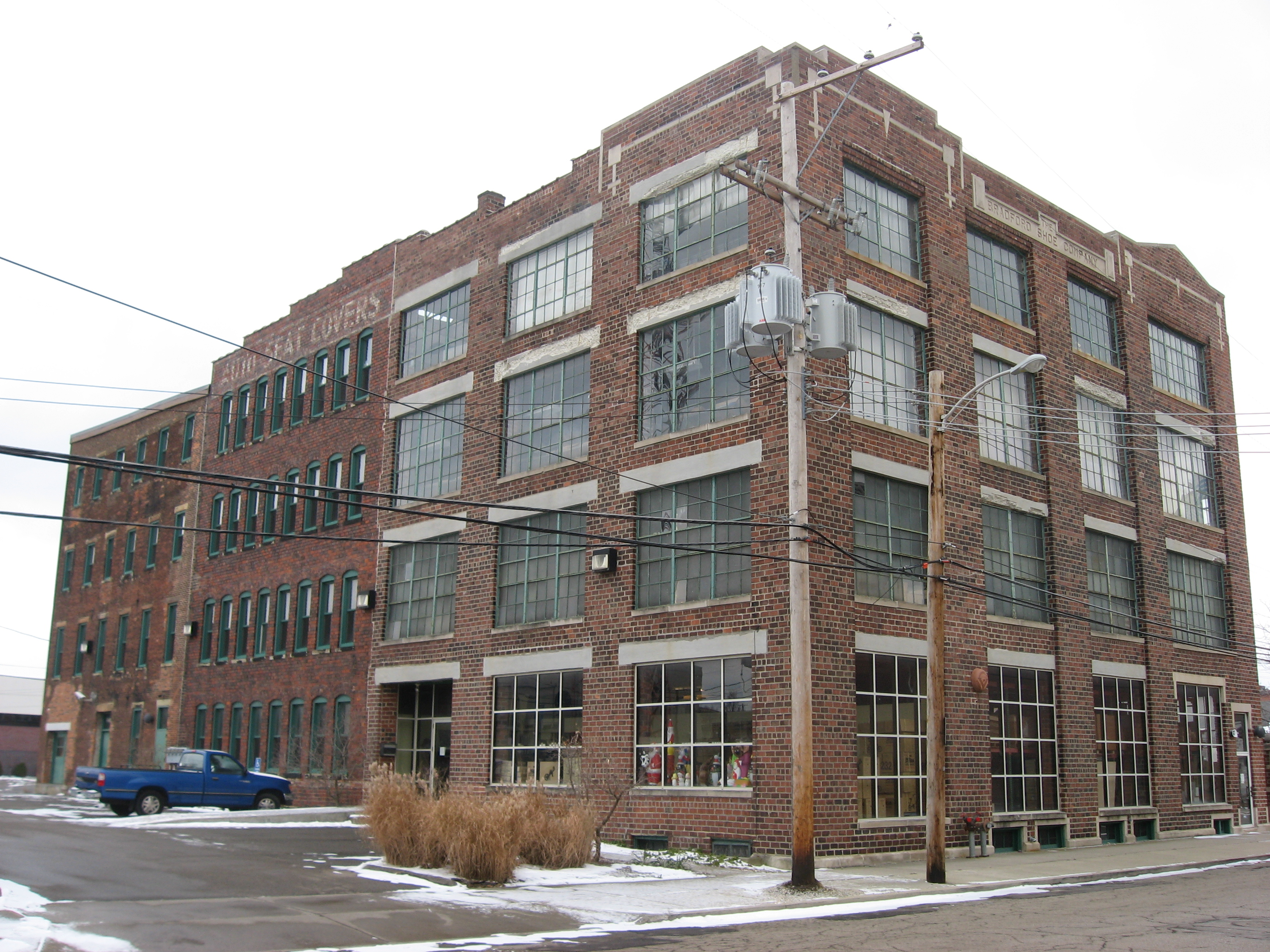
- Exterior in 2013
- Interactive map highlighting the building's location
- Location: 232 Neilston St., Columbus, Ohio
- Coordinates: 39.96798°N 82.99418°W
- Built: c. 1899
- NRHP reference No.: 94000772
- Added to NRHP: July 22, 1994

The Bradford Shoe Company Building, also known as the Neilston Building, is a historic building in Downtown Columbus, Ohio. It was listed on the National Register of Historic Places in 1994. The four-story building has three distinct parts, built at separate times. The eastern section was built before 1899, while the middle portion was built between 1899 and 1910, and the westernmost around 1910. The Bradford Shoe Company was founded in 1908, and commissioned the westernmost section's construction.

== See also ==
- National Register of Historic Places listings in Columbus, Ohio
