= Del Monte Apartments =

- U.S. National Register of Historic Places
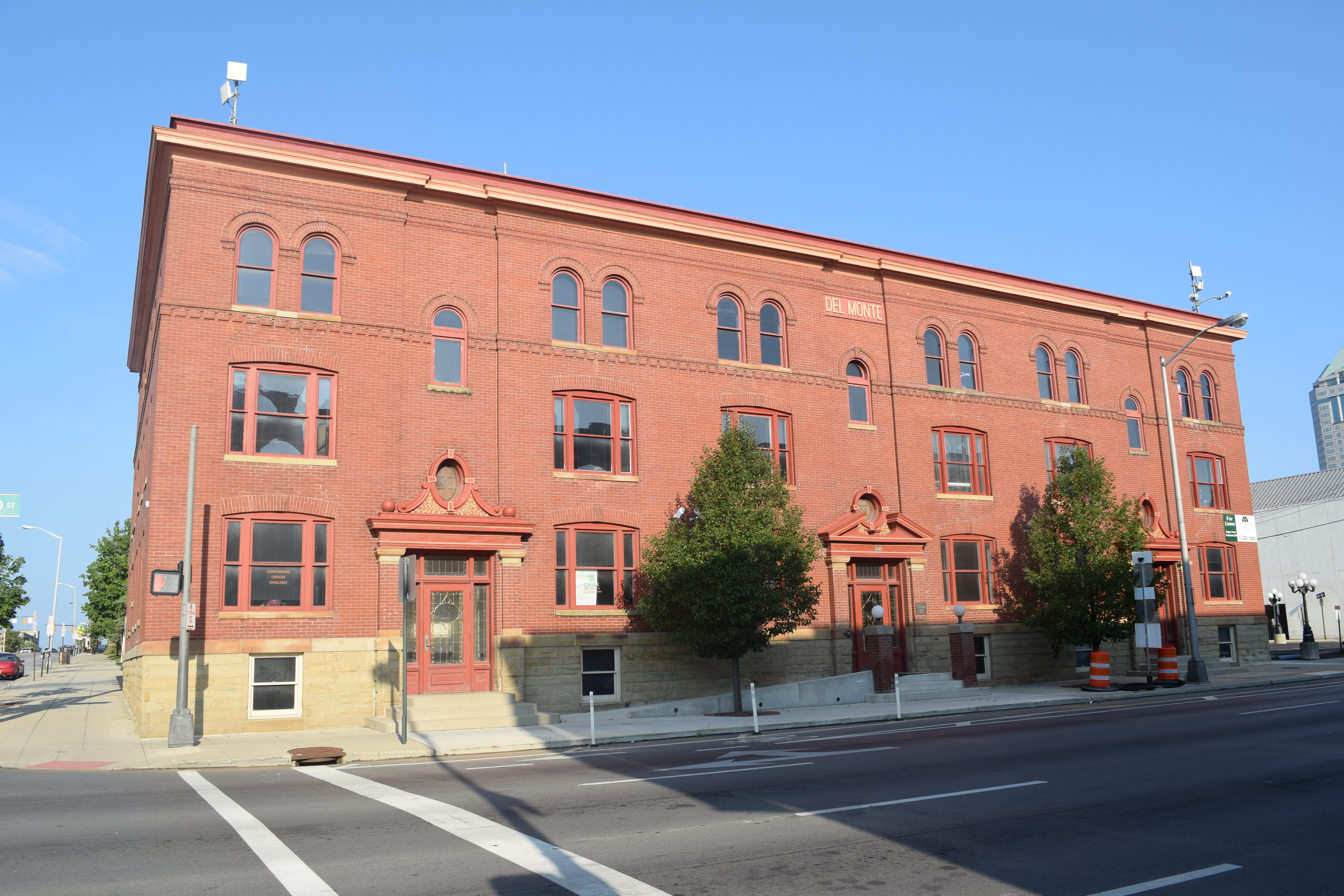
- Interactive map highlighting the building's location
- Location: 341-345 S. Third St., Columbus, Ohio
- Coordinates: 39.955349°N 82.996856°W
- Built: 1902
- Architect: Charles W. Bellows
- Architectural style: Romanesque Revival
- NRHP reference No.: 16000846
- Added to NRHP: December 13, 2016

The Del Monte Apartments is a historic building in Downtown Columbus, Ohio. It was built in 1902 and was listed on the National Register of Historic Places in 2016. The Romanesque Revival building was designed by Charles W. Bellows, a Columbus resident and nephew of George Bellows, builder of the 1887 Franklin County Courthouse in the city.

The building was constructed as a streetcar suburb-type apartment building with six flats on each of its three levels. The building interior was largely altered as it was converted for office use in 1985.

== See also ==
- National Register of Historic Places listings in Columbus, Ohio
