= Jonathan Noble House =

Historic house in Ohio, United States

- U.S. National Register of Historic Places
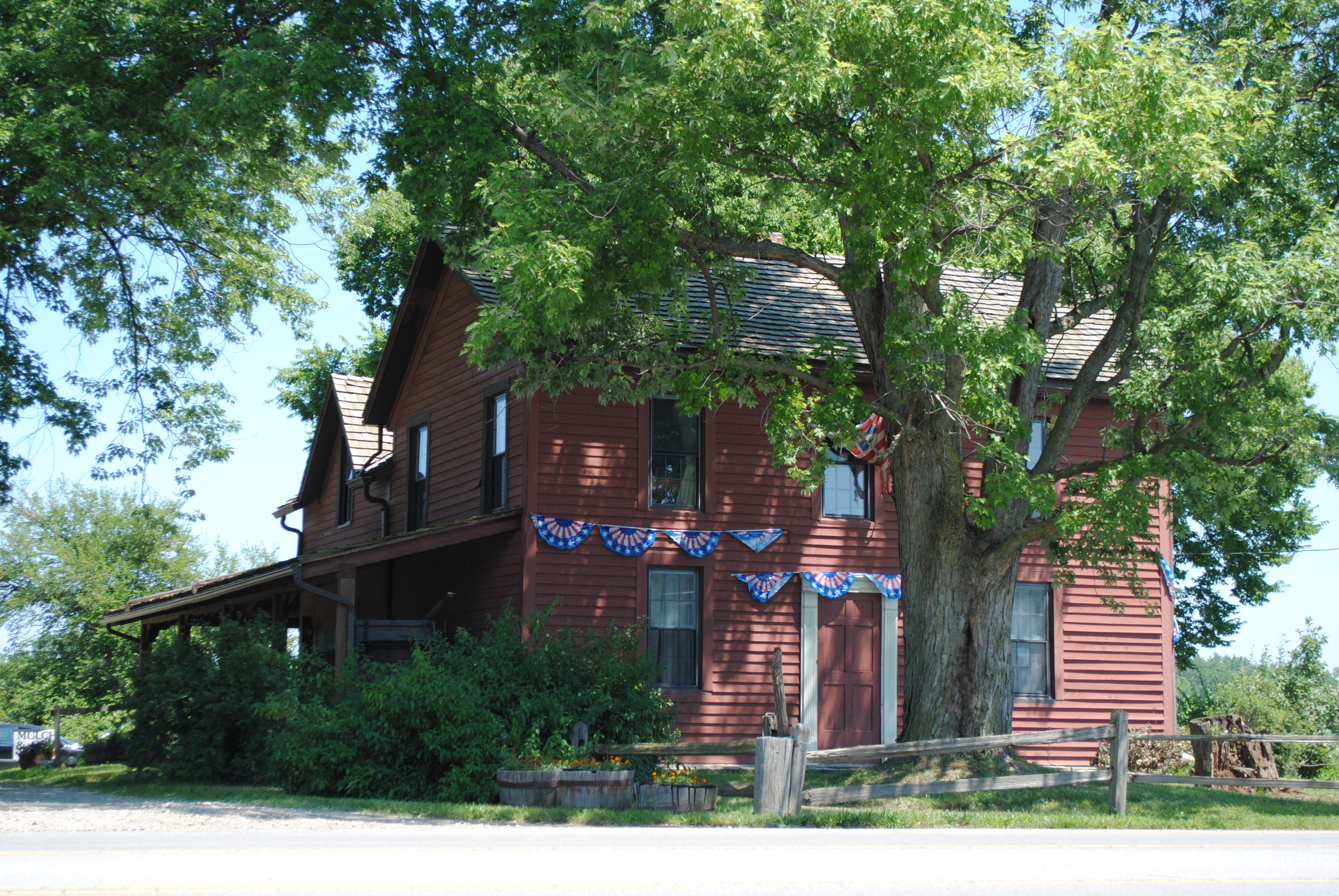
- Interactive map of Jonathan Noble House
- Location: 5030 Westerville Rd. (State Route 3), Columbus, Ohio
- Coordinates: 40.074817°N 82.928387°W
- Built: c. 1830
- NRHP reference No.: 75001400
- Added to NRHP: December 3, 1975

The Jonathan Noble House, also known as the Reiner Log House, is a historic house in Columbus, Ohio, United States. The house was built c. 1830 and was listed on the National Register of Historic Places in 1975. In 1975, it was the only known log house left in Blendon Township.

The house was originally hand-made with logs, with half-dovetail notching, and is estimated to have been built between 1825 and 1835. Many alterations were made over time, most of which appear to date to around 1915, but leaving the log structure sound.

== See also ==
- National Register of Historic Places listings in Columbus, Ohio
