= Franklin Park Medical Center =

- U.S. National Register of Historic Places
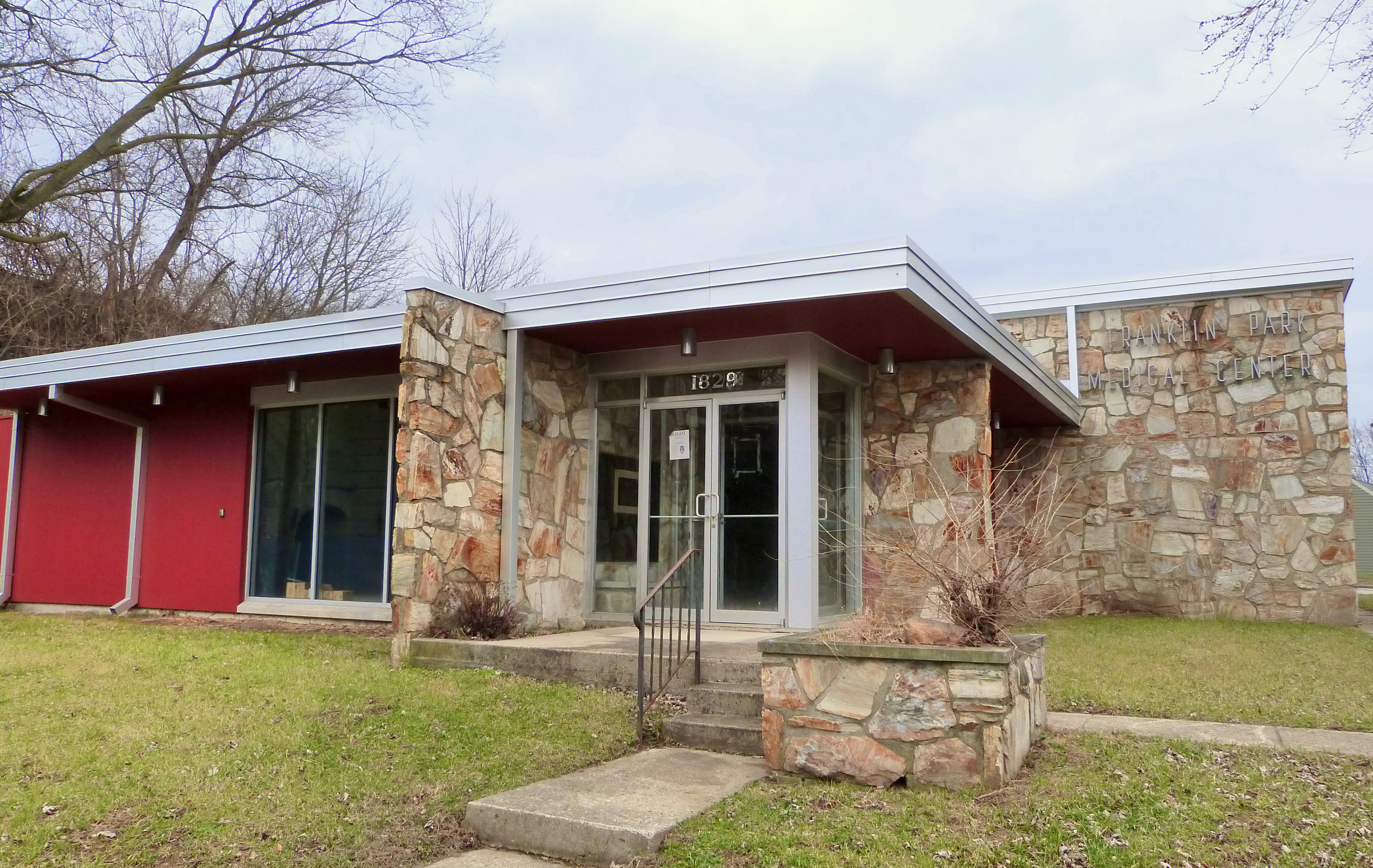
- Exterior in 2017
- Interactive map highlighting the building's location
- Location: 1829 East Long St., Columbus, Ohio
- Coordinates: 39.968671°N 82.952285°W
- Built: 1962
- Architect: Harold Schofield
- Architectural style: Modernist
- NRHP reference No.: 16000754
- Added to NRHP: November 2, 2016

Franklin Park Medical Center is a historic building in Woodland Park, Columbus, Ohio. It was built in 1962 and listed on the National Register of Historic Places in 2016. It is significant for its Modernist architecture, one of few remaining commercial buildings in the style in Columbus, and has influences from Frank Lloyd Wright's Prairie School.

The building is also significant for its African American community history. The practice was founded by five doctors who were experiencing discrimination and segregation. Their combined efforts at Franklin Park Medical Center allowed them to be successful. The medical center operated until 2009. Columbus Landmarks supported an effort to nominate it to the National Register and restore it in 2015, led by a son of one of the five founding doctors.

== See also ==
- National Register of Historic Places listings in Columbus, Ohio
