= Samuel Landes House =

Historic house in Ohio, United States

- U.S. National Register of Historic Places
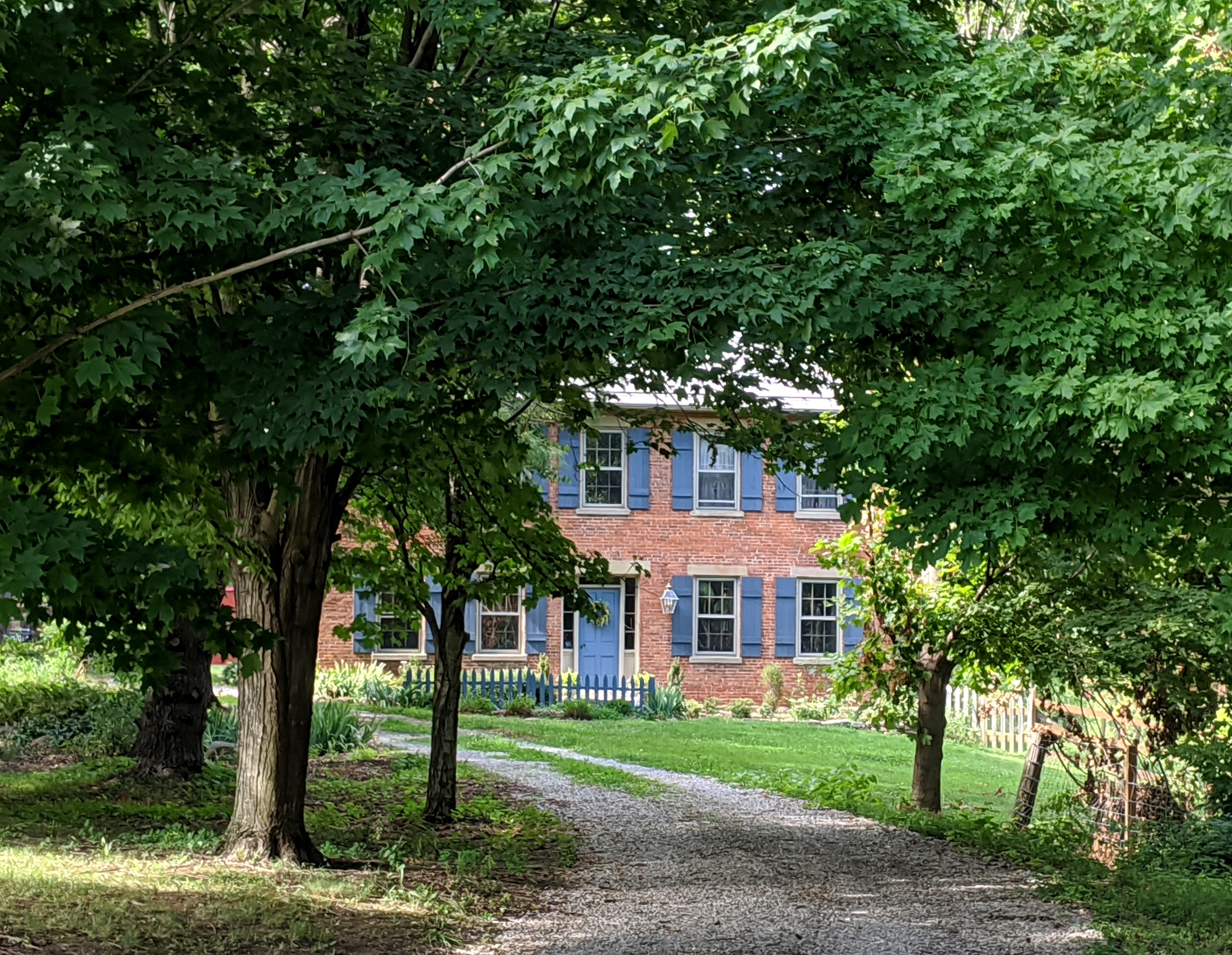
- Interactive map of Samuel Landes House
- Location: 590 Hibbs Rd., Columbus, Ohio
- Coordinates: 39.839775°N 83.018625°W
- Built: c. 1848
- Architectural style: Vernacular
- NRHP reference No.: 87000688
- Added to NRHP: May 8, 1987

The Samuel Landes House is a historic house in Columbus, Ohio, United States. The house was built c. 1848 and was listed on the National Register of Historic Places in 1987. The house is significant as a vernacular farmhouse. It was built for Samuel Landes, a prominent farmer in the area, and remained in his family until 1875.

== See also ==
- National Register of Historic Places listings in Columbus, Ohio
