= Griswold Memorial Young Women's Christian Association =

- U.S. National Register of Historic Places
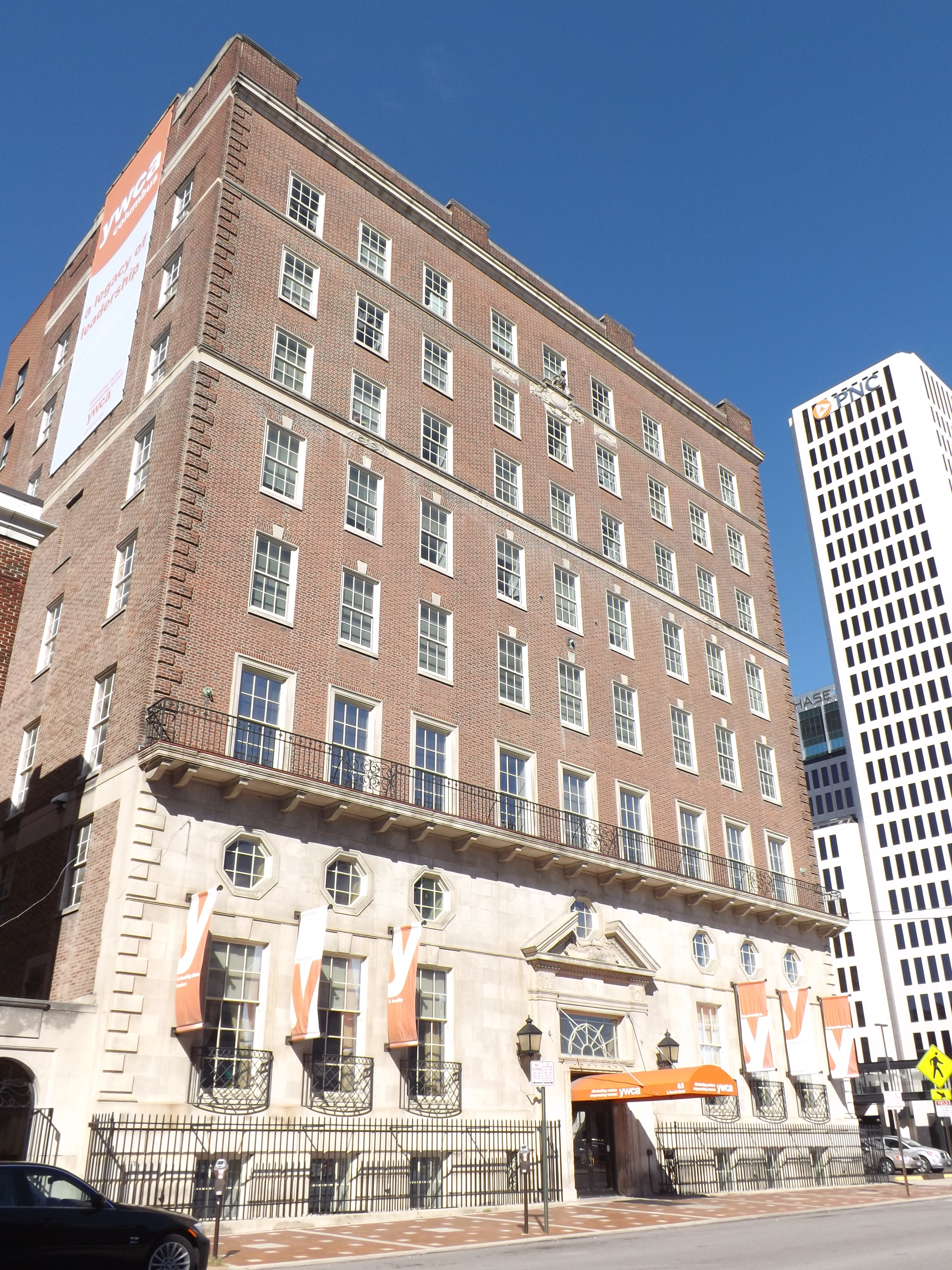
- Interactive map highlighting the building's location
- Location: 65 S. 4th St., Columbus, Ohio
- Coordinates: 39.961203°N 82.996389°W
- Built: 1929
- Architectural style: Second Italian Renaissance Revival
- NRHP reference No.: 93000671
- Added to NRHP: July 22, 1993

The Griswold Memorial Young Women's Christian Association, today known as the YWCA Center for Women, is a historic YWCA building in Downtown Columbus, Ohio. It was built in 1929 and was listed on the National Register of Historic Places in 1993. Renovations took place in 1963-64 and 1984. The building was named for Charles C. Griswold, and was a gift of his wife Mary, who donated about $400,000 to the YMCA's building fund.

The eight-story tower is built in the Second Italian Renaissance Revival style. It has a brick foundation, two stories of rusticated limestone, and an upper six stories of brick. There are five belt courses wrapping around the building.

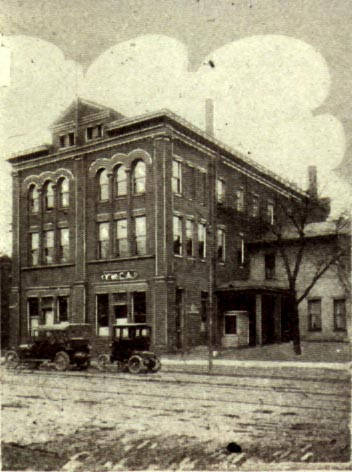
First home of the YWCA, 1913-1918

== See also ==
- National Register of Historic Places listings in Columbus, Ohio
