= Tosheff's Restaurant and Hotel =

- U.S. National Register of Historic Places
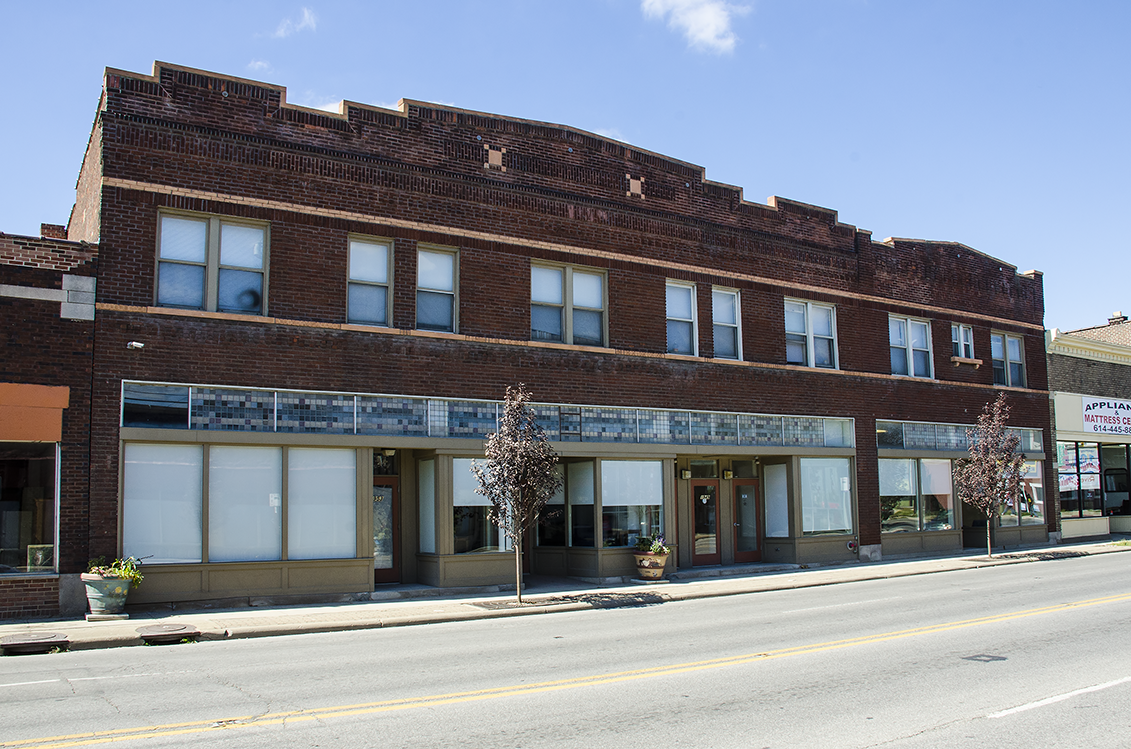
- Interactive map highlighting the building's location
- Location: 1943-1953 Parsons Ave., Columbus, Ohio
- Coordinates: 39.923344°N 82.984739°W
- Built: 1920
- NRHP reference No.: 01000197
- Added to NRHP: March 2, 2001

Tosheff's Restaurant and Hotel is a historic building in the Reeb-Hosack neighborhood of Columbus, Ohio. It was built in 1920 and was listed on the National Register of Historic Places in 2001. The restaurant and hotel are one of few remainders of the historic Steelton industrial area, and closely connected to the eastern European neighborhood there. The industrial district was centered on Parsons Avenue, and relied upon the Buckeye Steel Castings Company, American Rolling Mill Company, the Chase Foundry and Manufacturing Company, the Federal Glass Company, and the Seagraves firetruck manufacturing plant.

Tosheff's was one of the first commercial buildings, at a time when the area was still primarily residential. George Tosheff has opened a restaurant there in leased space by 1918 and lived directly above it. By 1923, the new building housed a jeweler, barber, men's clothing store, and a billiards hall. Tosheff's restaurant was located on the first floor, and his hotel on the second (the South End Hotel, later Tosheff's Hotel). Tosheff sold the restaurant near the start of World War II, and operated the hotel until he sold the entire building in 1965.

The two-story brick building appears as two side-by-side, but was built and completed at the same time, and joints connect them. Behind the middle third of the building lies a one-story addition which held hotel rooms, part of which was constructed c. 1920 and part c. 1947.

== See also ==
- National Register of Historic Places listings in Columbus, Ohio
