= Julian and Kokenge Company =

- U.S. National Register of Historic Places
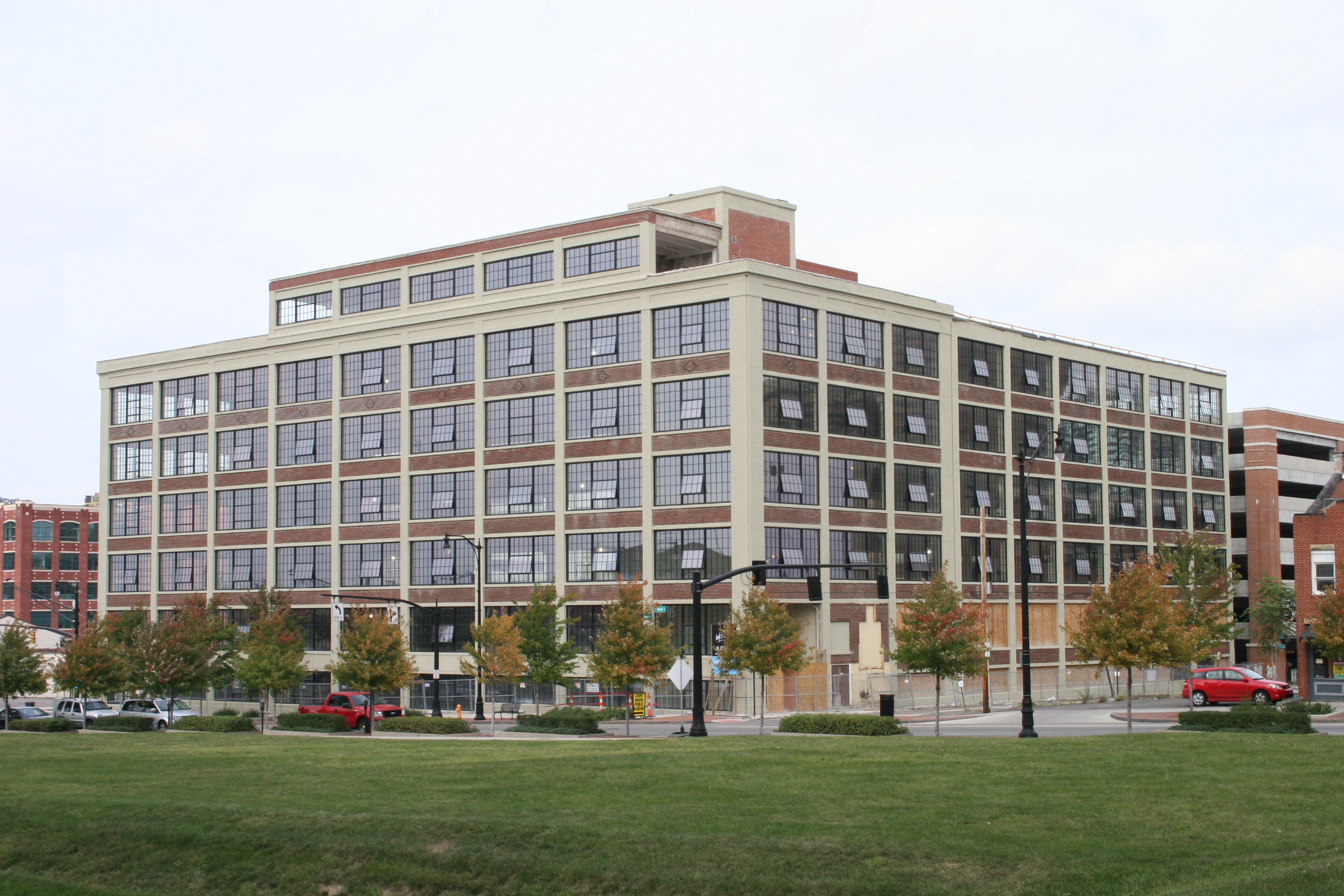
- Exterior in 2014
- Interactive map highlighting the building's location
- Location: 280 S. Front St., Columbus, Ohio
- Coordinates: 39.956254°N 83.000597°W
- Built: 1921 and 1932
- Architect: Frank Hill Smith Co.
- Architectural style: Commercial
- NRHP reference No.: 13000936
- Added to NRHP: December 12, 2013

The Julian and Kokenge Company building, now known as the Julian, is a historic building in the River South District of Downtown Columbus, Ohio. It was listed on the National Register of Historic Places in 2013.

The 120,000 sq ft (11,000 m^{2}) L-shaped building was constructed in two portions: the southern portion in 1921 along West Main St. and the eastern portion in 1932, extending north along Wall St. The building was the manufacturing plant of the Julian and Kokenge Co., a shoe company founded in Cincinnati in 1893. The company relocated to Columbus, constructing the building in 1921, designed by the Frank Hill Smith Co. of Dayton. The shoe company was headquartered here until shuttering in 1975. The Julian was renovated from 2014 to 2016, modifying the space into apartment units. The building's 85 percent window to wall ratio was seen as a positive for redevelopment, although a challenge while renovating: the windows were covered when the building was used as a storage facility in the 1970s. Another aspect that encouraged redevelopment was the L-shaped layout, allowing for light to all sides of the building.

== Gallery ==
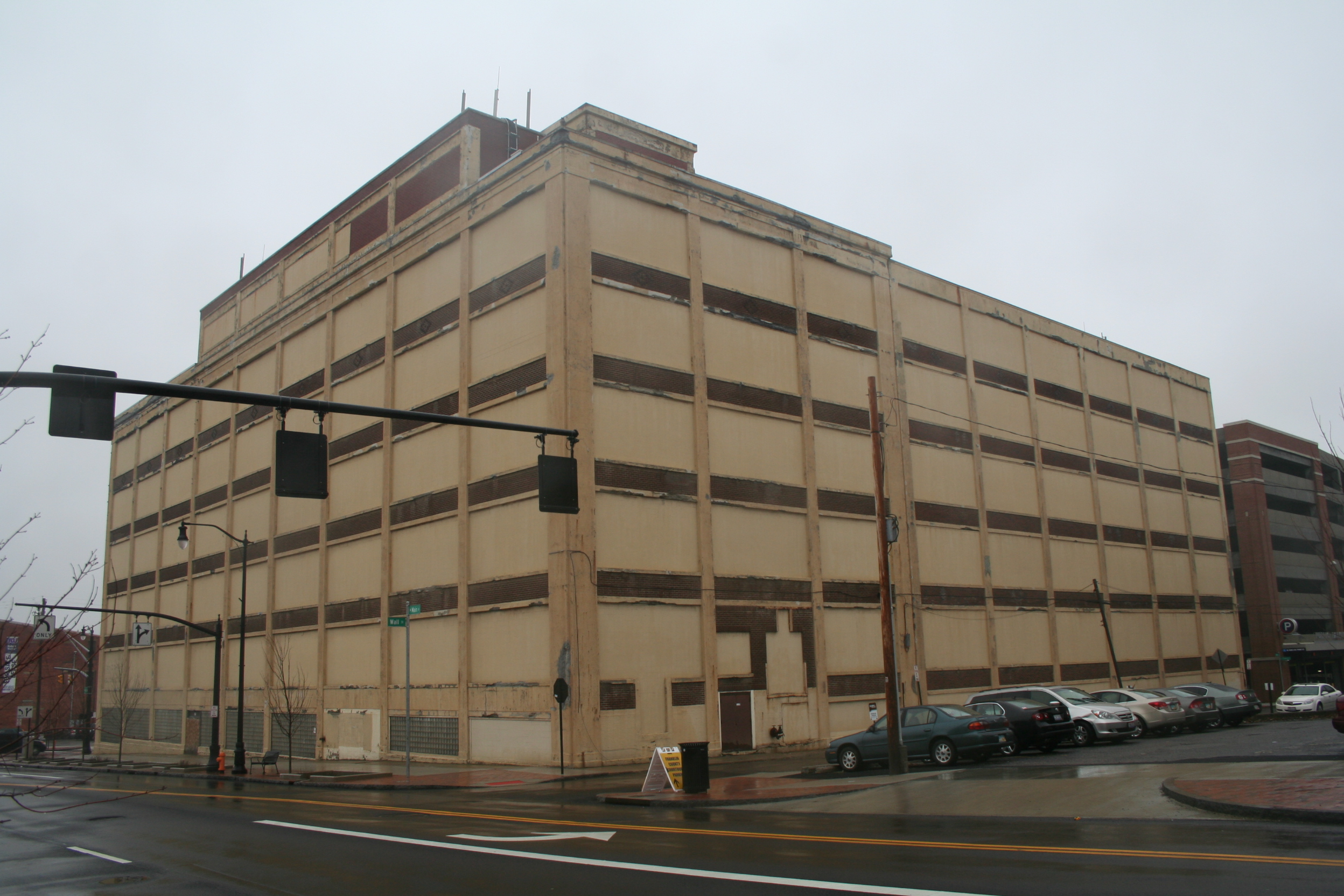
The building before renovation, 2012

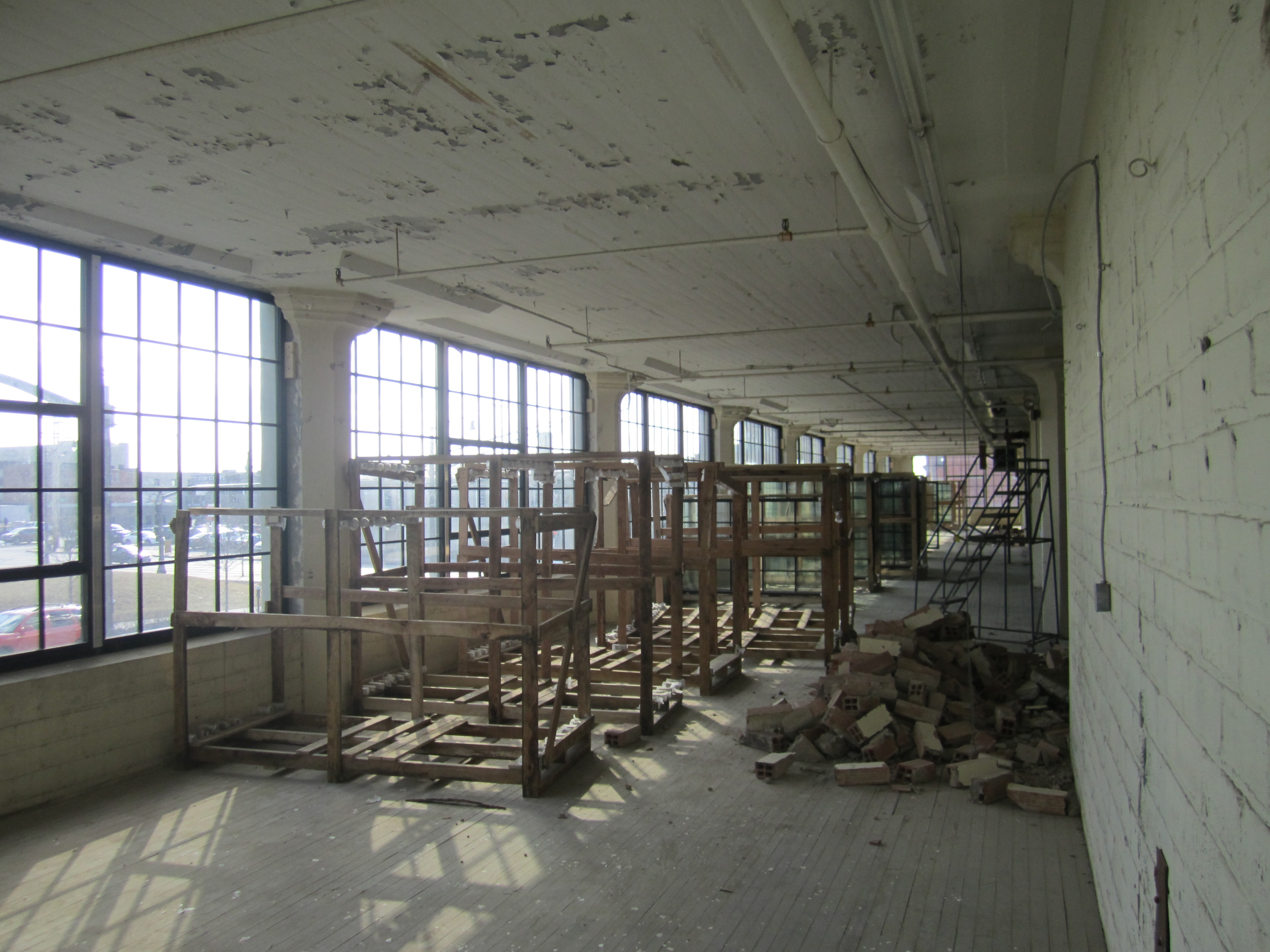
Interior during renovation, 2014

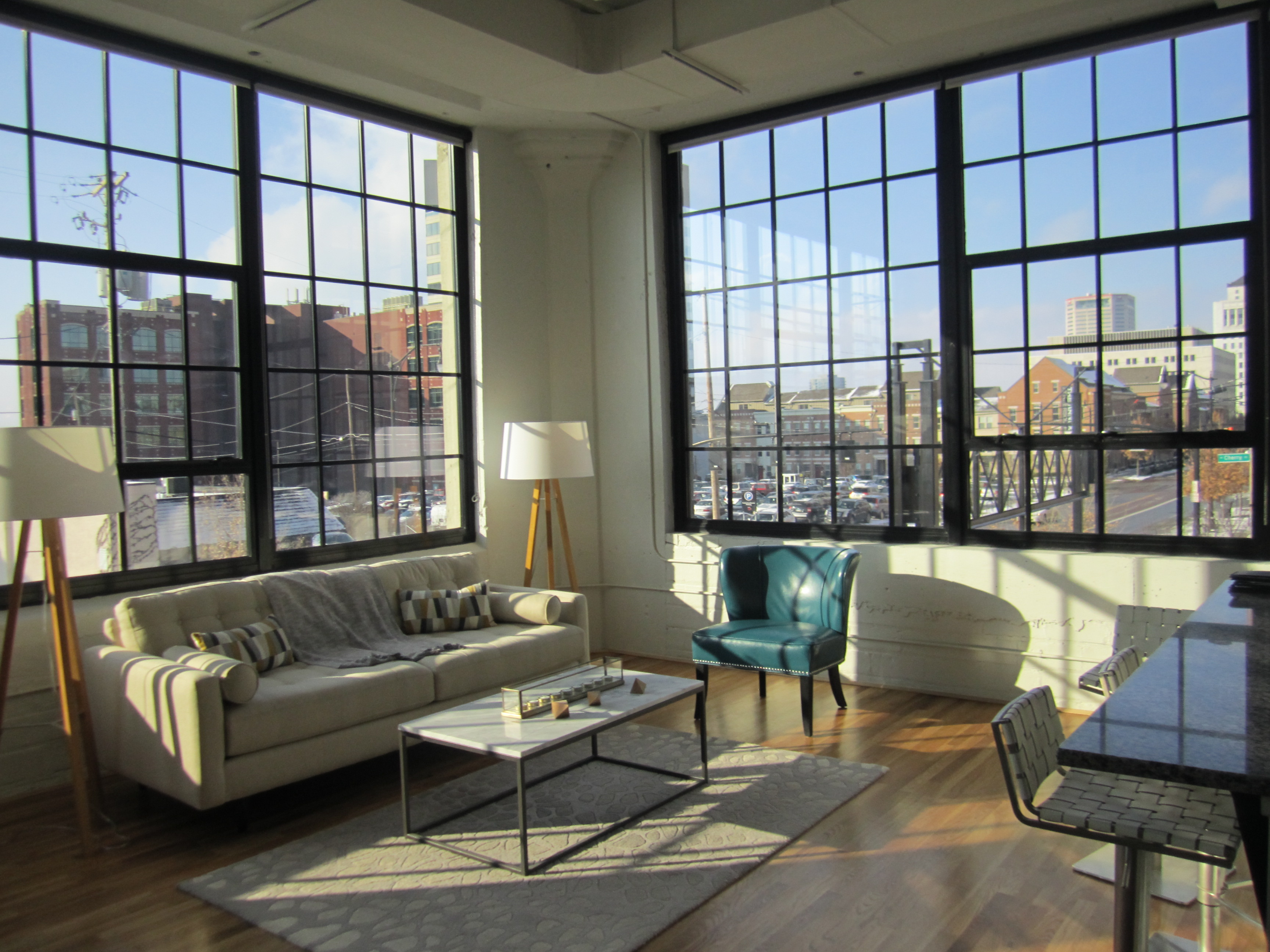
An apartment living room, 2016

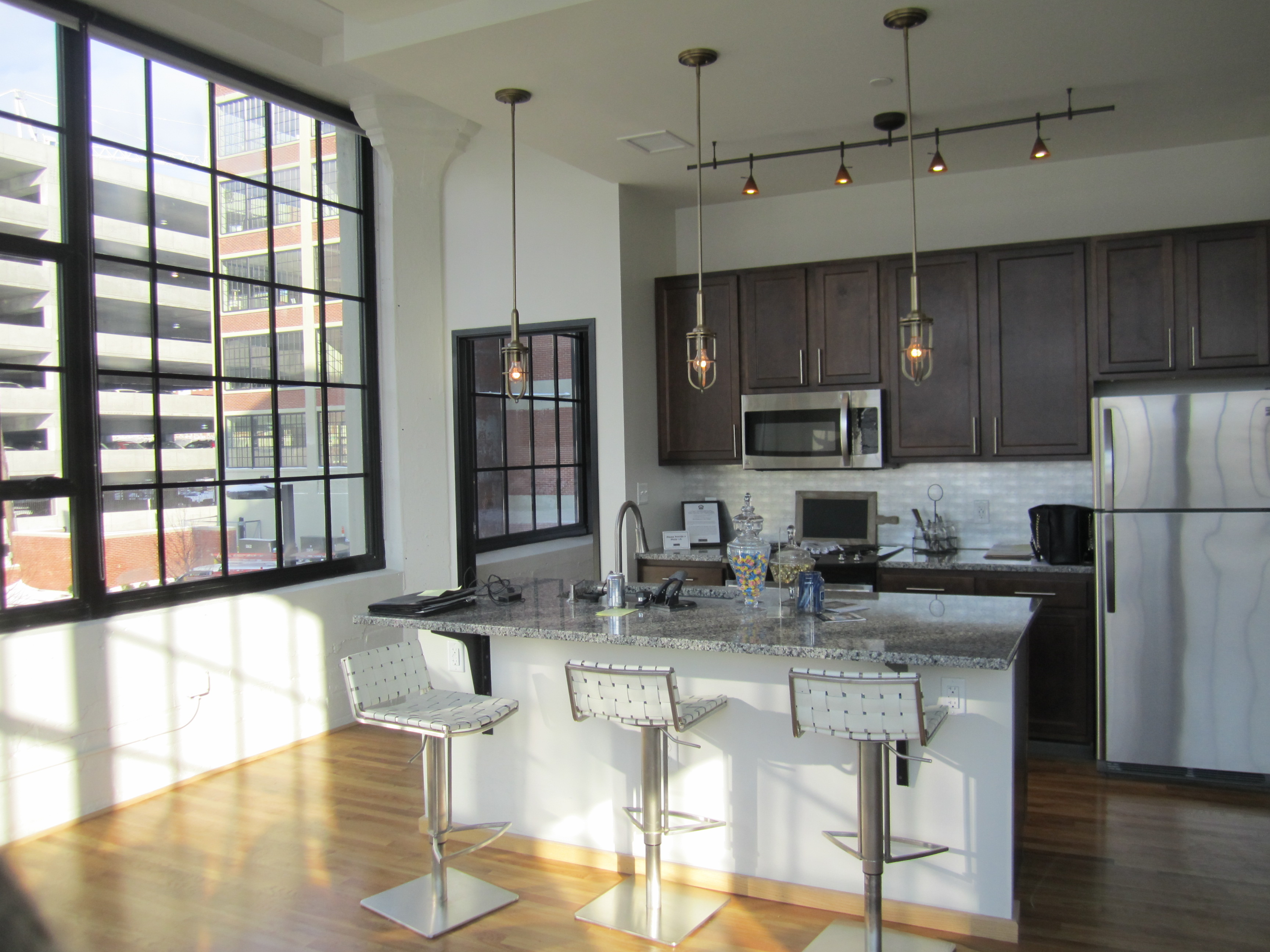
Renovated kitchen space, 2016

== See also ==
- National Register of Historic Places listings in Columbus, Ohio
