= Westminster Presbyterian Church (Columbus, Ohio) =

Historic church in Ohio, United States

- Westminster Church
- U.S. National Register of Historic Places
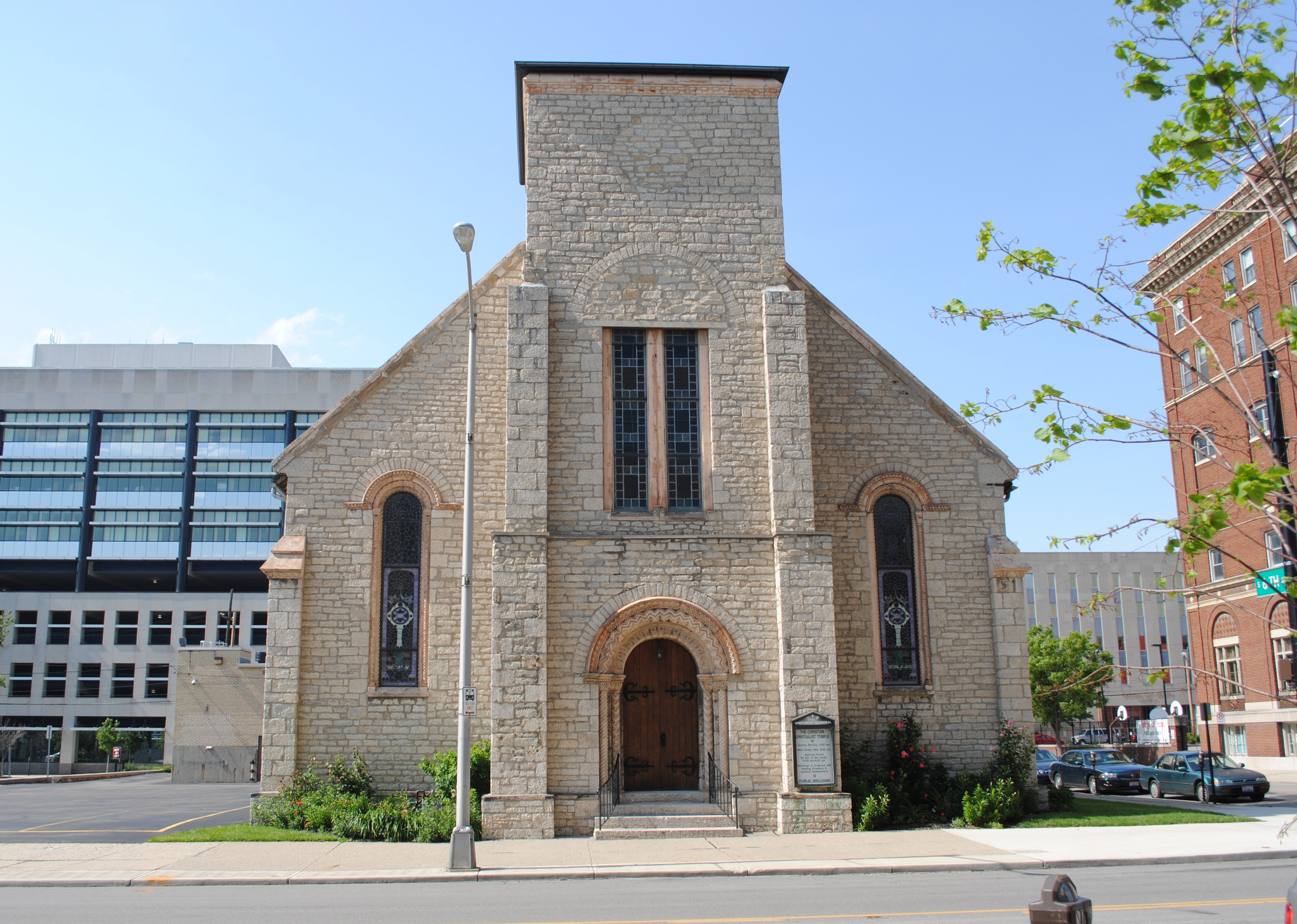
- Interactive map highlighting the church's location
- Location: 77 S. 6th St., Columbus, Ohio
- Coordinates: 39°57′41″N 82°59′35″W
- Area: less than one acre
- Built: 1857
- Architect: John Clark, et al.
- Architectural style: Romanesque
- NRHP reference No.: 01001043
- Added to NRHP: September 24, 2001

The former Westminster Presbyterian Church (also known as The First Spiritualist Temple) is a historic church building at 77 S. 6th Street in Columbus, Ohio. Built in 1857 in the Romanesque Revival style, it was originally home to Westminster Presbyterian Church. Spiritualists acquired the property after Westminster Presbyterian merged with another church circa 1900. The building was listed on the National Register of Historic Places in 2001.

This building is not related to the current Westminster Presbyterian Church, at 222 Schoolhouse Lane, on the west side of Columbus.

== See also ==
- National Register of Historic Places listings in Columbus, Ohio
