= Vincent Walters House-Walters Music Academy =

- U.S. National Register of Historic Places
- Interactive map highlighting the building's location
- Location: 225 N. Monroe Ave., Columbus, Ohio
- Coordinates: 39.969671°N 82.978563°W
- NRHP reference No.: 100008636
- Added to NRHP: February 17, 2023

The Vincent Walters House-Walters Music Academy is a historic house and former music academy in the King-Lincoln Bronzeville neighborhood of Columbus, Ohio. The house was listed on the National Register of Historic Places in 2023.

The music academy was founded in 1942 by Vincent Rodgers Walters, a graduate of Central High School, Virginia State, and the Ohio State University. Walters operated the music academy at the site for decades.

The house, in the historic Black neighborhood of King-Lincoln Bronzeville, is currently owned by Jodi Spencer. Spencer spent years working to save the building, and was involved in its nomination to the National Register.

== See also ==
- National Register of Historic Places listings in Columbus, Ohio
