= Beatty-Moore House =

- U.S. National Register of Historic Places
- Interactive map highlighting the building's location
- Location: 41 N. Monroe Ave., Columbus, Ohio
- Coordinates: 39.965793°N 82.978974°W
- Built: 1900-1903
- Architectural style: Arts and Crafts
- NRHP reference No.: 100008631
- Added to NRHP: February 17, 2023

The Beatty-Moore House is a historic house in the King-Lincoln Bronzeville neighborhood of Columbus, Ohio. The house was listed on the National Register of Historic Places in 2023. The two and a half-story building was designed in the Arts and Crafts style and was constructed between 1900 and 1903.

== See also ==
- National Register of Historic Places listings in Columbus, Ohio
