= Long and Third Commercial Building =

- U.S. National Register of Historic Places
- South facade, 1981
- Interactive map highlighting the building's location
- Location: 104-114 E. Long St., Columbus, Ohio
- Coordinates: 39.9655110°N 82.998227°W
- Built: c. 1900
- Architectural style: Second Renaissance Revival
- NRHP reference No.: 82003569
- Added to NRHP: July 1, 1982

The Long and Third Commercial Building was a historic building in Downtown Columbus, Ohio. It was listed on the National Register of Historic Places in 1982. The four-story building was constructed in the Second Renaissance Revival style.

The building, completed c. 1900, was one of few remaining turn-of-the-century commercial buildings in Downtown Columbus. It was also significant for its unusually high level of detail and fine craftsmanship. Over its life, the building housed over 45 different tenants. Some of the most notable were the Columbus-New Albany-Johnstown Traction Company, an early interurban streetcar company, the Eugene Gallagher cigar company, the Voisinet Garment Company, Pappas' Philadelphia Restaurant, and the Sportsman's Grill Restaurant. At the time of its National Register nomination, the building was deteriorating, and its owners sought an extensive rehabilitation benefited by historic preservation tax credits.

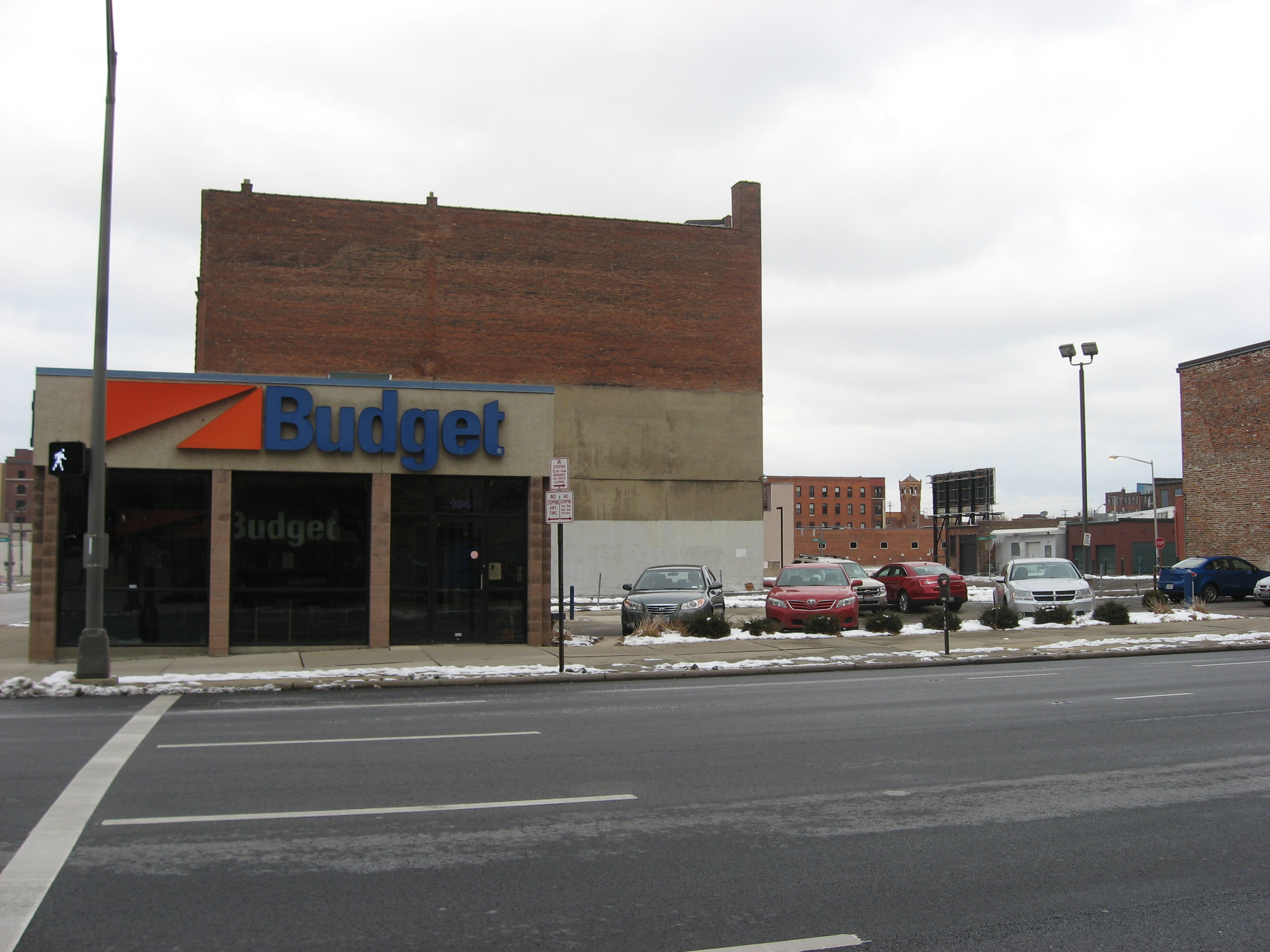
Site in 2010

== See also ==
- National Register of Historic Places listings in Columbus, Ohio
