= Coe Mound =

Native American burial mound in Columbus, Ohio

- Location: Sharon Township, Columbus, Ohio
- Area: Less than 10 acres
- Built: c. 500 B.C. – 500 A.D.
- Owner: Columbus Recreation and Parks Department

U.S. National Register of Historic Places
- Designated: July 18, 1974
- Reference no.: 74001486

The Coe Mound is a Native American burial mound in Columbus, Ohio. The mound was created around 2,000 years ago by the Pre-Columbian Native American Adena or Hopewell culture. The site was added to the National Register of Historic Places in 1974.

The mound is one of the largest in the vicinity of Columbus, and one of few not seriously disturbed by unauthorized digging. The site is not known to have been subject to any archaeological investigations. The mound was first reported as conical, ten feet tall, and 75 feet in diameter. By 1887, it had been "almost leveled" through cultivation in the area, and it now stands four feet high and 70 feet in diameter. The mound floor, structure remains, and burials are presumed to be intact beneath the mound. Without excavation, it is difficult to tell whether the mound was constructed by the Adena (c. 500 B.C. – 400 A.D.) or the Hopewell (c. 300 B.C. – 500 A.D.). The nearby presence of the Jeffers Mound suggests that the mound was built by the Hopewell, and inters high-status members of their society.

The mound was one of two within the study area during the construction of Ohio State Route 315 (the Olentangy Freeway). In 1972, the City of Columbus notified the Ohio Department of Transportation (ODOT) that the mound was within the area of a proposed ramp between Bethel Road and the highway. This prompted the city, ODOT, and the Ohio Historical Society to coordinate its nomination to the National Register. The mound's site was fenced off, and the highway project was altered to not disturb the site.

Resources about the site, including its National Register of Historic Places nomination, are restricted under the Archaeological Resources Protection Act of 1979.

== See also ==
- National Register of Historic Places listings in Columbus, Ohio
