= Zettler Grocery and Hardware =

- U.S. National Register of Historic Places
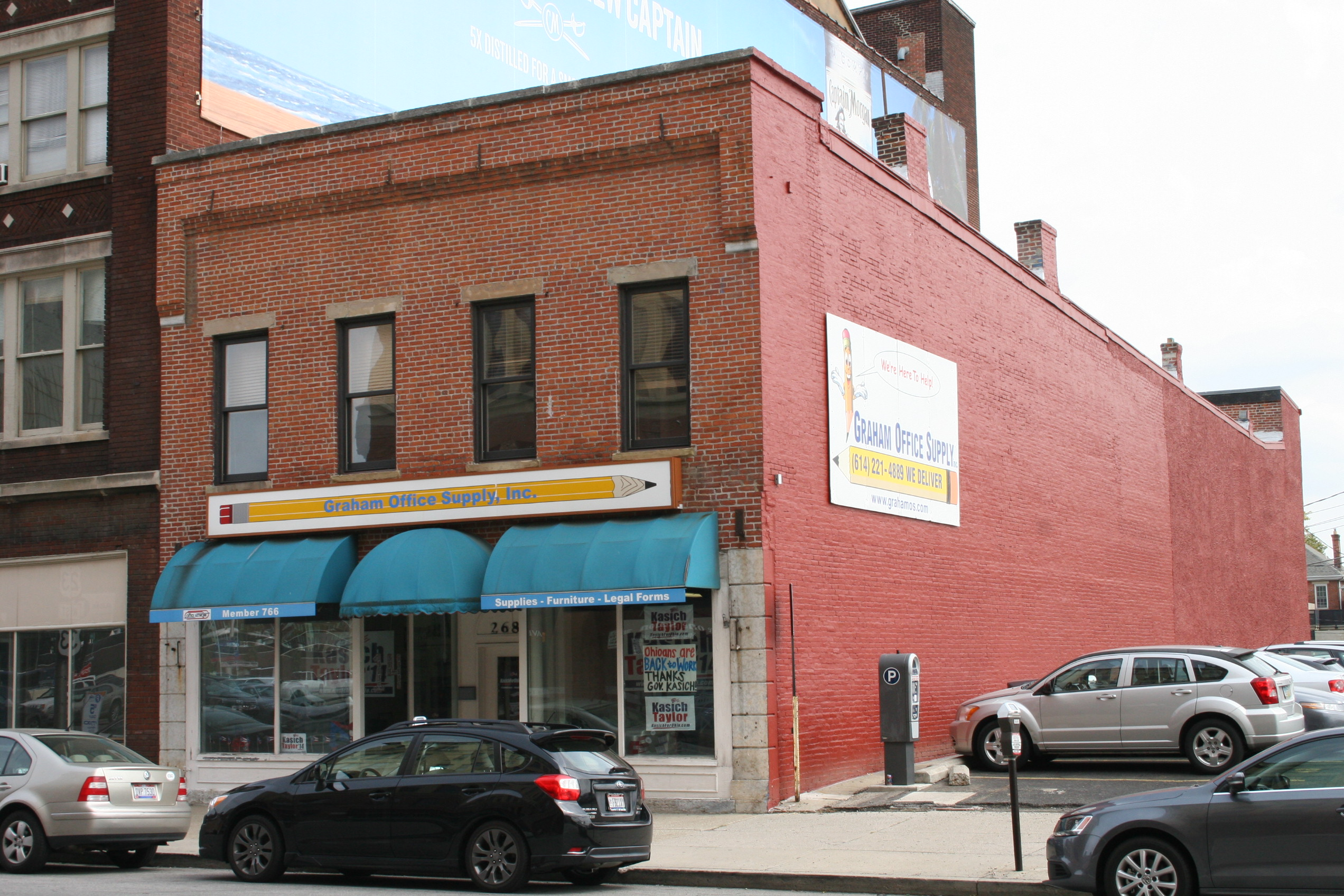
- The building in 2014
- Interactive map highlighting the building's location
- Location: 268 S. 4th St., Columbus, Ohio
- Coordinates: 39.957147°N 82.994822°W
- Built: c. 1880
- Architectural style: Commercial
- NRHP reference No.: 14000354
- Added to NRHP: June 27, 2014

The Zettler Grocery and Hardware building is a historic building in Downtown Columbus, Ohio. It was built c. 1880 and listed on the National Register of Historic Places in 2014. The building was built for the Zettler Grocery Co., founded around 1880 by Louis Zettler. In 1909, the business closed, and it was leased to other groceries, including Kroger's Grocery (the modern day Kroger Company). Zettler Hardware Co. (founded by Zettler in 1886) moved into the space in 1925, occupying it until 1940. The hardware company moved into another space downtown, and has since expanded to several locations around Central Ohio. The business is still owned by the Zettler family, and is the oldest hardware retailer in Columbus. The building at 268 S. 4th St. was owned by the Zettler family and leased to various companies until 2002, when it was sold to an office supply company. The supply company occupied the building until 2012. Since 2015, the building has housed a local pizzeria.

== See also ==
- National Register of Historic Places listings in Columbus, Ohio
