= Trinity German Evangelical Lutheran Church =

Historic church in Ohio, United States

- U.S. National Register of Historic Places
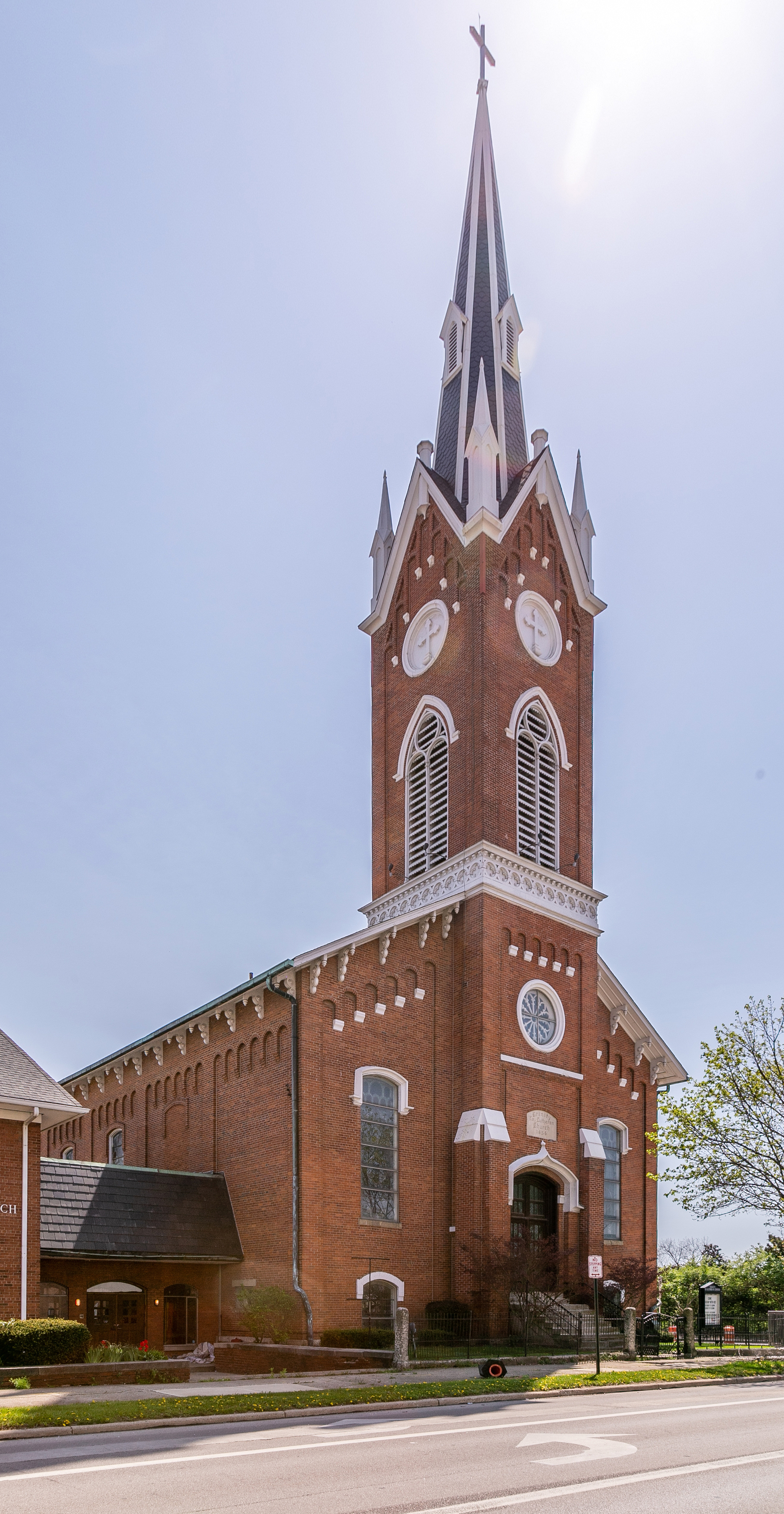
- Front of the church
- Interactive map highlighting the church's location
- Location: 404 S. Third St., Columbus, Ohio
- Coordinates: 39°57′15″N 82°59′47″W
- Area: less than one acre
- Built: 1856
- Architect: George Kannemacher
- Architectural style: Gothic, Romanesque
- NRHP reference No.: 85003132
- Added to NRHP: October 10, 1985

Trinity Evangelical Lutheran Church (previously known as Trinity German Evangelical Lutheran Church) is a historic Lutheran church at 404 S. Third Street in Columbus, Ohio.

It was built in 1856 and was added to the National Register of Historic Places in 1985.

== See also ==
- National Register of Historic Places listings in Columbus, Ohio
