= Born Capital Brewery Bottling Works =

- U.S. National Register of Historic Places
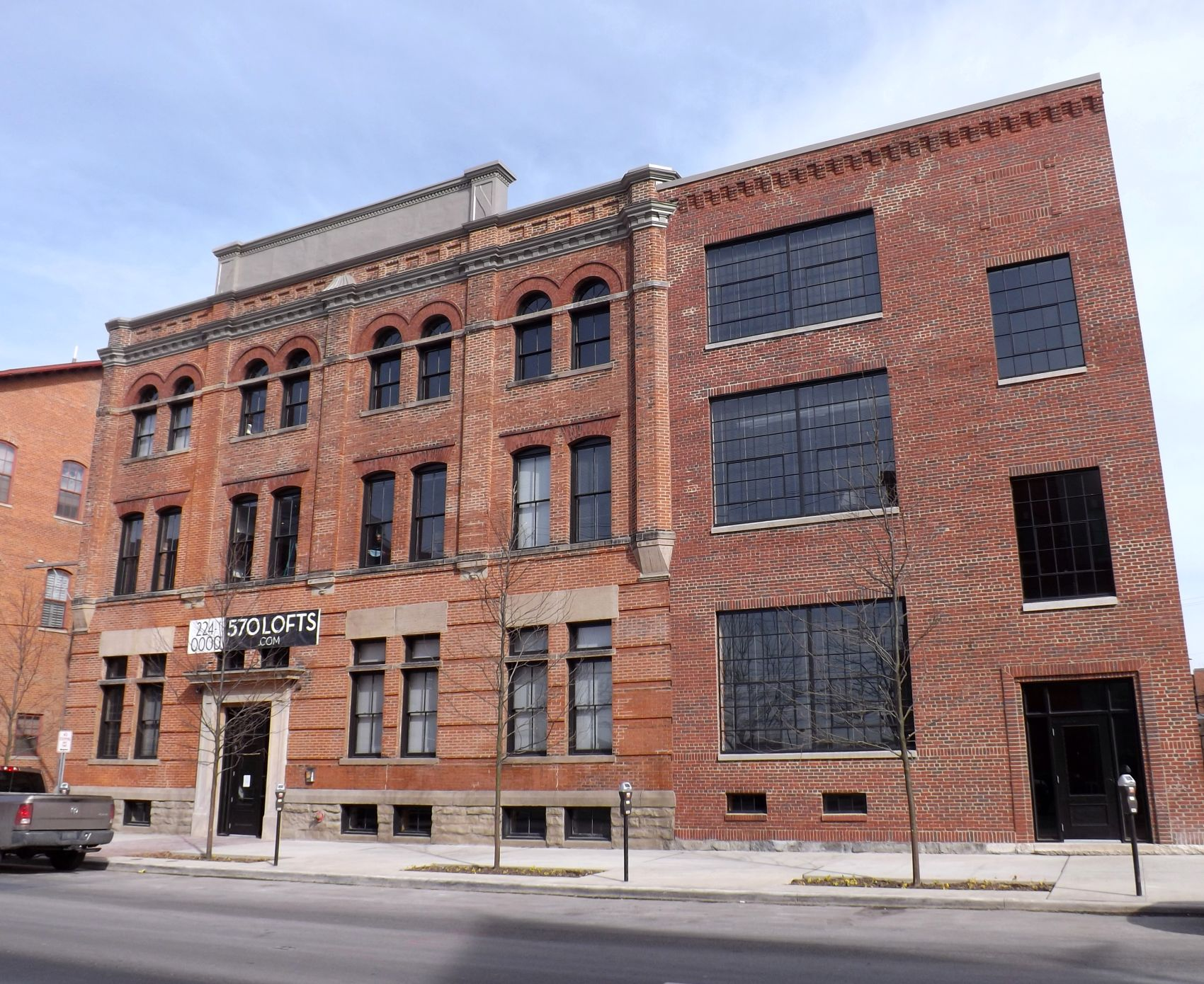
- Exterior in 2013
- Interactive map highlighting the building's location
- Location: 570 S. Front St., Columbus, Ohio
- Coordinates: 39.95014°N 82.99980°W
- Built: 1895
- Architectural style: Romanesque Revival
- NRHP reference No.: 09000442
- Added to NRHP: June 18, 2009

The Born Capital Brewery Bottling Works is a historic building in the Brewery District of Columbus, Ohio. It was listed on the National Register of Historic Places in 2009.

The three-story building is the only remaining portion of Born Capital Brewery, once one of four German breweries in the area. The building was completed in 1895. It later became a Salvation Army thrift store. The structure was sold for redevelopment in 2007, and added to the National Register for tax credits in 2009. Redevelopment into apartments began around 2011. The $10 million project created 47 apartment units. The exterior was left largely unchanged, and interior beams and walls were kept.

== Gallery ==
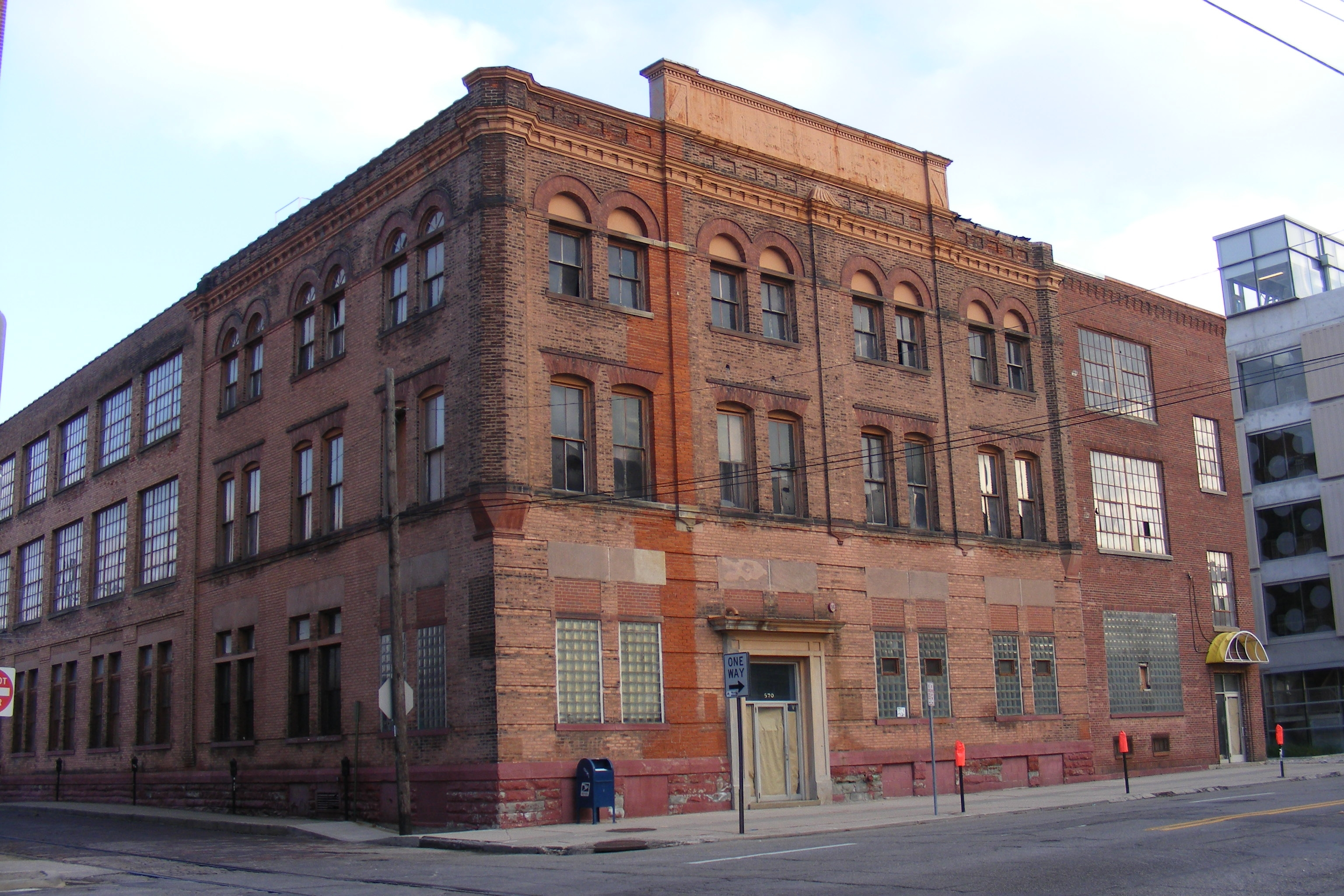
Exterior in 2008

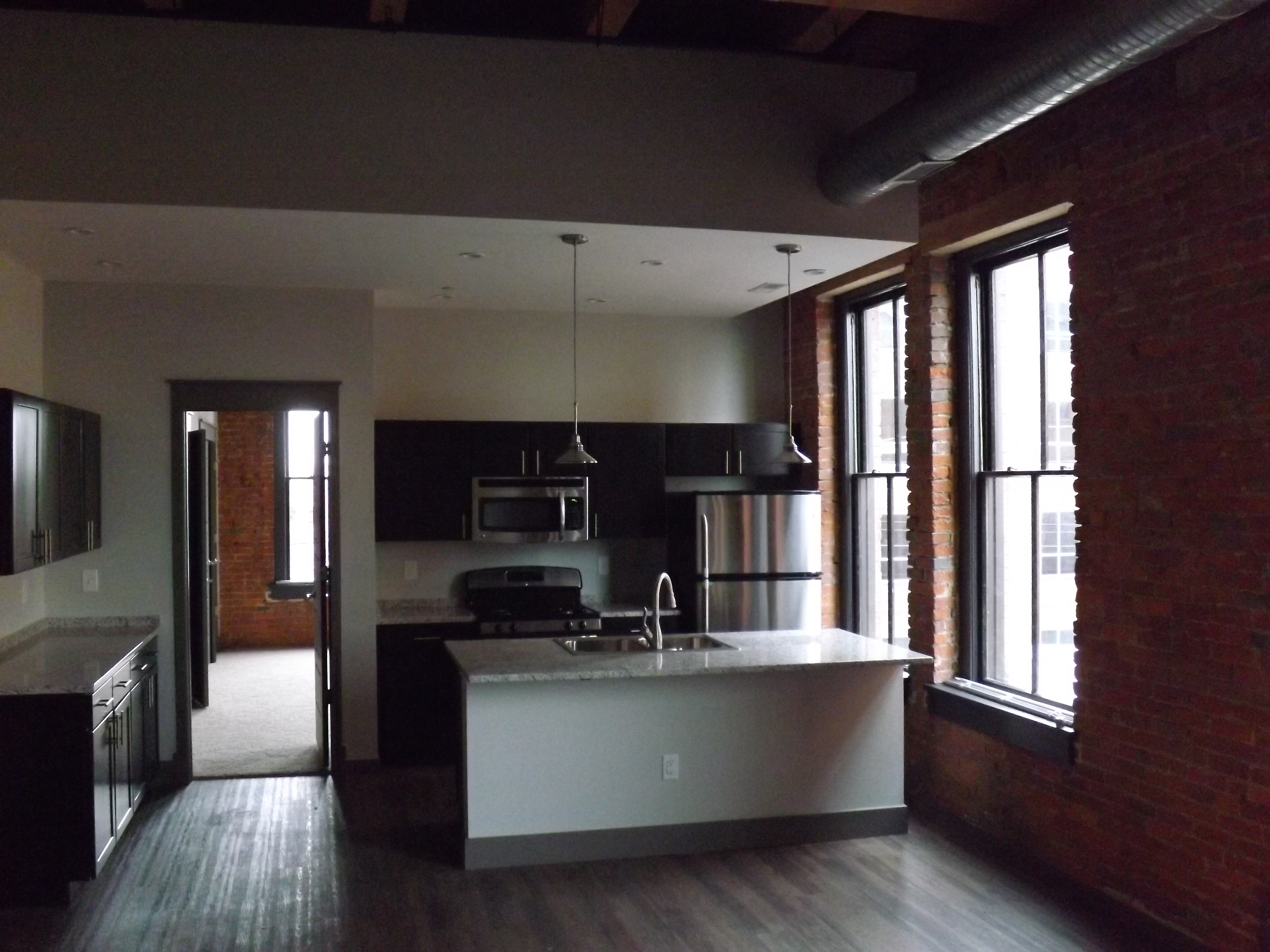
A renovated unit

== See also ==
- National Register of Historic Places listings in Columbus, Ohio
