= The Edna (Columbus, Ohio) =

- U.S. National Register of Historic Places
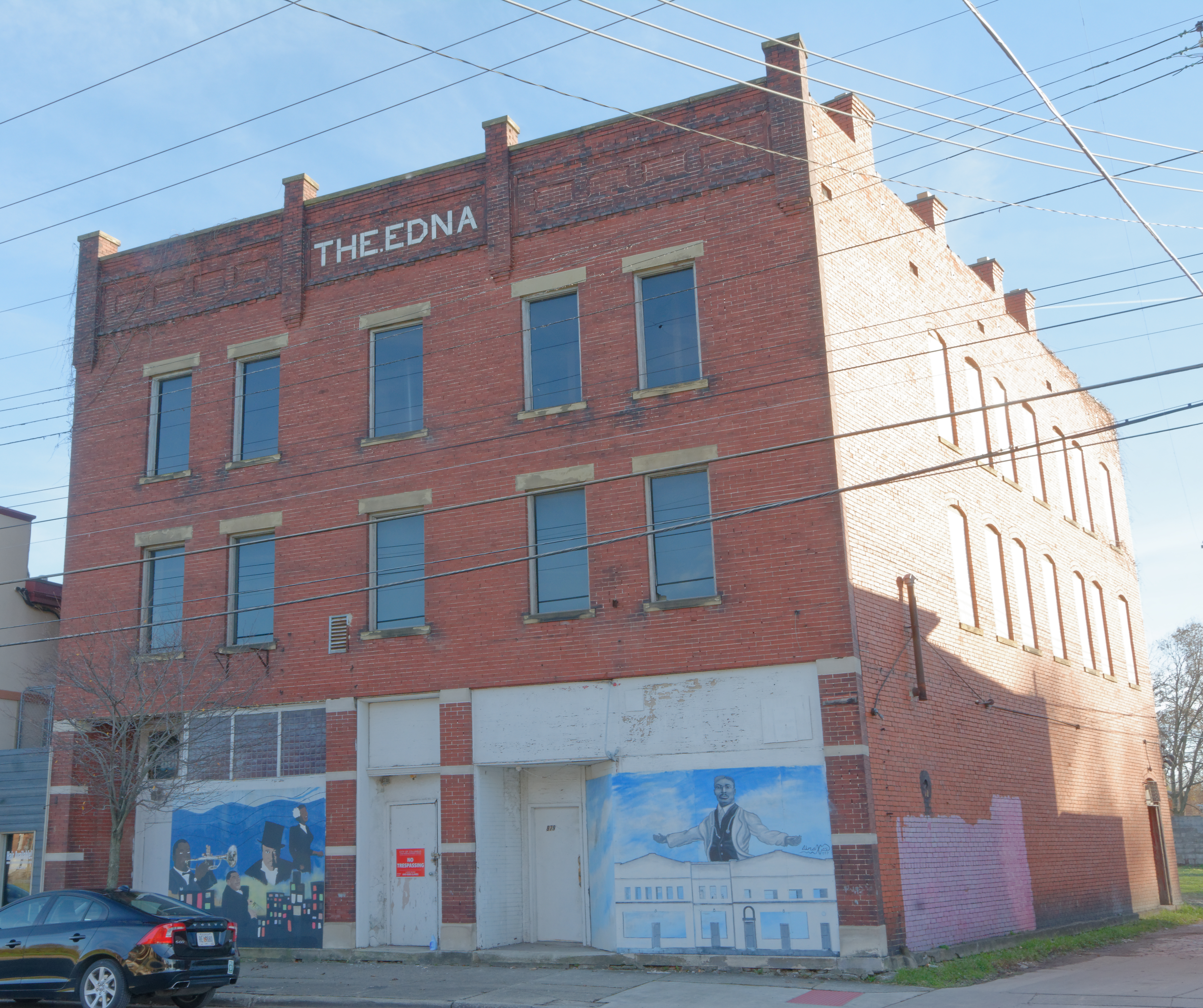
- Interactive map highlighting the building's location
- Location: 877-881 E. Long St., Columbus, Ohio
- Coordinates: 39.967454°N 82.977721°W
- Built: 1905
- NRHP reference No.: 100000665
- Added to NRHP: February 21, 2017

The Edna is a historic building in the King-Lincoln Bronzeville neighborhood of Columbus, Ohio. It was built in 1905 and was listed on the National Register of Historic Places in 2017. The three-story brick building has 8,694 sq ft (807.7 m^{2}). It was associated with the migration of African Americans to northern cities, including then-segregated Columbus. Businesses at the time had to cater to Blacks or whites; this building housed the Fireside Mutual Aid Association, an insurance company for Black residents. The building later housed the African American newspaper the Ohio Sentinel, as well as the Dukes and Duchesses, a private upscale social club for African Americans. The building is now owned by the City of Columbus, which requested proposals for the property from developers in 2009.

In 2022, it was announced that the county land bank, the Central Ohio Community Improvement Corporation, will purchase, restore, and move into the building, and use some space in the building to rent to other organizations. The project is estimated to be completed in spring 2023 at a cost of $2.5-3 million.

== See also ==
- National Register of Historic Places listings in Columbus, Ohio
