= Theresa Building =

- U.S. National Register of Historic Places
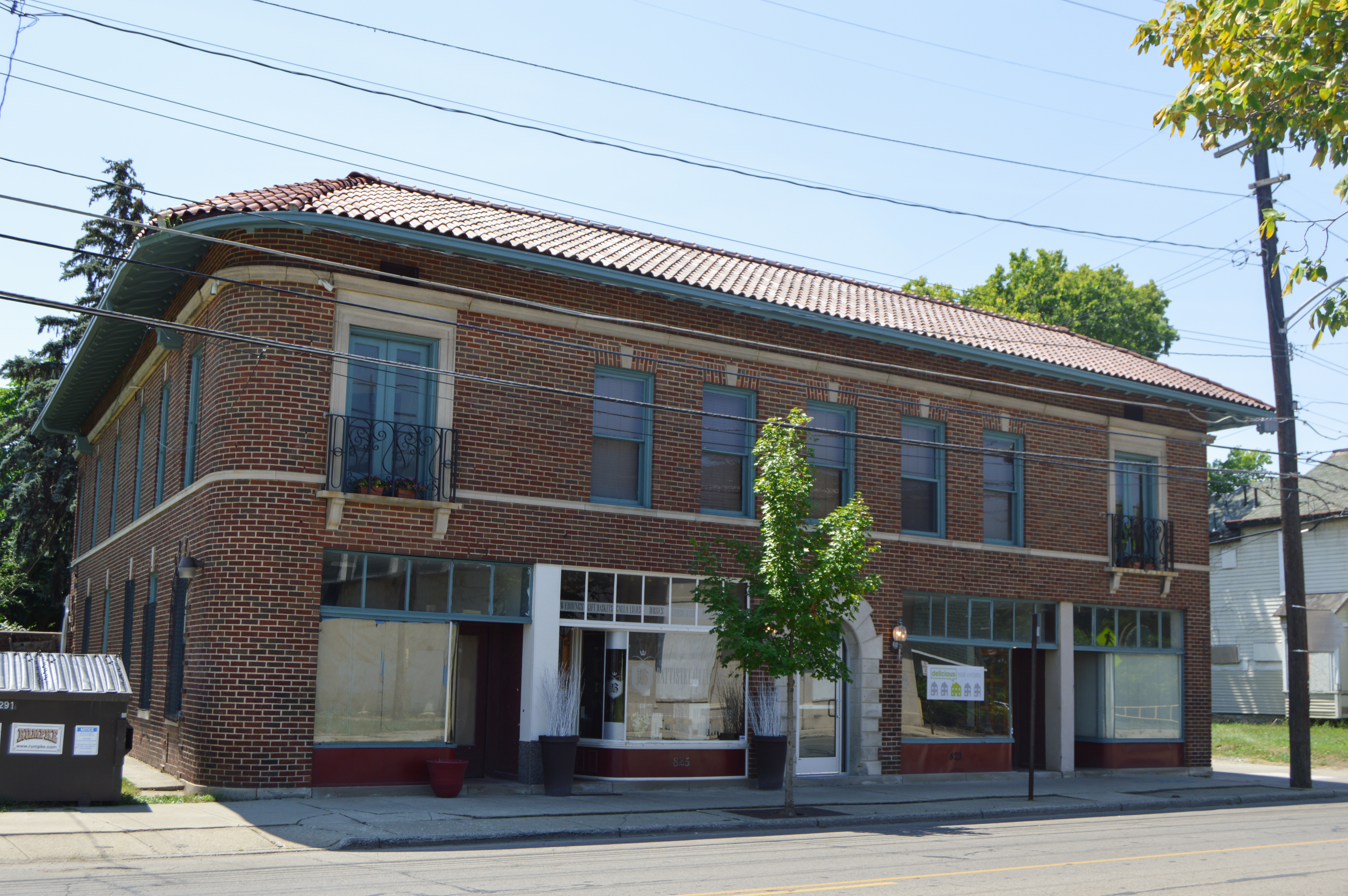
- Interactive map highlighting the building's location
- Location: 823 E. Long St., Columbus, Ohio
- Coordinates: 39.967304°N 82.979175°W
- Built: 1925
- Architect: George W. Abernethy
- Architectural style: Mission/Spanish Colonial Revival
- NRHP reference No.: 15000324
- Added to NRHP: June 8, 2015

The Theresa Building is a historic building in the King-Lincoln Bronzeville neighborhood of Columbus, Ohio. It was built in 1925 and was listed on the National Register of Historic Places in 2015.

The building is located on a commercial corridor on Long Street, east of Downtown Columbus. It was built by James Albert Jackson and James Williams. Jackson had noticed a shortage of office space for Black professionals alongside an increasing population as Blacks left the South during the Great Migration.

The two-story commercial structure was designed by George W. Abernethy in the Mission and Spanish Colonial Revival styles. It is made of brick with limestone trim, arched window frames and doorways, and an overhanging red Spanish tile roof.

== See also ==
- National Register of Historic Places listings in Columbus, Ohio
