= Jaeger Machine Company Office Building =

- U.S. National Register of Historic Places
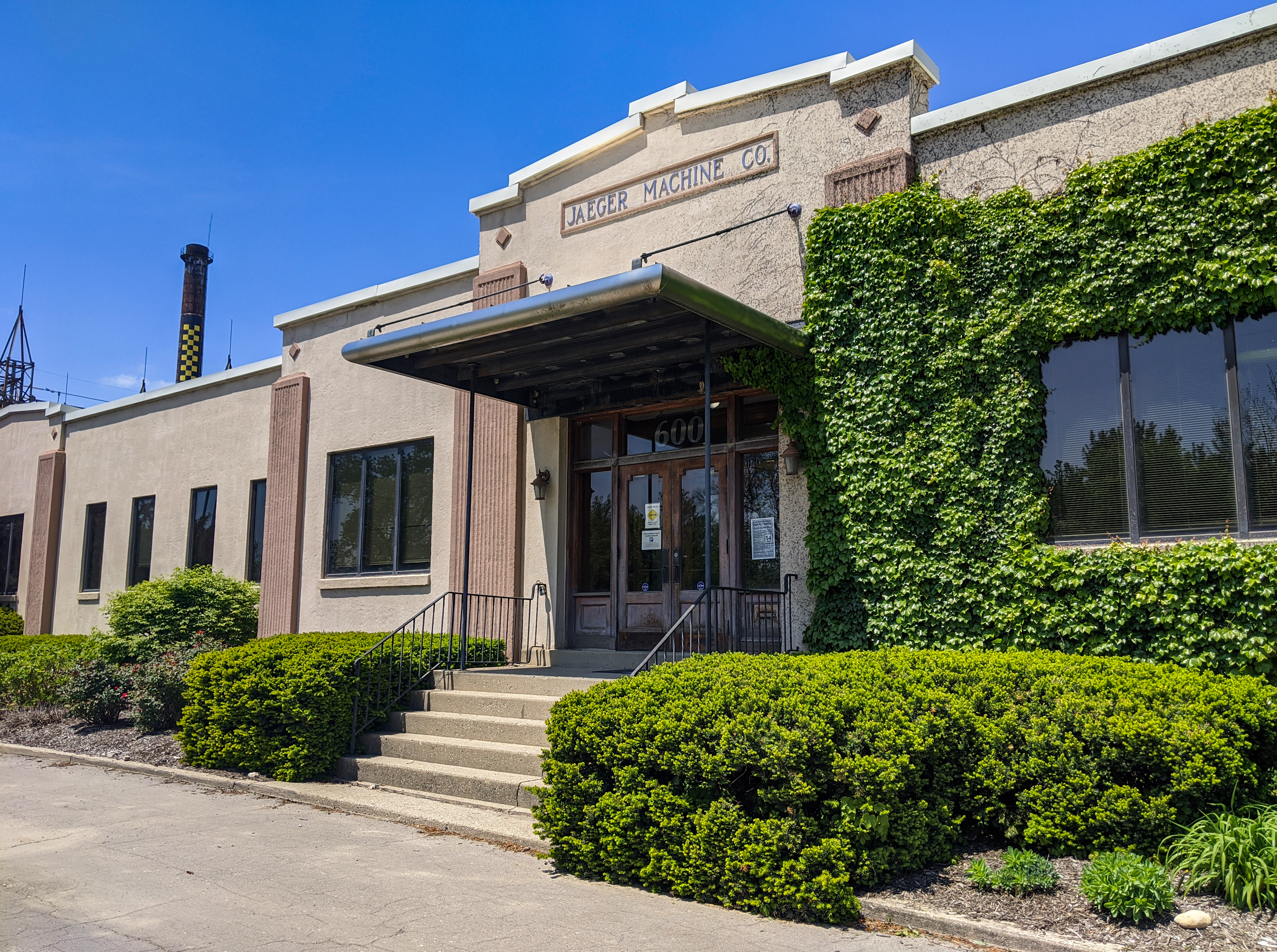
- Interactive map highlighting the building's location
- Location: 550 W. Spring St., Columbus, Ohio
- Coordinates: 39.966521°N 83.016524°W
- Built: 1936
- Architect: O. G. Mandt, Lyon Gardner
- Architectural style: Art Deco
- NRHP reference No.: 83001969
- Added to NRHP: June 16, 1983

The Jaeger Machine Company Office Building is a historic building in the Arena District neighborhood of Columbus, Ohio. It was listed on the National Register of Historic Places in 1983.

The two-story concrete building was constructed in 1936. It was designed simply and affordably, but with Art Deco features for a modern design. The design was by O. G. Mandt, company president, and Lyon Gardner, an engineer. The company was founded in 1906 and successfully produced cement mixers. It declined over time, finally shuttering in 1992.

The building stands as a rare example of the Art Deco movement for industrial buildings in Columbus.

== See also ==
- National Register of Historic Places listings in Columbus, Ohio
