= Felix A. Jacobs House =

Historic house in Ohio, United States

- U.S. National Register of Historic Places
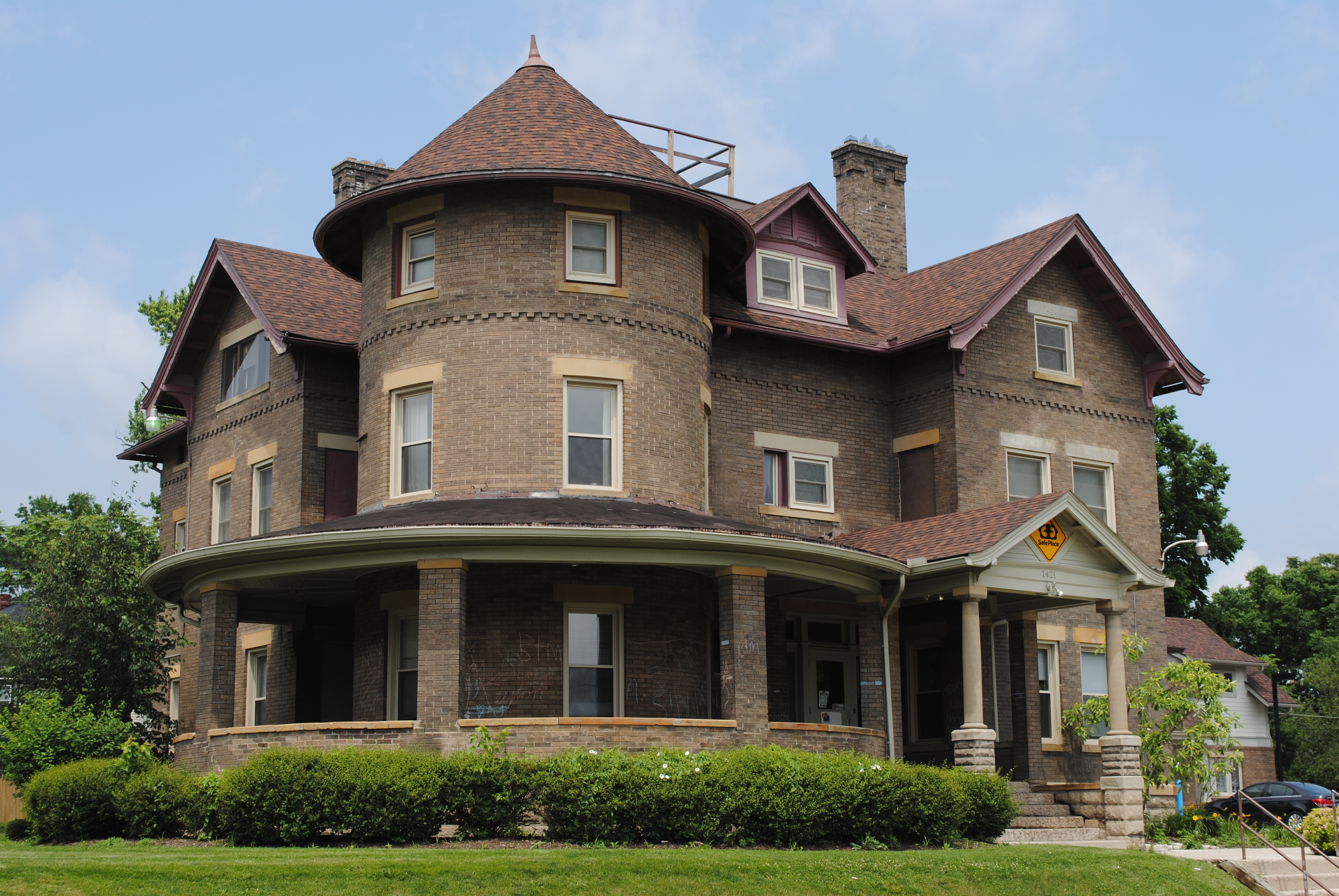
- Interactive map of Felix A. Jacobs House
- Location: 1421 Hamlet St., Columbus, Ohio
- Coordinates: 39.992014°N 83.000785°W
- Built: c. 1905-10
- NRHP reference No.: 86003434
- Added to NRHP: December 19, 1986

The Felix A. Jacobs House is a historic house in the Weinland Park neighborhood of Columbus, Ohio, United States. The house was built c. 1905-10 and was listed on the National Register of Historic Places in 1986.

The house is now known as the Huckleberry House, a shelter for youth. Within the house there are multiple different programs all for supporting youth with mental, emotional, and physical problems. It is a safe space for the troubled kids to come and stay (overnight if they want) and receive assistance.

== See also ==
- National Register of Historic Places listings in Columbus, Ohio
