= H.C. Godman Co. =

Shoe manufacturer in Columbus, Ohio

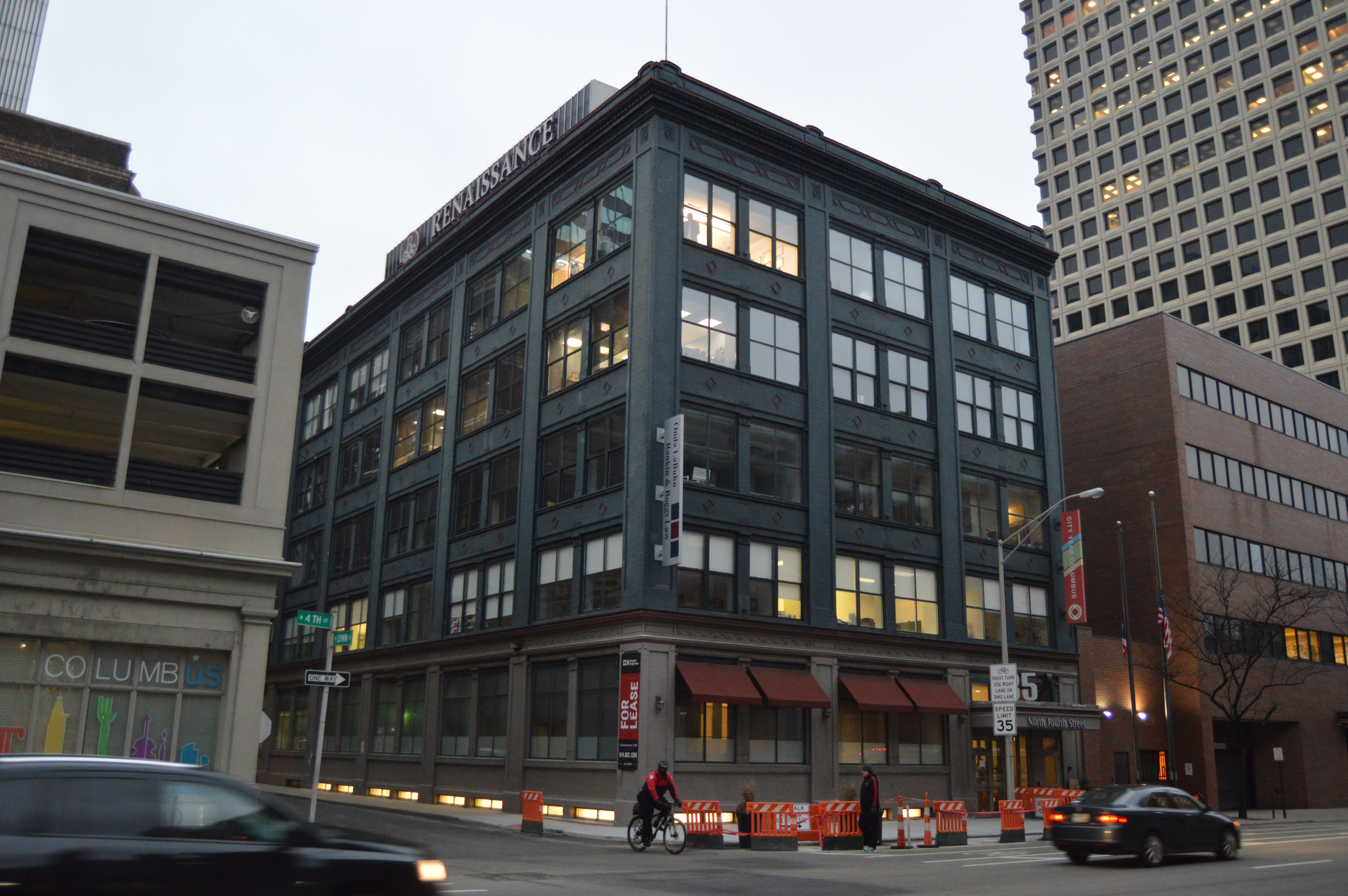
The H.C. Godman Co. Building

The H.C. Godman Company was a shoe manufacturer based in Columbus, Ohio. The manufacturer was the first of significance in the city, founded by Henry Clay Godman as Hodder and Godman Leather in 1876. It operated until 1962, only one of two local shoe manufacturers in Columbus to survive into the 1960s.

The company had its main factory at 347 W. Broad Street in the city's Franklinton neighborhood. At its height, it produced shoes in six locations around Columbus. The H.C. Godman Co. Building, located in Downtown Columbus, was listed on the National Register of Historic Places in 2018.
