= McClure-Nesbitt Motor Company =

Building in Columbus, Ohio

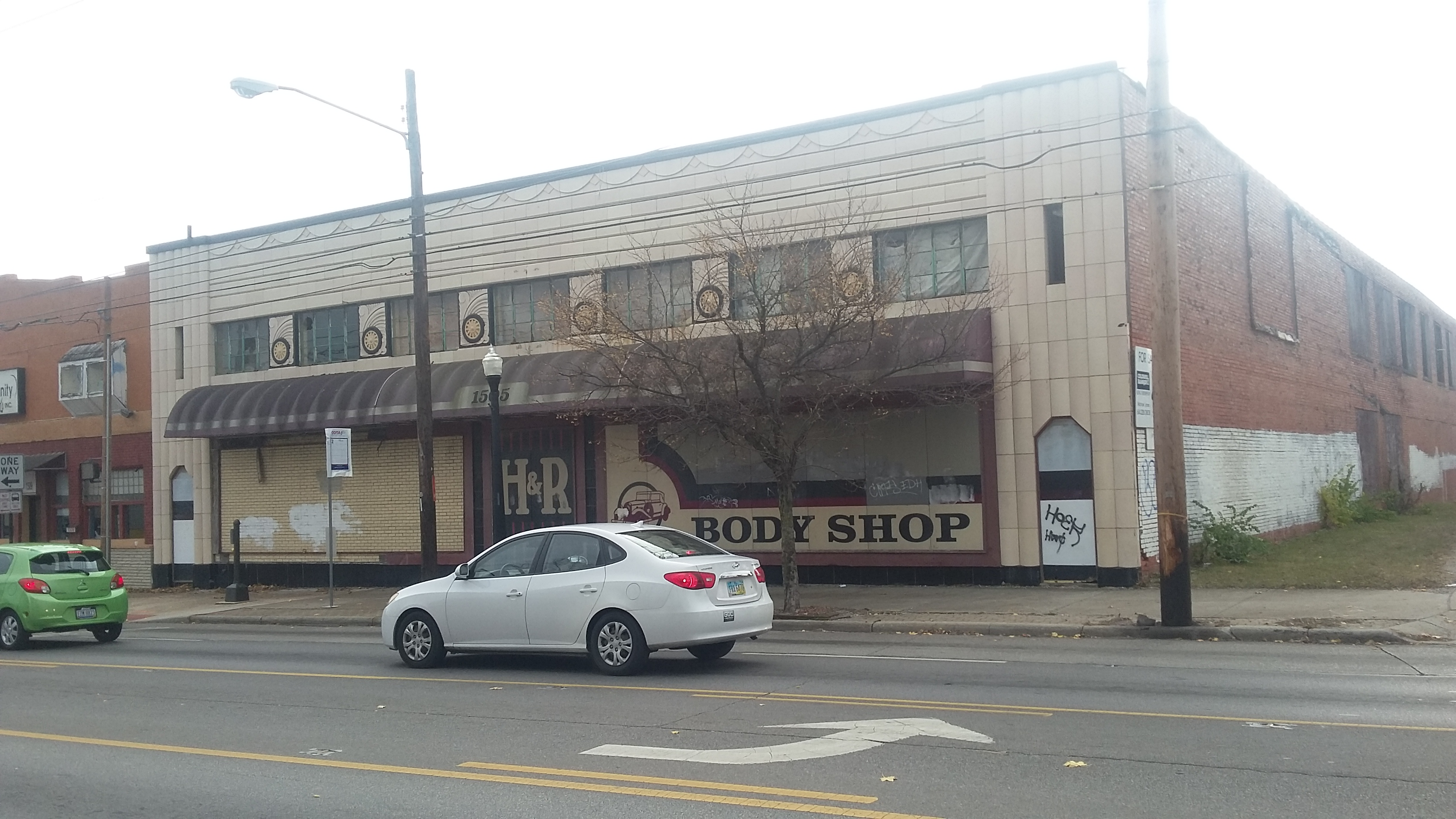
- Location: 1503-1507 E. Main Street, Columbus, Ohio
- Coordinates: 39.957318°N 82.958934°W
- Architect: Ray Sims
- Architectural style(s): Art Deco

Columbus Register of Historic Properties
- Designated: July 12, 2017
- Reference no.: CR-71

The McClure-Nesbitt Motor Company is a historic automobile dealership in the South of Main neighborhood of Columbus, Ohio. It was listed on the Columbus Register of Historic Properties in 2017, and was listed on the National Register of Historic Places in 2024.

The building, constructed in 1926, was designed in an elaborate Art Deco style by local architect Ray Sims. The McClure-Nesbitt Motor Company operated out of the building for the next four decades. The building became vacant in 1964, and cycled through ownerships, operating either as a dealership or car repair facility. In 2018, a nonprofit developer began converting the building to hold arts businesses and apartments.

== Attributes ==
The two-story, 28,000 sq ft (2,600 m^{2}) building was designed in the Art Deco style by Ray Sims, a local architect and member of the Columbus chapter of the AIA. Sims, an original partner to the present-day Schooley Caldwell, also designed the Richard Berry Jr. House in Columbus, and assisted in designing the Ohio State University's Sullivant Hall. The building has a concrete foundation, terra cotta and brick walls, and a flat roof. Its original structure faced both Main Street and Kelton Avenue. The Main Street facade, 9 bays wide, is faced with decorative beige glazed terra cotta. The building's first floor has a central double-width entrance beside large display windows (some now bricked in), with single half-hexagonal entrances at each end of the facade. The second story facade has a row of 12-pane steel casement windows, separated by Art Deco terra cotta ornamentation depicting an automobile tire. Other facades on the building utilize common brick and large windows and have no ornamentation.

== History ==
The McClure-Nesbitt Motor Company opened in 1926, operated by Ohio State University graduates J. A. McClure Jr. and Hugh E. Nesbitt. McClure, president and general manager, had operated a Fordson Tractor dealership at 311 Cleveland Avenue previously, while Nesbitt, vice president, owned multiple car dealerships in the area. At the time the dealership opened, it was part of the Main Street Commercial District, a prosperous area near Franklin Park, Bryden Road, and Woodland Park. The company initially sold Ford vehicles, while in the 1930s it sold Chevrolet cars, and in the late 1940s, it sold Chrysler and Plymouth cars. By 1961, the dealership was renamed to the McClure Main Motor Co. In 1964, it was listed as vacant, and the building began to change ownership. It cycled between uses as a car repair facility and as a dealership. Most recently, it held the H&R Body Shop.

As of 2018, a local nonprofit developer is working to convert its first floor to hold a theater, art gallery, music studio, and event space, with eleven apartments on the second floor. The new owner hopes the building can act as an incubator for small local businesses. As one of few early 20th century dealerships remaining in Columbus, in representing architect Ray Sims, and for its elaborate Art Deco architecture, the building was listed on the Columbus Register of Historic Properties in 2017.
