= Ohio Baptist General Association Headquarters =

- U.S. National Register of Historic Places
- Columbus Register of Historic Properties
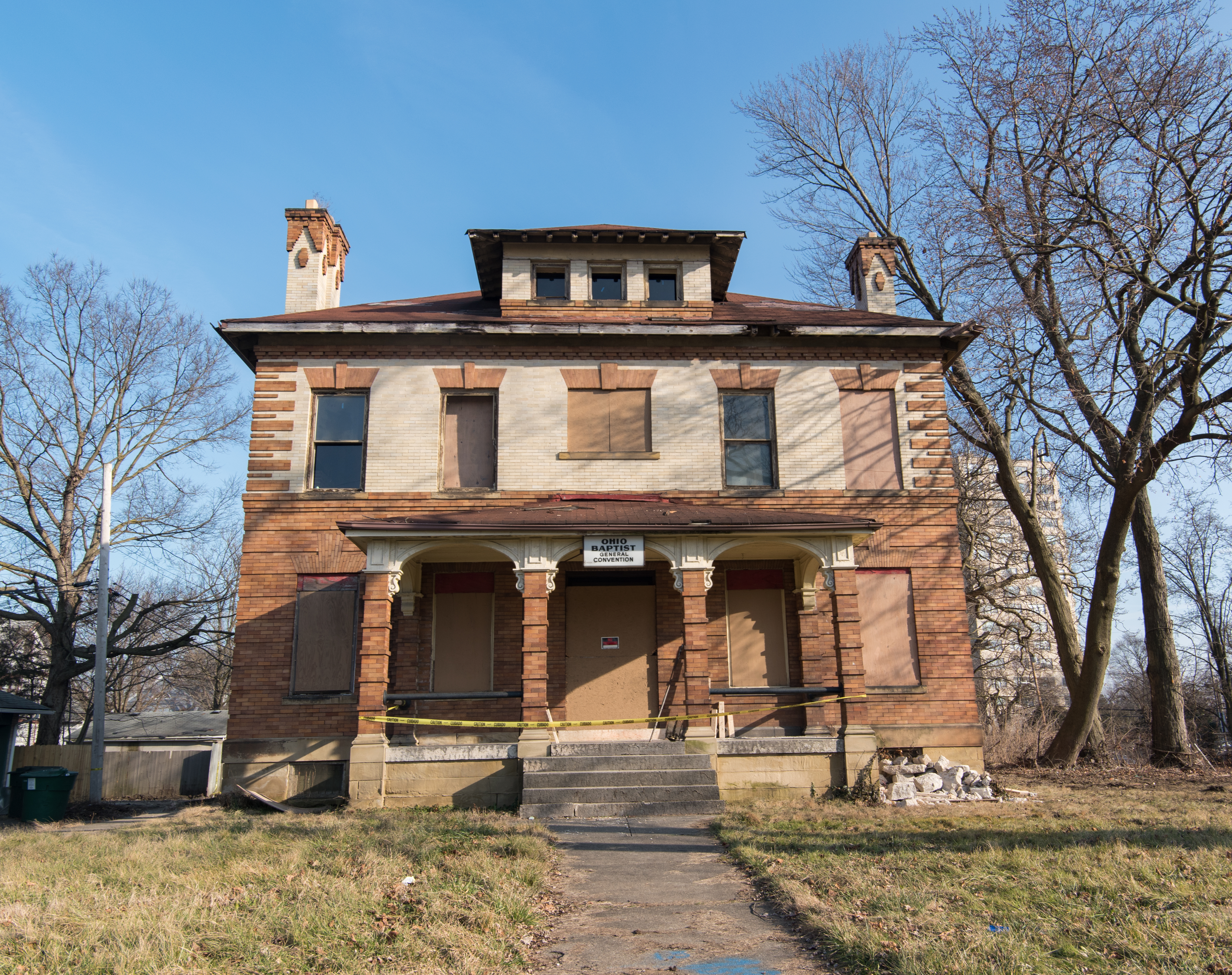
- Interactive map highlighting the building's location
- Location: 48 Parkwood Ave., Columbus, Ohio
- Coordinates: 39.968068°N 82.959537°W
- Built: 1904-05
- NRHP reference No.: 100005845
- CRHP No.: CR-78

Significant dates
- Added to NRHP: December 3, 2020
- Designated CRHP: July 31, 2019

The Ohio Baptist General Association Headquarters is a historic building in the Woodland Park neighborhood of Columbus, Ohio. It was listed on the Columbus Register of Historic Properties in 2019 and the National Register of Historic Places in 2020. The house was built for Jerimiah Foley from 1904 to 1905. It remained residential until 1954, when the Ohio Baptist General Association (OBGA) purchased it to act as its headquarters. The association dedicated the building in October 1957, and fully converted it to offices by 1958. The OBGA ceased operations in the building in 1996, and is partnering in a restoration effort to preserve its historic features. The building, listed on the 2018 Columbus Landmarks' "Most Endangered" register, is planned to gain residential units as well as return to acting as the organization's headquarters.

The Ohio Baptist General Association first moved into the neighboring 32 Parkwood Avenue in 1954. The building, an American Foursquare with bungalow elements, was constructed c. 1910. The association later acquired 40 Parkwood Avenue, a Midwest Modern brick apartment building constructed in 1963. Both neighboring buildings were likewise marked on Columbus Landmarks' 2018 endangered properties list, but were demolished c. 2019–20.

== See also ==
- National Register of Historic Places listings in Columbus, Ohio
