= East North Broadway Historic District =

Historic district in Ohio, United States

- U.S. National Register of Historic Places
- U.S. Historic district
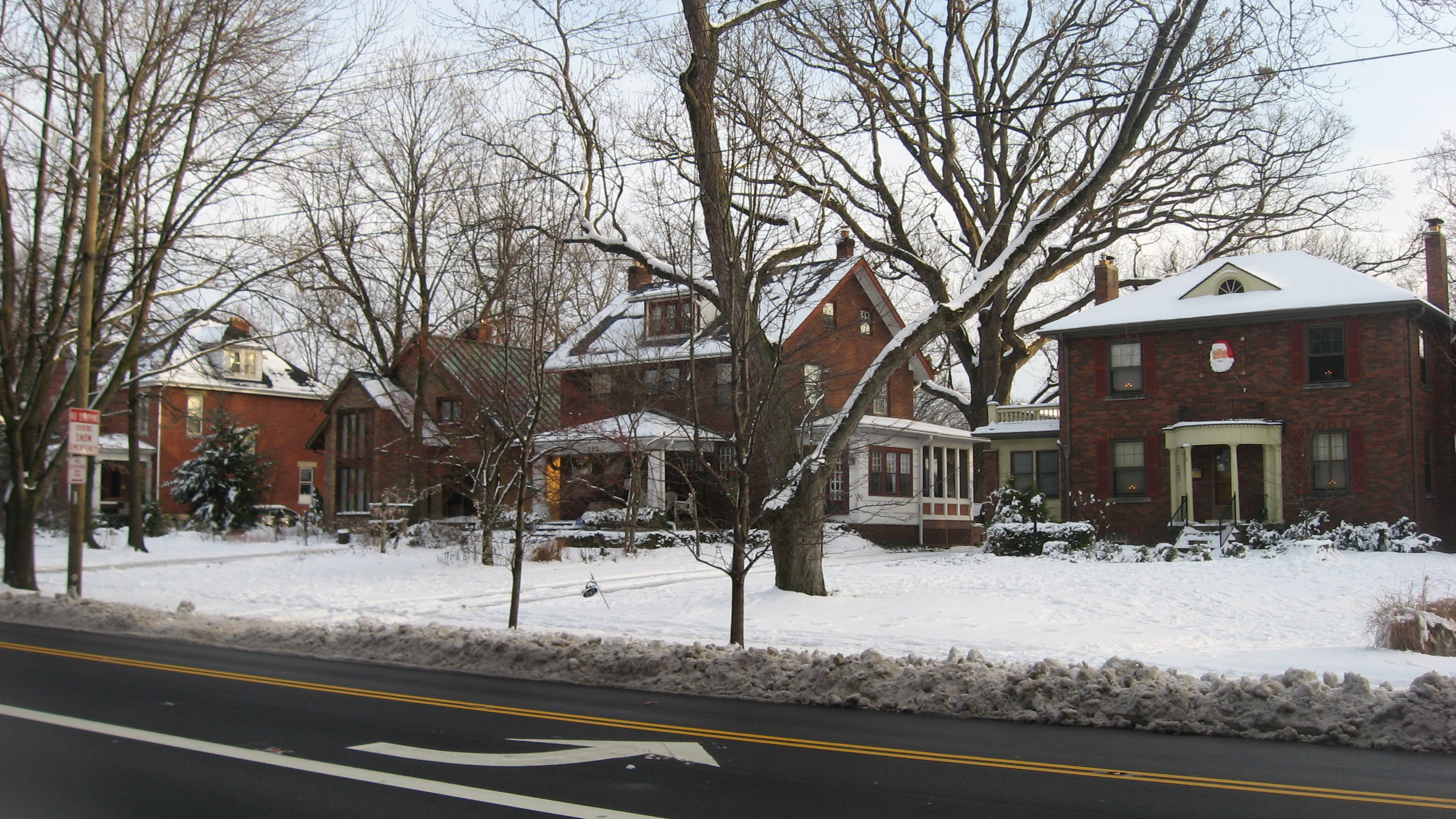
- Interactive map
- Location: E. North Broadway roughly between Broadway Place and N. Broadway Lane, Columbus, Ohio
- Coordinates: 40.031389°N 83.006944°W
- Architect: Sims, Ray, et al.
- Architectural style: Queen Anne, late 19th and 20th century revivals
- NRHP reference No.: 10000454
- Added to NRHP: July 8, 2010

The East North Broadway Historic District is a historic district in Clintonville, Columbus, Ohio. It was listed on the National Register of Historic Places in 2010. The linear district spans the east and north sides of East North Broadway, encompassing 117 primary and 86 secondary buildings, mostly garages and outbuildings. Most of the contributing structures are single-family houses, though there is an office building, school, and two churches. There is a diverse array of architecture styles represented, including Queen Anne, Colonial Revival, English Revival, Dutch Colonial Revival, Georgian Revival, Romanesque Revival, Craftsman, Bungalow, and mid-century modern.

It includes the Richard Berry Jr. House which is separately listed on the NRHP.

== See also ==
- National Register of Historic Places listings in Columbus, Ohio
