= Ohio Moline Plow Building =

- Ohio Moline Plow Company Building
- U.S. National Register of Historic Places
- Columbus Register of Historic Properties
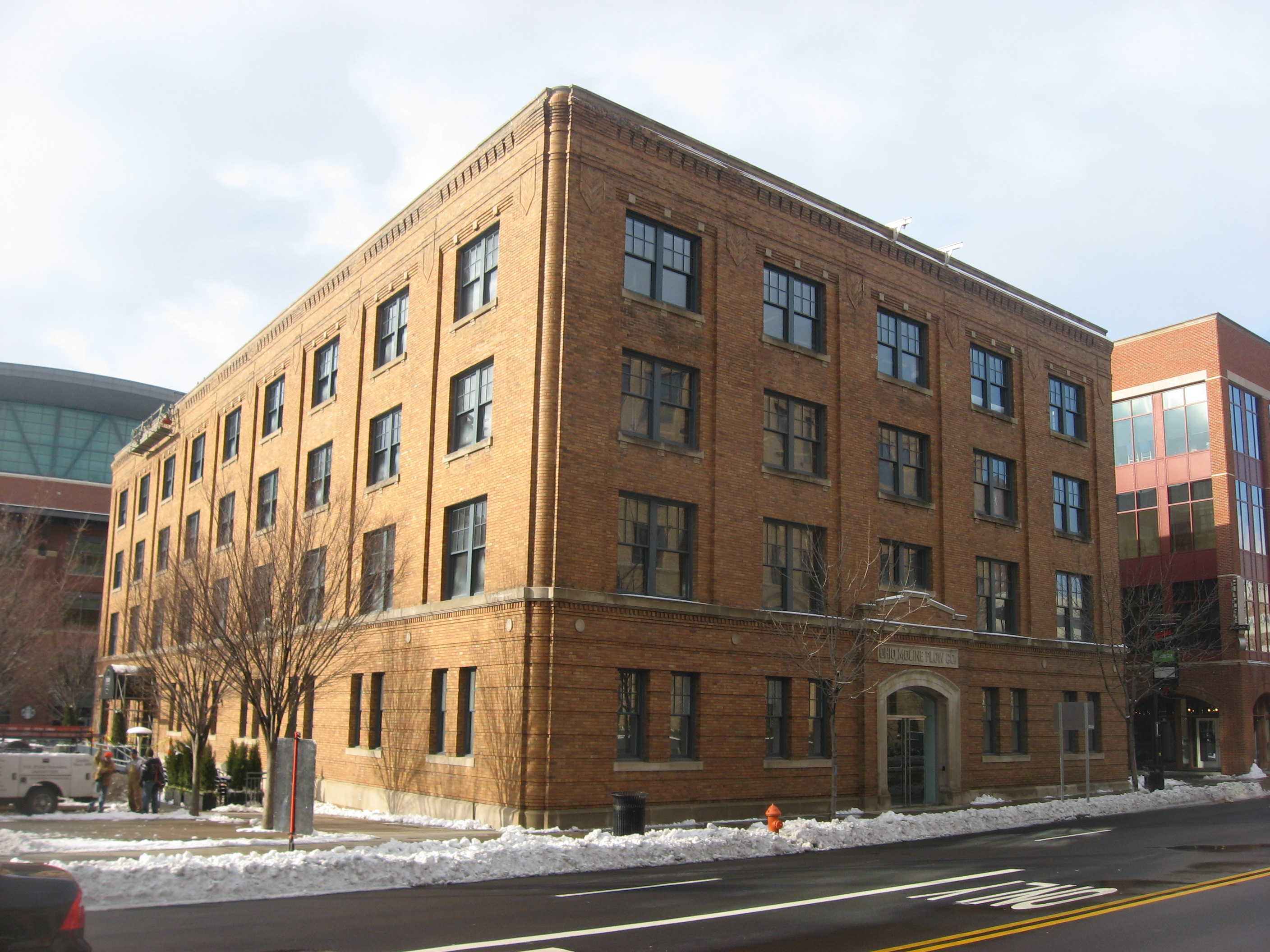
- Interactive map highlighting the building's location
- Location: 343 N. Front Street, Columbus, Ohio
- Coordinates: 39.969316°N 83.004274°W
- Built: 1913
- NRHP reference No.: 99000701
- CRHP No.: CR-53

Significant dates
- Added to NRHP: June 10, 1999
- Designated CRHP: December 16, 1997

The Ohio Moline Plow Building is a historic building in the Arena District in Downtown Columbus, Ohio. It was listed on the National Register of Historic Places in 1999. The building was built in 1913 as an office, warehouse, and sales space for the Ohio Moline Plow Company, part of the Moline Plow Company based in Illinois. It is located in a former warehouse district, which once held numerous buildings of similar size, scale, and materials. In the late 20th century, most of the buildings were demolished. The building is also significant for its design integrity and materials, with original patterned brickwork and stone trim, and glass and wood office partitioning.

== See also ==
- National Register of Historic Places listings in Columbus, Ohio
