= Lubal Manufacturing & Distributing Company =

Historic building in Columbus, Ohio

- Lubal Manufacturing and Distributing Company
- U.S. National Register of Historic Places
- Columbus Register of Historic Properties
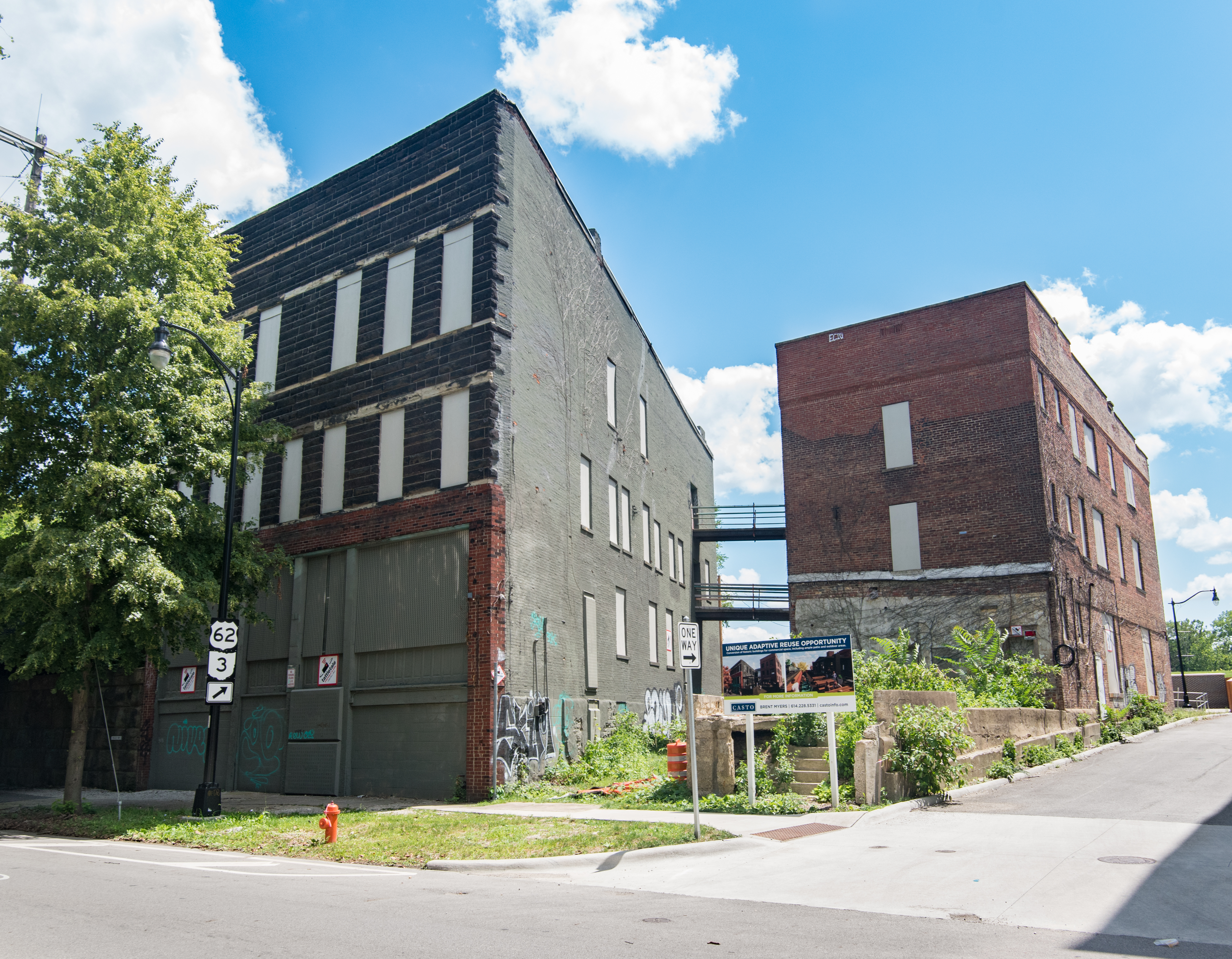
- Location: 373-375 W. Rich St., Columbus, Ohio
- Coordinates: 39.956102°N 83.009713°W
- NRHP reference No.: 16000459
- CRHP No.: CR-68

Significant dates
- Added to NRHP: July 19, 2016
- Designated CRHP: September 21, 2015

The Lubal Manufacturing & Distributing Company buildings are a set of two industrial buildings in the Franklinton neighborhood of Columbus, Ohio. The site was listed on the Columbus Register of Historic Properties in 2015 and the National Register of Historic Places in 2016. The buildings include 373 West Rich Street, built c. 1900, and 375 West Rich Street, built c. 1911. With much of the original materials intact, the buildings are few remaining that demonstrate Franklinton's early industrial and commercial history.

== See also ==
- National Register of Historic Places listings in Columbus, Ohio
