= Ford Motor Company - Columbus Assembly Plant =

Building in Columbus, Ohio

- U.S. National Register of Historic Places
- Columbus Register of Historic Properties
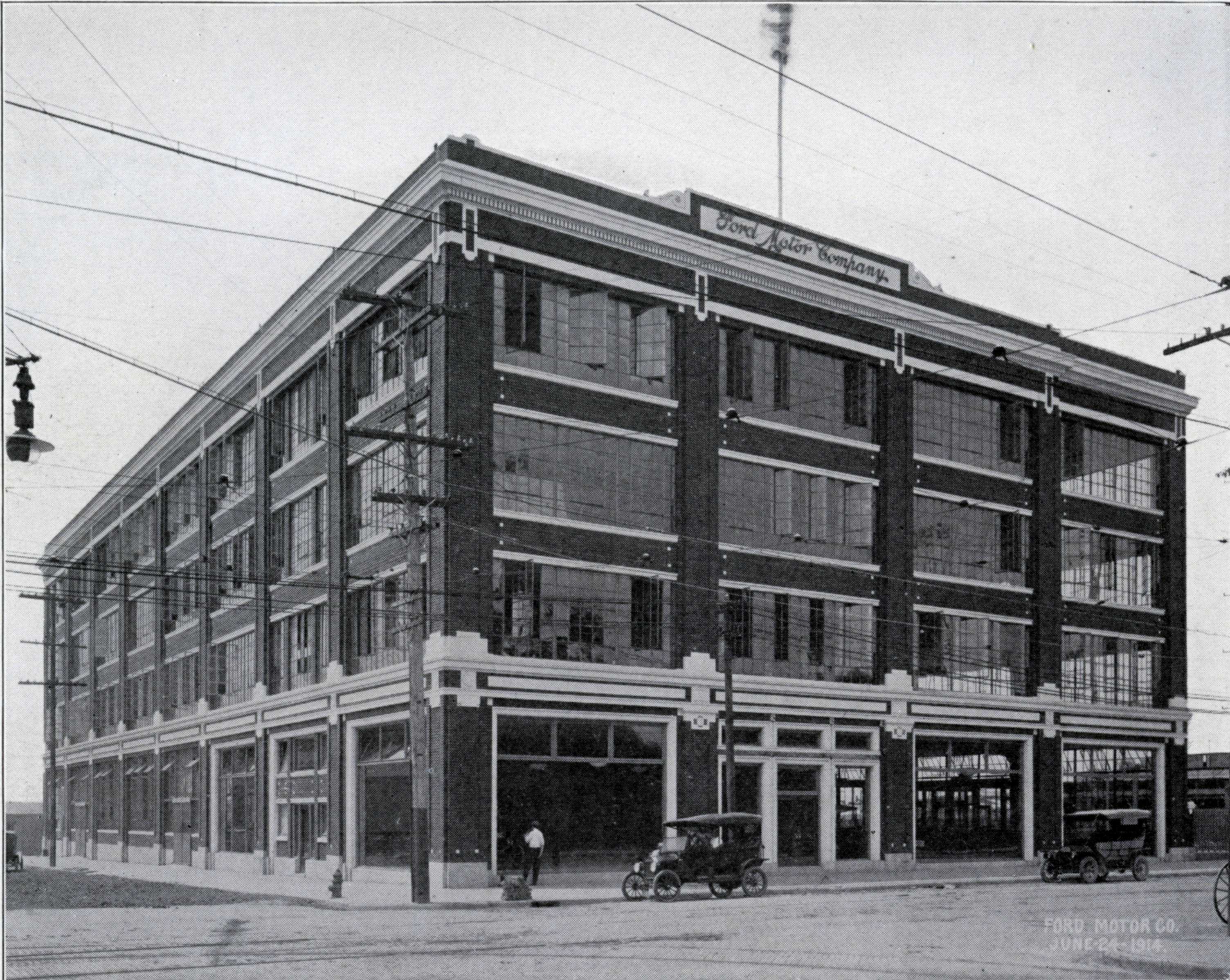
- The building in 1915
- Location: 427 Cleveland Avenue, Columbus, Ohio
- Coordinates: 39.972726°N 82.991061°W
- Built: 1914
- Architect: John Graham
- Architectural style: Commercial
- NRHP reference No.: 100006229
- CRHP No.: CR-80

Significant dates
- Added to NRHP: March 15, 2021
- Designated CRHP: March 11, 2021

The Ford Motor Company - Columbus Assembly Plant is a historic building in Downtown Columbus, Ohio. The Ford plant was constructed in 1914, to designs by John Graham. The plant operated until 1939. In later years, it became the Kroger Co. Columbus Bakery, operating until 2019. The building was sold in 2020, and is planned to be redeveloped into a large residential complex, announced in 2021. The building was added to the National Register of Historic Places and Columbus Register of Historic Properties in 2021.

The former Ford plant sits on a 9.5-acre (3.8 ha) site along with 457 Cleveland Avenue to its north, built in 1927 as a Kroger bakery. Together the buildings total 375,000 sq ft (34,800 m^{2}).

== History ==
=== Background ===
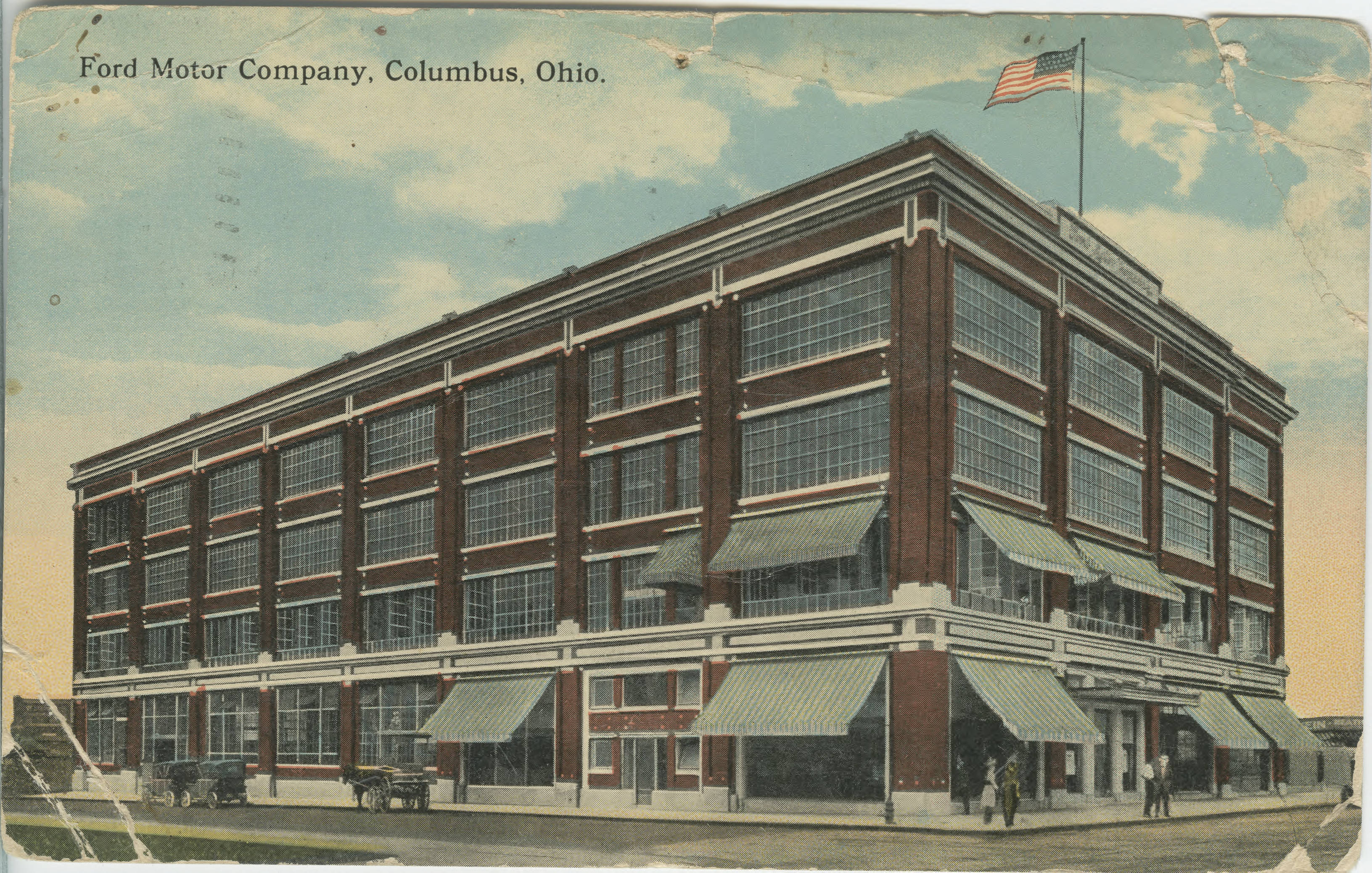
The building c. 1916

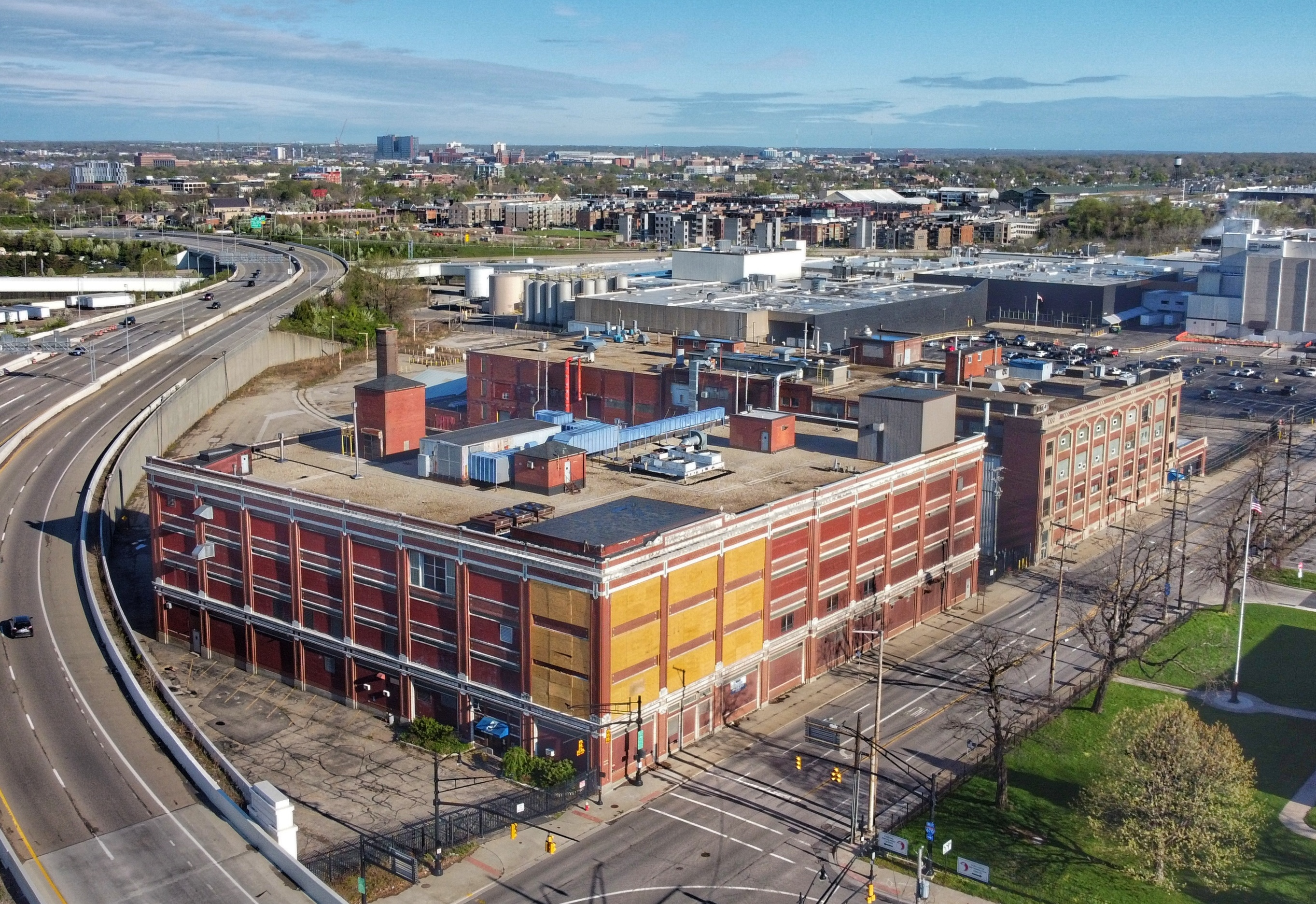
The building (foreground) and former bakery (background) before planned renovation, 2021

Ford Motor Company relied on a network of sales agencies-dealers which agreed to sell Model T cars, stock parts, and provide mechanics' services. Ford initially manufactured fully assembled cars in Detroit and then "knocked them down" (took off the wheels and otherwise prepared them for shipment) and shipped them to dealers. The agents in distant cities reassembled the knocked-down cars before sale. To better serve the network of sales dealerships. Ford took direct control of agencies in New York and Philadelphia in 1905 and the following year established company-owned branches in Boston, Buffalo, Cleveland, Chicago, St. Louis, and Kansas City, initially in leased buildings. Ford branches also sold Ford cars in addition to assembling vehicles for delivery to dealerships. Ford sold over 200,000 autos in 1914, with 80 percent of sales originating from the company's twenty-nine branches. As Ford sales continued to increase, the company built additional branch assembly plants in company-owned buildings, most of which were designed by Architect Albert Kahn.

The Ford system of branch plants was so successful that the company's competitors soon adopted the practice. Chevrolet, for example, established four branch assembly plants in 1915-1916 throughout the United States. Ford Branch Assembly Plants were located in Atlanta, Buffalo, Cambridge, Chicago, Cincinnati, Cleveland, Columbus, Dallas, Denver, Detroit, Fargo, Houston, Indianapolis, Kansas City, Long Island City, Los Angeles, Louisville, Memphis, Milwaukee, Minneapolis, Oklahoma City, Omaha, Philadelphia, Pittsburgh, Portland, Ore., San Francisco, Seattle and St. Louis.

=== Building history ===
The structure was built in 1914 and designed by John Graham & Company. John Graham was a Seattle architect working in the Ford architecture department in Highland Park, Michigan. Graham was the designer of several branch plants, including plants in Seattle, Cambridge, Houston, Dallas, Columbus, Cincinnati, Atlanta, and Pittsburgh. Architect Albert Kahn was responsible for nearly all of the remaining 1920s generation of branch assembly plants. As a branch assembly plant of the Ford Motor Company, beginning in 1914 the Columbus plant assembled the Ford Model T automobile. The plant processed components that arrived by train. The automobiles were assembled at the plant for delivery to local dealers. The shipping boxes were sized so that the wood from the empty boxes could be used as floorboards for the automobiles. The plant was closed in 1939.

The building housed the Kroger Co. Columbus Bakery until 2019. It was purchased by developers in March 2020 for $8.15 million. In April 2021, plans were unveiled for a 448-unit residential complex on the site, renovating the two existing buildings while adding three more. The development would be primarily residential, though a portion is set to hold restaurant space. Parking is predominantly set for within residential buildings; 420 of 599 proposed spaces. Large portions of the site will be landscaped into park space, a pool, dog park, and athletic courts.

The building was added to the National Register of Historic Places and Columbus Register of Historic Properties in 2021.

== See also ==
- List of Ford factories
- National Register of Historic Places listings in Columbus, Ohio
