= Iuka Ravine Historic District =

Historic district in Ohio, United States

- U.S. National Register of Historic Places
- U.S. Historic district
- Columbus Register of Historic Properties
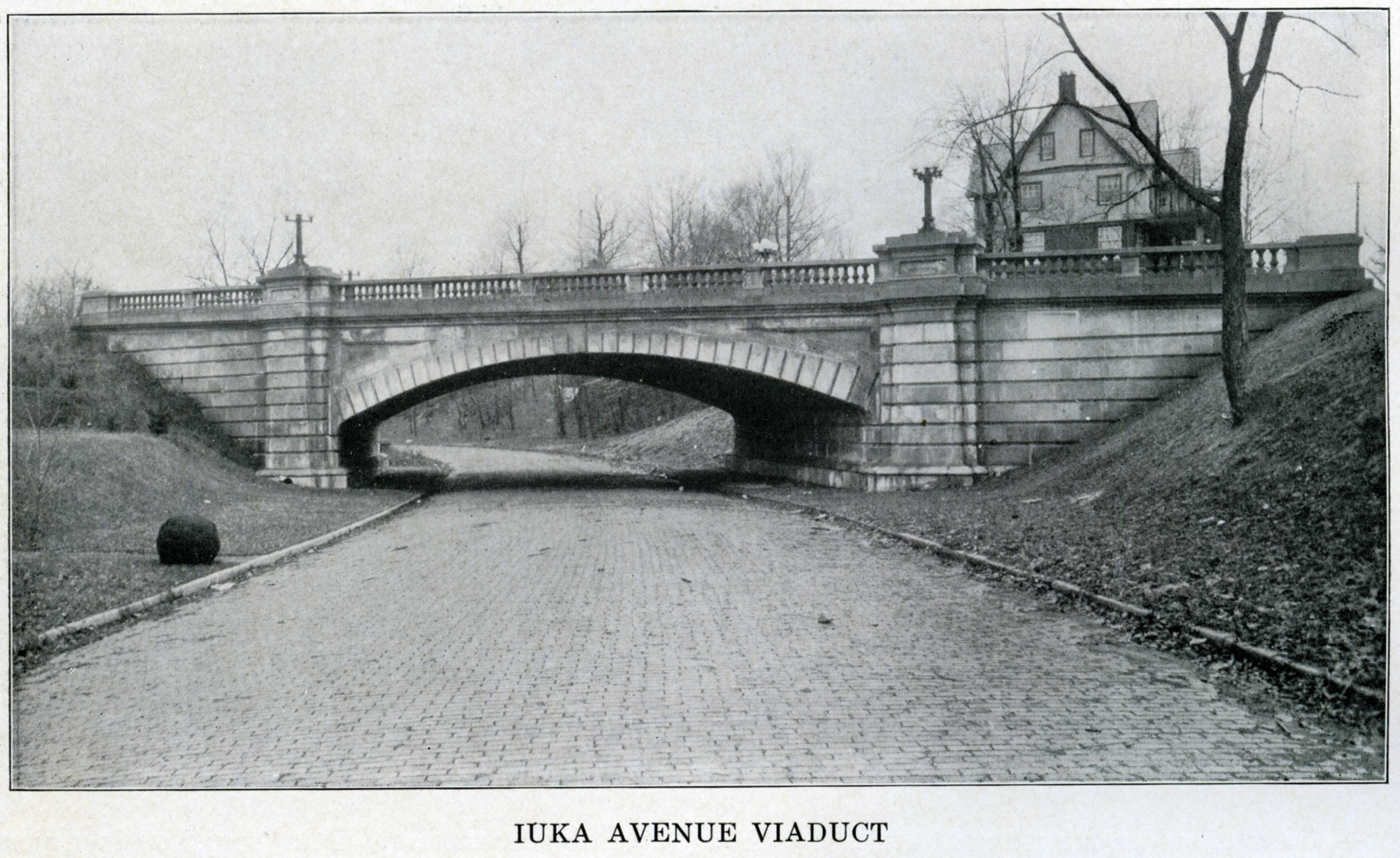
- The Indianola Avenue Bridge, a contributing structure, 1916
- Interactive map highlighting the district among other historic sites
- Location: Roughly bounded by E. Lane and E. Northwood., N. 4th, 20th and E. 19th, and Indianola Aves., Columbus, Ohio
- Coordinates: 40.005°N 83.002667°W
- NRHP reference No.: 86001023
- CRHP No.: CR-39

Significant dates
- Added to NRHP: May 8, 1986
- Designated CRHP: August 1, 1985

The Iuka Ravine Historic District is a historic district in the University District of Columbus, Ohio. The site was listed on the Columbus Register of Historic Properties in 1985 and the National Register of Historic Places in 1986. The district has approximately 50 houses and apartment buildings, most located on the edge of the wooded Iuka Ravine. The houses are mostly craftsman and early 20th century revival styles, with noted Columbus architects Frank Packard and Charles Inscho represented. The district was the first development in the city to take advantage of its natural landscape, setting an example for other early 20th century developments around Columbus.

== See also ==
- National Register of Historic Places listings in Columbus, Ohio
