= Weisheimer House =

Fire station in Columbus, Ohio

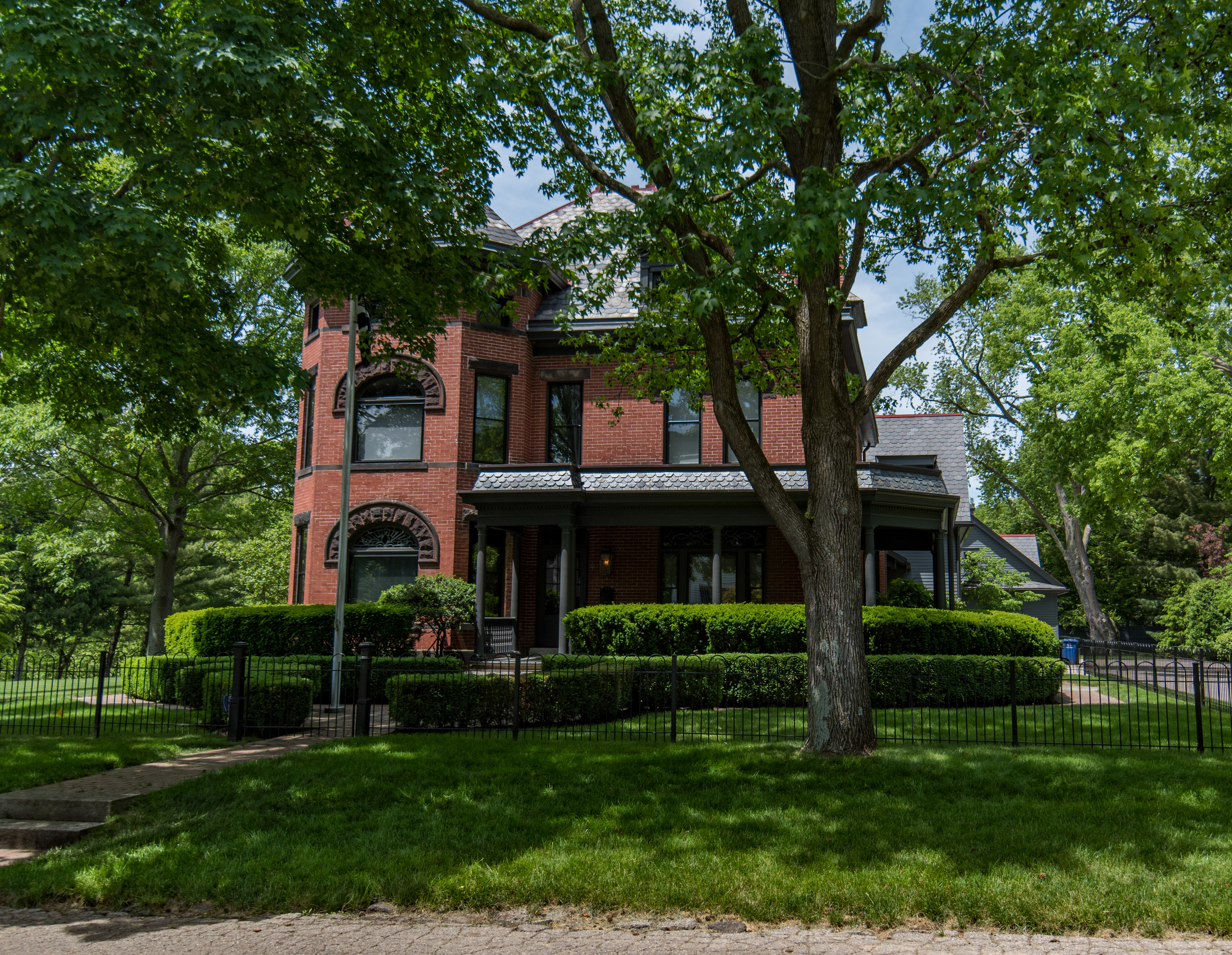
- Location: 286 W. Weisheimer Road, Columbus, Ohio
- Coordinates: 40.055564°N 83.027701°W
- Built: 1890s
- Architectural style(s): Richardsonian Romanesque

Columbus Register of Historic Properties
- Designated: June 14, 1982
- Reference no.: CR-8

The Weisheimer House is a historic house in the Clintonville neighborhood of Columbus, Ohio. It was built in the 1890s for Jacob Weisheimer, a German immigrant who operated a mill nearby. The house has stayed a single family residence since then, with Robert W. Teater, a former Ohio Department of Natural Resources director, as the primary owner from 1965 to 2007. The house was listed on the Columbus Register of Historic Properties in 1982.

== Attributes ==
The Weisheimer House is made of brick and has 3,400 sq ft (320 m^{2}). It has a Richardsonian Romanesque design, with masonry details, arched windows, and an octagonal tower on the southwest corner. The design is simplified from many Richardsonian buildings, lacking heavy stonework or detailed ornamentation typical of the style. The house's windows have stone lintels and sills. The house has seven fireplaces with oak mantels, several leaded and stained-glass windows, a slate roof, and a wraparound wooden porch.

The house stands alone among 1950s ranch, Cape Cod, and split-level houses; it was noted by the Columbus Dispatch as a house more typical of Victorian Village. It is on a 2-acre (0.81 ha) plot by the Olentangy River and on the western end of Weisheimer Road, named for the original owner.

The building contains two stories, an attic, and a basement. The first floor has a kitchen, parlor, dining room, den, office, and half-bath. The second includes four large bedrooms and two full bathrooms. The basement contains another full bathroom and a finished laundry room. The attic is large, with a maximum ceiling height of almost 20 ft (6.1 m). The ballroom-sized attic was suitably sized that sons of prior owners (from 1965 to 2007) played basketball inside.

== History ==
The house was built in the 1890s; the most frequently-cited build dates are 1891 and 1897. Jacob Weisheimer built it alongside the Olentangy River. The German immigrant ran a mill on the river bank by the house, constructed c. 1865.

Robert W. and Dorothy Teater owned the house from 1965 to 2007. Robert was a prominent owner over that period, as well as the director of the Ohio Department of Natural Resources, making residents know it as "the Teater house". The house was listed on the Columbus Register of Historic Properties in 1982. In 2007, the house was sold to another family, who owned it until 2013.
