= United States Carriage Company =

- U.S. National Register of Historic Places
- Columbus Register of Historic Properties
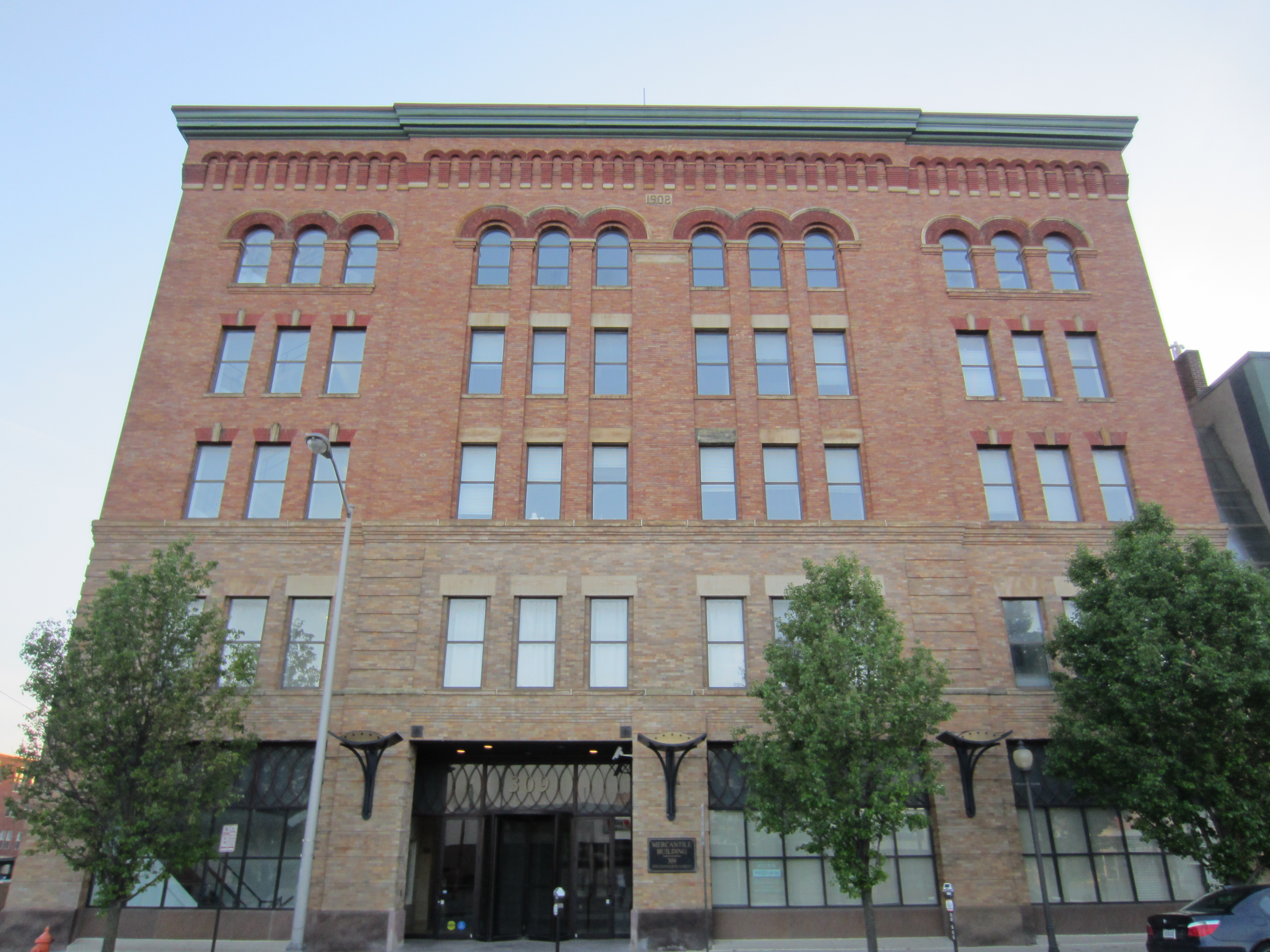
- Interactive map highlighting the building's location
- Location: 309-319 S. Fourth St., Columbus, Ohio
- Coordinates: 39.956111°N 82.995278°W
- Built: 1902
- NRHP reference No.: 15000325
- CRHP No.: CR-65

Significant dates
- Added to NRHP: June 8, 2015
- Designated CRHP: September 29, 2014

The United States Carriage Company (also known as the Mercantile Building) is a historic building in Downtown Columbus, Ohio. It was listed on the Columbus Register of Historic Properties in 2014 and the National Register of Historic Places in 2015.

== See also ==
- National Register of Historic Places listings in Columbus, Ohio
