= Columbus Register of Historic Properties =

Local list of historic sites in Columbus, Ohio

The Columbus Register of Historic Properties is a register for historic buildings and other sites in Columbus, Ohio, United States. The register is maintained by the City of Columbus Historic Resources Commission and Historic Preservation Office, and was established in 1980. Many of these landmarks are also listed on the National Register of Historic Places, providing federal tax support for preservation, and some are further designated National Historic Landmarks, providing additional federal oversight.

The Columbus Register includes 82 entries, including 54 on the National Register. Two of the city's three National Historic Landmarks are on the register: the Ohio Statehouse and Captain Edward V. Rickenbacker House, but not the Ohio Theatre. The city also maintains four historic districts not listed on its register: German Village, Italian Village, Victorian Village, and the Brewery District.

== Attributes ==
=== Criteria ===
Interactive map of the register's properties and districts

The Columbus Register of Historic Properties is the City of Columbus's official list of significant buildings, sites, and districts. Its entries must be at least 40 years old, and meet at least one of the following instances:

- Have a design or style with historical, architectural, or cultural significance to the city, state, or country
- Be closely and publicly identified with a person of historical, architectural, or cultural significance to the city, state, or country
- Be a significant work of an architect, engineer, landscape architect, or builder, whose works have influenced the city, state, or nation
- Demonstrate workmanship in design, detail, or material uses
- Be closely and publicly identified with event(s) of historical, architectural, or cultural significance to the city, state, or country

=== Agencies ===
The Columbus Historic Preservation Office, part of the Department of Development, helps owners preserve their buildings, answering questions and guiding applicants through the Certificate of Appropriateness process. The office reviews the applications before adding them to the Historic Resources Commission agenda. The office is also responsible for general preservation planning.

The Historic Resources Commission is a committee appointed by the mayor for three-year terms, without compensation, meeting once per month. The board generally consists of architects, lawyers, historic preservation professionals, realtors, contractors, business owners, and historic property owners. The committee preserves and improves the sites on the register, promotes historic preservation, encourages reinvestment in historic buildings, studies problems and needs in furthering preservation, and reviews rezoning, special permit, and variance requests, making recommendations for approval.

=== Effects ===
Listing on the Columbus Register protects properties and neighborhoods from changes to an area's historic or architectural nature. Owners are offered restoration advice from the staff of the Columbus Historic Preservation Office and the Historic Resources Commission.

Any site listed on the register is not required to undergo specific changes or improvements, though any exterior work requires a Certificates of Appropriateness from the Columbus Historic Preservation Office. When owners propose zoning changes, variants, or request special permits, the Historic Resources Commission reviews the proposal and makes a recommendation before passing it onto the zoning board or city council.

== List of historic properties ==
For consistency, the list below uses the name used on the Columbus Register of Historic Properties.

Roster number	Listing name	Image	Address	Ordinance number	Date listed	NRHP-listed	Date listed	Notes
CR-1	Krumm Residence		975-979 S. High Street	220–82	February 8, 1982	Yes, #82003568	September 30, 1982	
CR-2	Old State Arsenal	More images	139 W. Main Street	221–82	February 8, 1982	Yes, #74001495	July 18, 1974	Now known as the Cultural Arts Center
CR-3	Federal Post Office & Courthouse	More images	121 E. State Street (now 100 S. 3rd St.)	694–82	April 12, 1982	Yes, #73001441	April 11, 1973	
CR-4	First Congregational Church	More images	444 E. Broad Street	846–82	May 10, 1982	Yes, #100007182	November 29, 2021	
CR-5	Central Presbyterian Church	More images	132 S. Third Street	1005–82	June 7, 1982	Yes, #8300197	January 11, 1983	Now known as Second Presbyterian Church
CR-6	Trinity Episcopal Church	More images	125 E. Broad Street	1081–82	June 14, 1982	Yes, #76001427	November 13, 1976	
CR-7	St. Joseph Cathedral	More images	212 E. Broad Street	1082–82	June 14, 1982	No	N/A	
CR-8	Weisheimer House		286 W. Weisheimer Road	1083–82	June 14, 1982	No	N/A	
CR-9	LeVeque Tower	More images	50 W. Broad Street	1293–82	July 12, 1982	Yes, #75001398	March 21, 1975	Formerly known as the American Insurance Union Citadel
CR-10	Southern Hotel & Theatre	More images	310 S. High Street	1294–82	July 12, 1982	Yes, #82001458	October 2, 1982	
CR-11	East Town Street Historic District	More images	Bounded by Oak, Grant, Lester and Cherry	1837–82	October 4, 1982	Yes, boundaries differ, #76001425	July 30, 1976	
CR-12	First Avenue School	More images	929 Harrison Avenue	9-83	January 10, 1983	No	N/A	
CR-13	Ohio Statehouse	More images	1 Capitol Square	2143–82	November 15, 1982	Yes, #72001011	July 31, 1972	
CR-14	James Thurber House	More images	77 Jefferson Avenue	10–83	January 10, 1983	Yes, #79001840	November 8, 1979	
CR-15	Schlee-Kemmler Building	More images	326 S. High Street	7-83	January 10, 1983	Yes, #82001461	December 2, 1982	
CR-16	Macon Hotel		366 N. Twentieth Street	8-83	January 10, 1983	No	N/A	
CR-17	Orton Memorial Laboratory	More images	1445 Summit Street	634–83	April 4, 1983	Yes, #83004292	November 25, 1983	
CR-18	Pythian Temple & James Pythian Theater	More images	861-867 Mt. Vernon Avenue	635–83	April 4, 1983	Yes, #83004295	November 25, 1983	Now known as the King Arts Complex
CR-19	Engine House #16	More images	260 N. 4th Street	884–83	May 9, 1983	Yes, #95000580	May 11, 1995	Now known as the Central Ohio Fire Museum
CR-20	Joseph Henderson House	More images	5055 Dierker Road	883–83	May 9, 1983	No	N/A	
CR-21	North Market Historic District	More images	N. High, Goodale, Park and N. Front Sts, and the railroad	1630–83	September 19, 1983	Yes, boundaries the same, #82001460	December 30, 1982	
CR-22	Scioto River Bridge Group	More images	W. Broad, W. Town and W. Main Sts	1883–83	October 10, 1983	No	N/A	All three bridges have been demolished and replaced
CR-23	Jefferson Avenue Historic Group	More images	Jefferson Ave between Avon Ct and Almond Alley	2308–83	December 12, 1983	Yes, boundaries differ, #82001459	December 2, 1982	
CR-24	Dr. Lewis M. Early Residence	More images	108-110 N. 20th Street & 1047 E. Long Street	29–84	January 23, 1984	No	N/A	
CR-25	White Castle Restaurant		2725 N. High Street	405–84	March 19, 1984	No	N/A	
CR-26	H.A. Higgins Building	More images	129 E. Nationwide Blvd.	531–84	April 2, 1984	Yes, #79001836	August 27, 1979	Also known as the Flatiron Building
CR-27	Indianola Middle School	More images	420 E. 19th Avenue	775–84	May 14, 1984	Yes, #80003000	June 30, 1980	
CR-28	Rickenbacker Boyhood Home	More images	1334 E. Livingston Avenue	776–84	May 14, 1984	Yes, #76001426	May 11, 1976	Also known as the Captain Edward V. or Eddie Rickenbacker House
CR-29	W.H. Jones Mansion	More images	731 E. Broad Street	777-84	May 14, 1984	Yes, #78002065	October 2, 1978	
CR-30	Broad-Brunson Place Condominiums		1790-1798 E. Broad St., 8-44 Brunson Ave., 1795-1801 E. Long St.	1299–84	July 30, 1984	No	N/A	
CR-31	Avery Pontiac Building		1199-1207 Franklin Avenue	1846–84	October 22, 1984	No	N/A	
CR-32	Ohio Institute for the Education of the Deaf & Dumb	More images	400 E. Town Street	2119–84	November 19, 1984	Yes, #84000107	October 25, 1984	
CR-33	Indianola Elementary School	More images	140 E. 16th Avenue	2156–84	December 10, 1984	No	N/A	Now the Graham Expeditionary Middle School
CR-34	Felton School	More images	920 Leonard Avenue	16–85	January 21, 1985	Yes, #84003677	May 31, 1984	Demolished
CR-35	Columbia Larrimer Building	More images	161-167 N. High Street	15–85	January 21, 1985	Yes, #83001967	August 12, 1983	
CR-36	Valley Dale Ballroom		1590 Sunbury Road	500–85	March 19, 1985	Yes, #82001462	December 17, 1982	
CR-37	Broad Street United Methodist Church	More images	501 E. Broad Street	1187–85	June 18, 1985	Yes, #80002997	November 26, 1980	
CR-38	Old Beechwold Historic District	More images	Rathbone Ave, N. High St, Baumont, and the Olentangy River	1550–85	August 1, 1985	Yes, boundaries the same, #87001146	September 22, 1987	
CR-39	Iuka Ravine Historic District		Waldeck, E. Lane, Northwood, Summit, 19th Ave and 20th Ave	1551–85	August 1, 1985	Yes, boundaries differ, #86001023	May 8, 1986	
CR-40	Harrison House and Sullivant Land Office	More images	570 W. Broad Street	1552–85	August 1, 1985	Yes, #72001010, #73001439	December 15, 1972	
CR-41	Old Oaks Historic District	More images	Will, Mooberry, Kimball and Branger	2324–86	September 23, 1986	No	N/A	
CR-42	Hamilton Park Historic District	More images	Bounded by E. Long St, N. Garfield Ave, Avon Ct, and I-70	3079–86	January 29, 1987	Yes, boundaries the same, #83001968	July 28, 1983	
CR-43	Indianola Forest Historic District	More images	Pearl St, north side of E. Lane Ave, Summit St, Indianola and E. Frambes Aves	3080–86	January 29, 1987	No	N/A	
CR-44	Bryden Road District	More images	Bryden Rd between Parsons Ave and the railroad	1968–87	March 20, 1990	Yes, within Columbus Near East Side NR District, #78002063	May 19, 1978	
CR-45	Northwood Park Historic District		E. Northwood and E. Oakwood Aves, between N. High St and Indianola Ave	90–89	February 8, 1989	No	N/A	
CR-46	New Indianola Historic District	More images	4th St, north side of Chittenden, railroad, Rant Ave and 6th Ave	2344–87	December 8, 1987	Yes, boundaries the same, #85000947	April 30, 1985	
CR-47	South High Commercial Historic District	More images	S. High St, E. Main St, Pearl and E. Mound St	2343–87	December 8, 1987	Yes, boundaries the same, #83004301	December 29, 1983	
CR-48	21st & E. Broad Historic Group	More images	E. Broad west of 21st St	527–88	March 15, 1988	Yes, within E. Broad St. Multiple Resources NR District, #64000619		
CR-49	18th & E. Broad Historic District	More images	E. Broad St at 18th St	528–88	March 15, 1988	Yes, within E. Broad St. Multiple Resources NR District, #64000619		
CR-50	Central High School	More images	75 S. Washington Blvd.	1451–91	July 5, 1991	Yes, #85000484	March 7, 1985	
CR-51	Seneca Hotel	More images	361 E. Broad Street	2085–91	October 1, 1991	Yes, #83004300	December 29, 1983	
CR-52	Engine House #7	More images	27 Euclid Avenue	2313–94	November 8, 1994	No	N/A	
CR-53	Ohio Moline Plow Bldg.	More images	343 N. Front Street	3062–97	December 16, 1997	Yes, #99000701	June 10, 1999	
CR-54	North High School	More images	100 Arcadia Avenue	2173–00	October 23, 2000	Yes, #87000984	July 2, 1987	
CR-55	Northmoor Engine House / Station #19	More images	3601 N. High Street	2033–2003	September 24, 2003	No	N/A	
CR-56	Deardurff House / Franklinton P.O.	More images	72 S. Gift Street	1446–01	September 18, 2001	Yes, #73001435	March 20, 1973	
CR-57	Southwood Elementary School	More images	1500 S. Fourth Street	0937–02	June 25, 2002	No	N/A	
CR-58	Richard Berry Jr. House		324 E. North Broadway	312–2006	February 7, 2006	Yes, #05000754	July 27, 2005	
CR-59	Barrett Middle School (South High School)	More images	345 E. Deshler Avenue	1695–2006	September 25, 2006	Yes, #15000561	November 1, 2015	
CR-60	St. Mark's Masonic Temple No. 7 of the Prince Hall Free & Accepted Masons		988 E. Long Street	542–2009	March 31, 2009	No	N/A	
CR-61	Reeb Avenue Elementary School	More images	280 E. Reeb Avenue	1798–2013	July 22, 2013	No	N/A	
CR-62	Citizens Savings & Trust Company / The Ohio National Bank	More images	51 N. High Street	2191–2013	September 23, 2013	No	N/A	Now known as The Citizens
CR-63	1379 N. High Street Apartment Building	More images	1379 N. High Street	2192–2013	September 23, 2013	No	N/A	
CR-64	The Hamlet	More images	138-166 E. Fifth Avenue / 1193-1195 Hamlet Street	2193–2013	September 23, 2013	Yes, #15000040	February 23, 2015	
CR-65	United States Carriage Company	More images	309-319 S. Fourth Street	2236–2014	September 29, 2014	Yes, #15000325	June 8, 2015	
CR-66	Jeffrey Manufacturing Company Office Building	More images	224 E. 1st Avenue	2260–2015	September 21, 2015	Yes, #01000379	April 12, 2001	
CR-67	Old Airport Terminal	More images	4920 E. 5th Avenue	2261–2015	September 21, 2015	Yes, #79001839	July 26, 1979	
CR-68	Lubal Manufacturing & Distributing Company	More images	373-375 W. Rich Street	2262–2015	September 21, 2015	Yes, #16000459	July 19, 2016	
CR-69	Gale House Condominiums	More images	136 N. Grant Avenue / 360 E. Long Street	2263–2015	September 21, 2015	No	N/A	
CR-70	Columbus Dispatch Building	More images	34 S. Third Street	3108–2016	December 12, 2016	No	N/A	
CR-71	McClure-Nesbitt Motor Company	More images	1505 E. Main Street	1494–2017	July 12, 2017	No	N/A	
CR-72	Gilbert Hamilton House		290 Cliffside Drive	1733–2018	July 9, 2018	Yes, #89000175	December 16, 1992	
CR-73	E.O. Snyder Grocer		1223 E. Main Street	0965–2018	April 2, 2018	No	N/A	
CR-74	The Clifton		1233 E. Main Street	0966–2018	April 2, 2018	No	N/A	
CR-75	Dan's Drive-In	More images	1881 S. High Street	1734–2018	July 9, 2018	No	N/A	
CR-76	The Standard Building		174 E. Long Street	0702–2019	March 18, 2019	Yes, #100004597	October 28, 2019	
CR-77	Winder's Motor Sales Co. Building		182 E. Long Street	0703-2019	March 18, 2019	Yes, #100004542	October 18, 2019	
CR-78	Baptist General Association Headquarters	More images	48 Parkwood Avenue	1936-2019	July 31, 2019	Yes, #100005845	December 3, 2020	
CR-79	Market-Mohawk Center		250 E. Town Street	0669-2020	April 23, 2020	Yes, #100005454	August 24, 2020	
CR-80	Ford Motor Company - Columbus Assembly Plant	More images	427 Cleveland Avenue	0508-2021	March 11, 2021	Yes, #100006229	March 15, 2021	
CR-81	West High School	More images	120 S. Central Avenue	0371-2022	February 14, 2022	Yes, #100008068	N/A	
CR-82	Nagy Brothers Shoe Repair	Upload image	1725 Parsons Avenue	2271-2022	September 19, 2022	No	N/A	

== See also ==
- Lists of locally designated landmarks in the United States
- National Register of Historic Places listings in Columbus, Ohio
