= Broad-Brunson Place Condominiums =

Office building in Columbus, Ohio

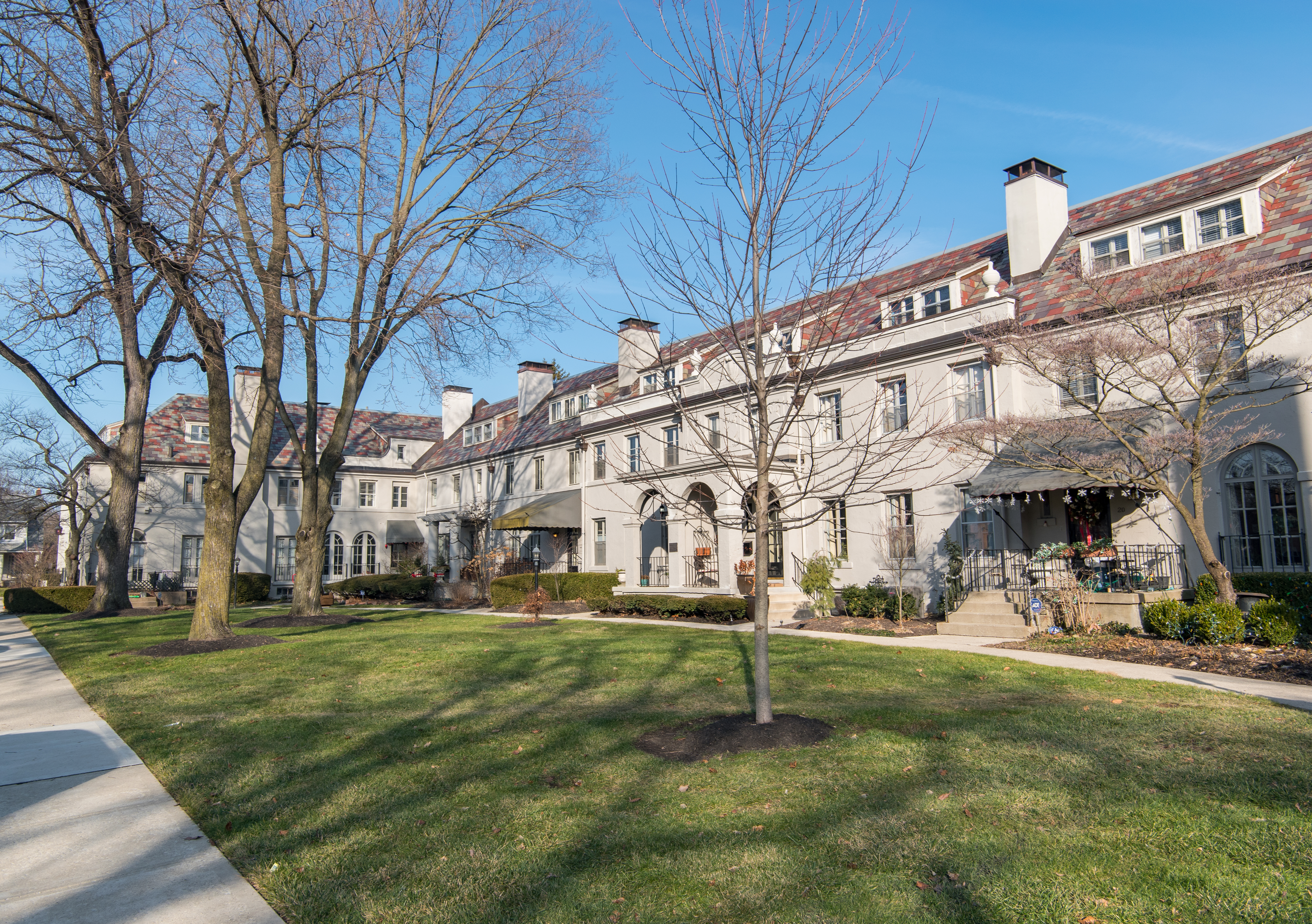
- Location: 1790-1798 E. Broad St., 8-44 Brunson Ave., 1795-1801 E. Long St., Columbus, Ohio
- Coordinates: 39.9683°N 82.9531°W
- Built: c. 1920

Columbus Register of Historic Properties
- Designated: July 30, 1984
- Reference no.: CR-30

The Broad-Brunson Place Condominiums is a set of condominium units in the Woodland Park neighborhood of Columbus, Ohio. The condominiums were listed on the Columbus Register of Historic Properties in 1984

== Attributes ==
The seventeen-unit structure was designed with French and Spanish influences. Its design was attributed to Robert Gilmore Hanford, though the attribution is unconfirmed. Hanford was responsible for the design of several similar buildings in the neighboring city of Bexley, including the Ohio Governor's Mansion.

The complex forms a rough U-shape, with most units facing west toward Brunson Avenue; some units open to the north and south sides. The east side of the block is primarily lawn and porch space for the units. The building has 2.5 stories, with stuccoed brick exterior walls and a colorful roof of red, green, and gray slate.

== History ==
It was built as an apartment complex c. 1920, but by 1976 it was used for condominiums instead. The complex was listed on the Columbus Register of Historic Properties in 1984.
