= E.O. Snyder Grocer =

Building in Columbus, Ohio

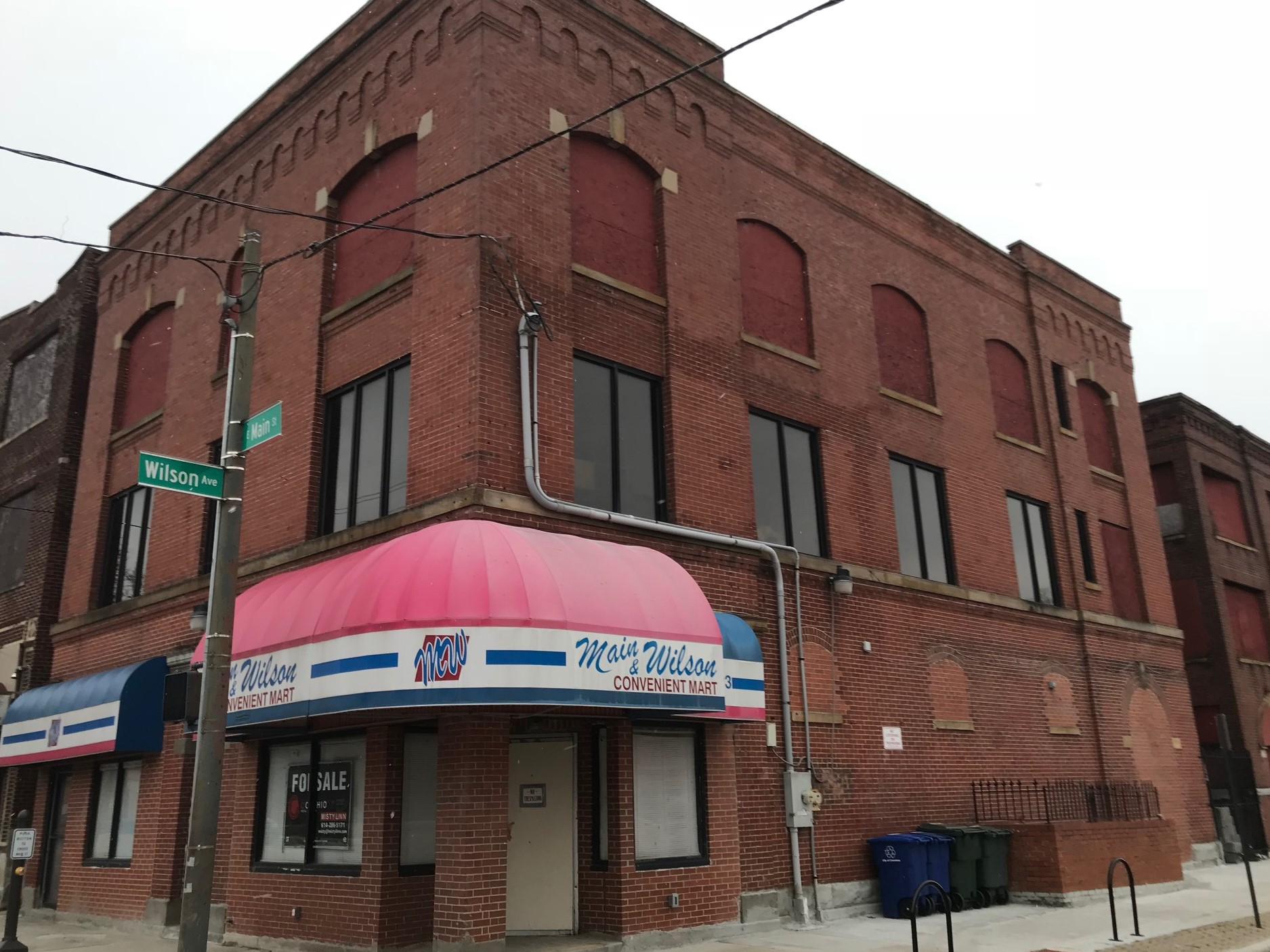
- The building in January 2018
- Location: 1223 E. Main Street, Columbus, Ohio
- Coordinates: 39.957579°N 82.966538°W

Columbus Register of Historic Properties
- Designated: April 2, 2018
- Reference no.: CR-73

E.O. Snyder Grocer is a historic building in the Near East Side of Columbus, Ohio. The building was added to the Columbus Register of Historic Properties in 2018.

== Attributes ==
The three-story building is located at the southeast corner of East Main St. and Wilson Avenue. The Merchant is the first coworking space in Olde Towne East. It has 7,300 sq ft (680 m^{2}) for shared workspaces.

== History ==
The building was a merchant stand for the decades: E.O. Snyder first owned it, from 1907 to 1917. In a recent ownership, the building housed a convenience store, with residential units in the floors above. In 2018, it began conversion into a coworking space called The Merchant. The building owners received $191,000 in state historic tax credits for the renovation, set to cost $1.5 million. The work would create an open space on the ground floor for workers and separated offices on the upper two floors. The couple renovating it tore down a building behind the grocery, leaving a large enclosed patio. They preserved and restored original brick, woodwork, and flooring, and replaced windows.
