= Gale House Condominiums =

Building in Columbus, Ohio

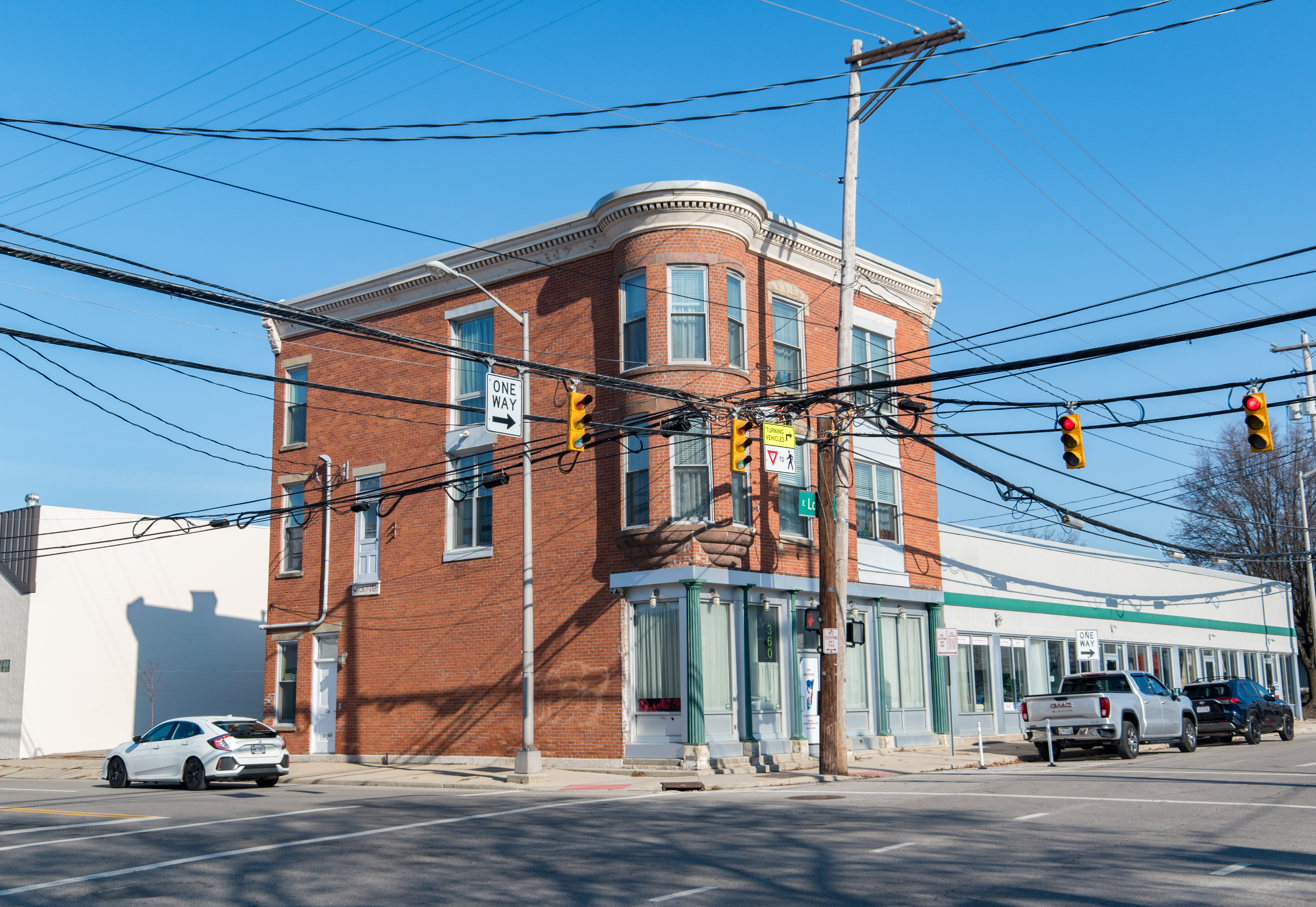
- Location: 136 N. Grant Avenue or 360 E. Long Street, Columbus, Ohio
- Coordinates: 39.966224°N 82.991415°W
- Built: Mid-to-late 1800s

Columbus Register of Historic Properties
- Designated: September 21, 2015
- Reference no.: CR-69

The Gale House Condominiums is a historic building in Downtown Columbus, Ohio. It was listed on the Columbus Register of Historic Properties in 2015. It was historically a mixed-use building, with retail (Gold's Pharmacy) on the first floor and residential space above. Today it houses residential and office space.

The building is classified as a vernacular Victorian commercial structure. It has three stories, a stone foundation, brick walls, and brownstone bands. It has a sloping semi-flat roof. The three-story section has a hanging turret trimmed in brownstone on its southwest corner. The windows have limestone lintels and sills, some with a keystone motif. The building also has its original ornate cornice, featuring dental molding and scrollwork.

The building was constructed in the mid-to-late 1800s by Franklin Gale, the editor of The Ohio Statesman. His family owned the structure until 1928. It changed hands several times. A single-story addition was built to the east in the 1930s, and expanded in the 1940s. From about 1971 to 2009, Inkling Printing operated out of the building. It was then sold several times, most lately to Savage Real Estate, in 2014. The building was restored to its near-original appearance, though no early photographs of it exist. Its original cast iron columns were exposed, as well as an original tin ceiling. The first floor was renovated for retail storefront use, while the second and third were developed into a residential unit.

The building features a "local landmark", a door on the second story with no stairs or balcony attached. A sign below it reads "Watch the 1st Step!", and an original stained glass transom window is set above it.
