= Indianola Forest Historic District =

Historic district in Columbus, Ohio

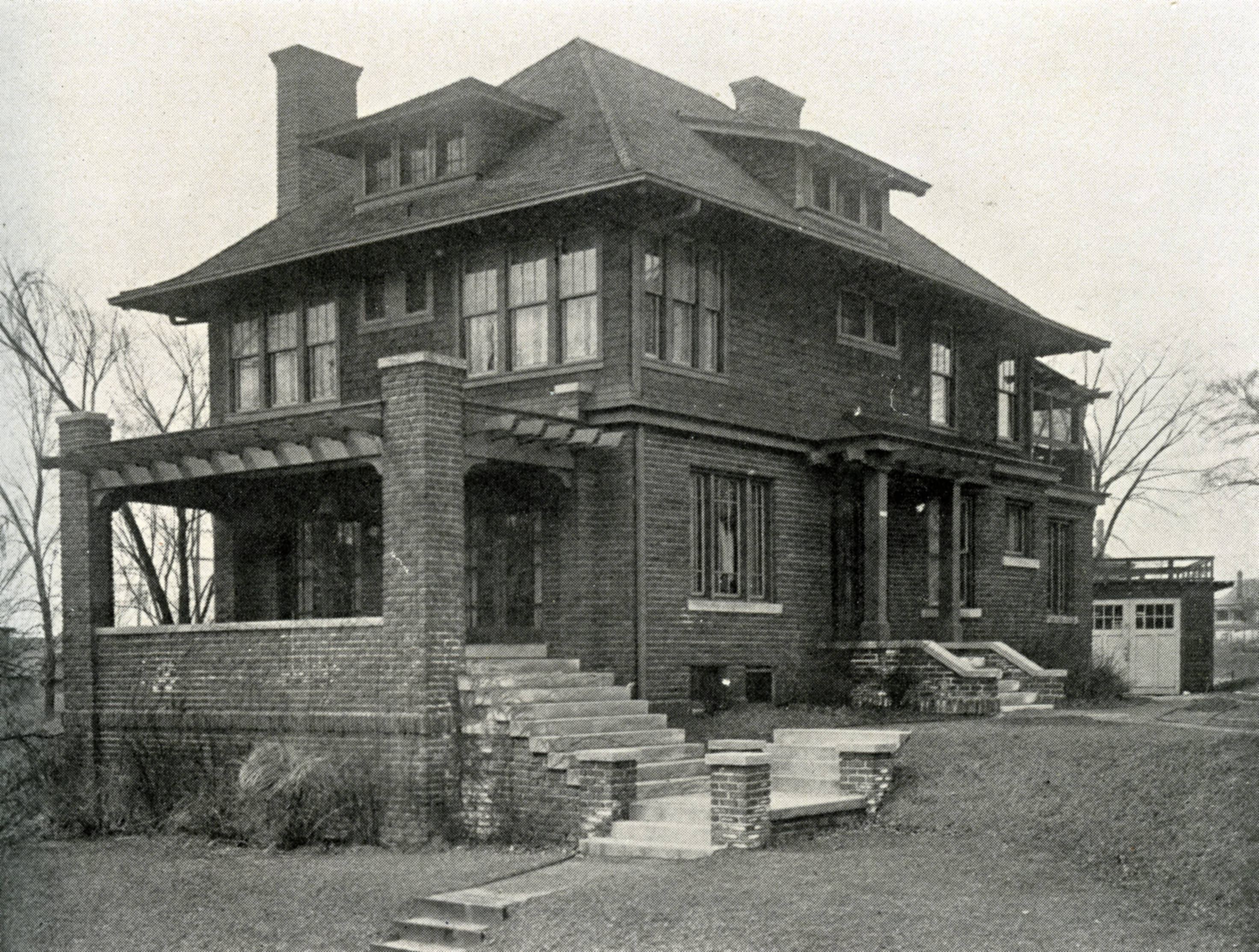
- Contributing house, 1961
- Interactive map highlighting the district among other historic sites
- Location: Pearl St., north side of E. Lane Ave., Summit St., Indianola and E. Frambes Aves., Columbus, Ohio

Columbus Register of Historic Properties
- Designated: January 29, 1987
- Reference no.: CR-43

Indianola Forest Historic District is a historic district in the University District of Columbus, Ohio. The district lies east of the Ohio State University. Architectural styles of the houses in the district include Craftsman, Tudor Revival, and Dutch Colonial Revival.

The district was developed at the turn of the 20th century, with most land laid out between 1873 and 1908, and most structures constructed by 1913. The district was a streetcar suburb of Columbus, mostly with single-family houses, most of which have since been converted to contain multiple units. The historic district was established through listing on the Columbus Register of Historic Properties in 1987.
