= New Indianola Historic District =

Historic district in Ohio, United States

- U.S. National Register of Historic Places
- U.S. Historic district
- Columbus Register of Historic Properties
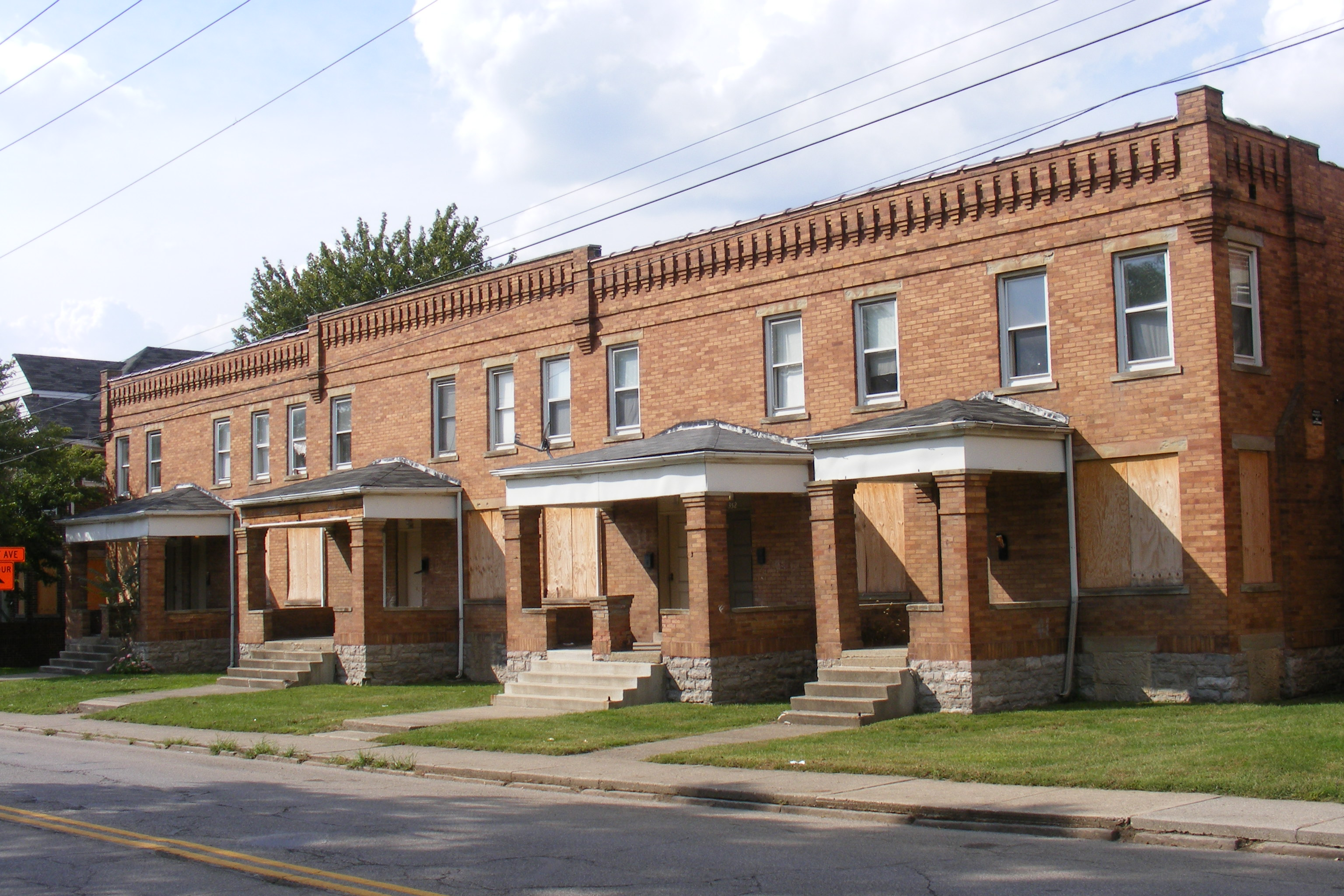
- Grant Commons, contributing buildings
- Interactive map highlighting the district among other historic sites
- Location: Columbus, Ohio
- Coordinates: 39.992958°N 82.998295°W
- NRHP reference No.: 85000947
- CRHP No.: CR-46

Significant dates
- Added to NRHP: April 30, 1985
- Designated CRHP: December 8, 1987

The New Indianola Historic District is a historic district in the Weinland Park and Indianola Terrace neighborhoods in Columbus, Ohio's University District. The site was listed on the National Register of Historic Places in 1985 and the Columbus Register of Historic Properties in 1987.

The district was platted in 1916, and all but two of its structures were built by 1921 (as of 1987). Most are two-story houses with brick exteriors, many with porches.

== See also ==
- National Register of Historic Places listings in Columbus, Ohio
