= Avery Pontiac Building =

Historic building in Columbus, Ohio

- U.S. Historic district – Contributing property
- Columbus Register of Historic Properties
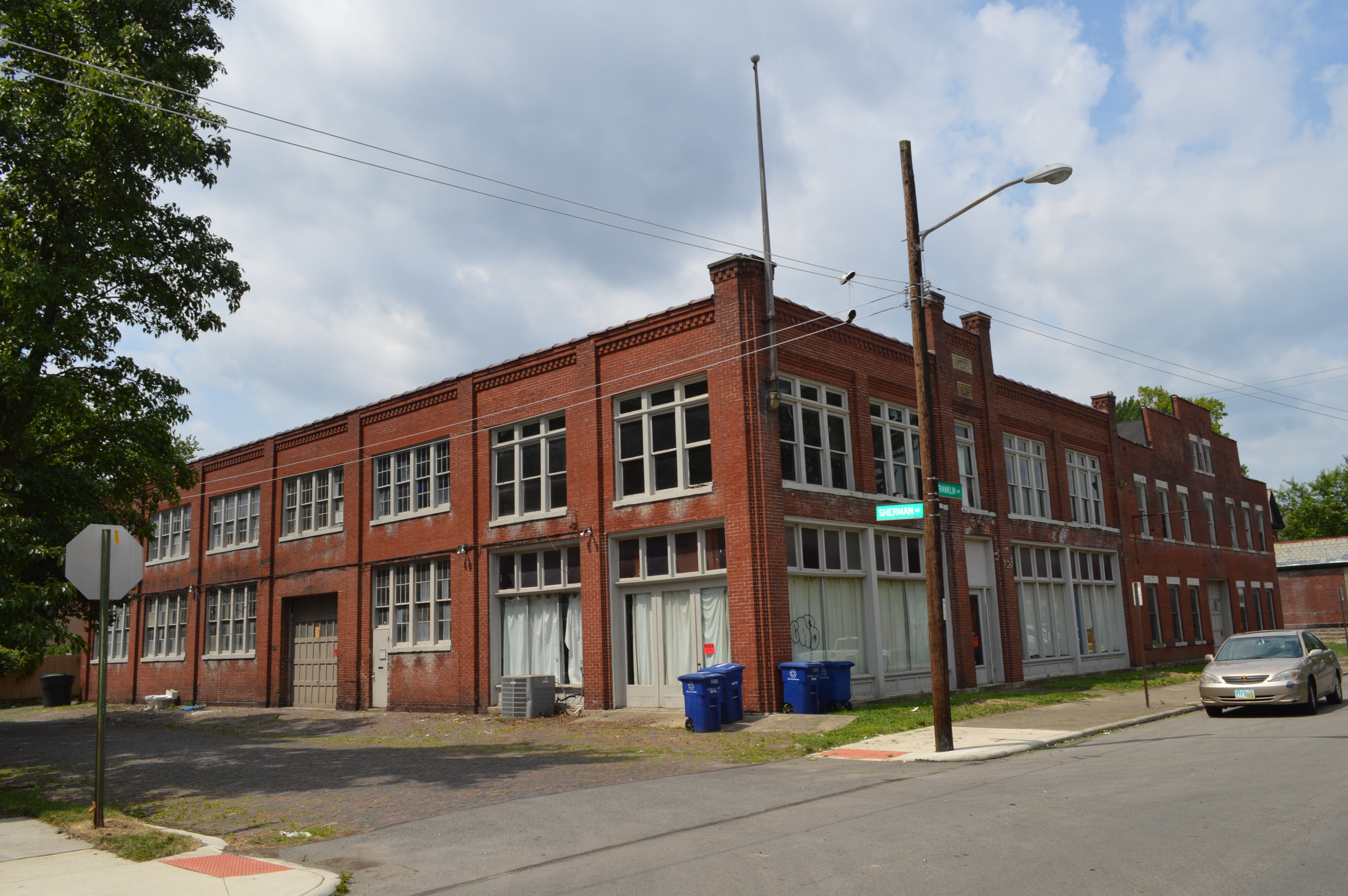
- Location: 1199-1207 Franklin Avenue, Columbus, Ohio
- Coordinates: 39.961427°N 82.967921°W
- Built: 1909
- Part of: Columbus Near East Side District (ID78002063)
- CRHP No.: CR-31
- Designated CRHP: October 22, 1984

The Avery Pontiac Building is a historic building in Columbus, Ohio. It is located in Columbus's Near East Side, roughly between the Franklin Park and Olde Towne East neighborhoods. The building was added to the Columbus Near East Side District (on the National Register of Historic Places) in 1978. It was individually listed on the Columbus Register of Historic Properties in 1984.

The 22,500 sq ft (2,090 m^{2}) building was constructed as the Avery Pontiac dealership in 1909. It became used for a warehouse and later as an artist and photographer living space. In March 2017, the city forced over a dozen tenants out, after finding numerous serious code violations and deeming it unsafe for habitation. In November 2017, a developer announced it wants to convert the buildings into apartment units and a first-floor restaurant. The project, estimated to cost $1.5 million, would create 15 living units. A renovation process was reported to be approved by city commissions, though not yet approved by city council, as of January 2018.

== See also ==
- National Register of Historic Places listings in Columbus, Ohio
