= The Hamlet (Columbus, Ohio) =

- U.S. National Register of Historic Places
- Columbus Register of Historic Properties
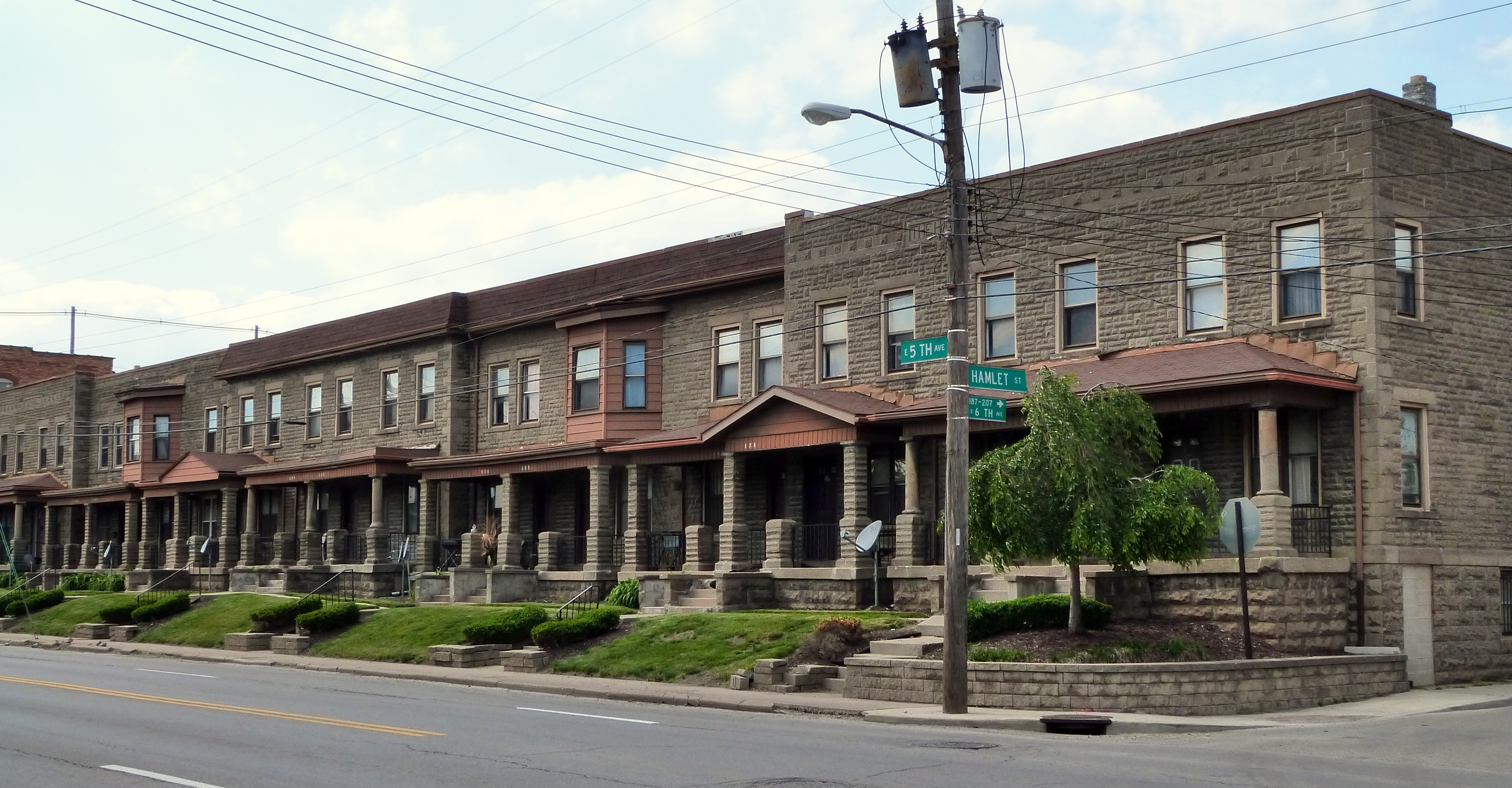
- Interactive map highlighting the building's location
- Location: 138–166 East 5th and 1193–1195 Hamlet Sts., Columbus, Ohio
- Coordinates: 39.98713°N 83.00132°W
- NRHP reference No.: 15000040
- CRHP No.: CR-64

Significant dates
- Added to NRHP: February 23, 2015
- Designated CRHP: September 23, 2013

The Hamlet is a historic set of buildings in the Weinland Park neighborhood of Columbus, Ohio, USA. It was listed on the Columbus Register of Historic Properties in 2013 and the National Register of Historic Places in 2015.

The Hamlet consists of a 16-unit rowhouse on Fifth Avenue and a duplex adjacent to it, on Hamlet Street. The buildings were rehabilitated by a non-profit housing agency to provide affordable housing.

== See also ==
- National Register of Historic Places listings in Columbus, Ohio
