= Krumm House =

Historic house in Ohio, United States

- U.S. National Register of Historic Places
- Columbus Register of Historic Properties
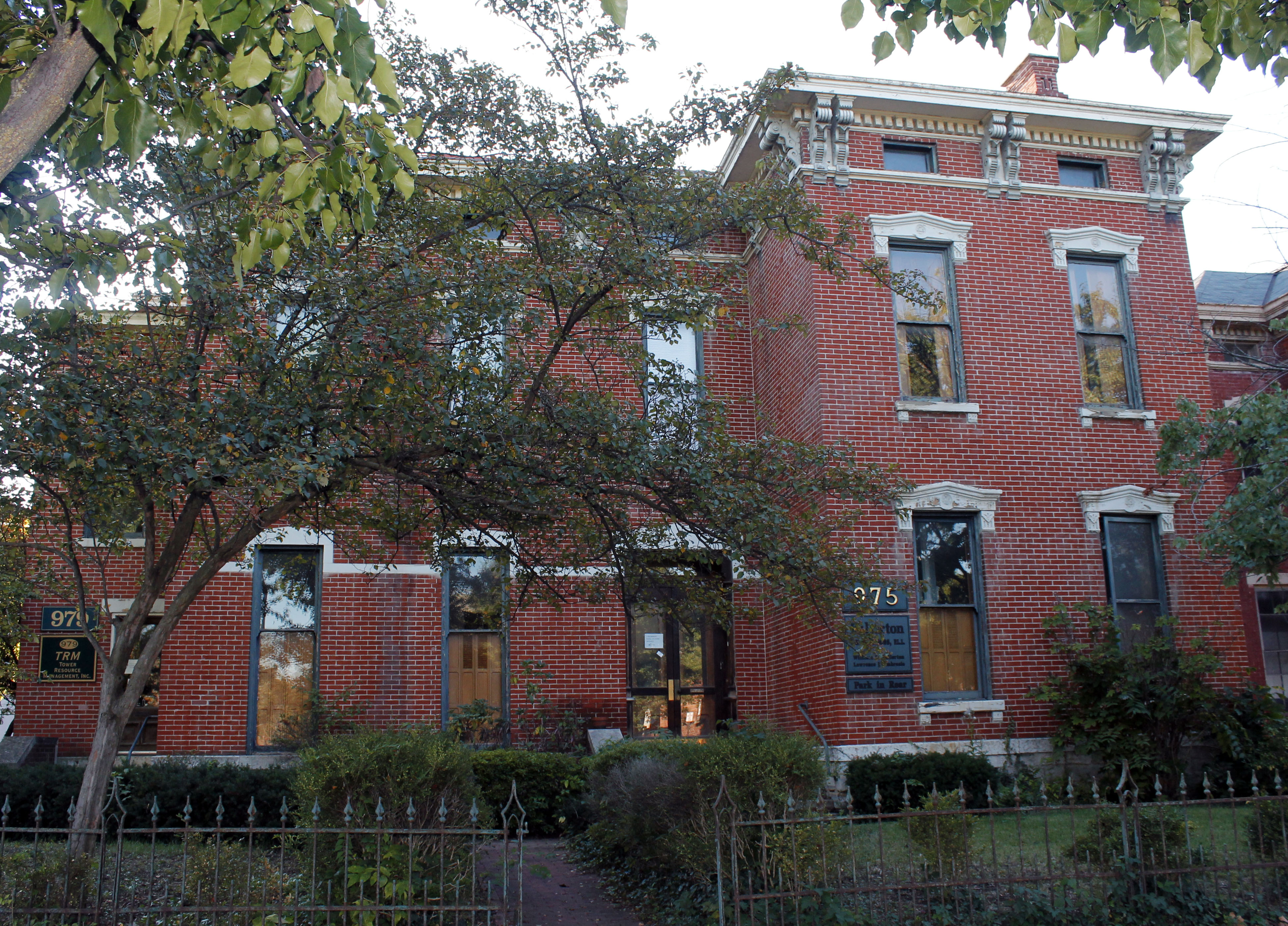
- Interactive map highlighting the building's location
- Location: 975-979 S. High Street, Columbus, Ohio
- Coordinates: 39.942121°N 82.997123°W
- Built: c. 1885
- Architectural style: Italianate
- NRHP reference No.: 82003568
- CRHP No.: CR-1

Significant dates
- Added to NRHP: September 30, 1982
- Designated CRHP: February 8, 1982

The Krumm House is a historic building in the Brewery District neighborhood of Columbus, Ohio. It was listed on the National Register of Historic Places and Columbus Register of Historic Properties in 1982. The brick house was built c. 1885. The building was home to Alexander W. Krumm, the Columbus City Solicitor from 1878 to 1883. The property is also one of few remaining late 19th century houses on South High Street.

== See also ==
- National Register of Historic Places listings in Columbus, Ohio
