= Joseph Henderson House =

Historic building in Columbus, Ohio

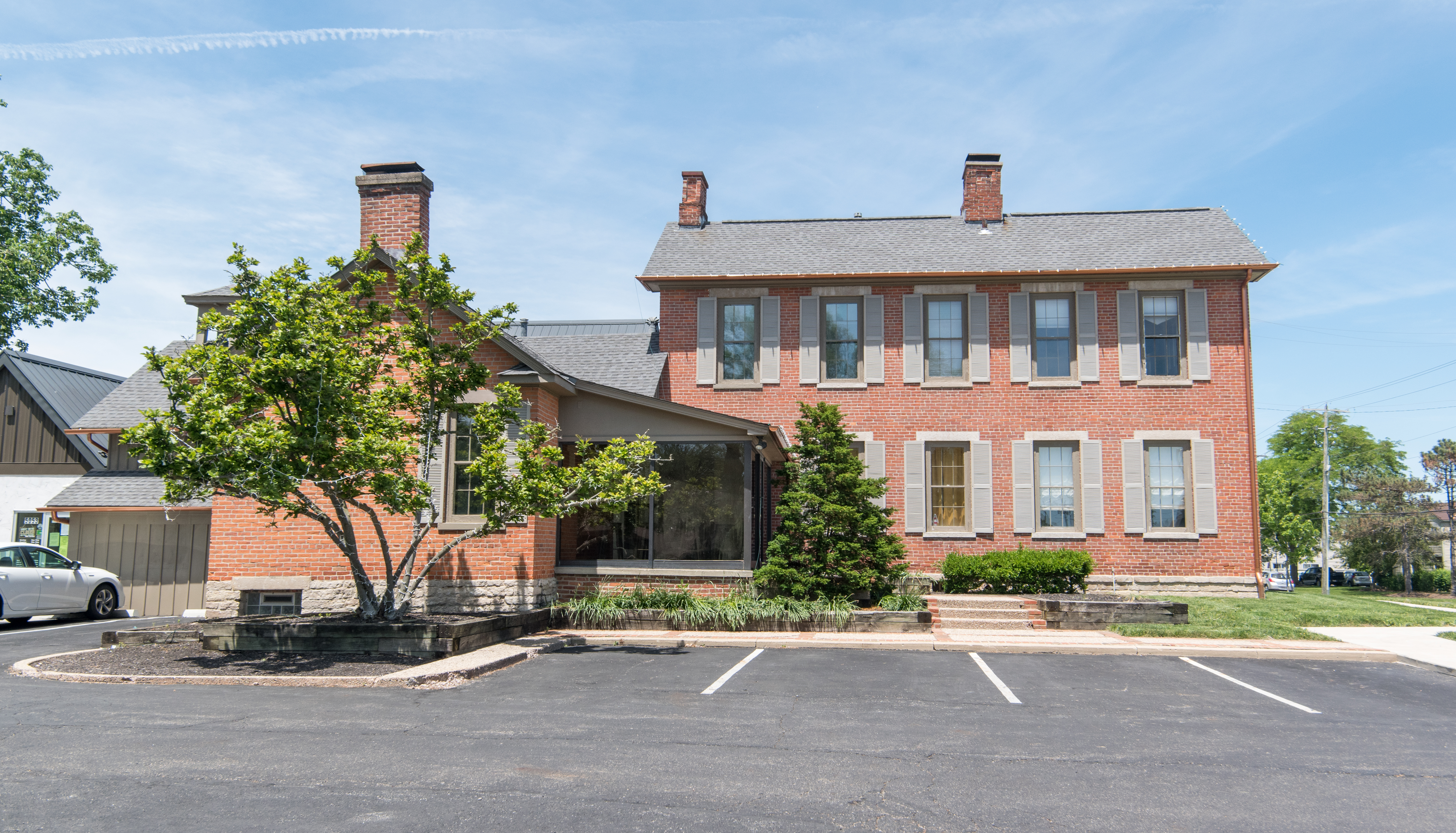
- Location: 5055 Dierker Road, Columbus, Ohio
- Coordinates: 40.061915°N 83.075454°W
- Built: 1859

Columbus Register of Historic Properties
- Designated: May 9, 1983
- Reference no.: CR-20

The Joseph Henderson House, also known as the A.H. Dierker House, is a historic farmhouse in Columbus, Ohio. The house was built in 1859 by Joseph Henderson for him, his wife, and their ten children. The family lived on-site until the 1930s, when Arthur H. Dierker's family moved in, living there until 1983. The house was added to the Columbus Register of Historic Properties in that year. Since then, the building has been used for offices, and since 2018, a local brewery.

== Attributes ==
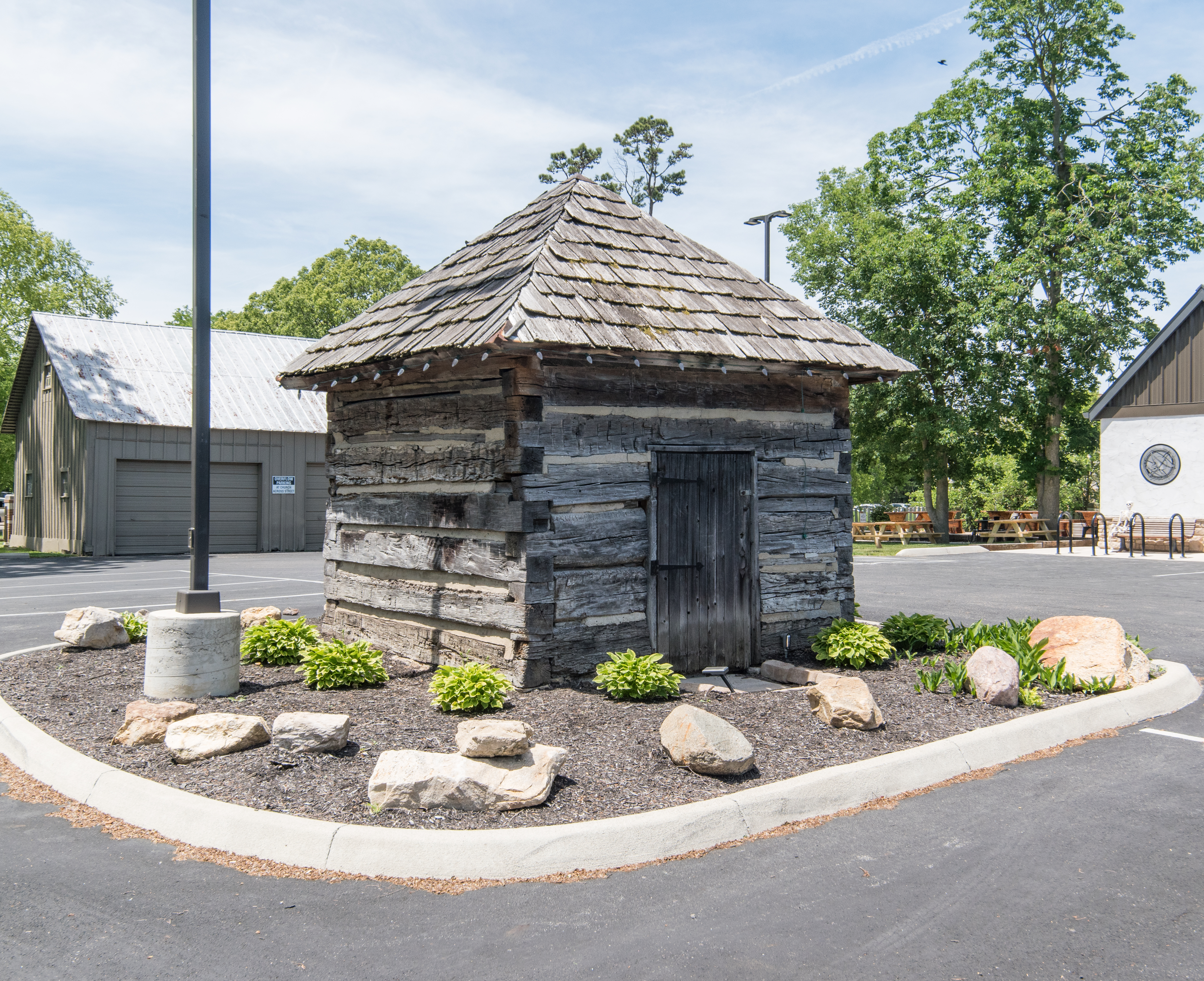
Outbuilding in the parking lot

In 1959, the building was described as homey, with a mellow structure and unusual twists in the floorplan. The walls of the building are brick, about 12 inches thick.

The building was constructed before many modern amenities existed, including electricity, heating, and plumbing. By 1959, under the Dierker family's ownership, the building was described as modern, with these modern conveniences installed. Closets were also created from old chimneys, odd corners, and hallway spaces. The kitchen was remodeled under the Dierkers, to a more open floorplan with a fireplace designed by Dierker. Exposed beams in the living and dining rooms were taken from surrounding farm buildings, as well as wood panels for the living room floor.

The house originally had a small wooden porch, which the Dierkers replaced with a brick and cement stoop.

== History ==
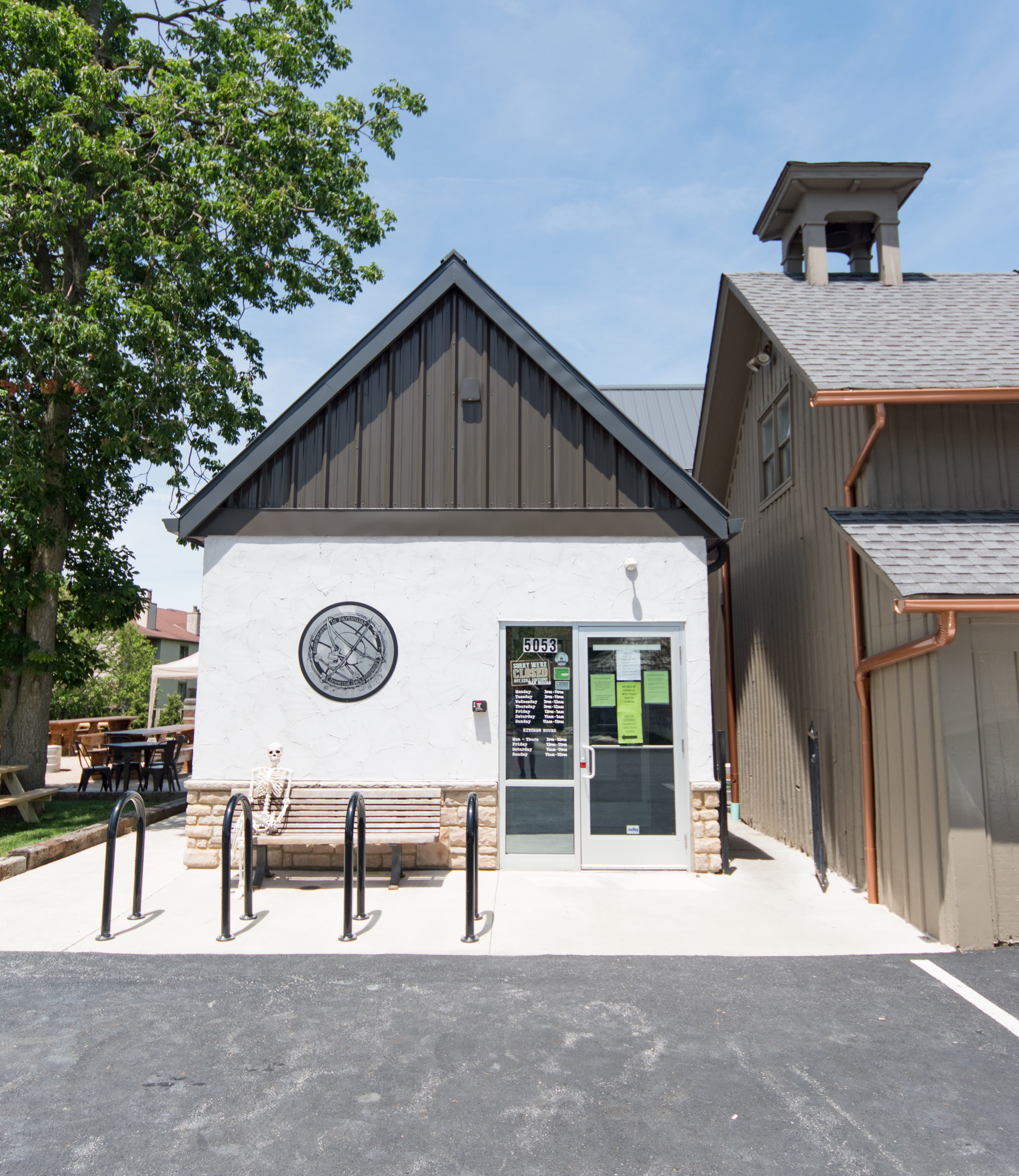
Brewery entrance

The site of the house was the property of John Stewart, a resident of Franklinton who purchased a Revolutionary War officer's land warrant for the 539 acres (218 ha) property. Stewart's daughter, Mary, inherited the land, and her son Joseph C. Henderson inherited it from her. Joseph built the two-story house in 1859. The Hendersons raised ten children there, and adopted a daughter, Mabel, who is said to haunt the house.

The Henderson family farmed the land, with 18 barns on the property, until the 1930s. In 1938, Arthur H. Dierker purchased the house and 68 of its acres. Dierker Road is named for him; it was once a private road to the house from Henderson Road, named for the Henderson family. The Dierker family owned the house until 1983, when the Borror Corp. purchased it and renovated the building into offices. The house was added to the Columbus Register of Historic Properties in that year.

By the late 1980s, the building housed an office for the Northwest Title insurance company. A massive fire took place in 1994, though the company made repairs and moved back within the same year.

In 2018, a brewery, Somewhere In Particular Brewing Co., opened in a space adjacent to the Henderson House, with a plan to convert the historic house's first floor into a tavern later on. The upstairs is currently used for office and storage space.
