= Valley Dale Ballroom =

- U.S. National Register of Historic Places
- Columbus Register of Historic Properties
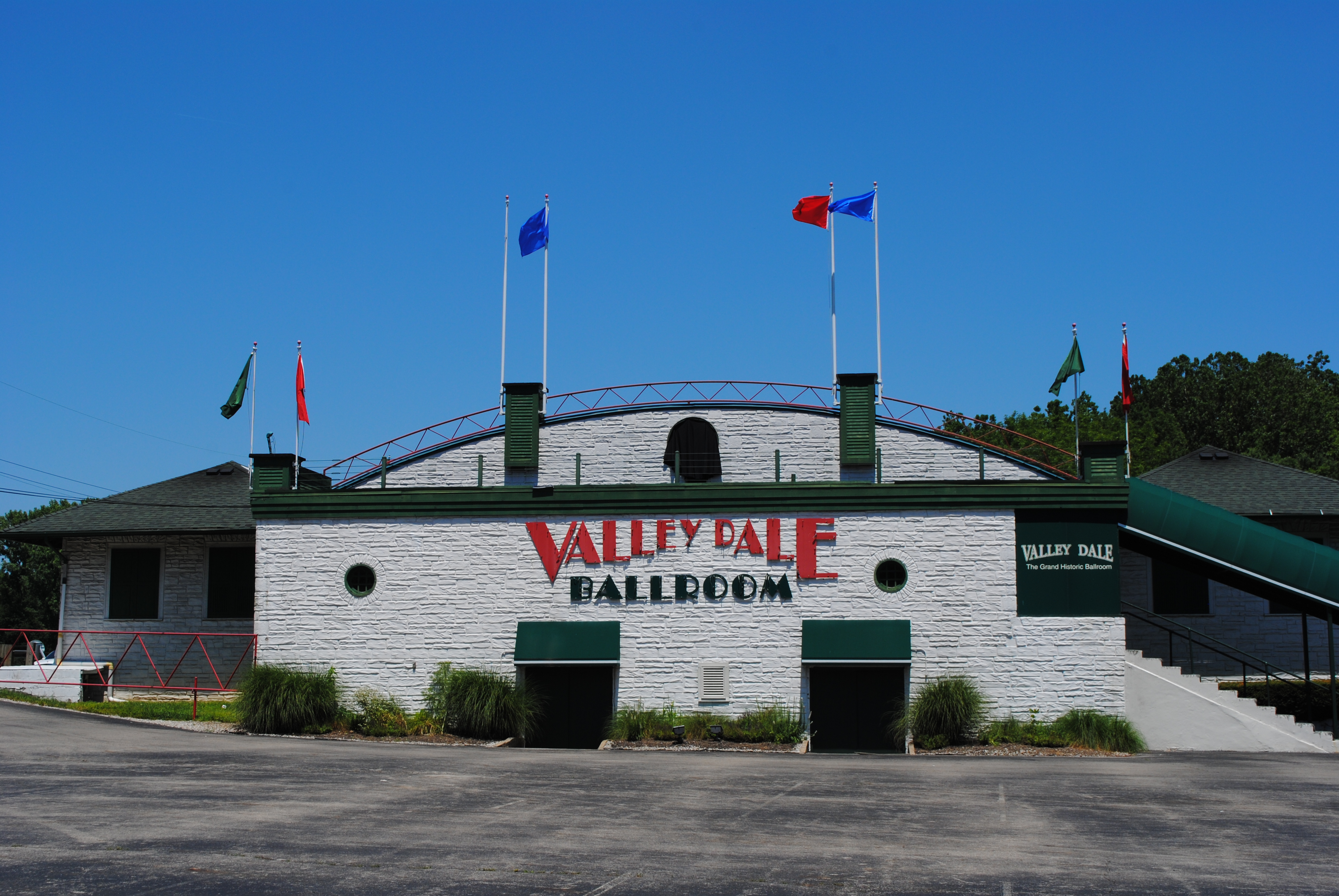
- Interactive map highlighting the building's location
- Location: 1590 Sunbury Rd., Columbus, Ohio
- Coordinates: 40.002408°N 82.937170°W
- Built: 1925
- NRHP reference No.: 82001462
- CRHP No.: CR-36

Significant dates
- Added to NRHP: December 17, 1982
- Designated CRHP: March 19, 1985

The Valley Dale Ballroom is a historic building in Columbus, Ohio. Constructed in 1925, it became a nationally known ballroom during the Big Band era of the 1930s and 1940s. It was listed on the National Register of Historic Places in 1982 and the Columbus Register of Historic Properties in 1985.

The first Valley Dale Ballroom was built in 1918, though it burned to the ground in 1923. The present building was built in the following two years. It was significantly remodeled in 1941. The ballroom hosted numerous bands in its history, including Rudy Vallee, Les Brown, Glenn Miller, Artie Shaw, Paul Whiteman, Guy Lombardo, Duke Ellington, Benny Goodman, Sammy Kaye, Tommy Dorsey, and The Velvet Underground, as well as prominent local musicians like Earl Hood, Chuck Selby, and Ronald Koal. The Peppe family has owned and operated the ballroom since the late 1920s.

== See also ==
- National Register of Historic Places listings in Columbus, Ohio
