= Second Presbyterian Church (Columbus, Ohio) =

Historic church in Ohio, United States

- U.S. National Register of Historic Places
- Columbus Register of Historic Properties
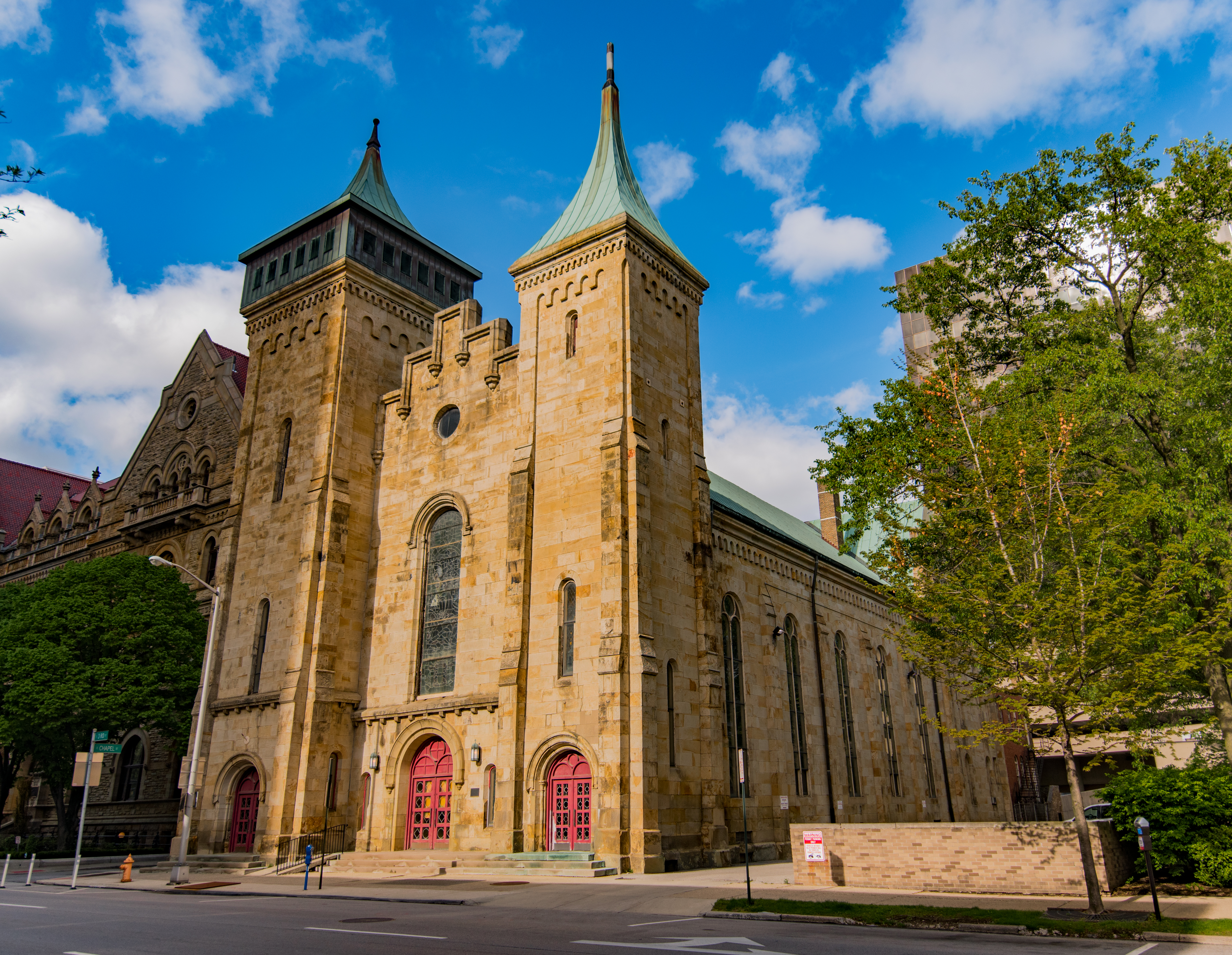
- Interactive map highlighting the building's location
- Location: 132 S. Third St., Columbus, Ohio
- Coordinates: 39°57′34″N 82°59′50″W
- Area: less than one acre
- Built: 1857
- Architect: Sidney Stone
- Architectural style: Romanesque
- NRHP reference No.: 83001972
- CRHP No.: CR-5

Significant dates
- Added to NRHP: January 11, 1983
- Designated CRHP: June 7, 1982

Second Presbyterian Church (also known as Central Presbyterian Church) is a historic church building in Downtown Columbus, Ohio. It was built in 1857 in a Romanesque style and was added to the National Register of Historic Places in 1983. It closed in November 2011. The site was previously the location of the first public school in Columbus, built in 1826.

The building was acquired by Columbus Association for the Performing Arts in 2013, and is being repurposed as a performance venue. CAPA CEO William Conner Jr. said the church building is "acoustically near perfect".
