= St. Mark's Masonic Temple No. 7 of the Prince Hall Free & Accepted Masons =

Historic fraternal building in Columbus, Ohio

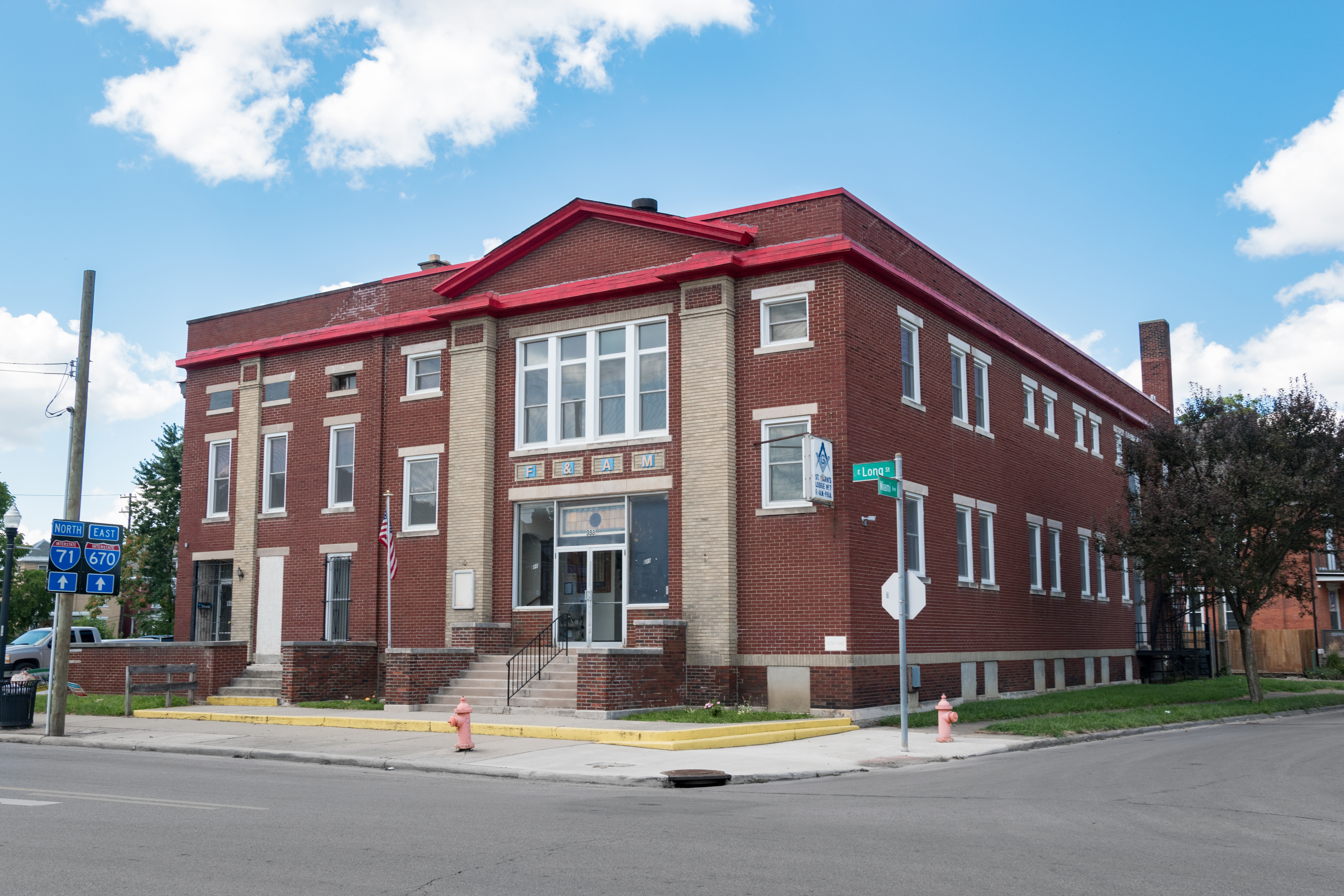
- Interactive map of St. Mark's Masonic Temple No. 7 of the Prince Hall Free & Accepted Masons
- Location: 988 E. Long Street, Columbus, Ohio
- Coordinates: 39.968210°N 82.974960°W
- Built: 1927

Columbus Register of Historic Properties
- Designated: March 31, 2009
- Reference no.: CR-60

St. Mark's Masonic Temple No. 7 of the Prince Hall Free & Accepted Masons is a Masonic temple in the King-Lincoln Bronzeville neighborhood of Columbus, Ohio, associated with the Prince Hall Freemasons. It was added to the Columbus Register of Historic Properties in 2009. It was listed under the register's Criterion B, for being closely and publicly identified with people who contributed to the cultural, architectural, or historical development of the city, state, or nation. Founding members of the lodge were part of the Underground Railroad network in Central Ohio and the Midwest.

The lodge is the oldest Prince Hall Masonic Lodge in Columbus and the fourth-oldest in Ohio.

== Attributes ==
The masonic temple is a brick structure facing East Long Street. It has a grand entrance flanked by pilasters made of blonde brick, a brick foundation above-grade, and wood-framed windows with stone lintels and sills. The structure incorporates an earlier building, dating to 1891 or earlier.

== History ==
The lodge became active in the mid-18th century, and its founders were identified as instrumental to the Underground Railroad efforts in Central Ohio and the Midwest region during the Proceedings of the State Convention of Colored Men held in 1856. In early 1919, the current site of the temple was selected; it was purchased on July 28, 1920. The temple was constructed in 1927 after membership pledges and loans were secured; the lodge room was dedicated on January 15, 1927.

The building was added to the Columbus Register of Historic Properties in 2009.
