= Hamilton Park Historic District (Columbus, Ohio) =

Historic district in Ohio, United States

- U.S. National Register of Historic Places
- U.S. Historic district
- Columbus Register of Historic Properties
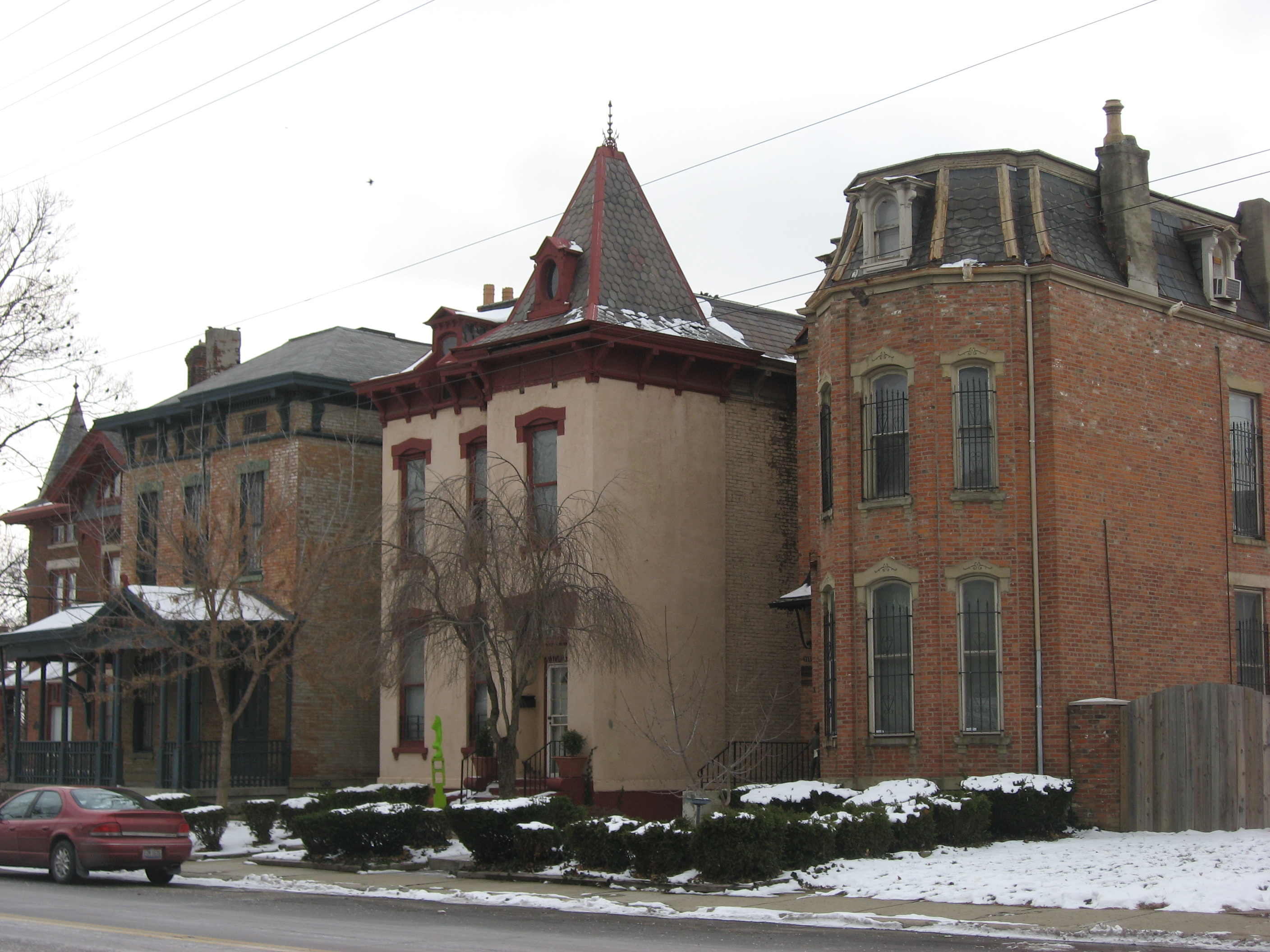
- Contributing buildings
- Interactive map highlighting the district among other historic sites and districts
- Location: Columbus, Ohio
- Coordinates: 39.96588°N 82.98146°W
- NRHP reference No.: 83001968
- CRHP No.: CR-42

Significant dates
- Added to NRHP: July 28, 1983
- Designated CRHP: January 29, 1987

The Hamilton Park Historic District is a historic district in the Near East Side of Columbus, Ohio. The site was listed on the National Register of Historic Places in 1983 and the Columbus Register of Historic Properties in 1987. It is one of few remaining examples of an 1880-1930 upper middle class neighborhood in Columbus. The district also contains an unusual street layout, with three parallel streets creating two islands. It is thought to have been one larger island originally, as can be seen on Jefferson Avenue.

== See also ==
- National Register of Historic Places listings in Columbus, Ohio
