= Richard Berry Jr. House (Columbus, Ohio) =

Historic house in Ohio, United States

- U.S. National Register of Historic Places
- Columbus Register of Historic Properties
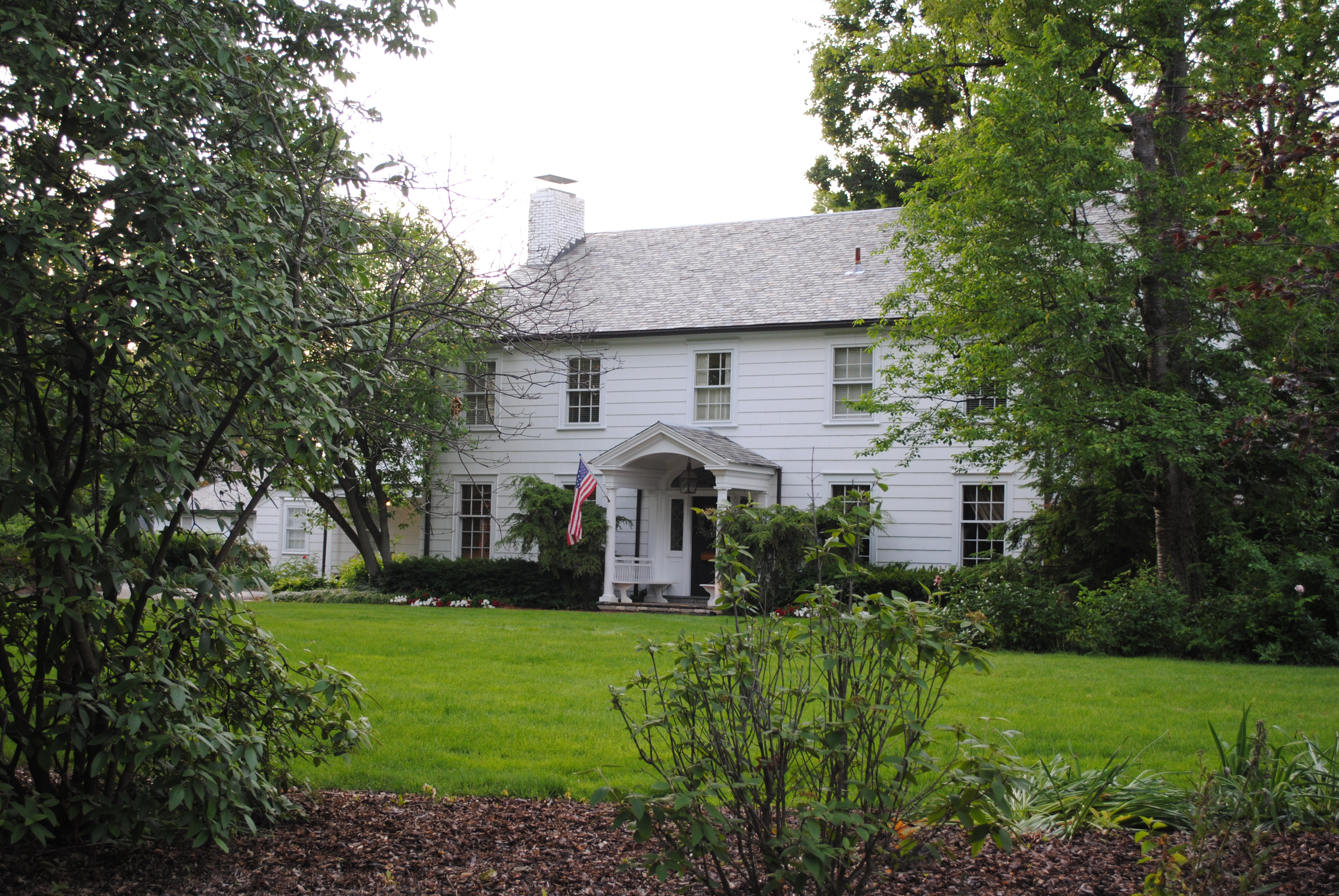
- Interactive map of Richard Berry Jr. House
- Location: 324 E. North Broadway, Columbus, Ohio
- Coordinates: 40.031891°N 83.006584°W
- Area: 1.34 acres (0.54 ha)
- Built: 1926
- Architect: Ray Sims
- Architectural style: Colonial Revival
- NRHP reference No.: 05000754
- CRHP No.: CR-58

Significant dates
- Added to NRHP: July 27, 2005
- Designated CRHP: February 7, 2006

The Richard Berry Jr. House is a historic house in the Clintonville neighborhood of Columbus, Ohio, United States. The house was listed on the National Register of Historic Places in 2005 and the Columbus Register of Historic Properties in 2006. The house is also a part of the East North Broadway Historic District, listed on the National Register in 2010. It is a well-preserved example of early 20th century Colonial Revival houses. It was built in 1926 and designed by Columbus architect Ray Sims.

== See also ==
- National Register of Historic Places listings in Columbus, Ohio
