= Broad Street (Columbus, Ohio) =

East-west street in Columbus, Ohio

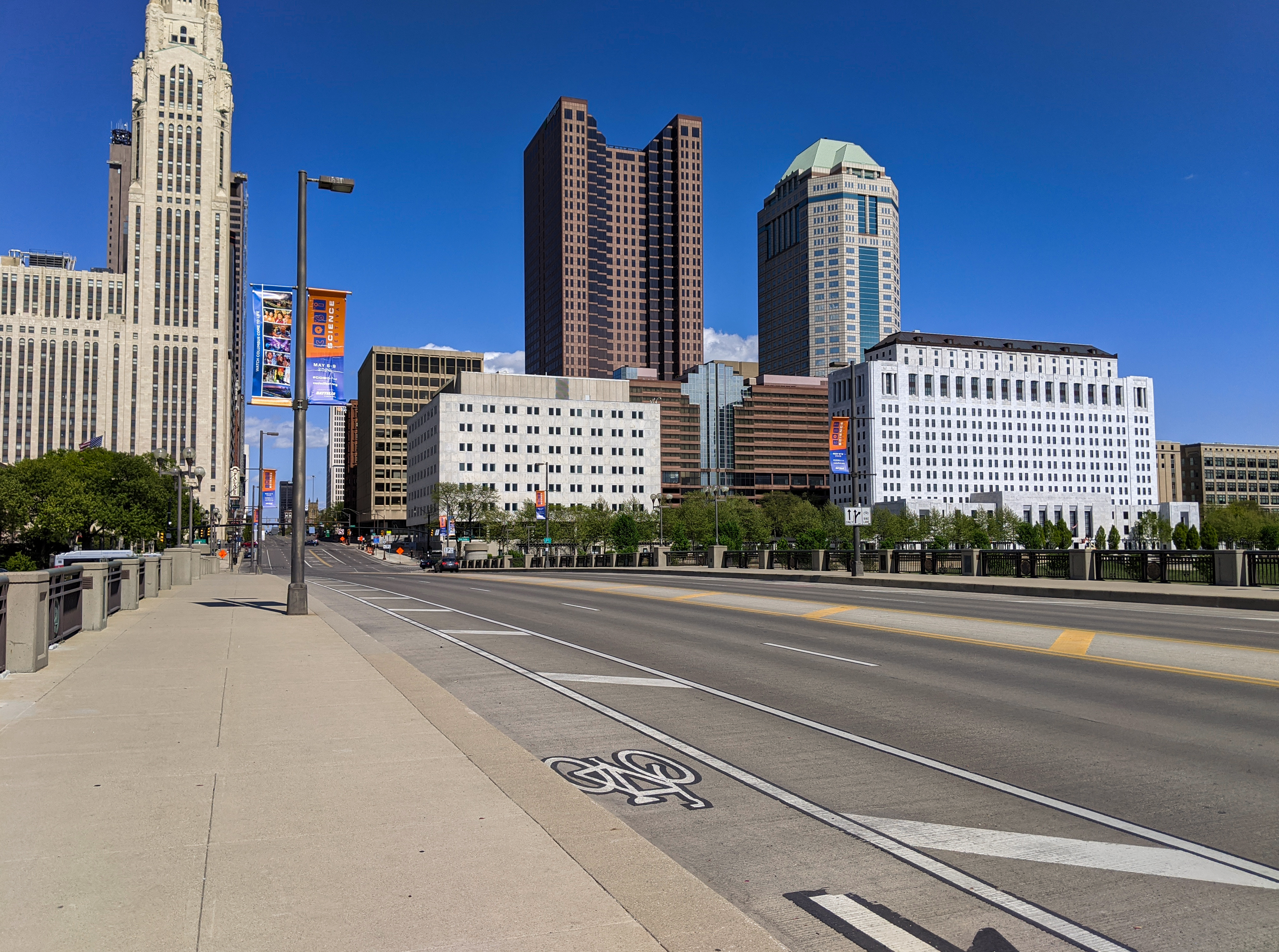
- Broad Street over the Discovery Bridge heading east into downtown
- Location: Franklin, Licking, Madison counties, Ohio
- West end: West Jefferson, Ohio
- East end: Pataskala, Ohio
- North: Gay Street
- South: Varies

Broad Street is a major thoroughfare in Central Ohio, predominantly in Franklin County and Columbus. It stretches east from West Jefferson at Little Darby Creek to Pataskala. The street is considered one of Columbus's two main roads, along with High Street.

Broad Street was first laid out around 1797, when Franklinton was settled. In 1812, when Columbus was founded, a new section of the street was built in the new city. The street first connected to the rest of the settled country in 1831, when the Ohio and Erie Canal reached Columbus. In 1833, the National Road was extended to Columbus, utilizing all of West Broad Street. In the mid-to-late 19th century, East Broad Street became a fashionable place for wealthy homeowners, and large mansions were built along the tree-lined street. Large hotels and apartments followed into the early 1900s. The street has seen numerous changes since then, including clearing and widening. Portions of the street were improved with trees, bike lanes, and rainwater basins in Franklinton, with additional streetscape improvements planned for other sections of the street.

== Route description ==
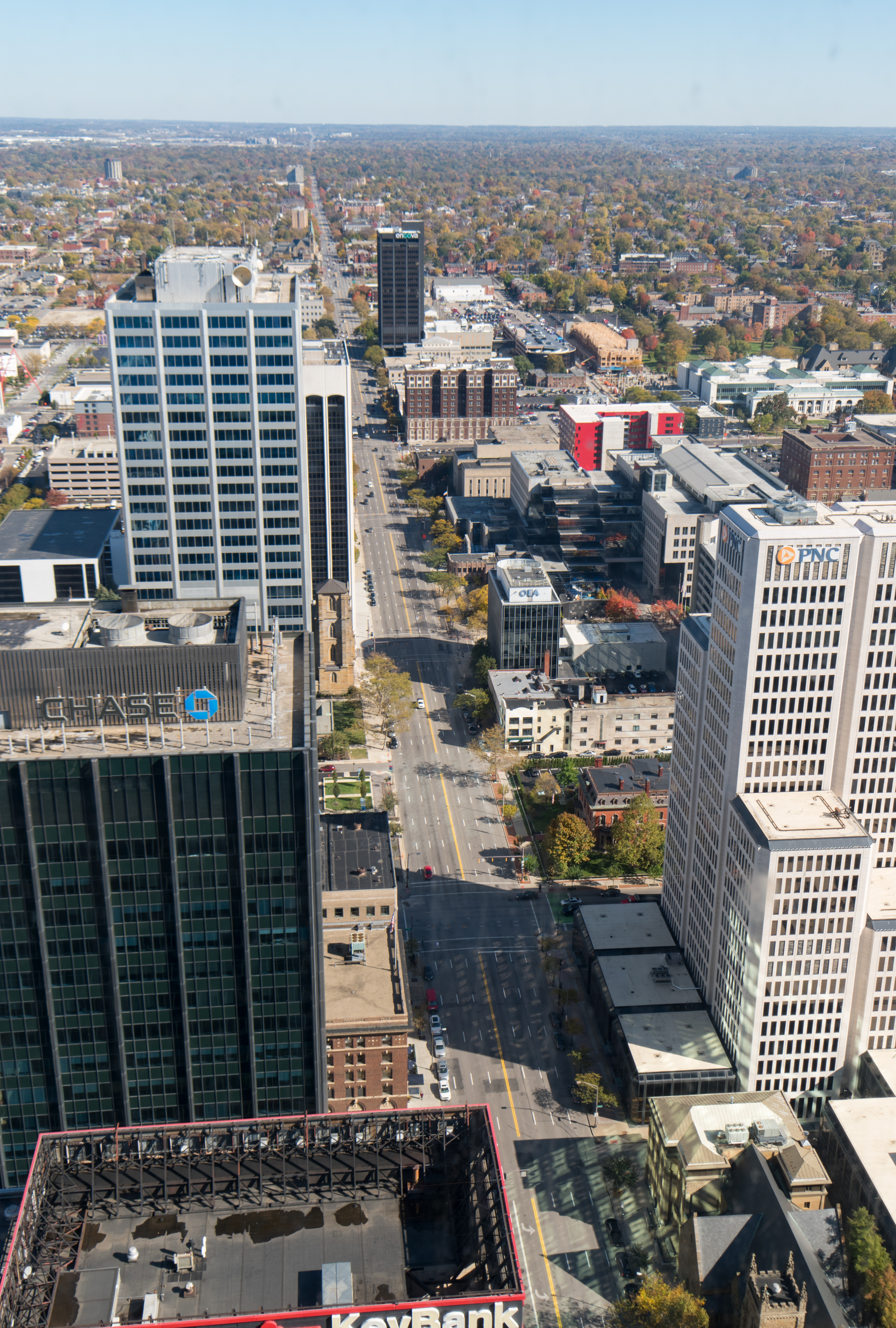
Broad Street looking east from downtown Columbus

Broad Street extends east and west far into Ohio, though it is named Broad Street starting at the eastern end of West Jefferson, Ohio (in Madison County). Continuing east, the road quickly enters Franklin County and passes by Lake Darby in Prairie Township. At about this point it passes into a portion of Columbus's municipal boundaries, though passes out to New Rome and Lincoln Village, both settlements that are part of Prairie Township. From there it passes through a series of Columbus neighborhoods. First is Hilltop, a large neighborhood in Columbus. It then passes through Franklinton. The road passes Franklinton and crosses the Scioto River on the Discovery Bridge, entering Downtown Columbus. Within Downtown, it first passes through the Civic Center followed by Capitol Square. It continues east through the Discovery District before exiting Downtown, crossing over Interstate 71 on a bridge known simply as the Broad Street bridge. It then passes through the city's Near East Side neighborhood, which has King-Lincoln Bronzeville immediately to the north and Olde Towne East and Franklin Park to the south. Broad Street then enters Bexley, a suburban city that is an enclave of Columbus. The road continues into a small area of Columbus again, an area that includes the Broadleigh neighborhood. It then passes into Whitehall, another enclave of Columbus. It resumes east into the easternmost portions of the city, where it then enters Pataskala, a small city, as well as Licking County. Broad Street terminates at the east end of the city, continuing on as Ohio Route 16 into Granville.

== History ==
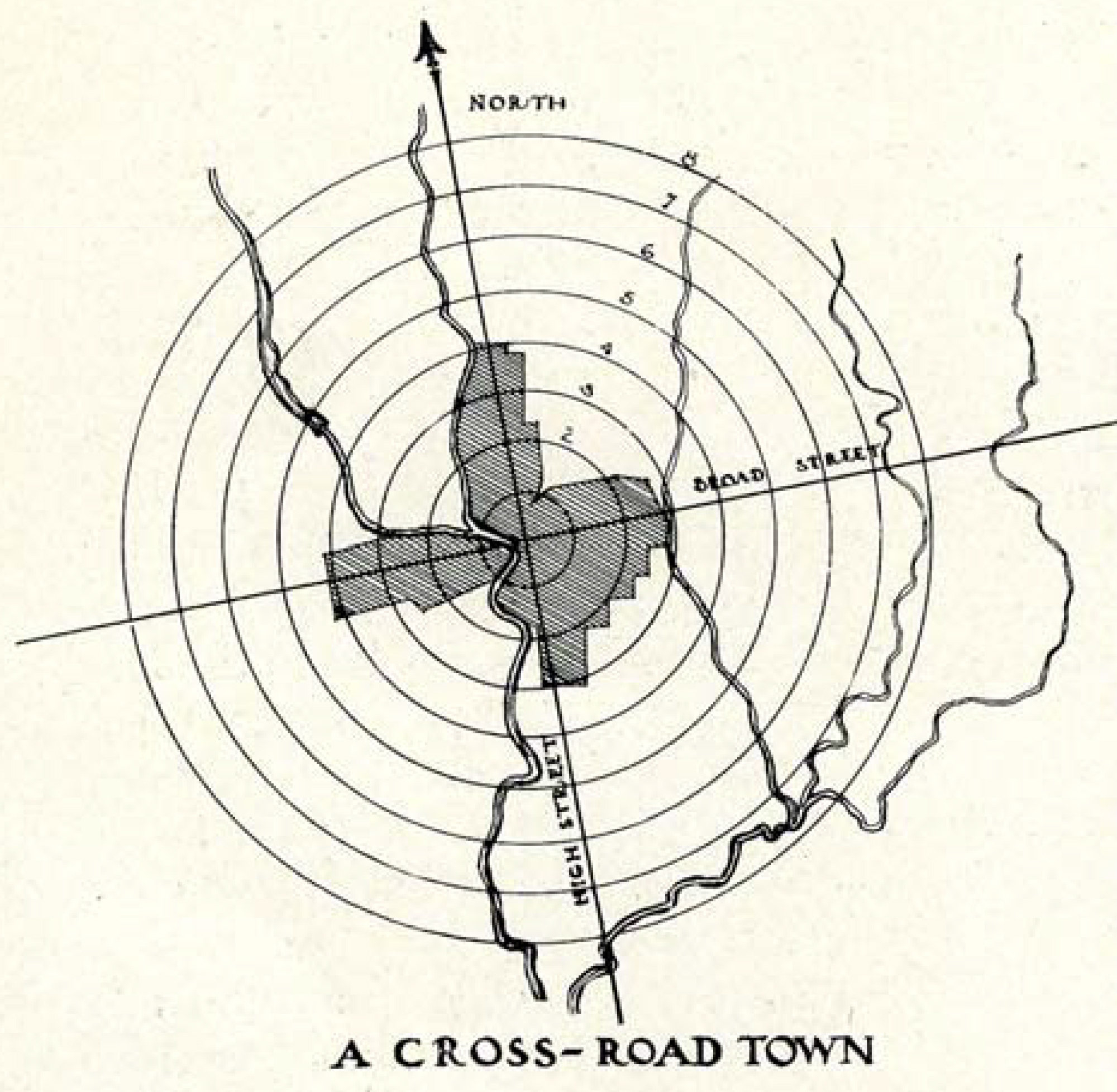
Broad Street (running roughly east to west) has always been one of the city's main thoroughfares. The other, High Street, runs roughly north to south.

Broad Street has been one of Columbus's two main corridors since its founding, along with High Street, meeting at a 100 percent corner downtown. The street has its origin before High Street and Columbus, with the 1797 founding of Franklinton. The first section of the road was constructed then, on the west bank of the Scioto River. Franklinton, then an independent settlement, had applied to be Ohio's capital. The settlement's founders were persuasive, though its flood problem led Ohio officials to choose the eastern bank of the river, on higher ground. Several streets were then laid out from the city's founding in 1812 into the following year, including Broad and High. These streets and the entire grid were laid out 12 degrees off from a north–south and east–west alignment. Broad Street's construction involved clearing dense forest, and tree stumps left behind caused horse-drawn carriages to maneuver around them, helping lead to the wide roadway.

In the city's early years, it was isolated from the rest of Ohio and the country. This was first remedied in 1831 with the opening of the Ohio and Erie Canal's Columbus Feeder Canal. In 1833, another connection began to benefit the city. The National Road, a project begun in 1806, reached the city in 1833; it utilized all of West Broad Street up to High Street, where it continued south and east.

Early in Columbus's history, around the mid-1800s, East Broad Street became one of the most fashionable places to live, from downtown past Franklin Park. This carried into the early 1900s, when grand hotels and apartment buildings like the Royal York and Brunson Place were built. One early house from 1838, the Alfred Kelley mansion, was torn down and replaced with the Christopher Inn around 1961, itself torn down in 1988.

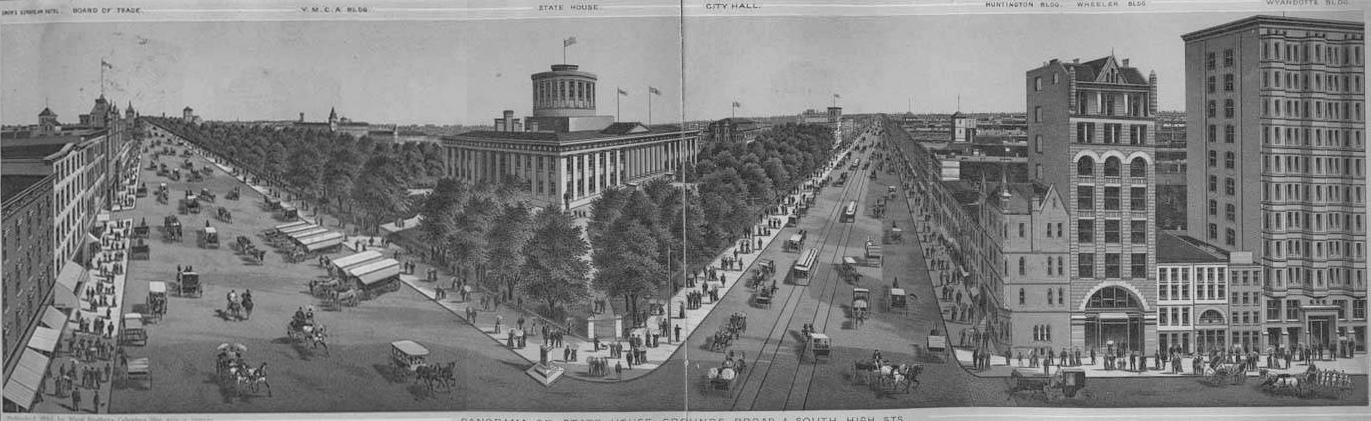
Broad (left) and High (right) extending east and south through Columbus past the Ohio Statehouse, 1893

Beginning in 1857, a large portion of the downtown stretch was converted into a lush boulevard with tree-lined medians. Local businessman William Deshler designed the streetscape after he saw tree-lined boulevards in Paris. The road was still made up of dirt and not significantly changed until 1873, when gravel and broken rock was added. In the early 1930s, with increasing automobile traffic, the streetscape was viewed as an obstacle or danger. Careless drivers would commonly crash into the road's trees, suffering injuries or deaths. Thus in 1932, after a public vote, the trees were cut down, the medians removed, and the street was widened by two lanes. Around the 1970s, Columbus mayor Tom Moody commissioned Vincent Ponte to redesign downtown Broad Street. Ponte proposed a similar parkway to what was built in the 1850s, but a lack of funding and concerns of impeding traffic caused the plan to not be carried forward. Starting around the 1980s, the remaining mansions on East Broad Street began to be repaired and restored to their original integrity.

In 1992, with the AmeriFlora '92 exposition approaching, the city again considered reworking Broad Street, including transit options or a parkway with medians. Again in the late 1990s and early 2000s, with a declining downtown population, Mayor Michael B. Coleman commissioned $10 million in studies. Coleman was the first mayor in years to promote walkable urban living, and the plan and its timetable continued, though continually pushed back and overlooked during the 2007-2009 Great Recession. The city's 2010 strategic plan again pushed for a walkable, narrowed Broad Street, among many other projects. With the redevelopment of Franklinton in the 2000s into the present day, some of the first streetscape improvements took place. In 2017, the city created a tree-lined median, painted bike lanes, two-way turn lanes, and grassy rainwater basins around a stretch of Broad Street just west of downtown. The work was intended to safely bridge two of the city's riverfront-area museums: COSI and the National Veterans Memorial and Museum. In 2019, the city announced it will continue the process through the extent of Franklinton, though without the planted medians.

== Attributes ==
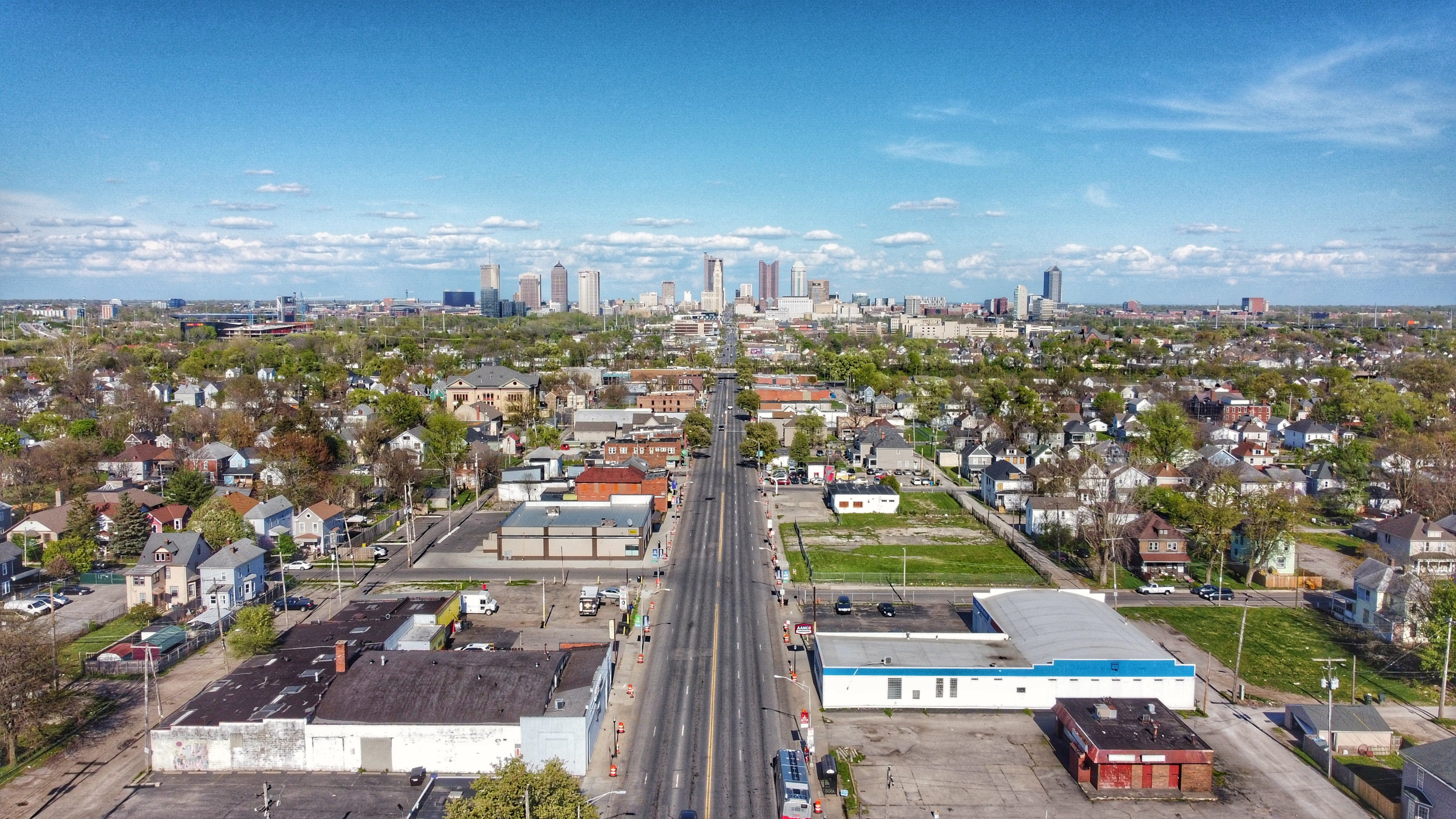
The street in Franklinton, west of Downtown

Broad Street and High Street both traverse beyond the extent of the city; High Street is the longest in Columbus, running 13.5 mi (21.7 km) (23.4 across the county), while Broad Street is longer across the county, at 25.1 mi (40.4 km). The city's street plan follows a grid pattern with the intersection of Broad and High Streets at its center. The address system begins its numbering at the intersection of Broad and High, with numbers increasing in magnitude with distance from Broad or High, as well as cardinal directions used alongside street names.

The street is named for its broad width; it was originally laid out to be 120 ft (37 m) wide. High Street was 100 feet wide, while most others were 82.5 feet, and alleys were 33 feet wide. Broad St. is among the widest streets in Columbus, with significant portions four to six lanes wide, often with additional parking or bike lanes. The city has discussed narrowing the road for pedestrian safety for decades. The street has a reputation as dangerous to cross without a walk sign, especially portions of West Broad that have large stretches without stoplights where cars speed by.

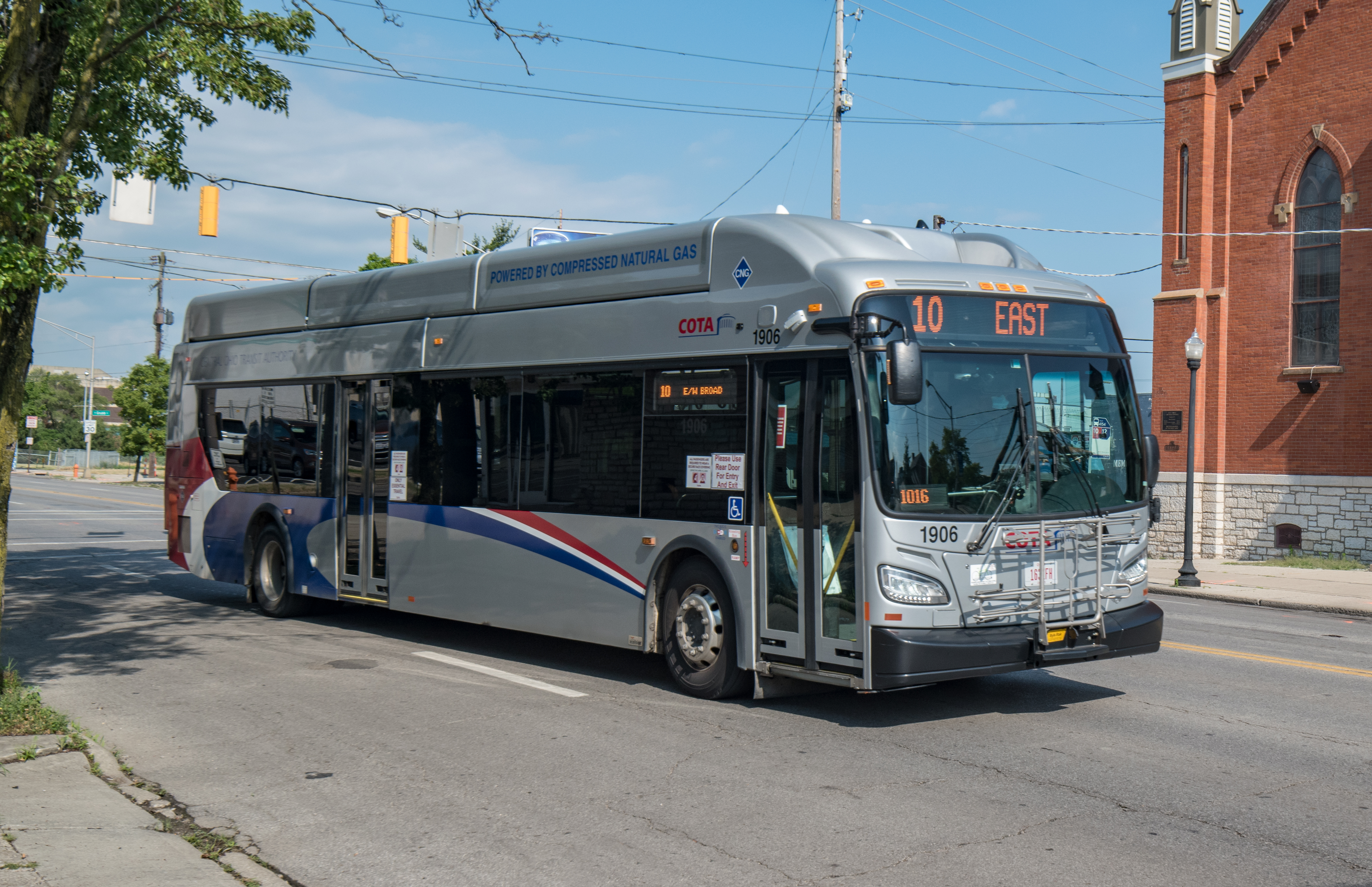
A 10 E Broad / W Broad bus in Franklinton

U.S. Routes 40 and 62 utilize Broad Street around downtown Columbus. For public transportation, the Central Ohio Transit Authority's Route 10 runs down most of Broad Street. Before the authority was created, the same route was operated by private transit companies with bus lines, and before that, streetcars and horsecars.

Beside the historic landmarks listed below, the street has numerous cultural landmarks and attractions. These include the National Veterans Memorial and Museum, COSI, the Scioto Mile park system, the Discovery Bridge, Columbus City Hall, the Rhodes State Office Tower, Franklin County Memorial Hall, the Washington Gladden Social Justice Park, and Franklin Park.

== Historical landmarks ==
Buildings on Broad Street can have one of several types of official landmark designations:

- The Columbus Register of Historic Properties (CRHP) is the city-wide historic register. The city's Historic Resources Commission and Historic Preservation Office are responsible for identifying and designating its landmarks and the buildings in the city's historic districts.
- The National Register of Historic Places (NRHP) is the United States federal government's official list of districts, sites, buildings, structures and objects deemed worthy of preservation for their historical significance.
- The National Historic Landmark (NHL) program focuses on places of significance in American history, architecture, engineering, or culture; all NHL sites are also on the NRHP.

=== Individual landmarks ===
Below is a list of historic sites on Broad Street, from west to east. Historic districts are not included in this table, but are mentioned in § Historic districts. Buildings within historic districts, but no individual landmark designation, are not included in this table.

Name	Image	Address	Neighborhood	CRHP	NRHP	Notes
Central Ohio Lunatic Asylum		1960 West Broad St.	Hilltop		Yes	Demolished by 1996
Franklinton Apartments at Broad and Hawkes		949-957 West Broad St.	Franklinton		Yes	
Gen. William Henry Harrison Headquarters / Sullivant Land Office		570 West Broad St.	Franklinton	Yes	Yes	
Engine House No. 6		540 West Broad St.	Franklinton		Yes	
Toledo and Ohio Central Railroad Station		379 West Broad St.	Franklinton		Yes	
Central High School		75 South Washington Blvd.	Franklinton	Yes	Yes	
LeVeque Tower		50 West Broad St.	Downtown	Yes	Yes	
Wyandotte Building		21 West Broad St.	Downtown		Yes	
New Hayden Building		16 East Broad St.	Downtown		Yes	
Hayden Building		20 East Broad St.	Downtown		Yes	
Ohio Statehouse		1 Capitol Square	Downtown	Yes	Yes	Also a National Historic Landmark
Chase Tower		100 East Broad St.	Downtown		Yes	
Trinity Episcopal Church		125 East Broad St.	Downtown	Yes	Yes	
Athletic Club of Columbus		136 East Broad St.	Downtown		Yes	
Empire Building		150 East Broad St.	Downtown		Yes	
Benjamin Smith House		181 East Broad St.	Downtown		Yes	
St. Joseph Cathedral		212 East Broad St.	Downtown	Yes		
Seneca Hotel		361 East Broad St.	Downtown	Yes	Yes	
First Congregational Church		444 East Broad St.	Downtown	Yes		
Columbus Museum of Art		480 East Broad St.	Downtown		Yes	
Broad Street United Methodist Church		501 East Broad St.	Downtown	Yes	Yes	
Ohio Farm Bureau Federation Offices		620, 630 East Broad St.	Downtown		Yes	
Frederick Prentiss House		706 East Broad St.	King-Lincoln Bronzeville		Yes	Demolished, site pictured
W.H. Jones Mansion		731 East Broad St.	Olde Towne East	Yes	Yes	
Central Assurance Company		741 East Broad St.	Olde Towne East		Yes	
East Broad Street Commercial Building		747, 749, 751 East Broad St.	Olde Towne East		Yes	
House at 753 East Broad Street		753 East Broad St.	Olde Towne East		Yes	
East Broad Street Presbyterian Church		760 East Broad St.	King-Lincoln Bronzeville		Yes	
Garfield-Broad Apartments		775 East Broad St.	Olde Towne East		Yes	
Joseph-Cherrington House		785 East Broad St.	Olde Towne East		Yes	
Saint Paul's Episcopal Church		787 East Broad St.	Olde Towne East		Yes	
Carrie Lovejoy House		807 East Broad St.	Olde Towne East		Yes	
C.E. Morris House		875 East Broad St.	Olde Towne East		Yes	
Broad Street Apartments		880-886 East Broad St.	King-Lincoln Bronzeville		Yes	
Erwin W. Schueller House		904 East Broad St.	King-Lincoln Bronzeville		Yes	
Linus B. Kauffman House		906 East Broad St.	King-Lincoln Bronzeville		Yes	
Cambridge Arms		926 East Broad St.	King-Lincoln Bronzeville		Yes	
Soloman Levy House		929 East Broad St.	Olde Towne East		Yes	
Sharp-Page House		935 East Broad St.	Olde Towne East		Yes	
Shedd-Dunn House		965 East Broad St.	Olde Towne East		Yes	
Heyne-Zimmerman House		973 East Broad St.	Olde Towne East		Yes	
Hanna House		1021 East Broad St.	Olde Towne East		Yes	
Scofield-Sanor House		1031 East Broad St.	Olde Towne East		Yes	
Broad Street Christian Church		1051 East Broad St.	Olde Towne East		Yes	
Prentiss-Tulford House		1074 East Broad St.	King-Lincoln Bronzeville		Yes	Demolished, site pictured
Johnson-Campbell House		1203 East Broad St.	King-Lincoln Bronzeville		Yes	
Frank J. Kaufman House		1231 East Broad St.	King-Lincoln Bronzeville		Yes	
Old Governor's Mansion		1234 East Broad St.	King-Lincoln Bronzeville		Yes	
Franklin Park Conservatory		1777 East Broad St.	Franklin Park		Yes	
Broad-Brunson Place Condominiums		1790-1798 East Broad St.	Woodland Park	Yes		
Columbus Country Club Mound		4831 East Broad St.	Greenbriar Farm		Yes	

=== Historic districts ===
There are numerous historic districts through which Broad Street passes. Buildings in these districts with individual landmark designations are described in § Individual landmarks. From west to east, the districts are:

- 18th & E. Broad Historic District, a city historic district, also part of the National Register's E. Broad St. Multiple Resources District
- 21st & E. Broad Historic Group, a city historic district, also part of the National Register's E. Broad St. Multiple Resources District
- East Broad Street Historic District, a national historic district
- Columbus Near East Side District, a national historic district

In addition, the Columbus Civic Center Historic District was deemed eligible for the National Register, though it was never added to the register.

== See also ==
- Geography of Columbus, Ohio
