= Broad Street Bridge =

Broad Street Bridge can refer to:

- Broad Street Bridge (Columbus, Ohio), replaced by the Discovery Bridge (Columbus, Ohio)
- Broad Street Bridge (Elizabethton, Tennessee), an historic bridge
- Broad Street Bridge (Rochester, New York), the re-purposed Second Genesee Aqueduct over the Erie Canal
