= Ohio Farm Bureau Federation Offices =

- U.S. National Register of Historic Places
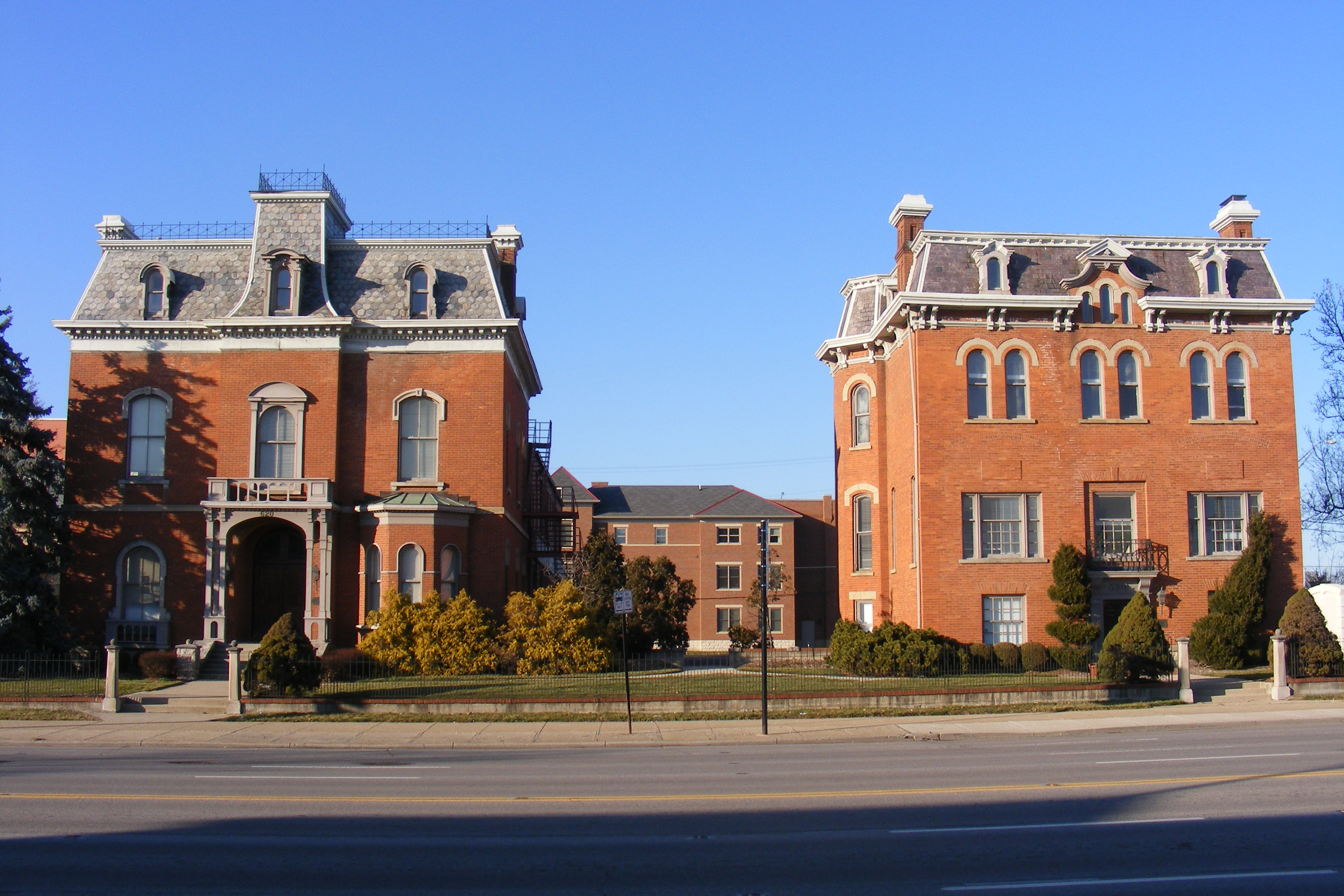
- Interactive map pinpointing the buildings
- Location: 620 and 630 E. Broad St., Columbus, Ohio
- Coordinates: 39.964437°N 82.983855°W, 39.964430°N 82.984172°W
- Built: 1871-72
- Architectural style: French Second Empire
- NRHP reference No.: 87000466
- Added to NRHP: March 13, 1987

The Ohio Farm Bureau Federation Offices are two historic buildings in Downtown Columbus, Ohio. The buildings were listed together on the National Register of Historic Places in 1987. They are located at the junction of Interstate 71 and Broad Street, a heavily trafficked area.

620 E. Broad was built for Benjamin Huntington, brother of the founder of Huntington Bancshares. 630 E. Broad was built for Andrew Denny Rogers, locally known as the founder of the Columbus Club and the Columbus Consolidated Street Railway Co. In the 1920s, the buildings became home to the offices of the Ohio Farm Bureau Federation, an organization that Nationwide Insurance was born from.

== See also ==
- National Register of Historic Places listings in Columbus, Ohio
