= Franklinton Apartments at Broad and Hawkes =

- U.S. National Register of Historic Places
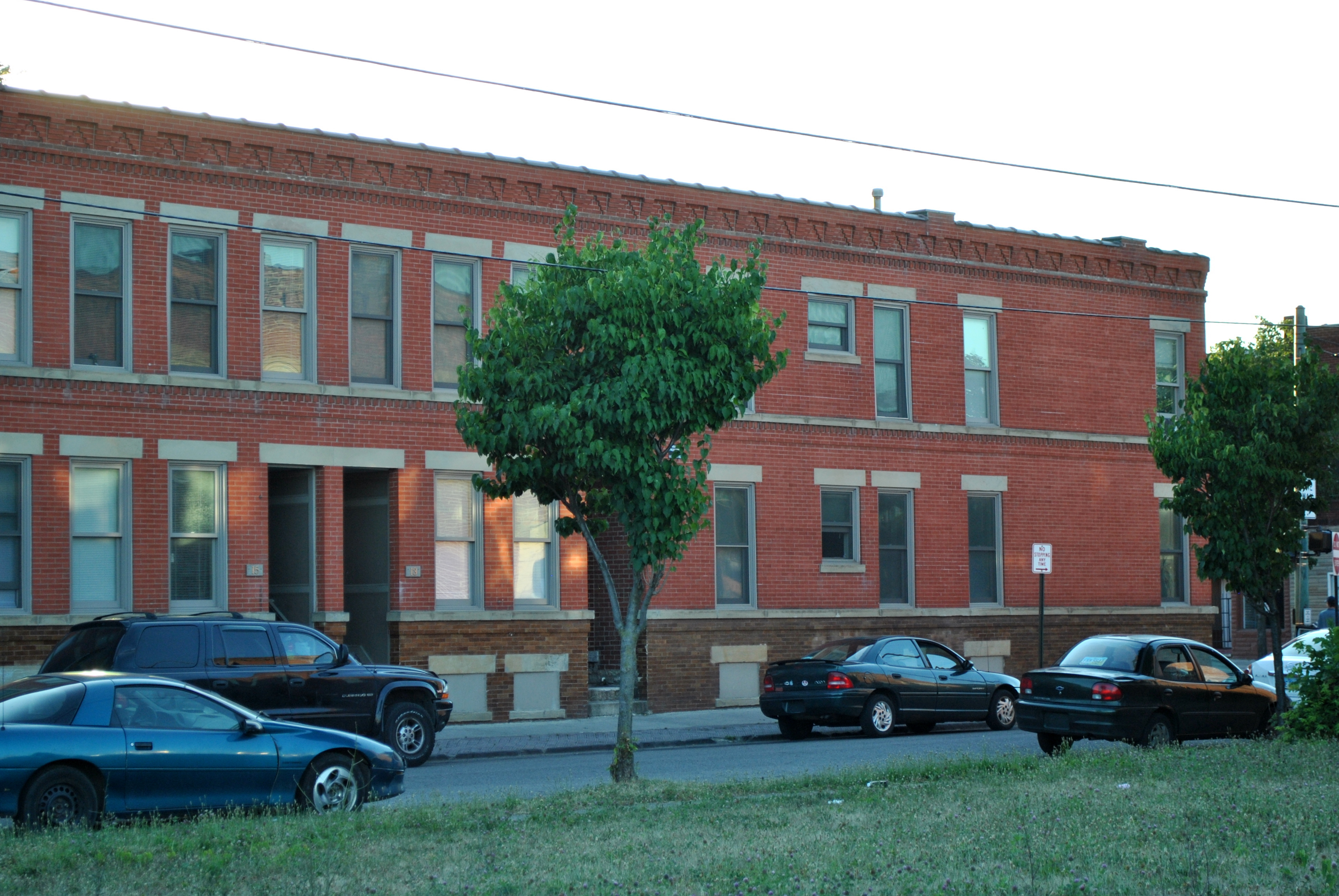
- Interactive map highlighting the building's location
- Location: 949-957 W. Broad St., 13-23 Hawkes Ave., Columbus, Ohio
- Coordinates: 39.958940°N 83.026010°W
- Built: 1900
- NRHP reference No.: 05000028
- Added to NRHP: April 22, 2005

The Franklinton Apartments at Broad and Hawkes are a set of historic buildings in the Franklinton neighborhood of Columbus, Ohio. The buildings were built in 1900 and listed on the National Register of Historic Places in 2005. The rowhouse buildings are on West Broad Street, in the commercial center of the neighborhood. The two buildings are in an L-shaped plan and contain 22 apartments. The buildings are significant as they represent the neighborhood's residential investment following an industrial boom. They are one set of four L-shaped corner rowhouses built in Franklinton in 1900, and another was built in 1910. It is a defined property type relatively unique to the neighborhood, with only one other known example elsewhere in the city.

== See also ==
- National Register of Historic Places listings in Columbus, Ohio
