= Carrie Lovejoy House =

Historic house in Ohio, United States

- U.S. National Register of Historic Places
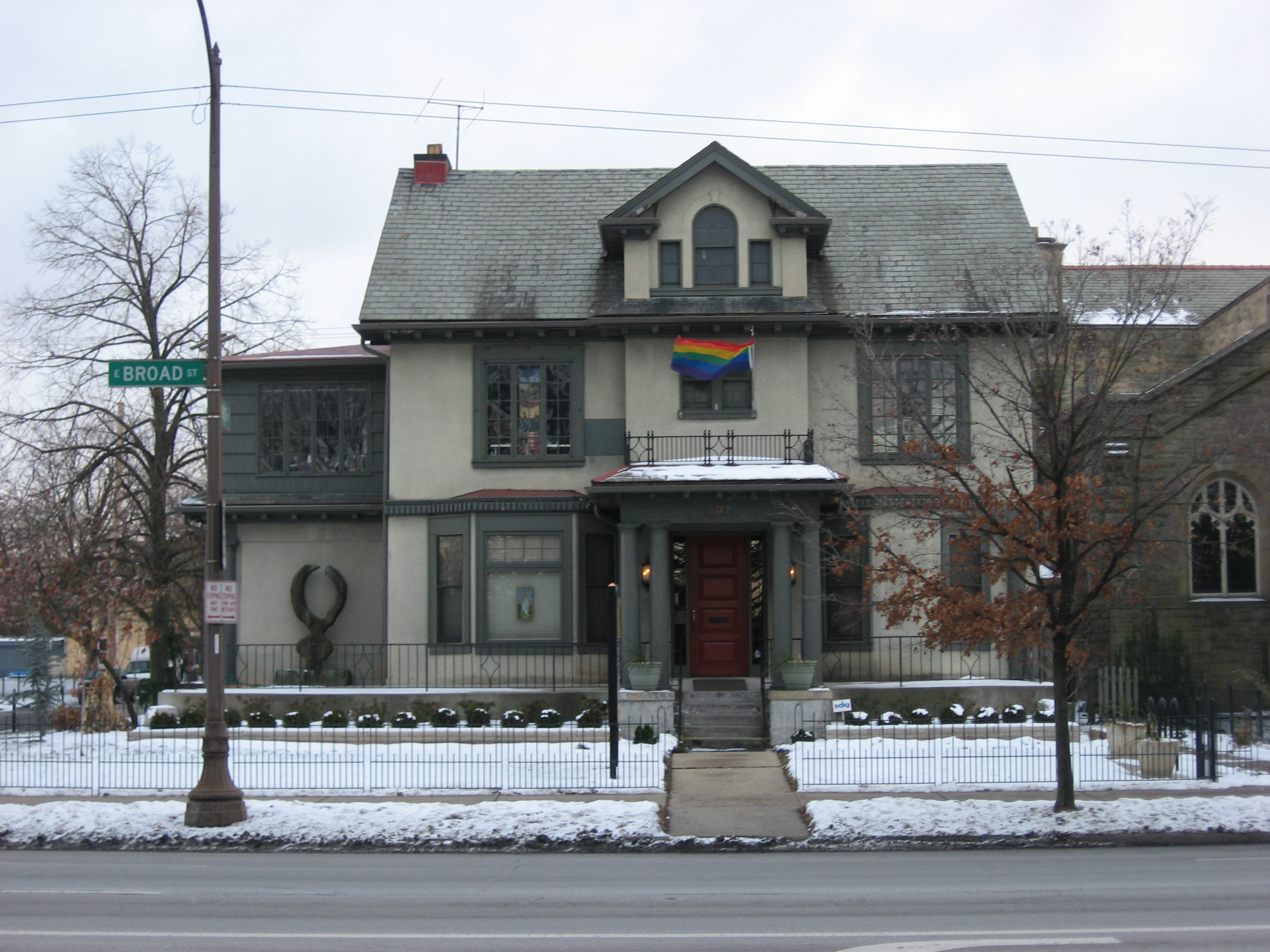
- Interactive map highlighting the building's location
- Location: 807 E. Broad St., Columbus, Ohio
- Coordinates: 39.964414°N 82.979201°W
- Built: c. 1900
- MPS: East Broad Street MRA
- NRHP reference No.: 86003435
- Added to NRHP: December 17, 1986

The Carrie Lovejoy House is a historic house in Columbus, Ohio, United States. The house was built c. 1900 and was listed on the National Register of Historic Places in 1986. The Carrie Lovejoy House was built at a time when East Broad Street was a tree-lined avenue featuring the most ornate houses in Columbus; the house reflects the character of the area at the time.

The house was built c. 1900 and designed with Colonial Revival influences. It was built for Carrie Lovejoy. Carrie and her husband Nathan had lived next-door, at 805 E. Broad, until his death in 1904. At this time, Carrie moved into the 807 address, living there until 1914. Austin McElroy subsequently lived there, until 1918, followed by F.W. Freeman.

== See also ==
- National Register of Historic Places listings in Columbus, Ohio
