= Prentiss-Tulford House =

Historic house in Ohio, United States

- U.S. National Register of Historic Places
- The house in 1981
- Interactive map highlighting the building's location
- Location: 1074 E. Broad St., Columbus, Ohio
- Coordinates: 39.965774°N 82.972310°W
- Built: c. 1890s
- Architectural style: Queen Anne
- MPS: East Broad Street MRA
- NRHP reference No.: 86003413
- Added to NRHP: December 17, 1986

The Prentiss-Tulford House was a historic house in Columbus, Ohio, United States. The house was built in the 1890s and was listed on the National Register of Historic Places in 1986. The Prentiss-Tulford House was built at a time when East Broad Street was a tree-lined avenue featuring the most ornate houses in Columbus; the house reflected the character of the area at the time.

The house was built in the 1890s and designed with classical and Queen Anne influences. S.G. Prentiss, assistant cashier for the Hayden-Clinton National Bank, lived there from 1910 to 1914.

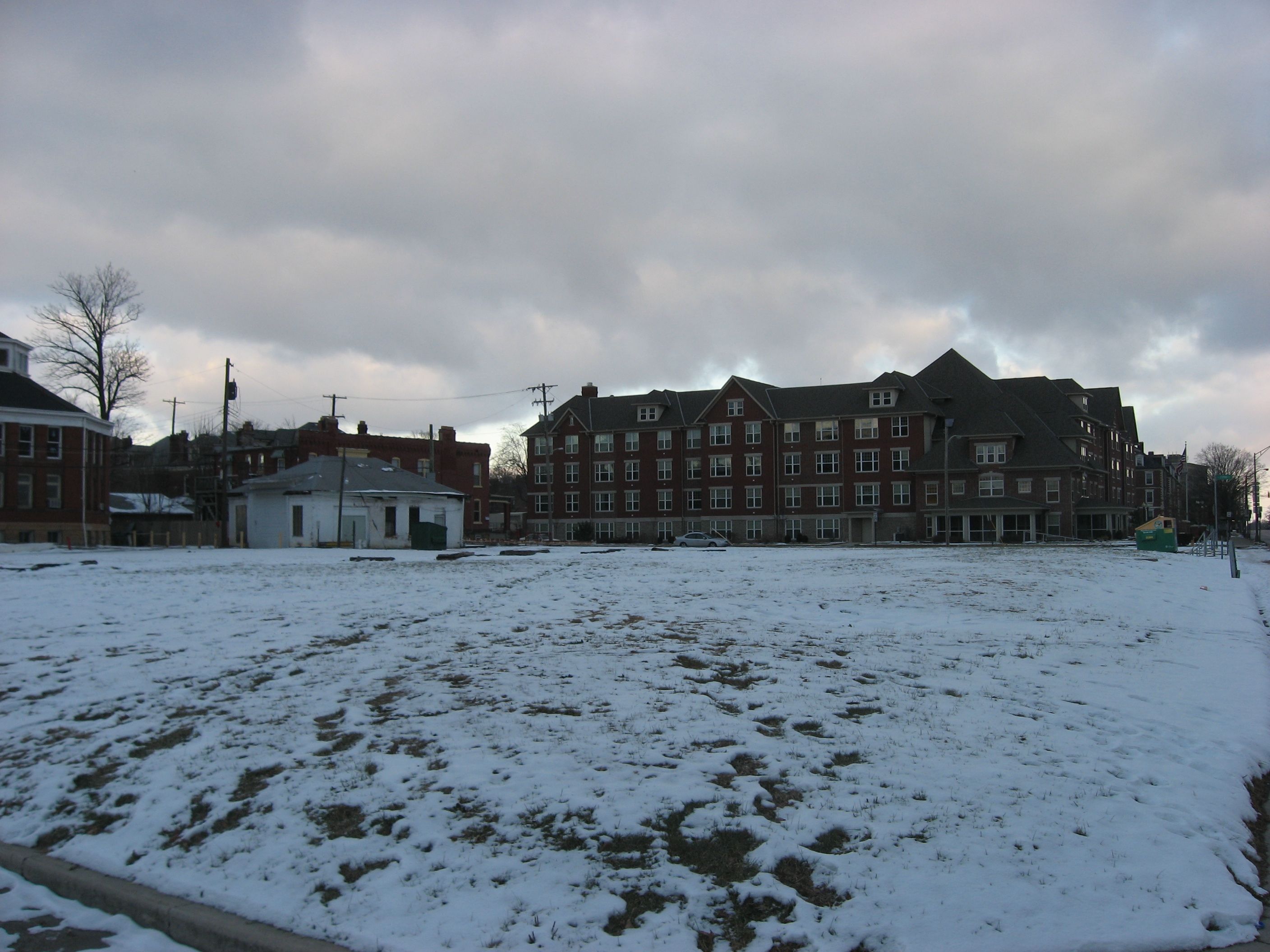
Present-day site of the house, 2010

== See also ==
- National Register of Historic Places listings in Columbus, Ohio
