= National Veterans Memorial and Museum =

Veterans museum in Columbus, Ohio

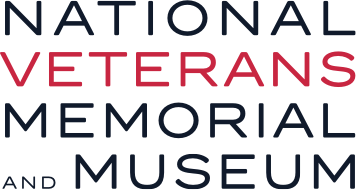

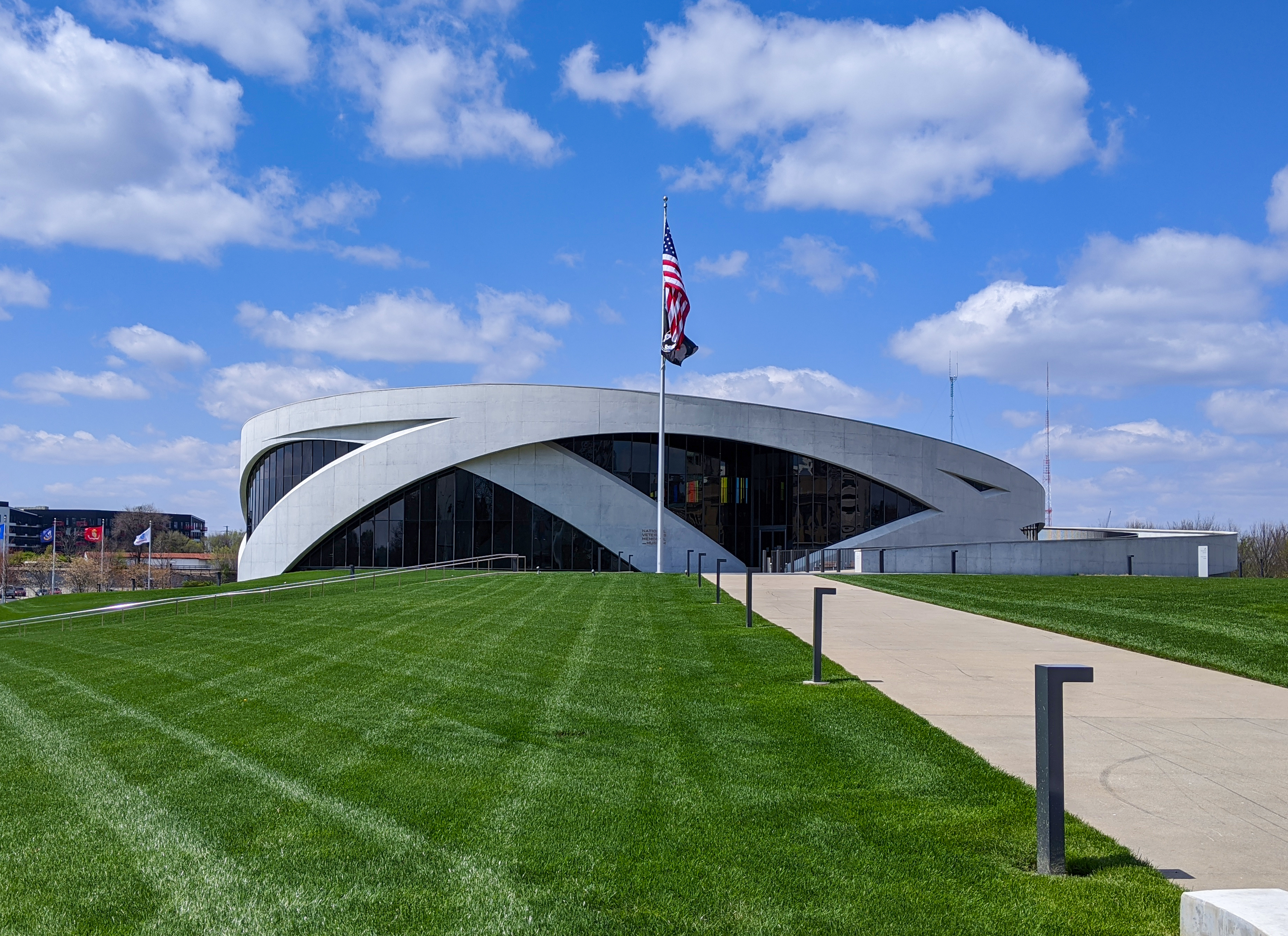
- Established: October 27, 2018
- Location: 300 W. Broad Street; Columbus, Ohio, United States
- Coordinates: 39°57′43″N 83°00′29″W
- Type: Veteran
- President: William J. Butler (acting)
- Architects: Allied Works Architecture, OLIN
- Public transit access: 10, 12; CoGo
- Parking: Surface lot
- Website: www.nationalvmm.org
- Interactive map highlighting the museum's location

U.S. National Memorial
- Designated: June 21, 2018

The National Veterans Memorial and Museum (NVMM) is the United States' national museum for veterans of the U.S. Armed Forces. The museum is located in Columbus, Ohio, along the Scioto River between Franklinton and Downtown Columbus. The museum's main focus is on the personal stories of U.S. veterans, in contrast to other war museums that are dedicated to the conflicts themselves. It opened on October 27, 2018, as a reimagining of the Franklin County Veterans Memorial, a museum dedicated to veterans from the surrounding county, established in 1955.

== History ==
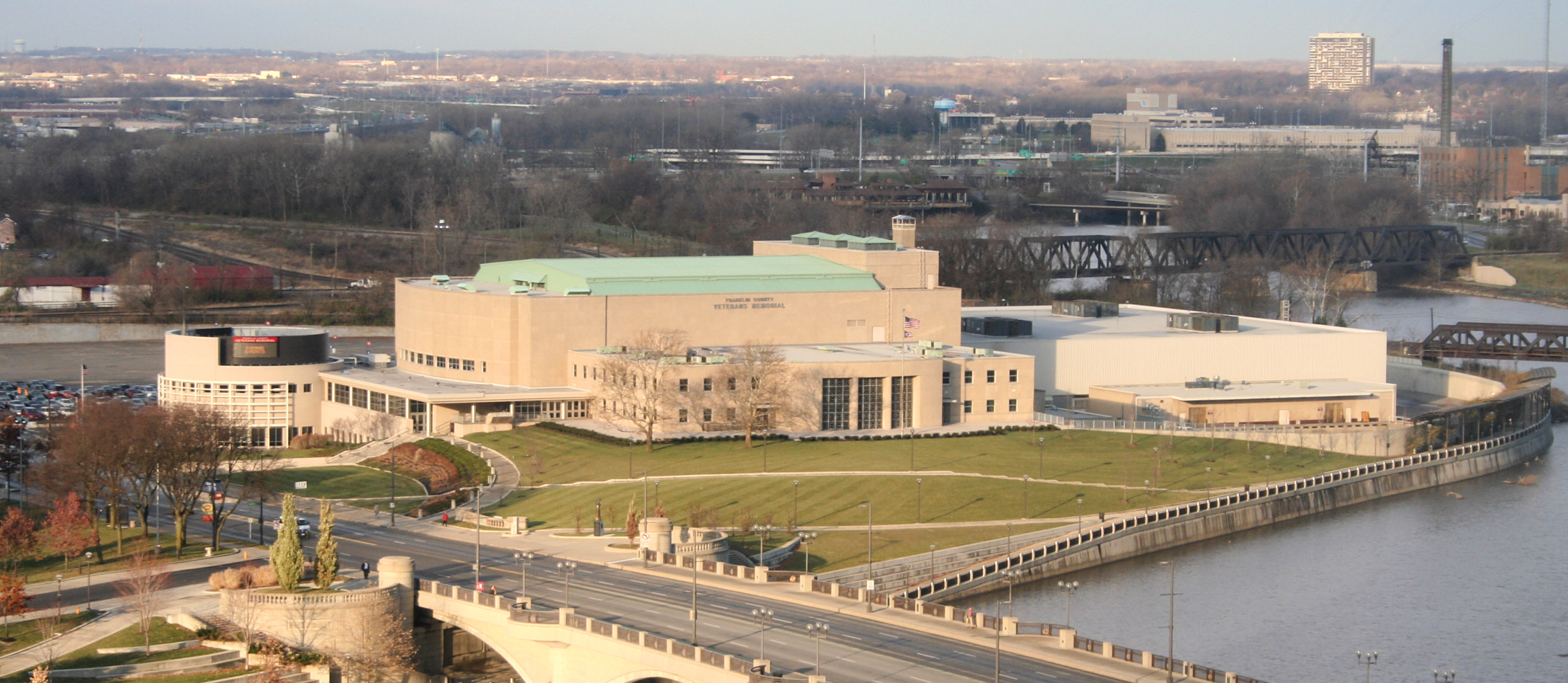
The former Franklin County Veterans Memorial in 2005. The current museum occupies the same location.

The site along the west side of the Scioto River near the Discovery Bridge on Broad Street was originally home to the Franklin County Veterans Memorial, which originally opened in 1955 and was demolished to make way for the museum in early 2015, by S.G. Loewendick & Sons. The construction of a veterans museum was envisioned by city boosters and received support from former Senator and World War II veteran John Glenn.

It was designated as the National Veterans Memorial and Museum by the United States Congress in June 2018. The museum was the 20th museum to receive national museum status from Congress.

It was dedicated on October 27, 2018, with a speech by former general Colin Powell.

== Architecture ==
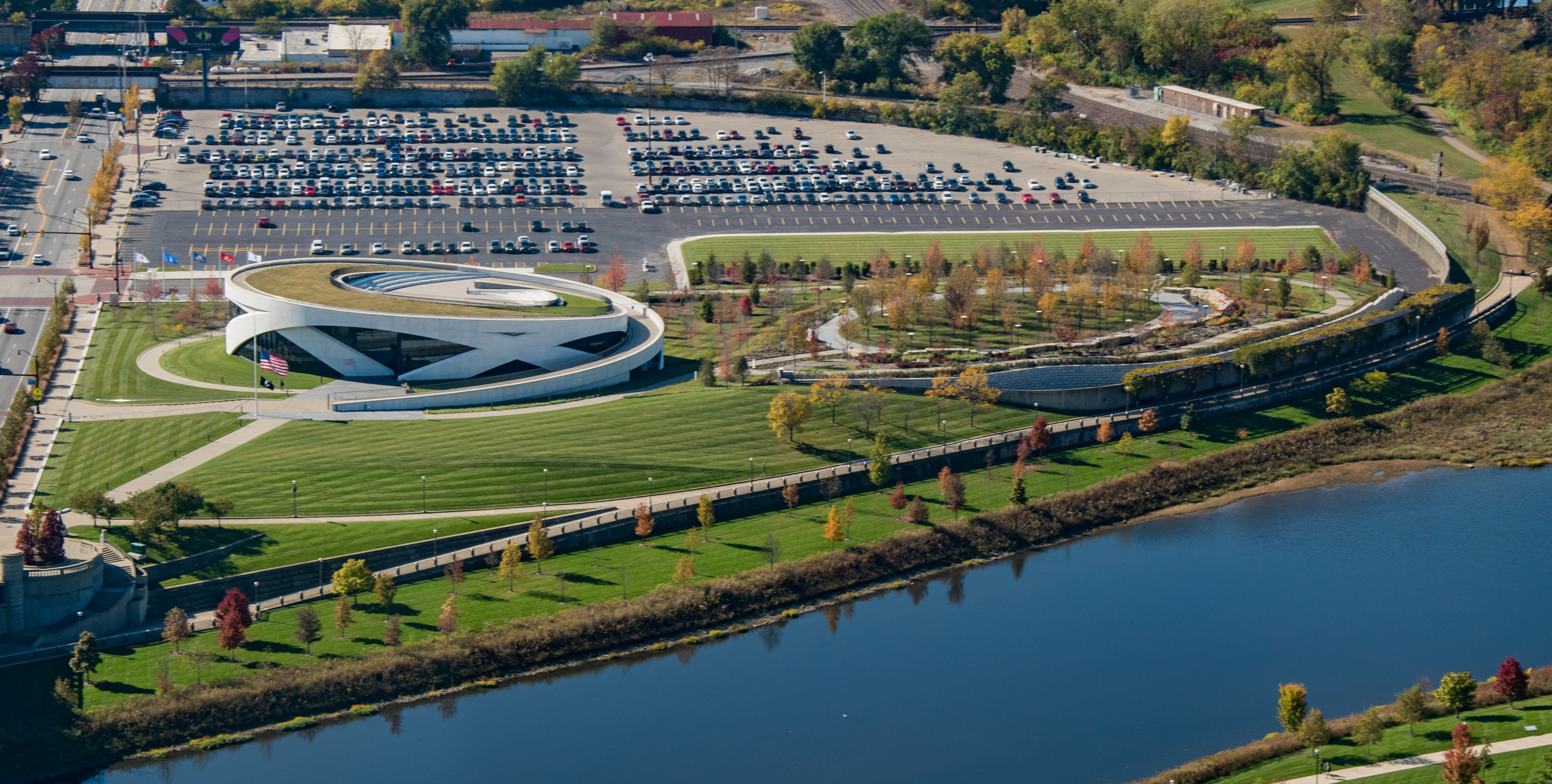
The museum, grounds, and parking

The 53,000-square-foot (4,900 m^{2}) building was designed by Allied Works Architecture, and OLIN designed the landscape. The interior was designed by Ralph Appelbaum Associates. Turner Construction Company was the general contractor. The Associated General Contractors of America named it the most significant construction project of 2018 and the best new building $10 to $75 million. The building and its park space cost $75 million, while an additional $7 million was raised for the museum's startup and operation.

The building is rounded, 300 feet in diameter, with a minimalist interior. Full-length windows on the mezzanine are vertically striped to resemble military ribbons. Visitors can walk atop the museum's grassy roof for views of the Columbus skyline and a place to reflect.

The museum includes a 2.5 acre outdoor memorial grove that includes a reflecting pool and memorial stone wall. The stated purpose of the architecture is to promote remembrance.

== Exhibits and collections ==
The museum focuses on the stories of veterans and individuals rather than military accomplishments, with the mission to "honor, inspire, connect, and educate". It has two permanent exhibits and one temporary exhibit space, covering 30,000 square feet. The museum houses personal artifacts such as footlockers, military ribbons, and letters service men and women sent home. Exhibits include stories from veterans dating from American Revolutionary War onwards to recent conflicts. It intends to educate civilians about the diverse backgrounds veterans have and the roles they served in the military.

== Memorial Grove ==
Memorial Grove is a 2.5-acre (1.0 ha) park outside the museum. The park opened alongside the museum in October 2018. It features a path circling a 325-foot wall of stacked rocks and waterfalls; the wall reads "E pluribus unum". The central shaded area, planted with American elms, is meant for personal reflection and contemplation.

== See also ==
- List of national memorials of the United States
