= House at 753 East Broad Street =

Historic house in Ohio, United States

- U.S. National Register of Historic Places
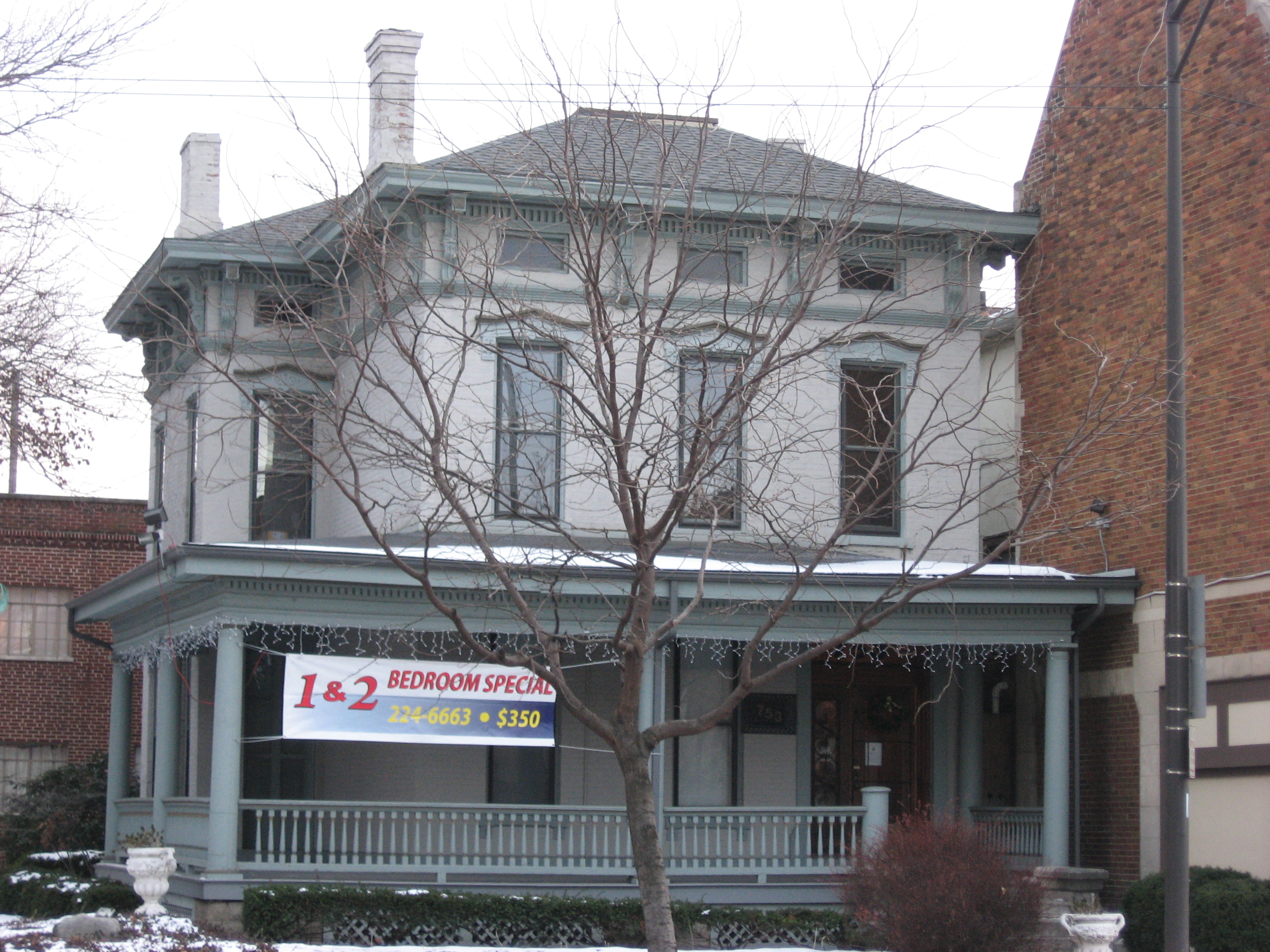
- Interactive map highlighting the building's location
- Location: 753 E. Broad St., Columbus, Ohio
- Coordinates: 39.964287°N 82.980474°W
- Built: c. 1870
- MPS: East Broad Street MRA
- NRHP reference No.: 86003425
- Added to NRHP: December 17, 1986

The House at 753 East Broad Street is a historic house in Columbus, Ohio, United States. The house was built c. 1870 and was listed on the National Register of Historic Places in 1986. It was built at a time when East Broad Street was a tree-lined avenue featuring the most ornate houses in Columbus; the house reflects the character of the area at the time.

== See also ==
- National Register of Historic Places listings in Columbus, Ohio
