= Central Assurance Company =

- U.S. National Register of Historic Places
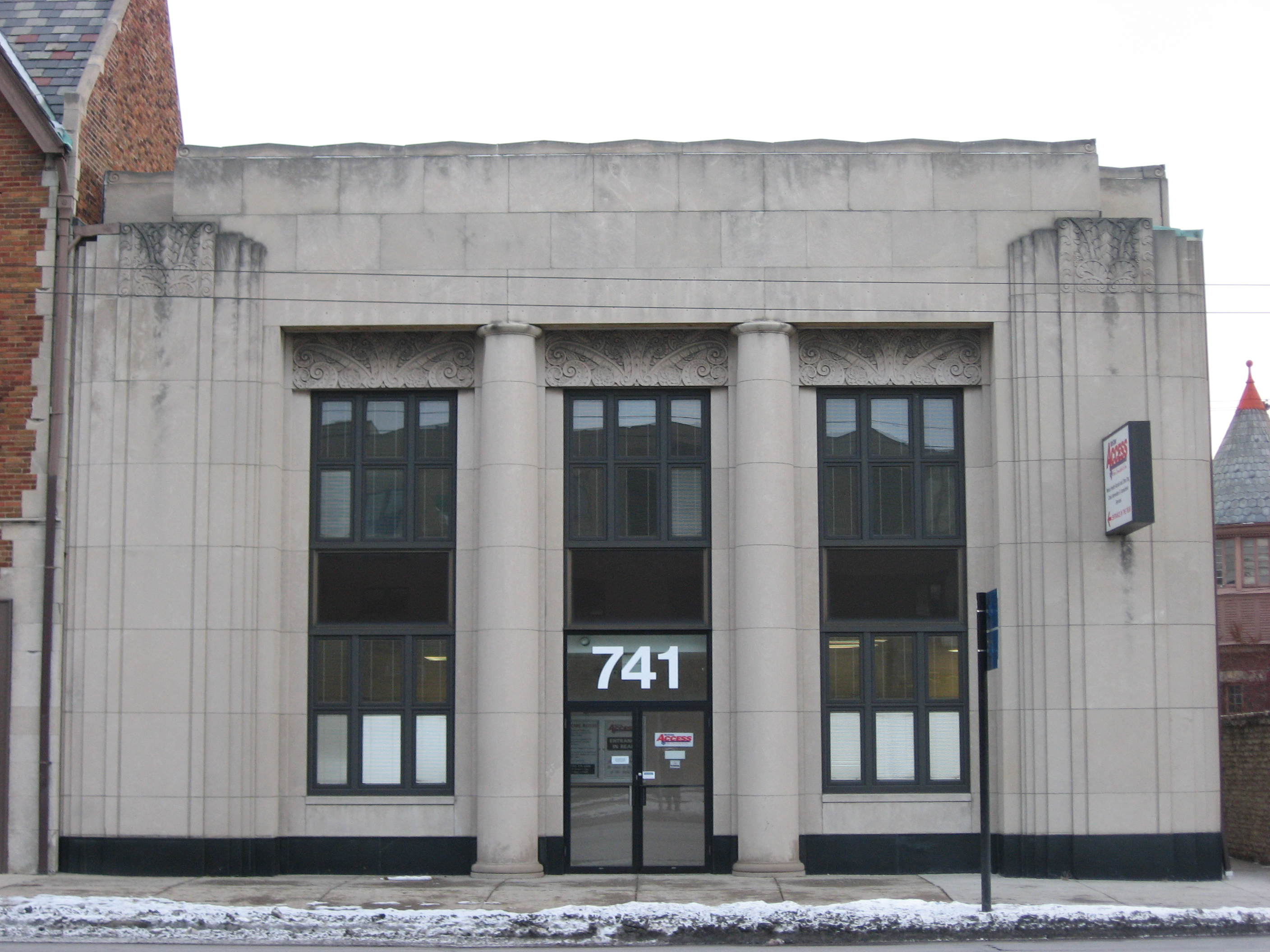
- Exterior in 2010
- Interactive map highlighting the building's location
- Location: 741 E. Broad St., Columbus, Ohio
- Coordinates: 39.964167°N 82.981111°W
- Built: 1942
- Architectural style: Art Deco
- MPS: East Broad Street MRA
- NRHP reference No.: 86003421
- Added to NRHP: December 19, 1986

The Central Assurance Company is a historic building in Columbus, Ohio. It was built in 1942 and listed as part of the E. Broad St. Multiple Resources Area on the National Register of Historic Places in 1986. It is significant for its Art Deco architecture, one of few remaining commercial buildings in the style in Columbus.

== See also ==
- National Register of Historic Places listings in Columbus, Ohio
