= Saint Paul's Episcopal Church (Columbus, Ohio) =

Historic church in Ohio, United States

- U.S. National Register of Historic Places
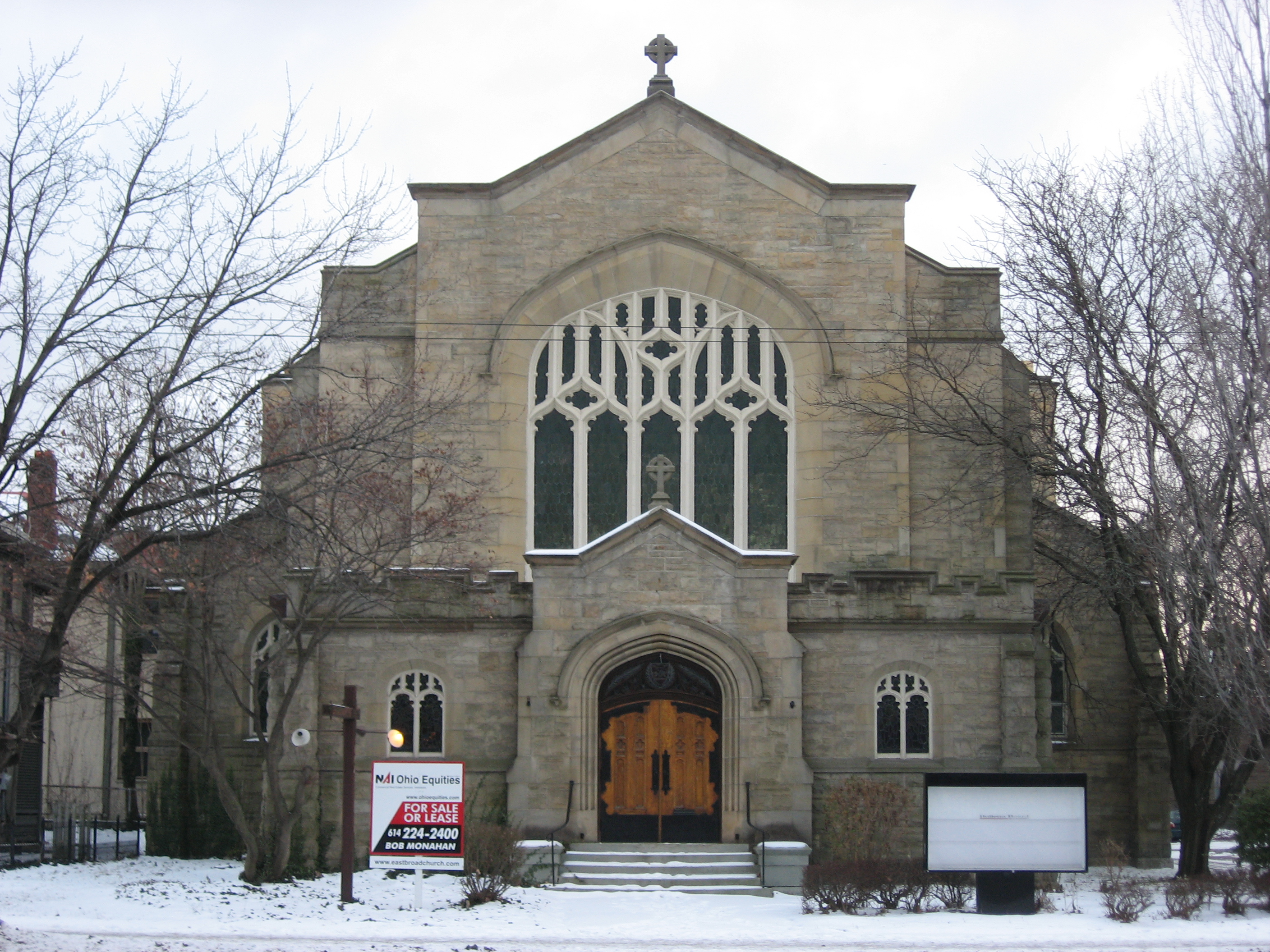
- Front of the building in 2010
- Interactive map highlighting the church's location
- Location: 787 E. Broad St., Columbus, Ohio
- Coordinates: 40°3′16″N 82°58′56″W
- Area: less than 1 acre (0.40 ha)
- Built: 1903
- Architectural style: Late Gothic Revival
- MPS: East Broad Street MRA (64000619)
- NRHP reference No.: 86003430
- Added to NRHP: 17 December 1986

Saint Paul's Episcopal Church is a historic building in Columbus, Ohio.

== Description and history ==
Built in 1903, it served as an Episcopal church in the past. It is an example of Late Gothic Revival style architecture. The large stone building displays simple massing, buttresses and cut stone detailing that exemplifies that style. On the south facade the arched entry, in a projecting bay, is echoed by the large sanctuary window. This fenestration features a Tudor arch and extensive tracery. The building is located at 787 E. Broad Street. The stone building is the second church built by the local Episcopalian congregation. It was listed on the National Register of Historic Places on December 17, 1986, as part of a group of properties, the "East Broad Street Multiple Resource Area".

== See also ==
- History of Ohio
- History of religion in the United States
- National Register of Historic Places listings in Columbus, Ohio
