= Garfield-Broad Apartments =

- U.S. National Register of Historic Places
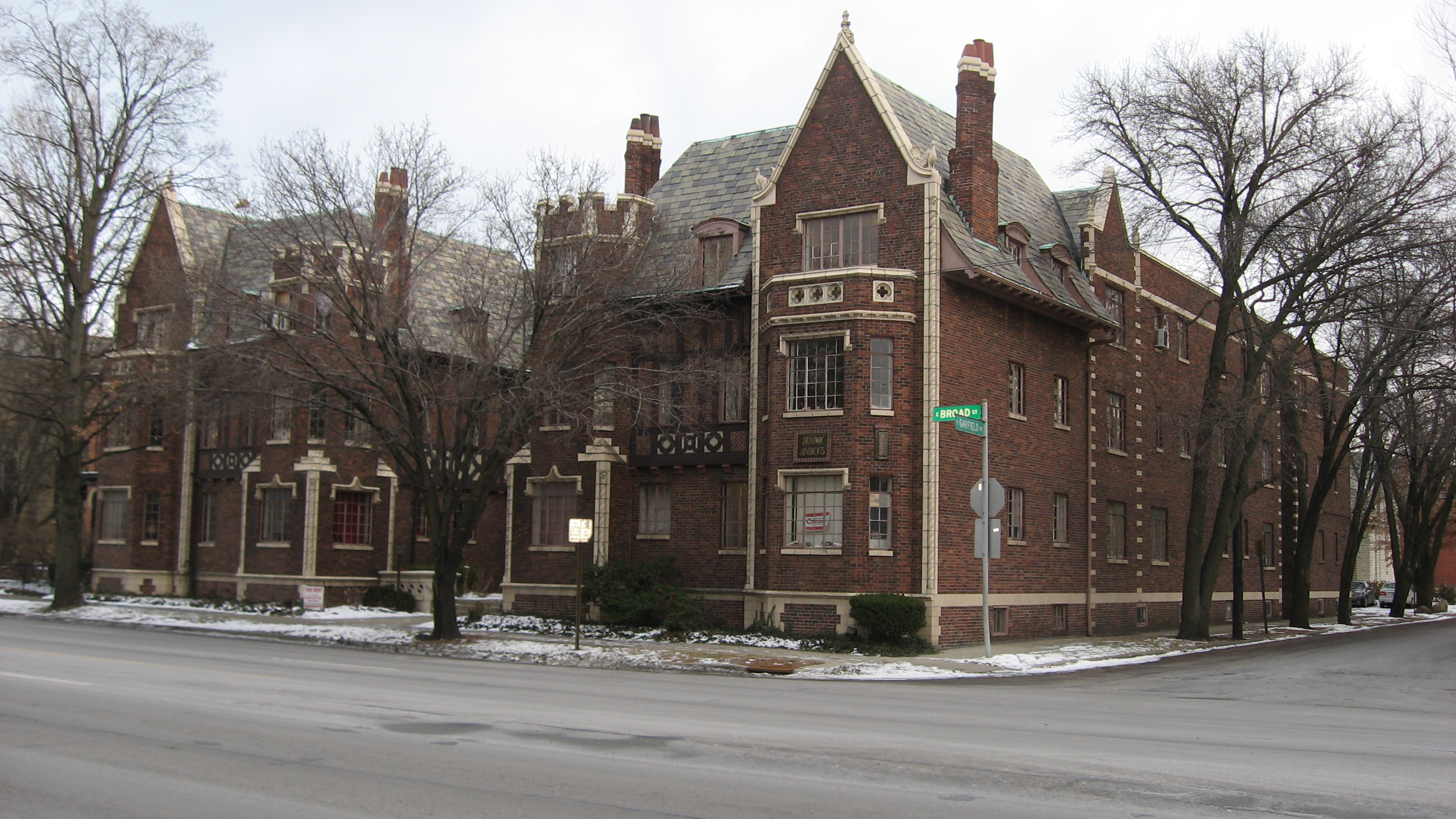
- Interactive map highlighting the building's location
- Location: 775 E. Broad St., Columbus, Ohio
- Coordinates: 39.964255°N 82.979969°W
- Area: Less than one acre
- Built: 1929
- Architect: Galbreath & Leonard
- Architectural style: Jacobethan Revival
- MPS: East Broad Street MRA
- NRHP reference No.: 86003427
- Added to NRHP: December 16, 1986

The Garfield-Broad Apartments is a historic building in the Olde Towne East neighborhood of Columbus, Ohio. It was built in 1929 and added to the National Register of Historic Places in 1986.

The three-story building was designed as a luxury apartment complex of 49 units, within easy commuting distance of Downtown Columbus. The building is significant as a remaining early 20th century apartment building on East Broad Street, and for its Jacobethan Revival architecture. It features decorative brickwork, stucco, and half-timbering, along with elaborate stone decorations.

== See also ==
- National Register of Historic Places listings in Columbus, Ohio
