= Frank J. Kaufman House =

Historic house in Ohio, United States

- U.S. National Register of Historic Places
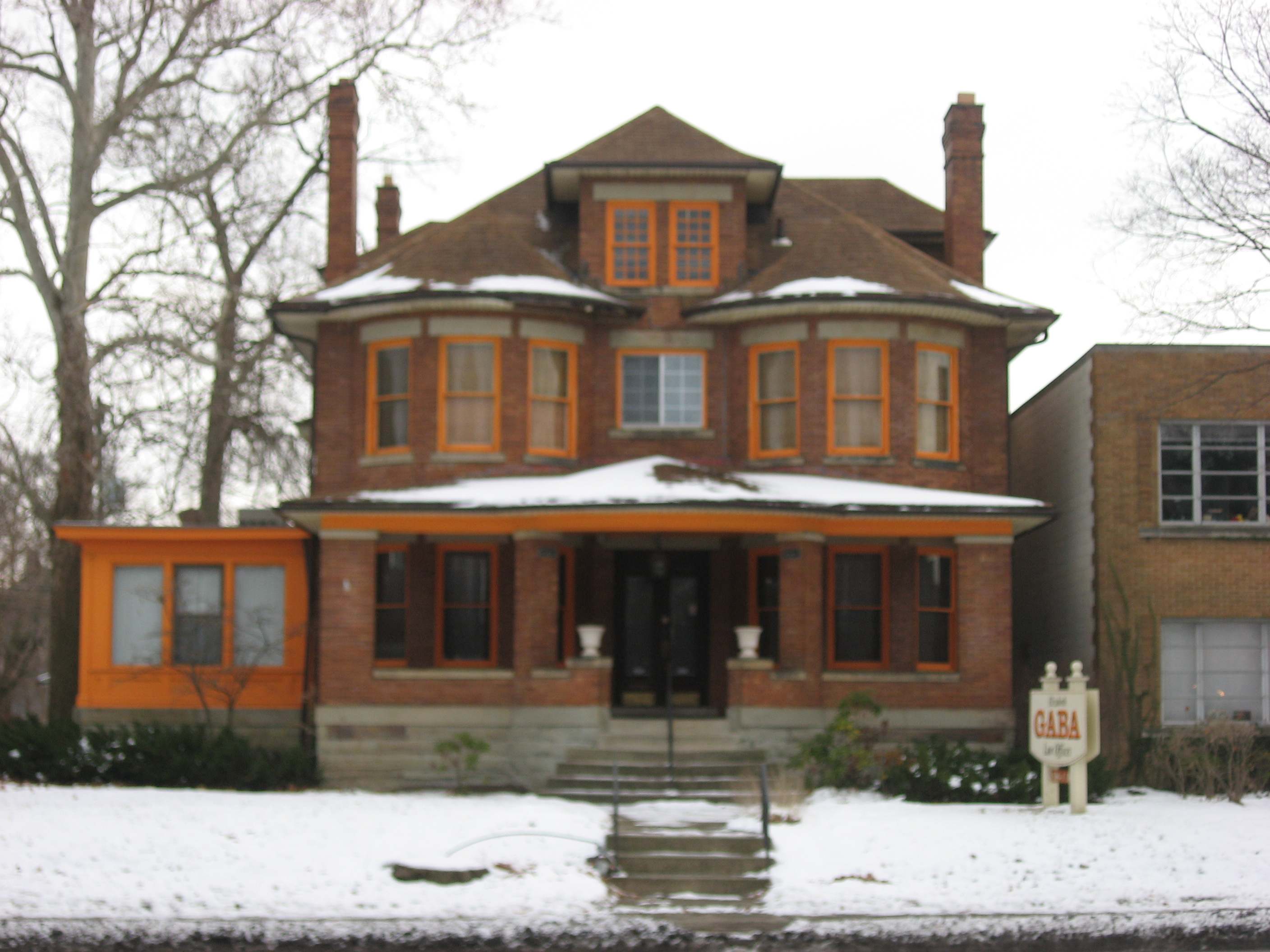
- Interactive map highlighting the building's location
- Location: 1231 E. Broad St., Columbus, Ohio
- Coordinates: 39.965713°N 82.967958°W
- Built: c. 1900
- Architectural style: Queen Anne
- MPS: East Broad Street MRA
- NRHP reference No.: 86003420
- Added to NRHP: December 17, 1986

The Frank J. Kaufman House is a historic house in Columbus, Ohio, United States. The house was built c. 1900 and was listed on the National Register of Historic Places in 1986. The Frank J. Kaufman House was built at a time when East Broad Street was a tree-lined avenue featuring the most ornate houses in Columbus; the house reflects the character of the area at the time.

The house was built c. 1900 and designed with Queen Anne influences. It was built for Frank J. Kaufman, a sales manager of the H.C. Godman Company. His family occupied the house until the 1940s.

== See also ==
- National Register of Historic Places listings in Columbus, Ohio
