= Joseph-Cherrington House =

Historic house in Ohio, United States

- U.S. National Register of Historic Places
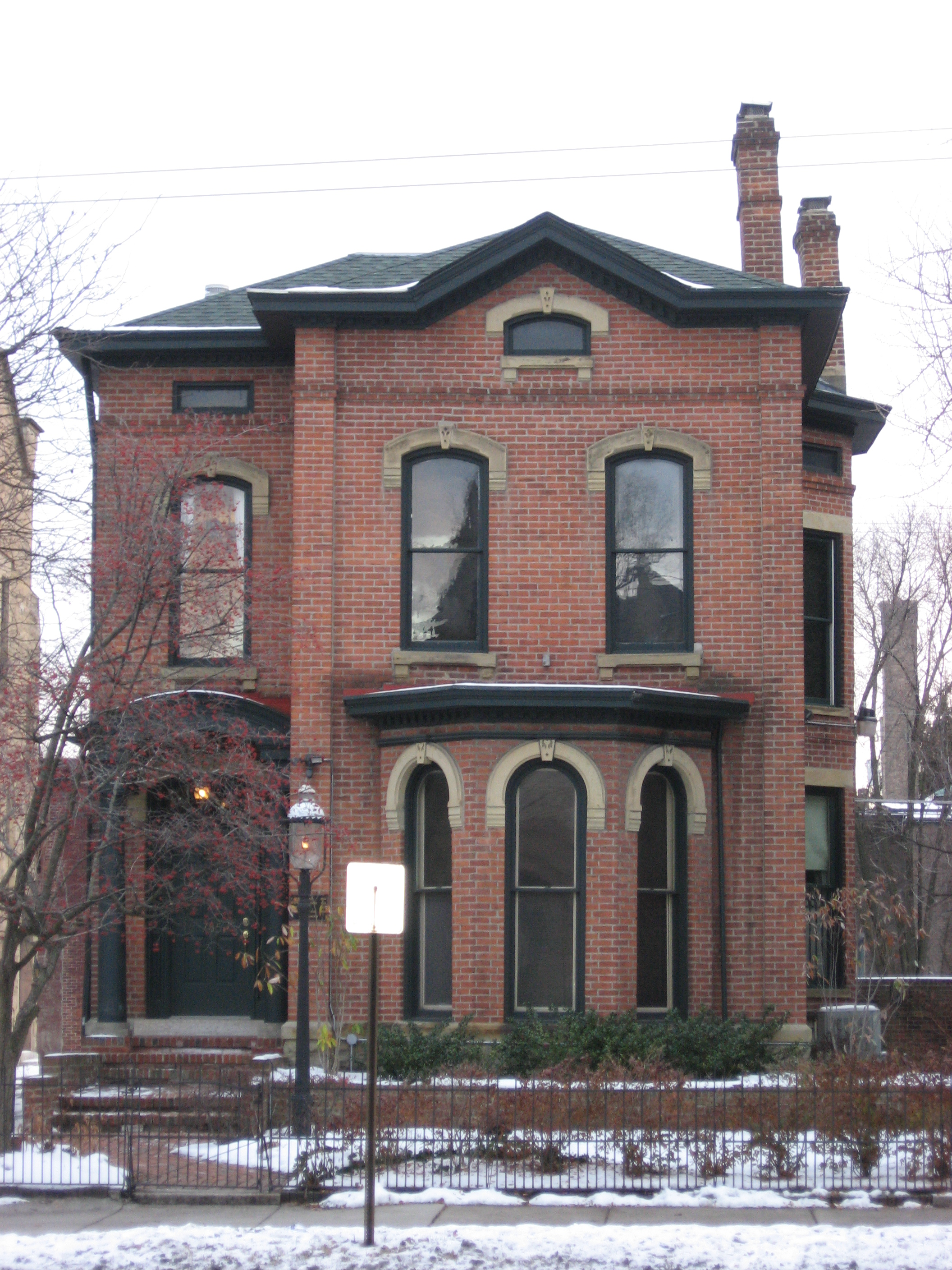
- Interactive map highlighting the building's location
- Location: 785 E. Broad St., Columbus, Ohio
- Coordinates: 39.964349°N 82.979678°W
- Built: 1863
- Architectural style: High Victorian, Italianate
- MPS: East Broad Street MRA
- NRHP reference No.: 86003429
- Added to NRHP: December 17, 1986

The Joseph-Cherrington House is a historic house in Columbus, Ohio, United States. The house was built in 1863 and was listed on the National Register of Historic Places in 1986. The Joseph-Cherrington House was built at a time when East Broad Street was a tree-lined avenue featuring the most ornate houses in Columbus; the house reflects the character of the area at the time.

The Joseph-Cherrington House was built in 1863, and is the second-oldest in the area of East Broad Street. The house is significant as the residence of the family of Wilden E. Joseph, part of the Patton Manufacturing Co. Subsequent residents included Harold Cherrington, from 1930 to 1964. Cherrington was a journalist and dramatic editor for the Columbus Dispatch.

== See also ==
- National Register of Historic Places listings in Columbus, Ohio
