= Columbus Country Club Mound =

Native American burial mound in Columbus, Ohio

- U.S. National Register of Historic Places
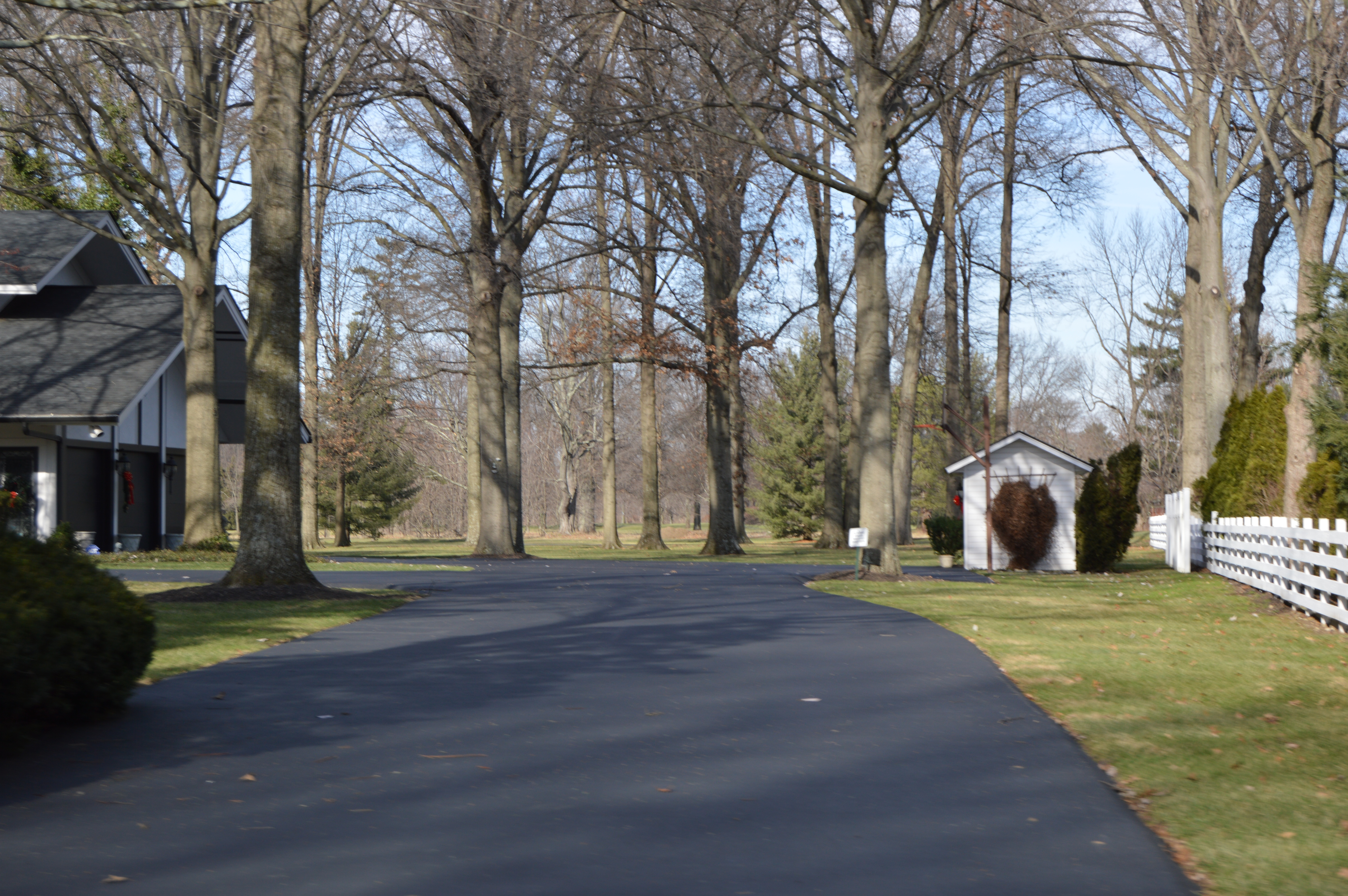
- Interactive map pinpointing the mound's location
- Location: 4831 E. Broad St., Columbus, Ohio
- Coordinates: 39.967851°N 82.860566°W
- Built: c. 1000 B.C. – 400 A.D.
- NRHP reference No.: 74001487
- Added to NRHP: February 15, 1974

The Columbus Country Club Mound is a Native American burial mound at the Columbus Country Club in Columbus, Ohio. The mound was created around 2,000 years ago by the Pre-Columbian Native American Adena culture. The site was added to the National Register of Historic Places in 1974.

Resources about the site, including its National Register of Historic Places nomination, are restricted under the Archaeological Resources Protection Act of 1979.

== See also ==
- National Register of Historic Places listings in Columbus, Ohio
