= Discovery Bridge (Columbus, Ohio) =

Overpass on the Scioto River

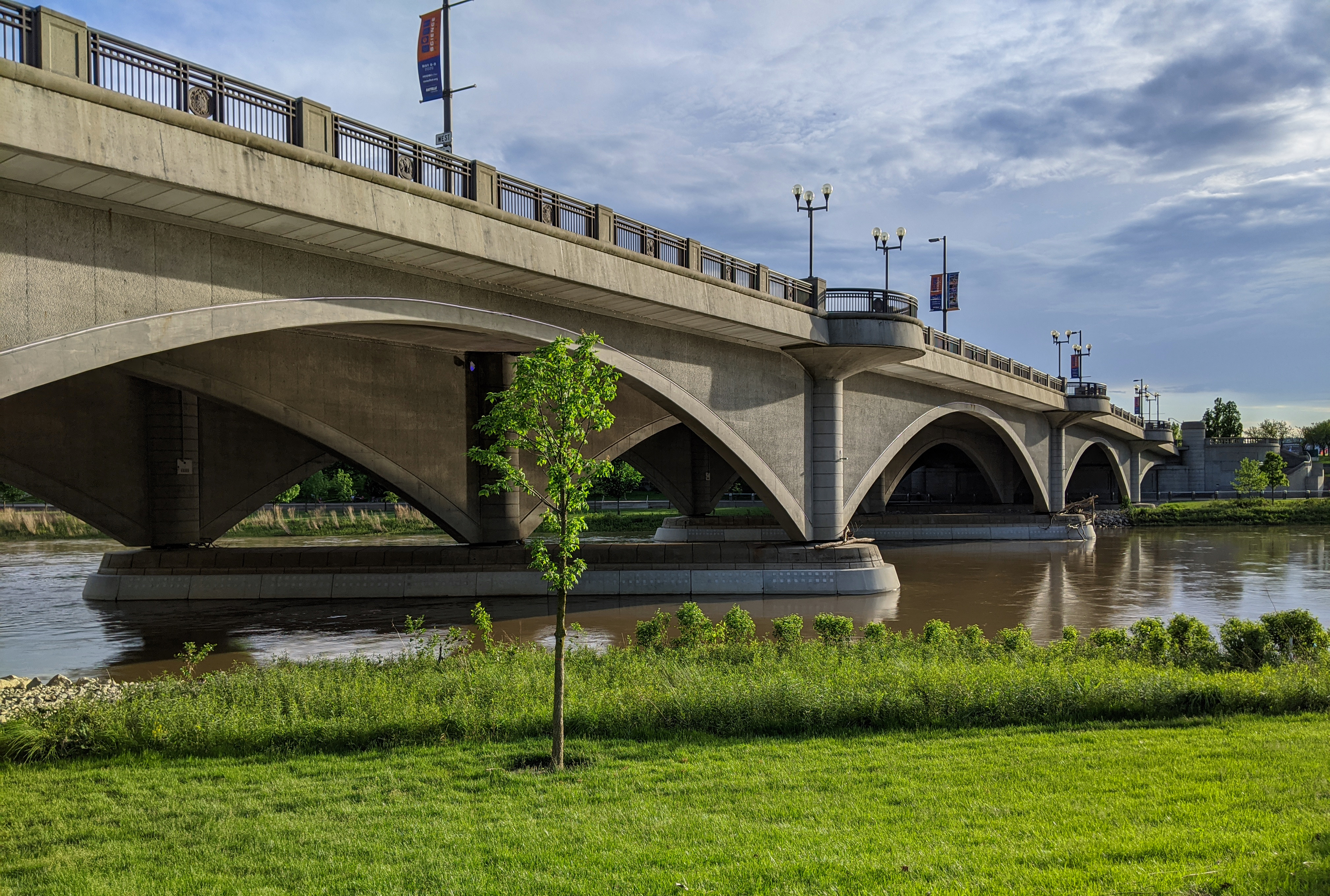
- Coordinates: 39°57′42″N 83°00′18″W
- Carries: US 40; 10, 12
- Crosses: Scioto River
- Locale: Columbus, Ohio
- Begins: Downtown
- Ends: Franklinton
- Official name: Broad Street Bridge

Characteristics
- No. of lanes: 2 eastbound, 2 westbound, 2 bicycle, 2 pedestrian

History
- Opened: 1816
- Rebuilt: 1834, 1883, 1921, 1990

Location
- Interactive map pinpointing the Discovery Bridge

The Discovery Bridge, commonly known as the Broad Street Bridge, is a bridge in Columbus, Ohio, United States, carrying Broad Street over the Scioto River and connecting Downtown Columbus to Franklinton. The bridge was named in reference to Christopher Columbus's "discovery" of the Americas; the bridge includes artistic bronze medallions featuring symbols of the explorer.

The bridge replaced several prior structures, including the Broad Street Bridge, extant from 1921 to 1990.

== Description ==
The Discovery Bridge carries Broad Street (U.S. Route 40) over the Scioto River, connecting Downtown Columbus to Franklinton.

== History ==
=== Prior structures ===
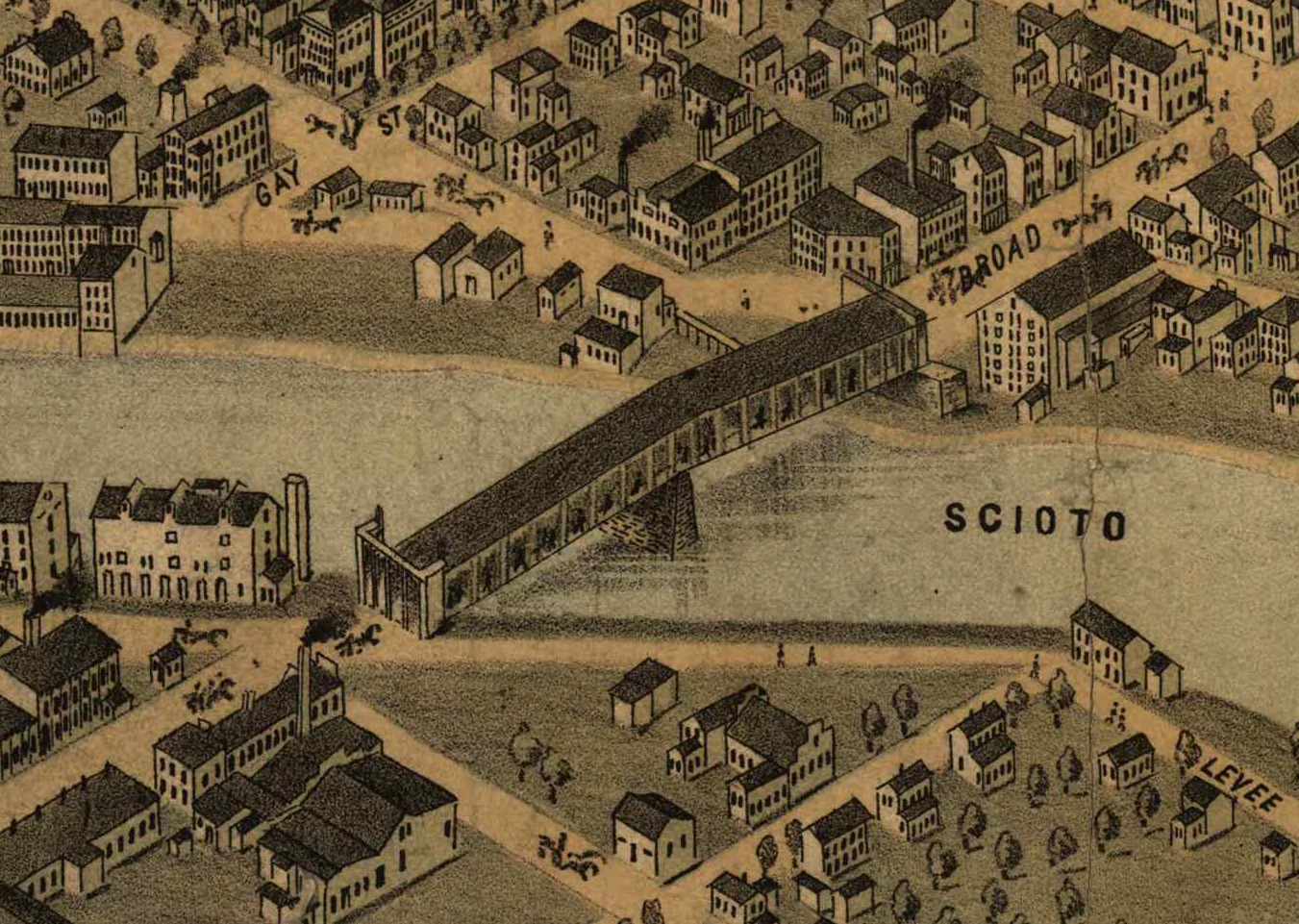
The 1834-built bridge, illustrated in 1872

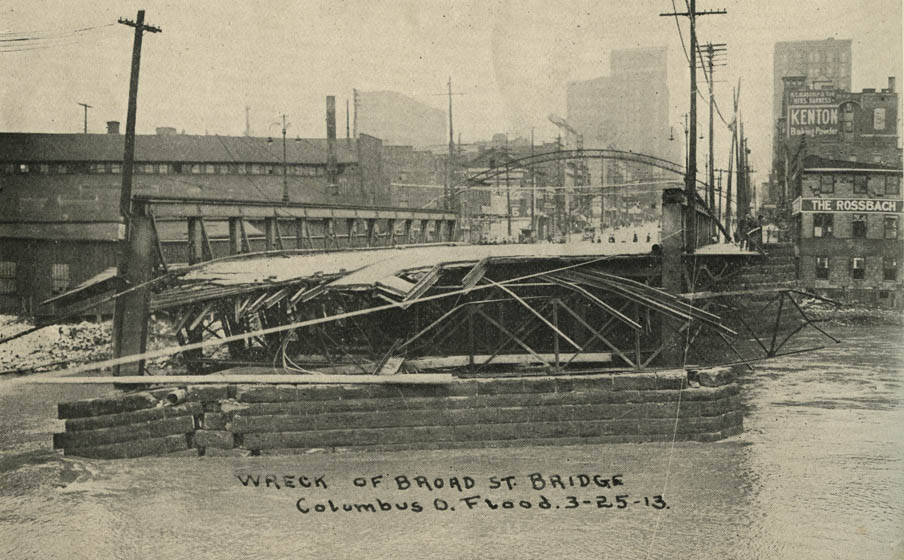
Wreck of the Broad Street Bridge after the 1913 flood

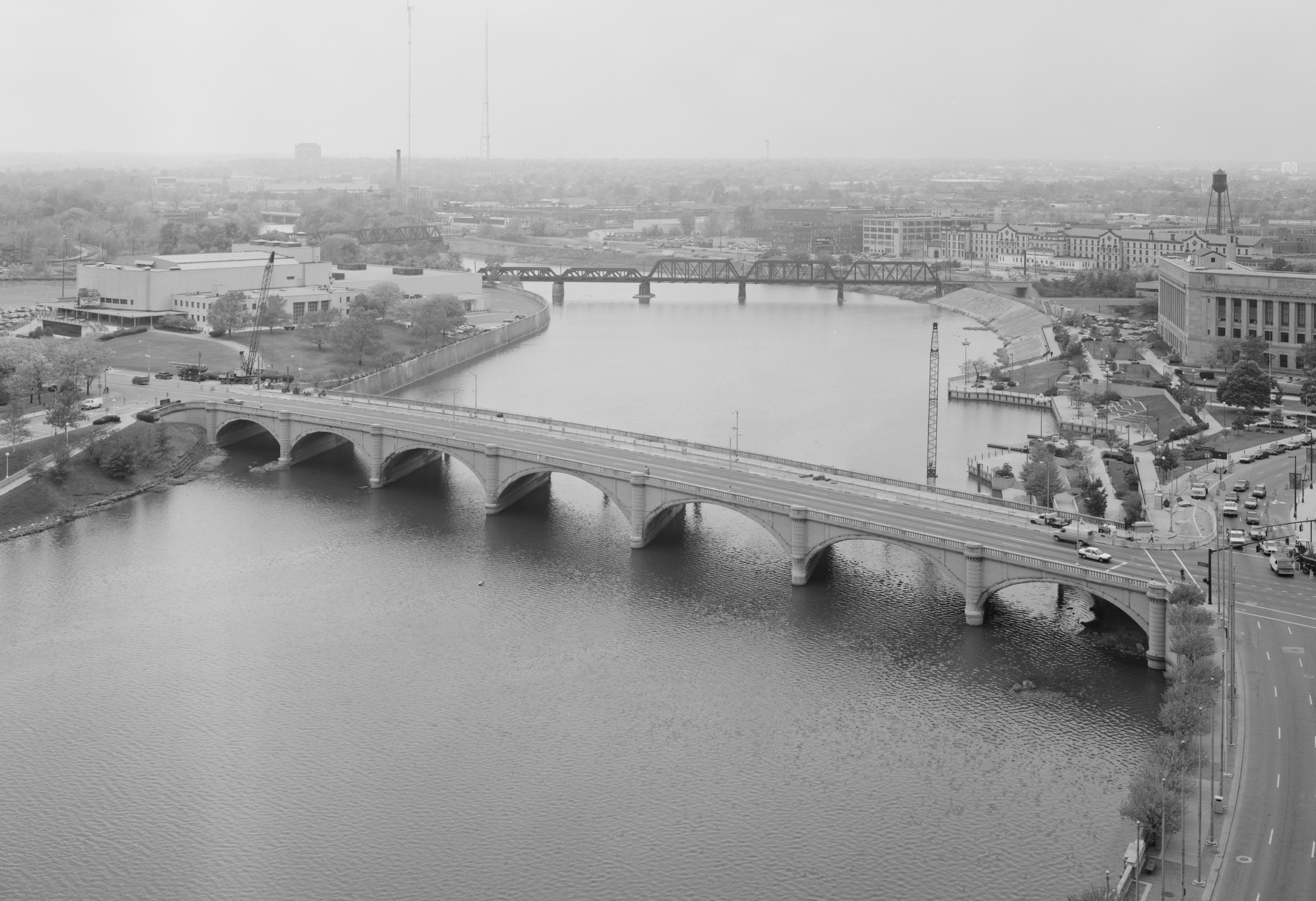
The 1921-built bridge in 1989

Franklinton was first laid out in 1779; Columbus followed 33 years later, in 1812. In that year, ferry service was established to allow increased traffic between the river's banks. In 1815, Ohio's assembly passed an act to allow Lucas Sullivant to build a bridge and collect tolls.

The roofless wooden toll bridge was built in 1816, the first bridge to cross the Scioto River in Columbus. In 1826 the bridge was replaced by a similar bridge, though it was washed away in an 1832 flood. A free public bridge was then slated to be built. During this time, a freshet washed away the temporary bridge in 1834.

The new permanent bridge built in 1834 was substantial, with two spans, separate tracks for vehicles and a sidewalk for pedestrians outside its covered vehicle lanes. It was made entirely of wood, and withstood numerous floods until it was replaced in 1883. The subsequent bridge, a two-span iron through-truss bridge, was four lanes wide, with cantilevered sidewalks; streetcar tracks were added later. The bridge was heavily damaged during the Great Flood of 1913 in Columbus but was restored to be used for a few more years.

A concrete arch bridge was constructed from May 1918 to October 1921. The bridge was one of three significant riverfront structures reconstructed following the flood, along with a floodwall and the Town Street Bridge. All three were designed by Braun, Fleming and Knollman in a classical style, complimenting the Ohio Statehouse. It was demolished in 1990, to be replaced with the current bridge. The 1921 bridge was part of the Scioto River Bridge Group, listed on the Columbus Register of Historic Properties in 1983 and proposed as part of the Columbus Civic Center Historic District, nominated to the National Register of Historic Places in 1988. The concrete arch bridge had seven spans of varying lengths and carried six lanes of traffic and two pedestrian sidewalks. Two of the traffic lanes were used for streetcar tracks. The bridge featured classical balustrade railings made of Indiana limestone.

=== Current bridge ===
The new bridge was designed by a team including Burgess & Niple, from Columbus; Harbeson, Hough, Livingston & Larson, from Philadelphia; and Leonhardt, Andra and Partner, from Stuttgart, West Germany. The structure opened to traffic on June 15, 1992 and its opening celebration was held on June 20 of that year.

The bridge was designed with strong columns, intended to hold works of public art. In 1994, the county engineer's office hoped for classical-style statues of heroic figures at each corner of the bridge. The Greater Columbus Arts Council began to host a competition for artwork at the site, and two finalists were selected in the mid-1990s. Both were funded to build scale models of their work; the more prominent of the two was by Columbus artist Todd Slaughter. Slaughter's work would have been a massive blue snake made of glass and metal. Its design would mirror the Serpent Mound, a well-known prehistoric mound built by pre-Columbian Native Americans in Ohio.

== Gallery ==
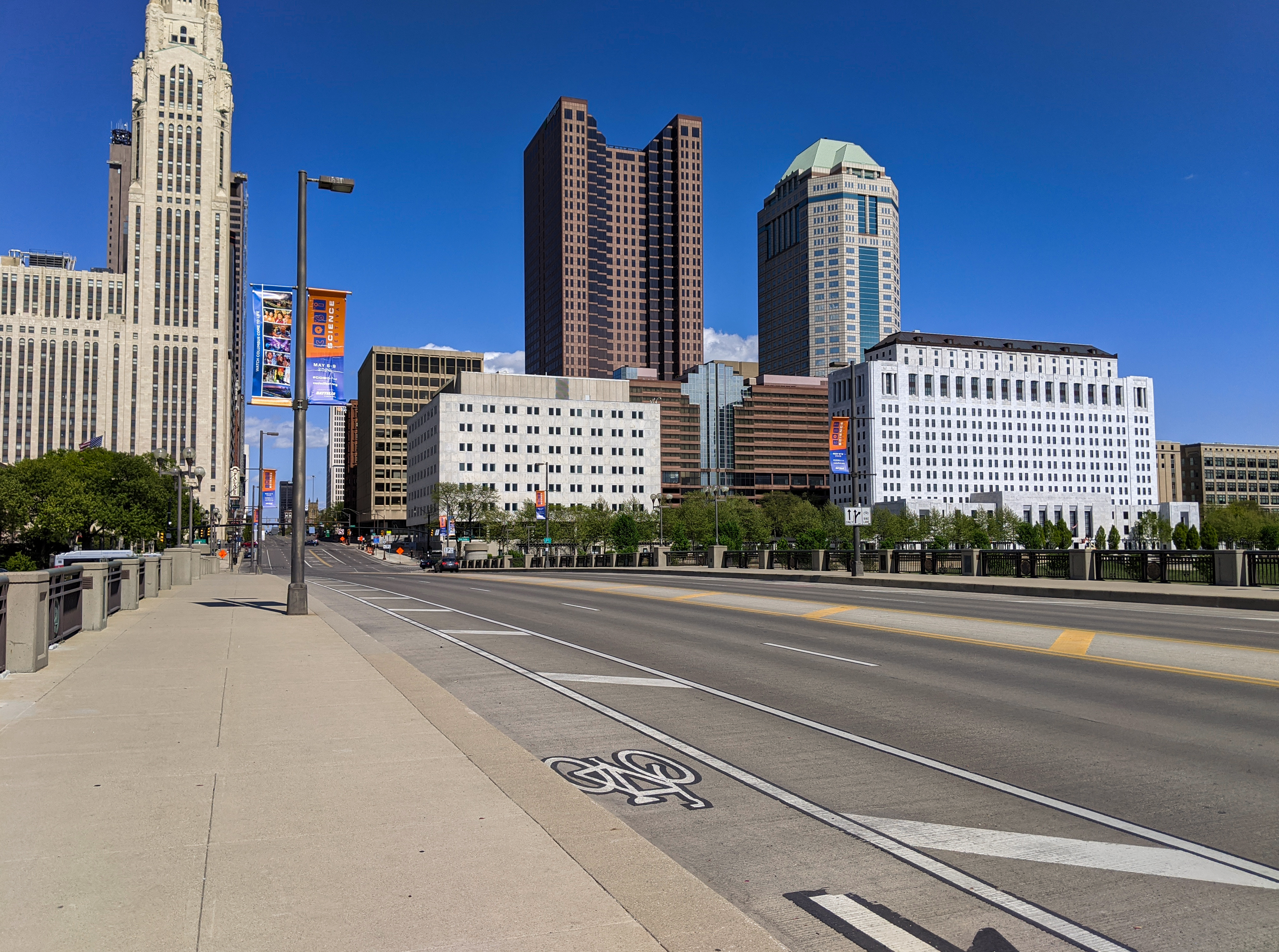
Roadbed

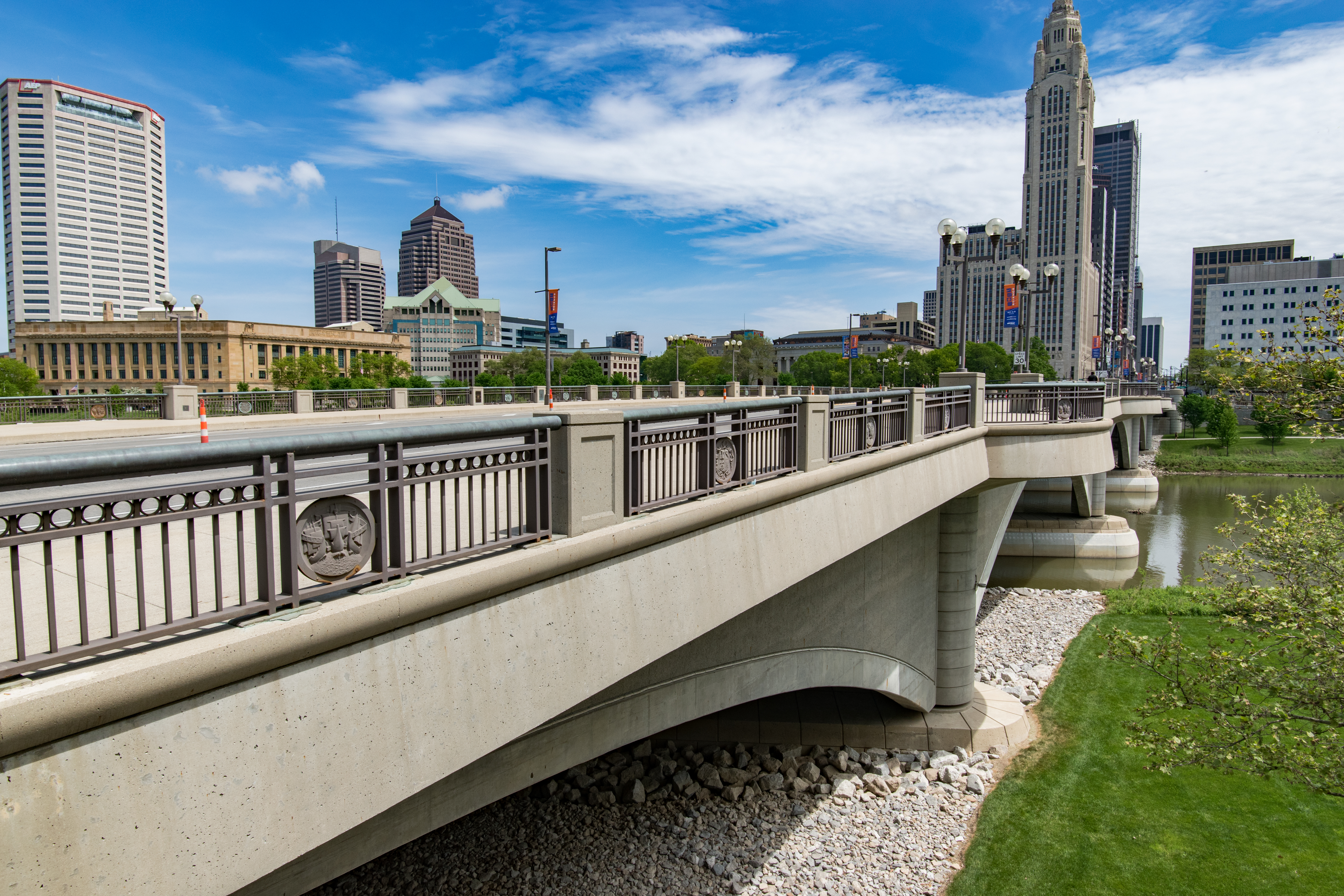
Railing

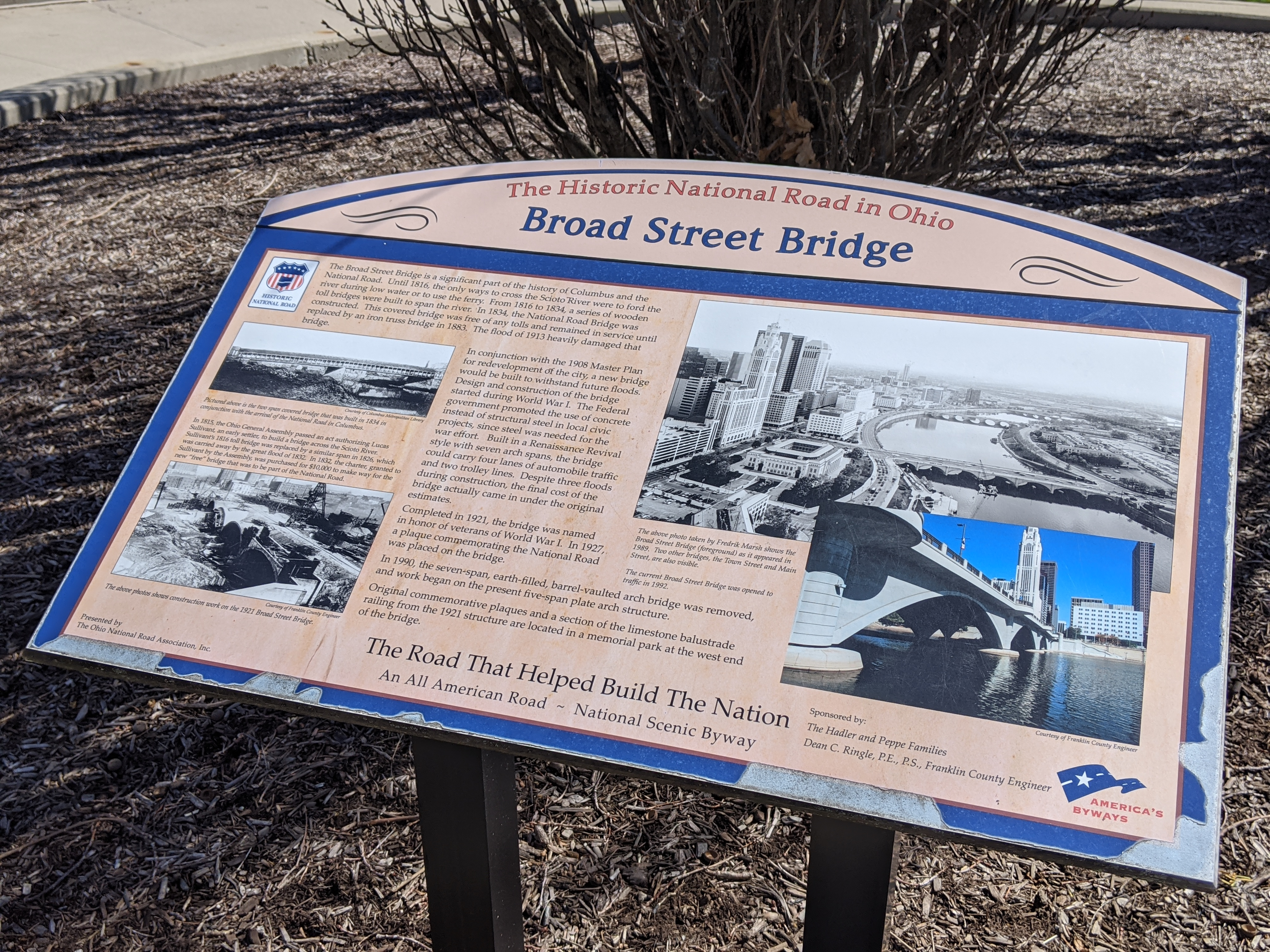
Historical plaque by the bridge

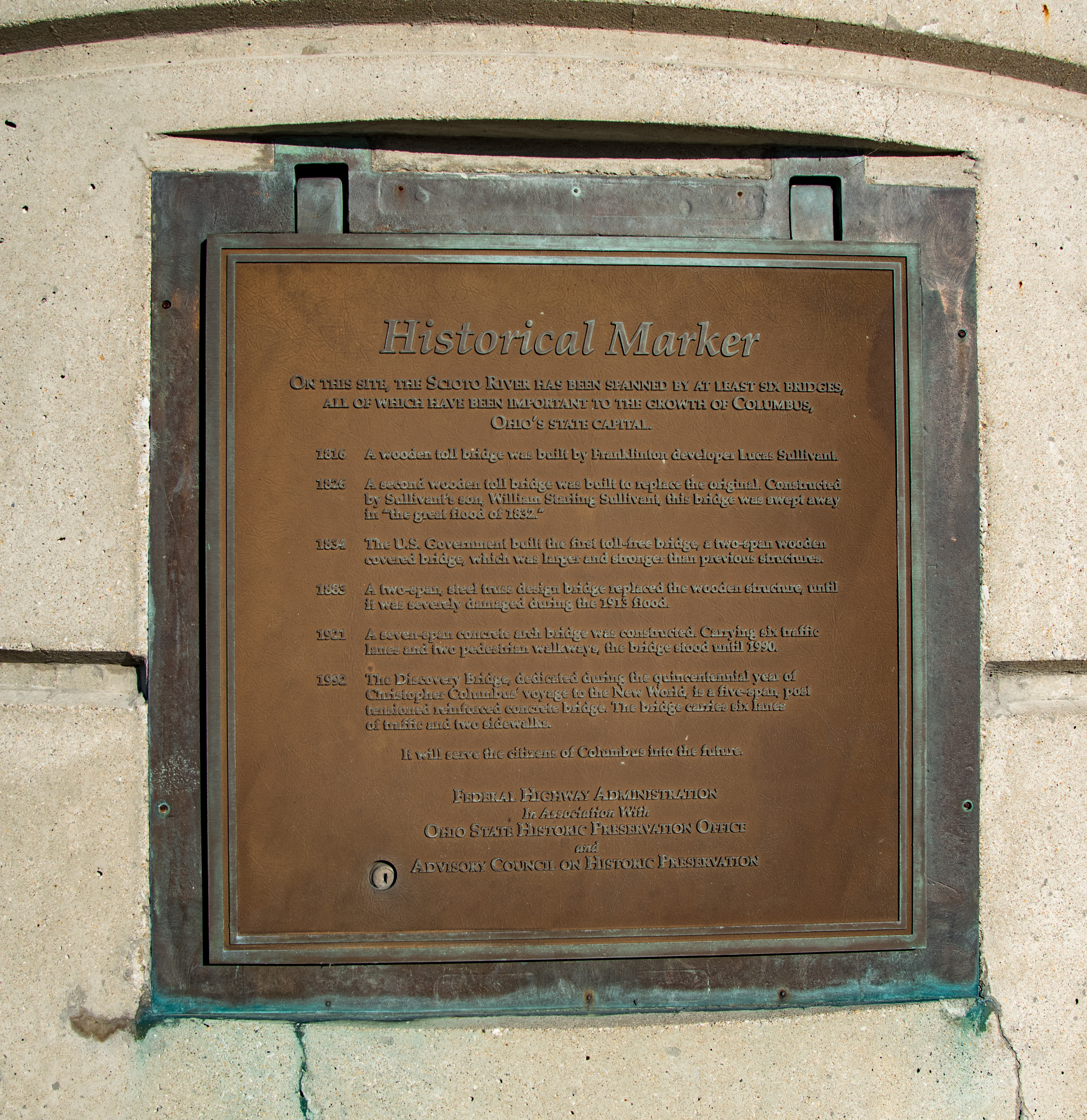
Historical marker denoting all prior bridges

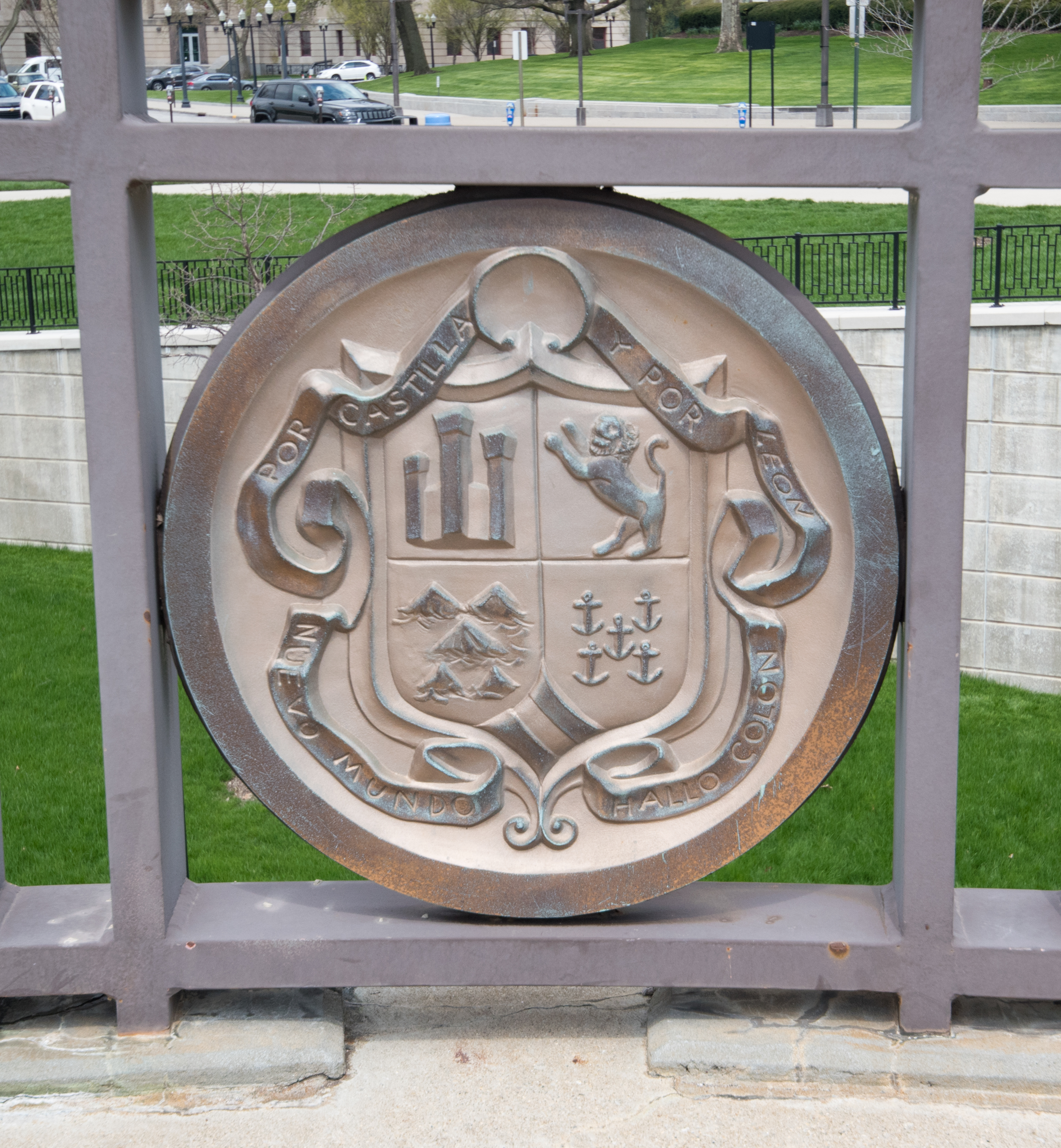
Christopher Columbus's House of Colon coat of arms

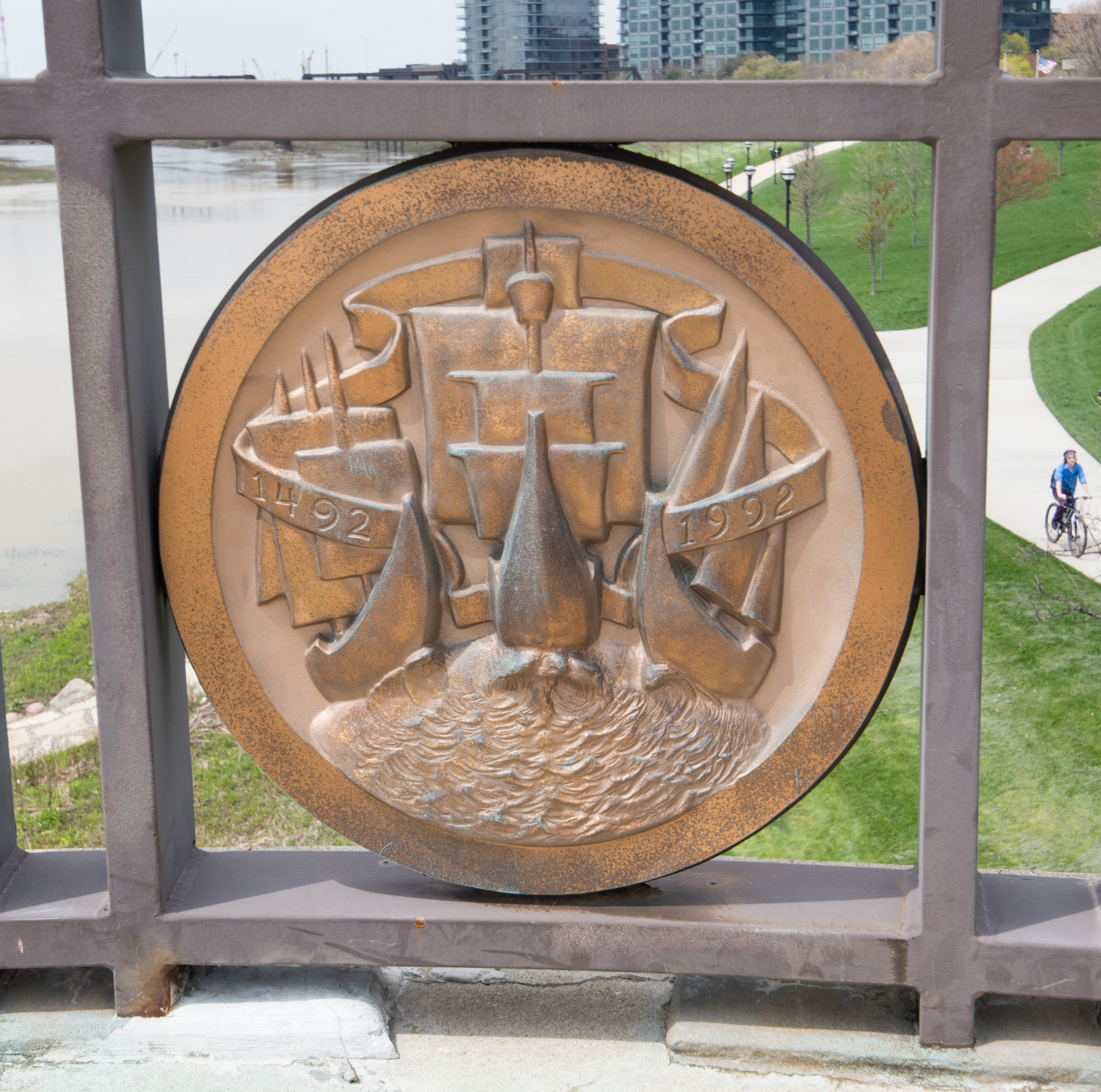
Depiction of Columbus's ships Niña, Pinta, and Santa María

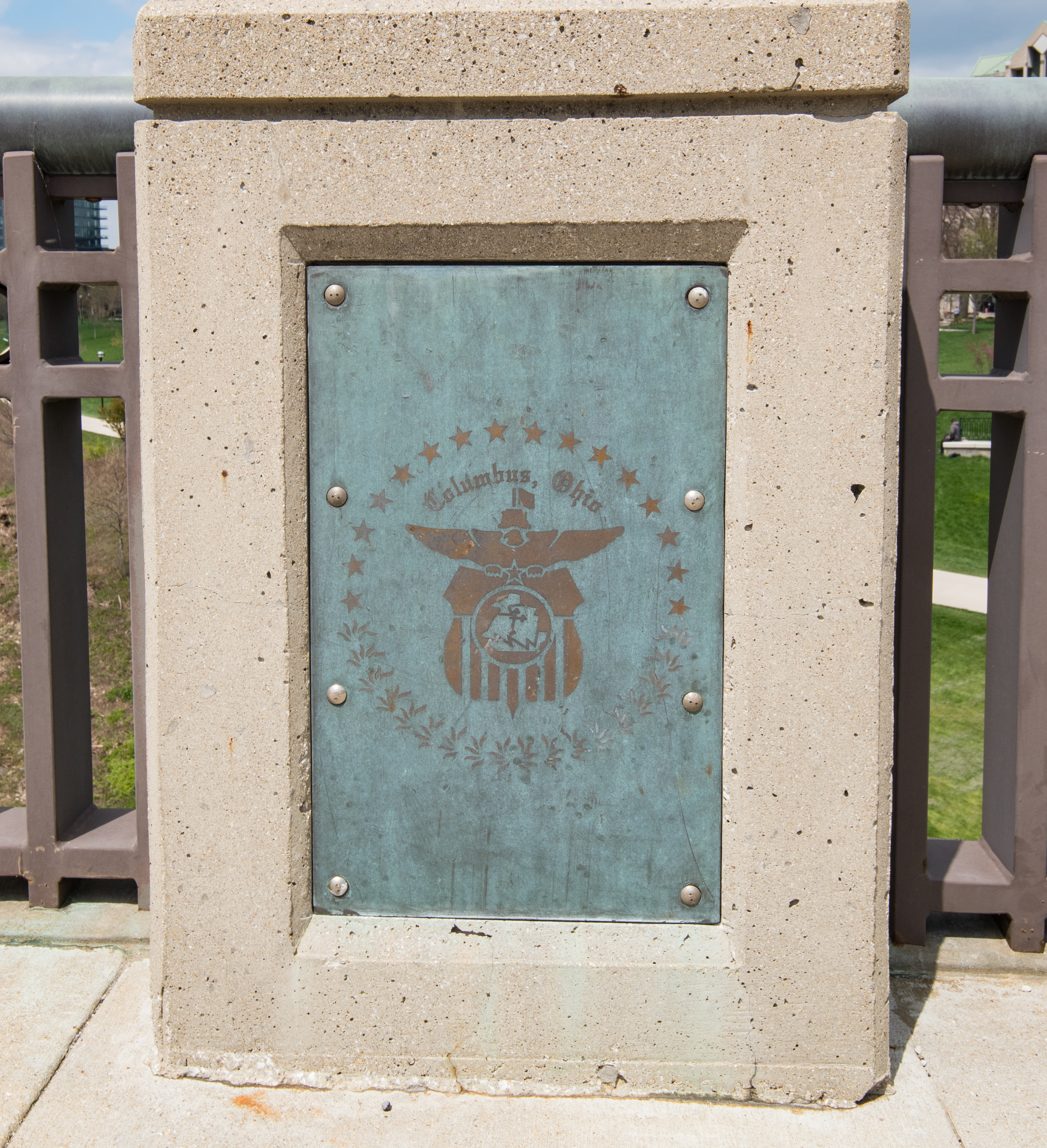
Columbus city seal

== See also ==
- List of bridges documented by the Historic American Engineering Record in Ohio
