= Marion Public Library =

Marion Public Library may refer to:

- Marion Public Library (Marion, Ohio), a Carnegie Library in Marion, Ohio
- Marion Public Library (Marion, Indiana), a Carnegie Library in Marion, Indiana
