= Trinity Baptist Church =

Trinity Baptist Church may refer to:

- Trinity Baptist Church (Concord, New Hampshire)
- Trinity Baptist Church in Marion, Ohio, located in the former Marion Public Library
- Trinity Baptist Ministries (Port Saint Lucie, Florida)

== See also ==
- Trinity Church (disambiguation)
