= Citizens Building =

Citizens Building may refer to:

- Citizens Building (Cleveland, Ohio)
- Citizens Building (Columbus, Ohio)
