= Anderson Museum of Art =

- Carnegie Public Library
- U.S. National Register of Historic Places
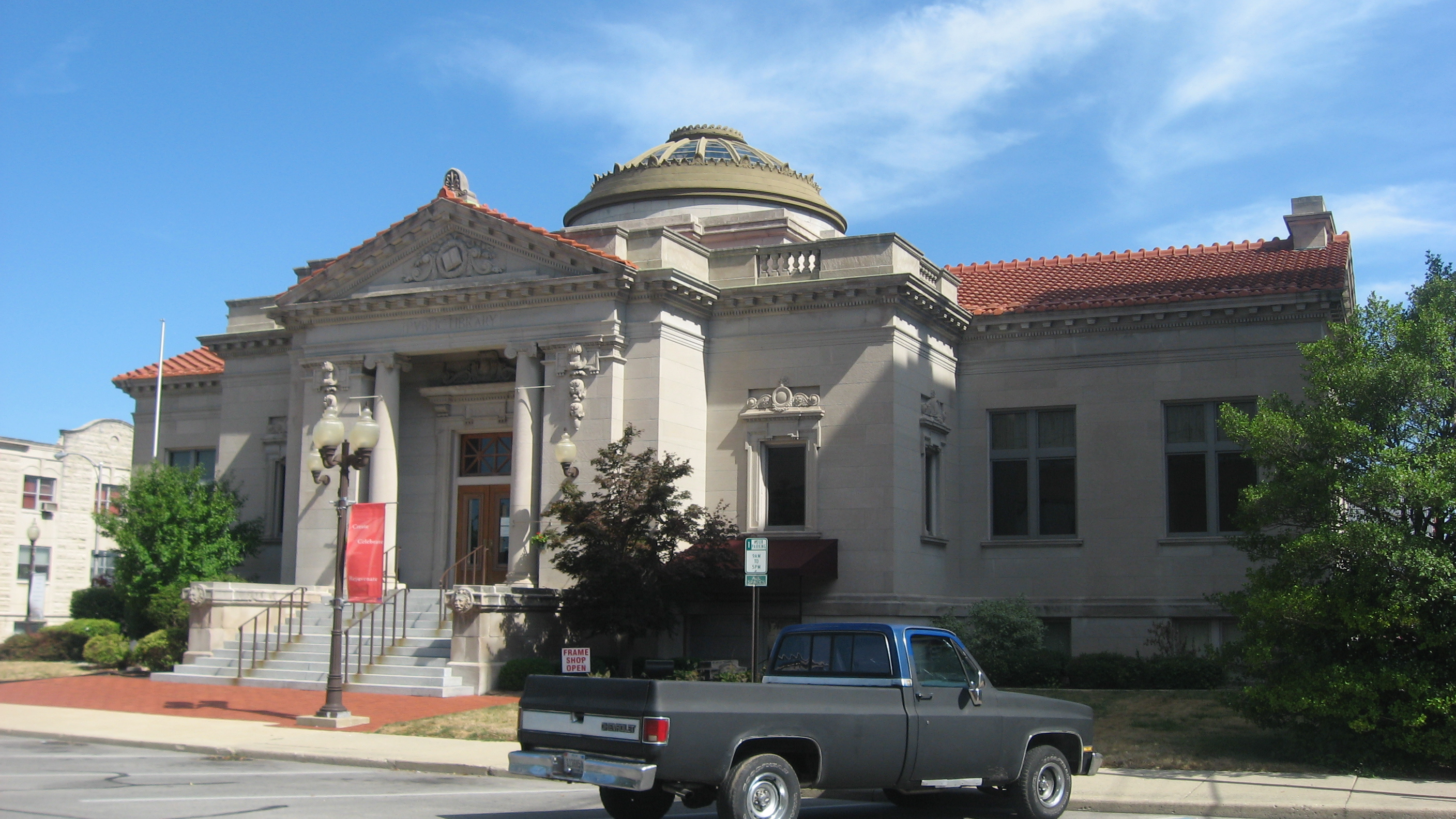
- Front of the building

- Location within Indiana Location within the United States
- Location: 32 W. 10th St., Anderson, Indiana
- Coordinates: 40°6′23″N 85°40′49″W
- Area: Less than 1 acre (0.40 ha)
- Built: 1905
- Architect: Thompson and Millspaugh; Richards, McCarty, and Bulford
- Architectural style: Beaux-Arts
- NRHP reference No.: 85000603
- Added to NRHP: March 21, 1985

The Anderson Museum of Art (previously known as the Anderson Center for the Arts) is located in downtown Anderson, Indiana at 32 West 10th Street in the former Carnegie Library building built partly in honor of educator and railroad executive John Byers Anderson. The building, as Carnegie Public Library, is listed in the National Register of Historic Places.

== History ==
The center is located in the Beaux-Arts-style former Carnegie library. Andrew Carnegie provided a $50,000 grant for the building's construction. The building features a 35-foot (11 m) high rotunda with a 40-foot (12 m) stained glass domed ceiling and marble floors. The library moved to a new facility in 1987.

The museum specializes in collecting Indiana and contemporary art.

== See also ==
- List of museums in Indiana
- National Register of Historic Places listings in Madison County, Indiana

== Cited works ==
- Anderson: A Pictorial History by Esther Dittlinger, copyright 1990, page 192. ISBN 978-0943963167
