= Lassen Hotel (Wichita, Kansas) =

- U.S. National Register of Historic Places
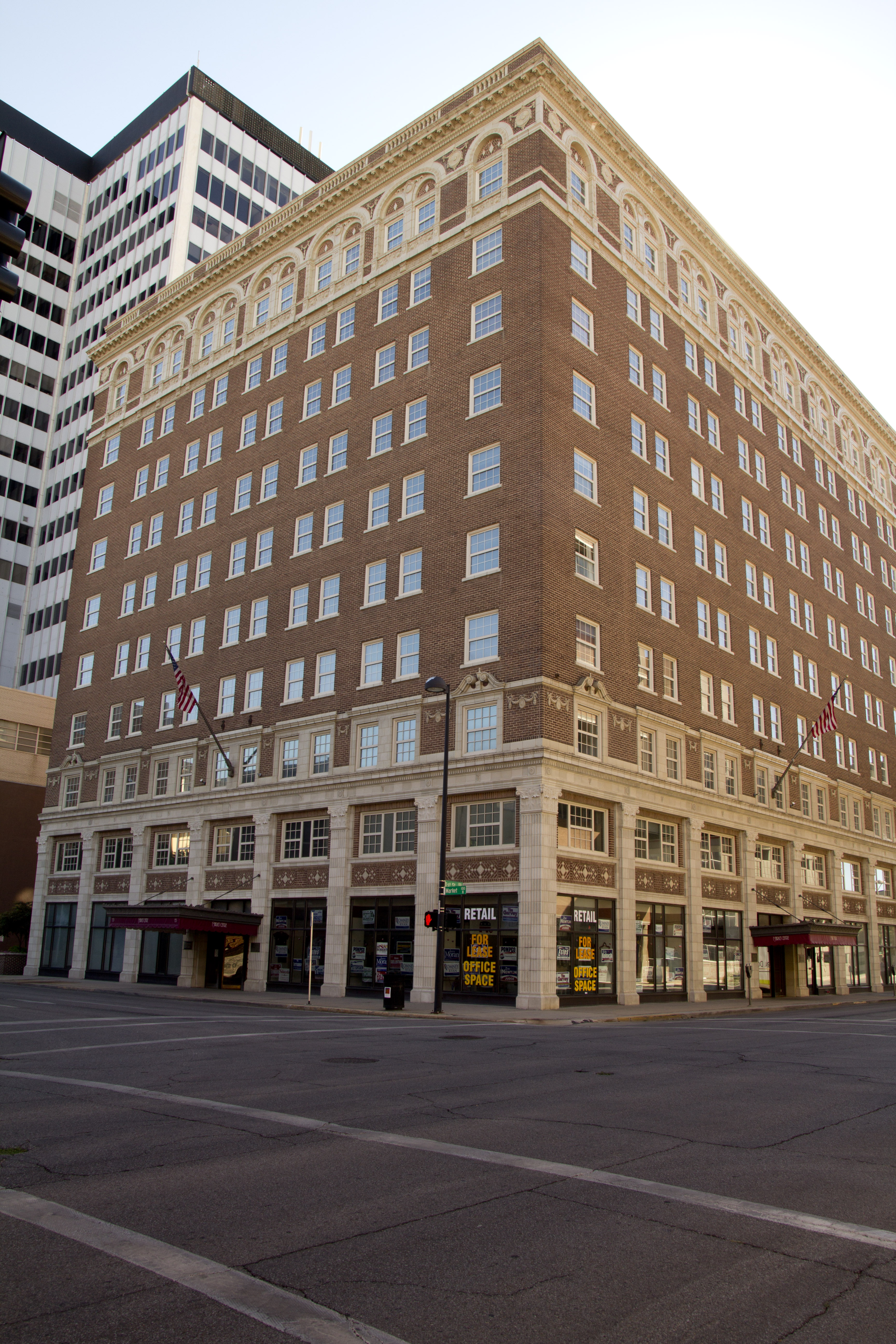

- Location within Kansas Location within the United States
- Location: 155 N. Market St. (at 1st St.), Wichita, Kansas
- Coordinates: 37°41′16″N 97°20′13″W
- Area: less than one acre
- Built: 1918
- Architect: Richards, McCarty & Bulford
- Architectural style: Chicago, Late 19th and 20th Century Revivals, Second Renaissance Revival
- NRHP reference No.: 84000108
- Added to NRHP: October 4, 1984

Market Centre in Wichita, Kansas was built in 1918 as the Lassen Hotel. It was designed by architects Richards, McCarty & Bulford. It was listed on the National Register of Historic Places in 1984.

The 11-story building originally had an L-shaped plan for floors 3 to 11. It was expanded in 1922 by adding a wing that gave the structure a U-shaped plan.

The hotel was acquired by the Schimmel Hotel group in 1942, which operated it until it was sold in 1969.

The building has a 2-story annex that is not included in the NRHP listing.

In 1954 a satellite studio of Hutchinson-based television station KTVH opened in the building. This was the first television station to open that covered Wichita, the state's largest city. KTVH's attempts to provide service to Wichita, in what would become a running theme in the first three decades of station history, rankled the stations licensed there. KAKE radio and television petitioned the FCC in November 1954 to order KTVH to stop identifying as a "Wichita station"; it declined to do so. In 1956, KTVH moved its Wichita facilities out of the Lassen and into quarters formerly used by the defunct KEDD.

The hotel operated as the Lassen Motor Hotel until July 1, 1969, when it was renamed the Radisson Wichita Hotel. In 1971, it was purchased by the Defenders of the Christian Faith and was operated as a retirement home with offices and retail space. It was the subject of the Kansas Supreme Court case, Defenders of the Christian Faith v. Board of County Commissioners, 219 Kan. 181, 547 P.2d 706 (1976). In 1983, work began to convert the structure to an office building. By 1986, it was functioning as offices, renamed Market Centre. In 2015, the offices were vacated in preparation for a conversion of the structure into 110 apartments. The work never began, and the structure has remained vacant for years. In October 2024, it was announced that it would be converted to the Market Centre Apartments, containing affordable housing.

== See also ==
- KFH (AM) - the hotel previously owned this radio station
