= Knights of Columbus Building (Columbus, Ohio) =

- U.S. National Register of Historic Places
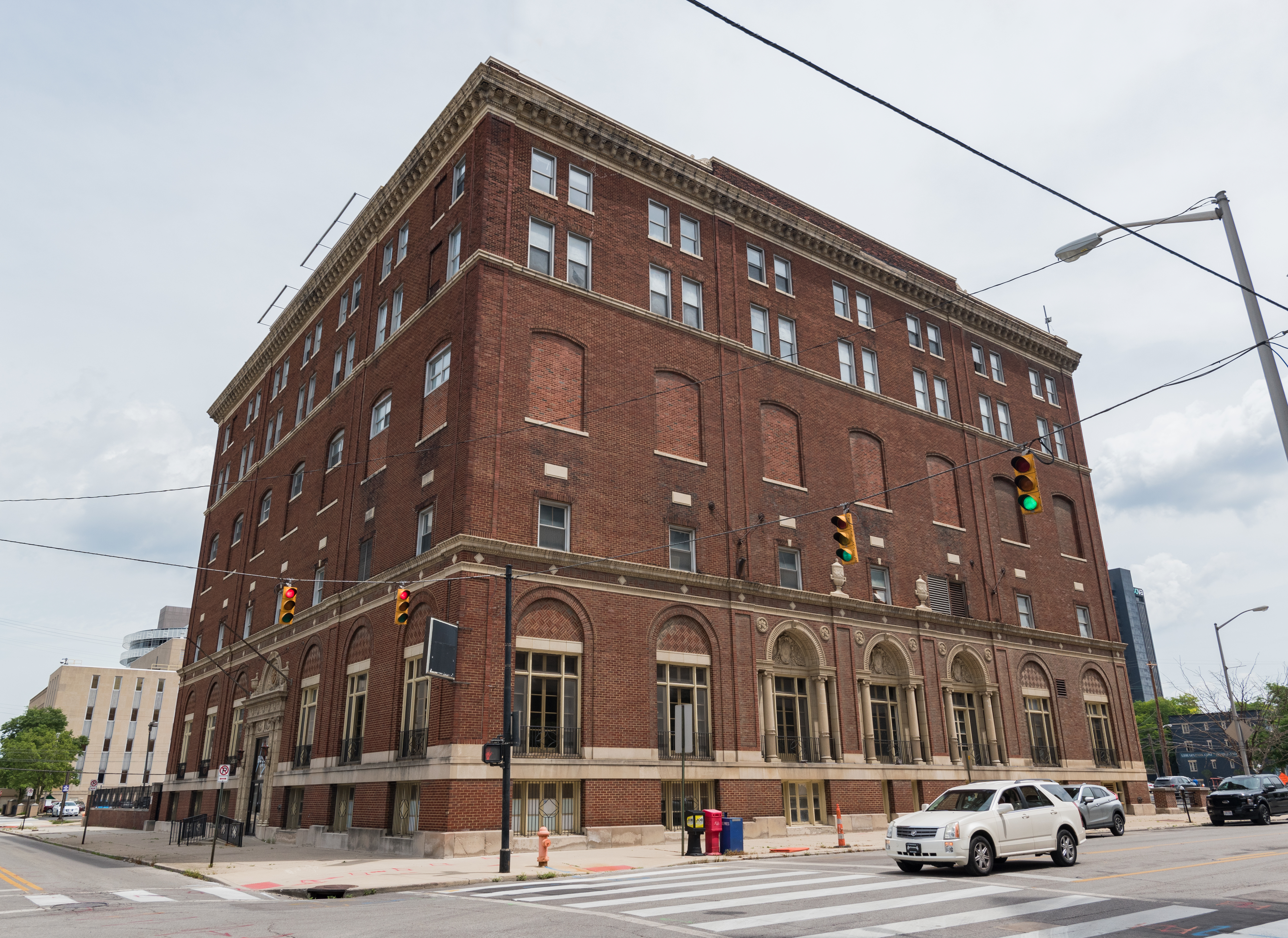
- Interactive map highlighting the building's location
- Location: 80 S. Sixth St., 306 E. State St., Columbus, Ohio
- Coordinates: 39.961371°N 82.992001°W
- Built: 1927
- Architect: Richards, McCarty and Bulford
- Architectural style: Beaux-Arts
- NRHP reference No.: 100005448
- Added to NRHP: August 24, 2020

The Knights of Columbus Building is a historic building in Downtown Columbus, Ohio. It was listed on the National Register of Historic Places in 2020.

The building was listed as one of the most endangered properties in Columbus in 2018, in a report by Columbus Landmarks. It was designed by Richards, McCarty and Bulford and was built in 1927. It served as the local headquarters for the Knights of Columbus. The Roman Catholic order the Salesian Society acquired the building in 1968, and it became known as the Salesian Boys and Girls Club. It later served as the Bosco Center, until May 2017.

The five-story building has numerous athletic facilities: a gymnasium, bowling alley, swimming pool, and basketball court, in addition to a grand ballroom.

== See also ==
- National Register of Historic Places listings in Columbus, Ohio
