= Richards, McCarty & Bulford =

American architectural firm (active 1898-1943)

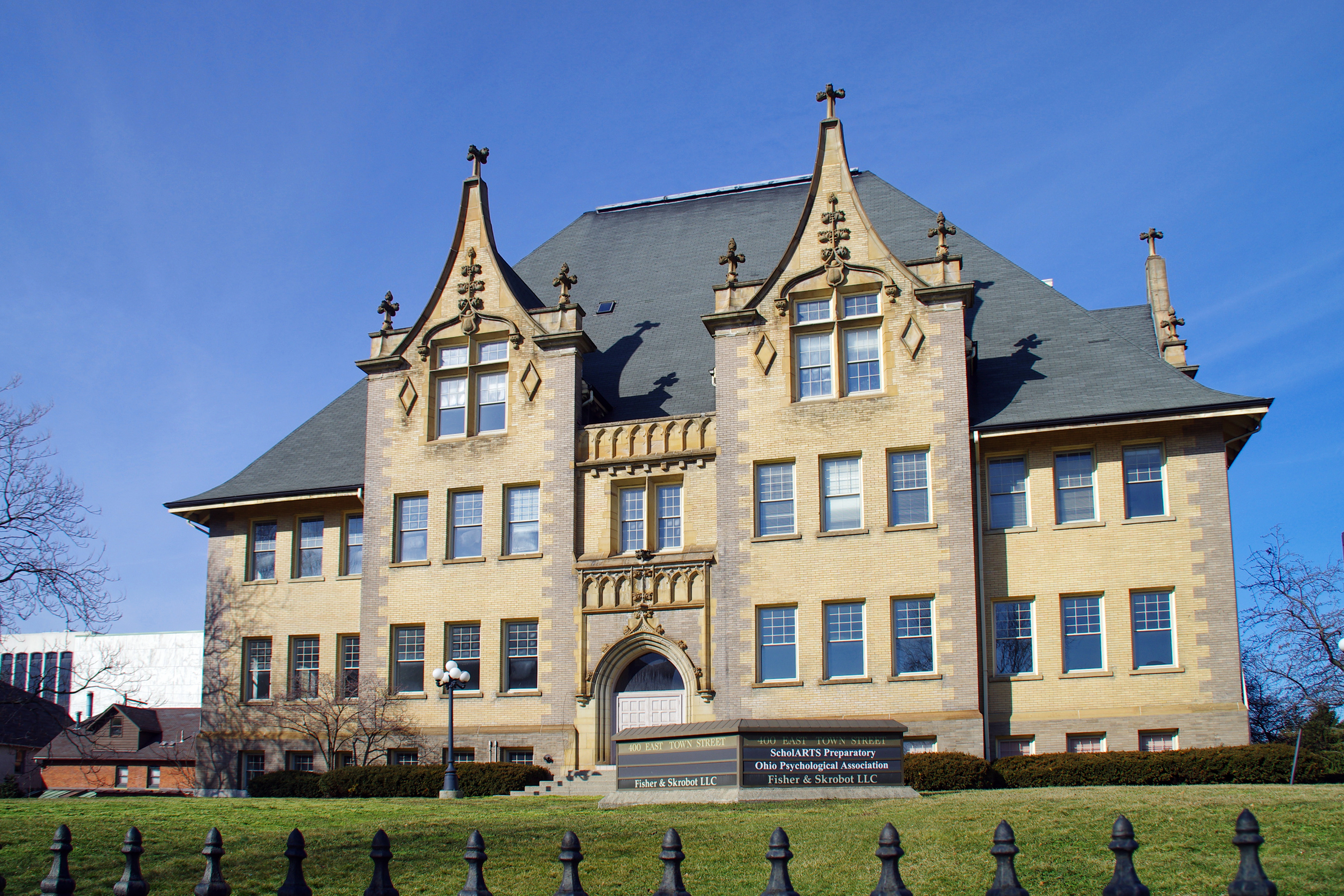
The School Building (1899) of the former Ohio Institution for the Deaf and Dumb in Columbus, designed in the Châteauesque style

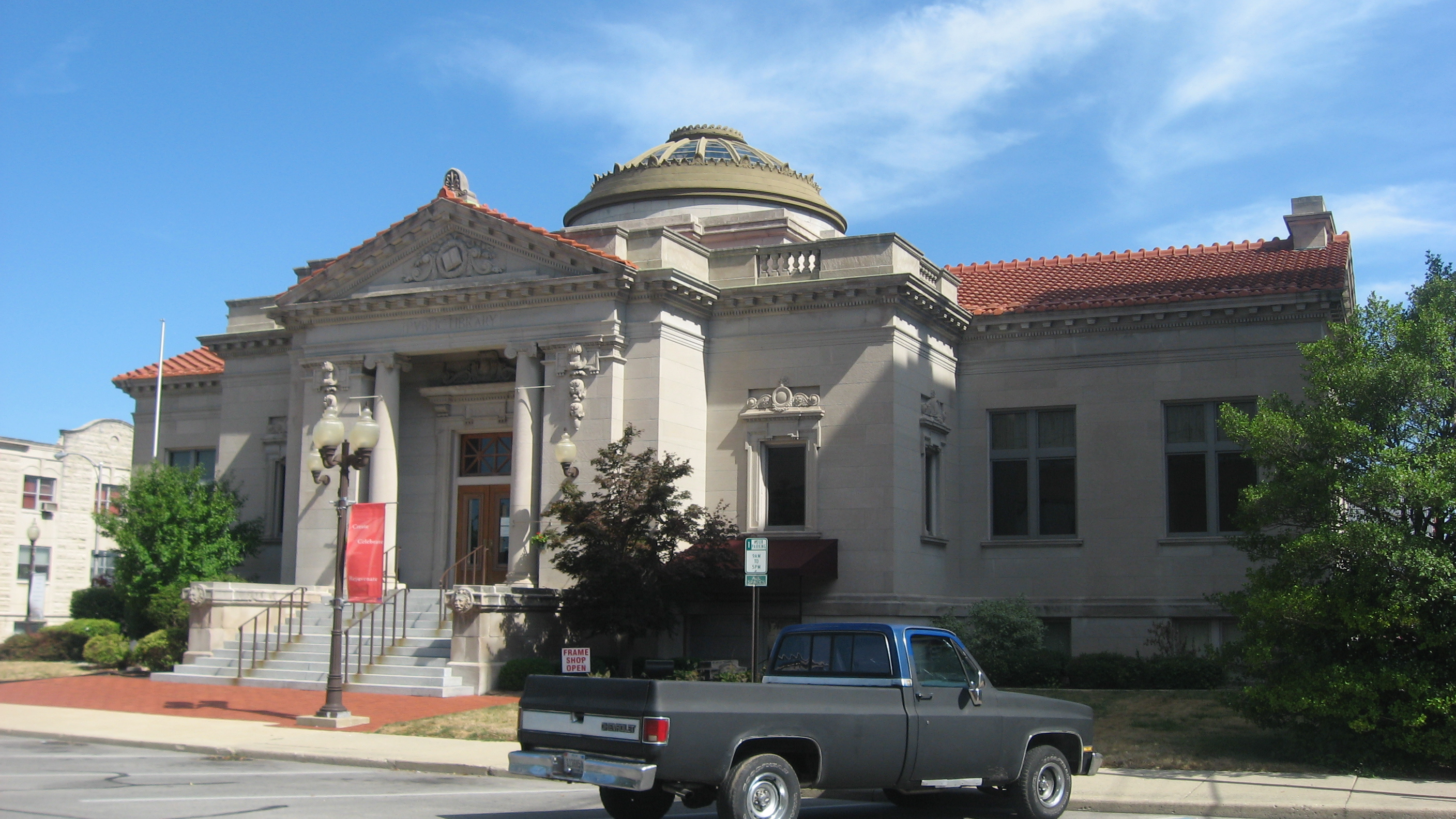
The former Carnegie Public Library (1905) in Anderson, Indiana, designed in the Neoclassical style

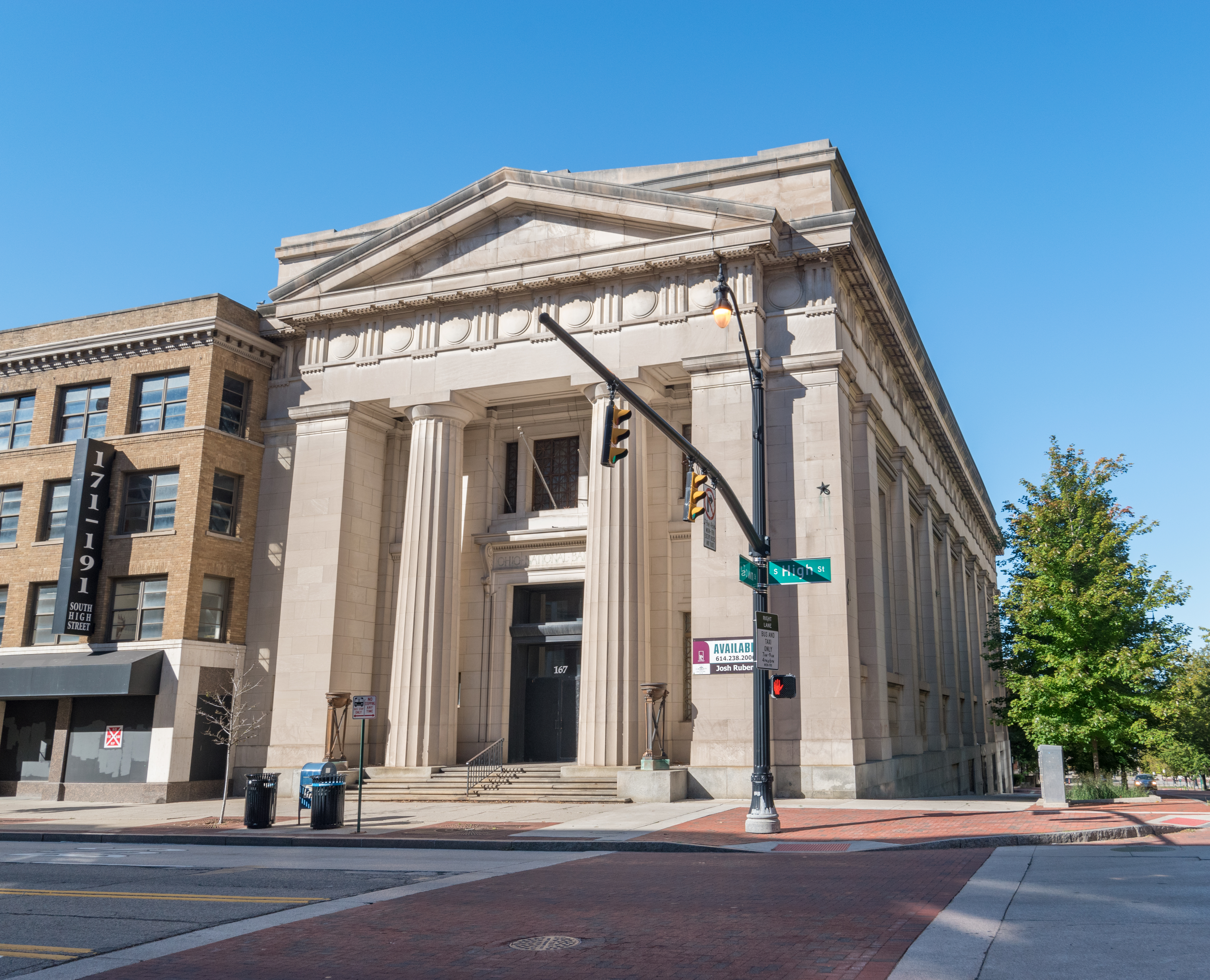
The Ohio National Bank Building (1911) in Columbus, designed in the Neoclassical style

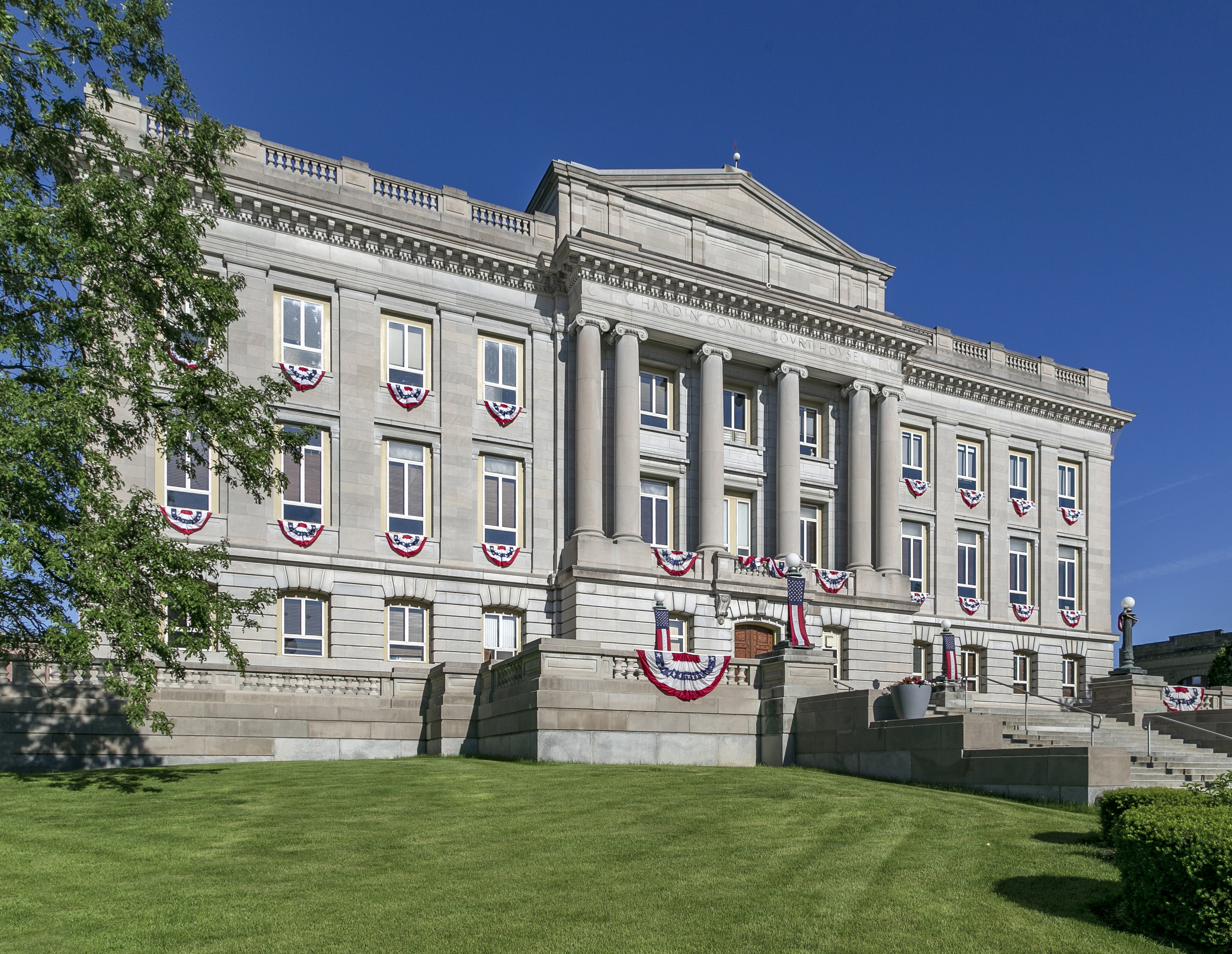
The Hardin County Courthouse (1915) in Kenton, designed in the Neoclassical style

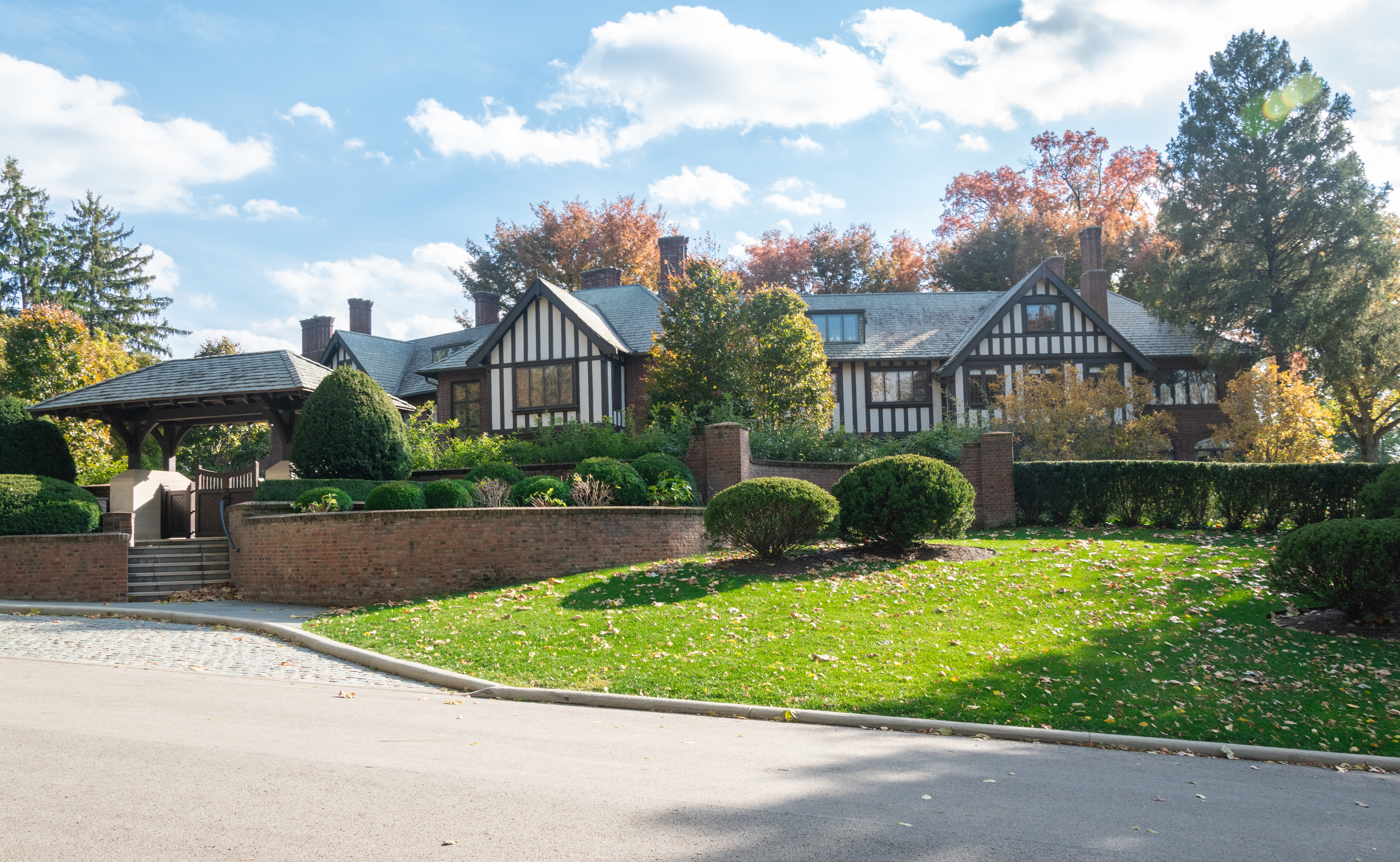
The Frederick A. Miller House (1915) in Columbus, designed in the Tudor Revival style

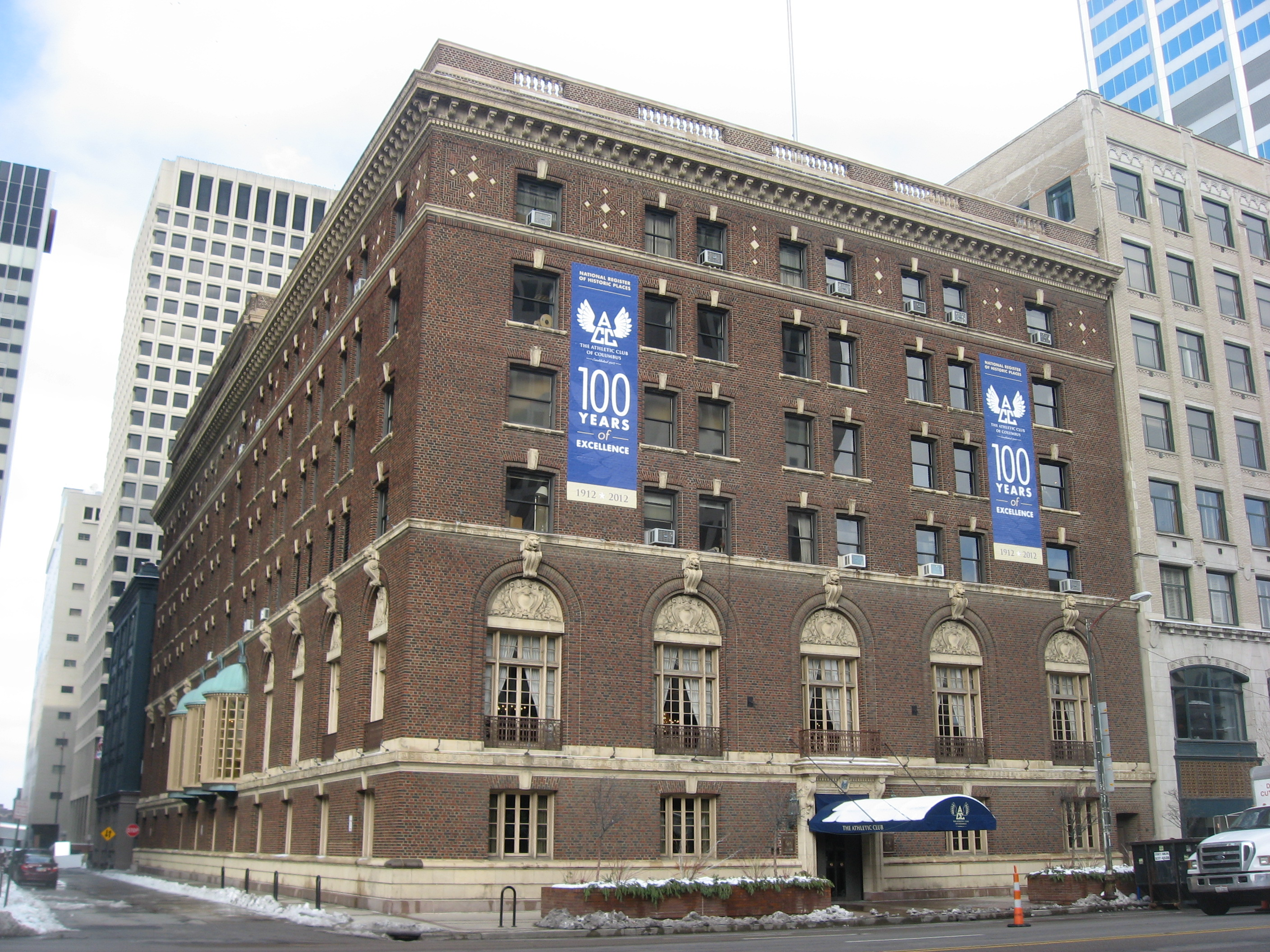
The Athletic Club of Columbus (1916), designed in the Colonial Revival style

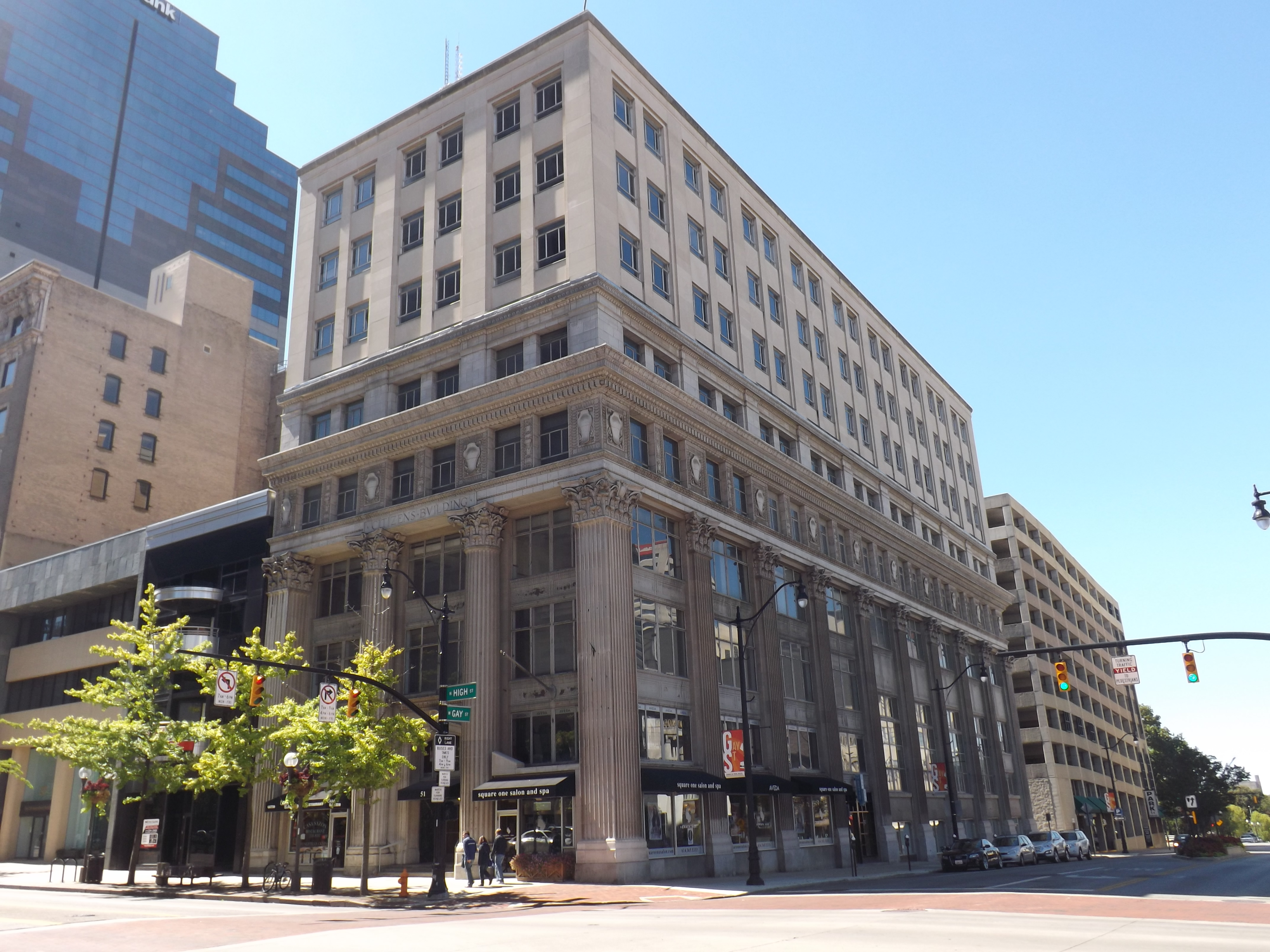
The Citizens Building (1917) in Columbus, designed in the Neoclassical style

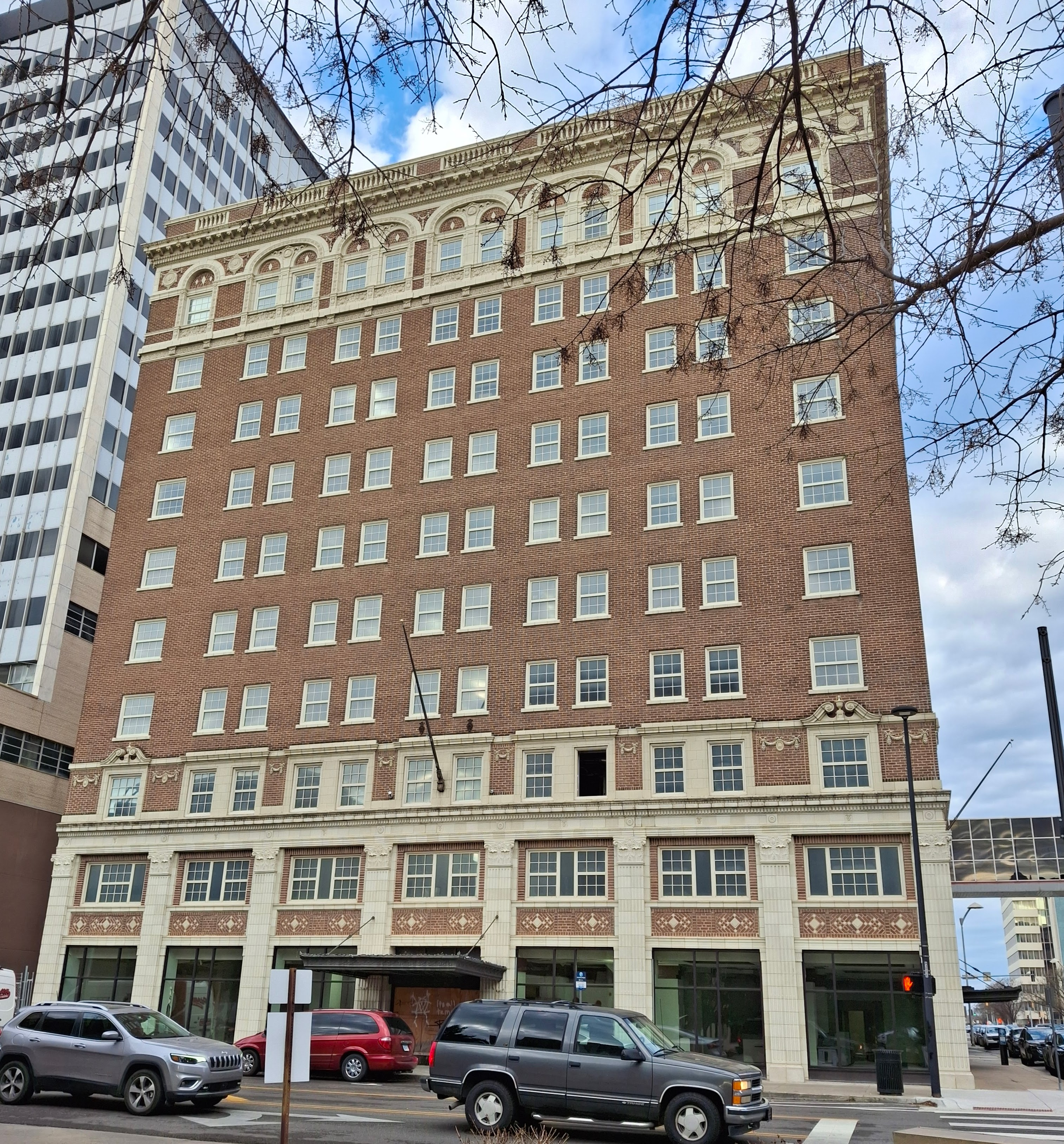
The Lassen Hotel (1918) in Wichita, Kansas, designed in the Colonial Revival style

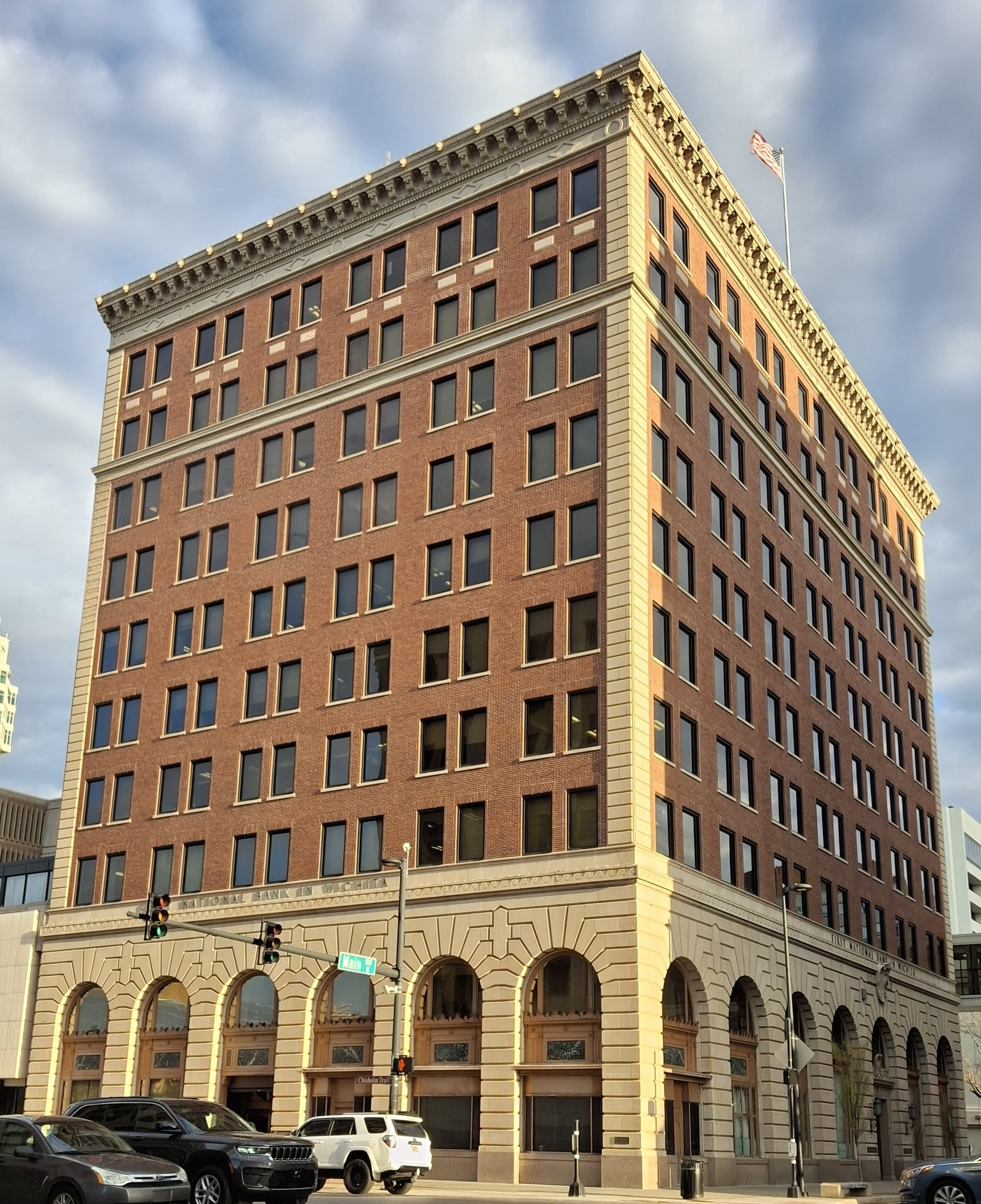
The First National, now INTRUST, Bank Building (1922), in Wichita, Kansas, designed in the Renaissance Revival style

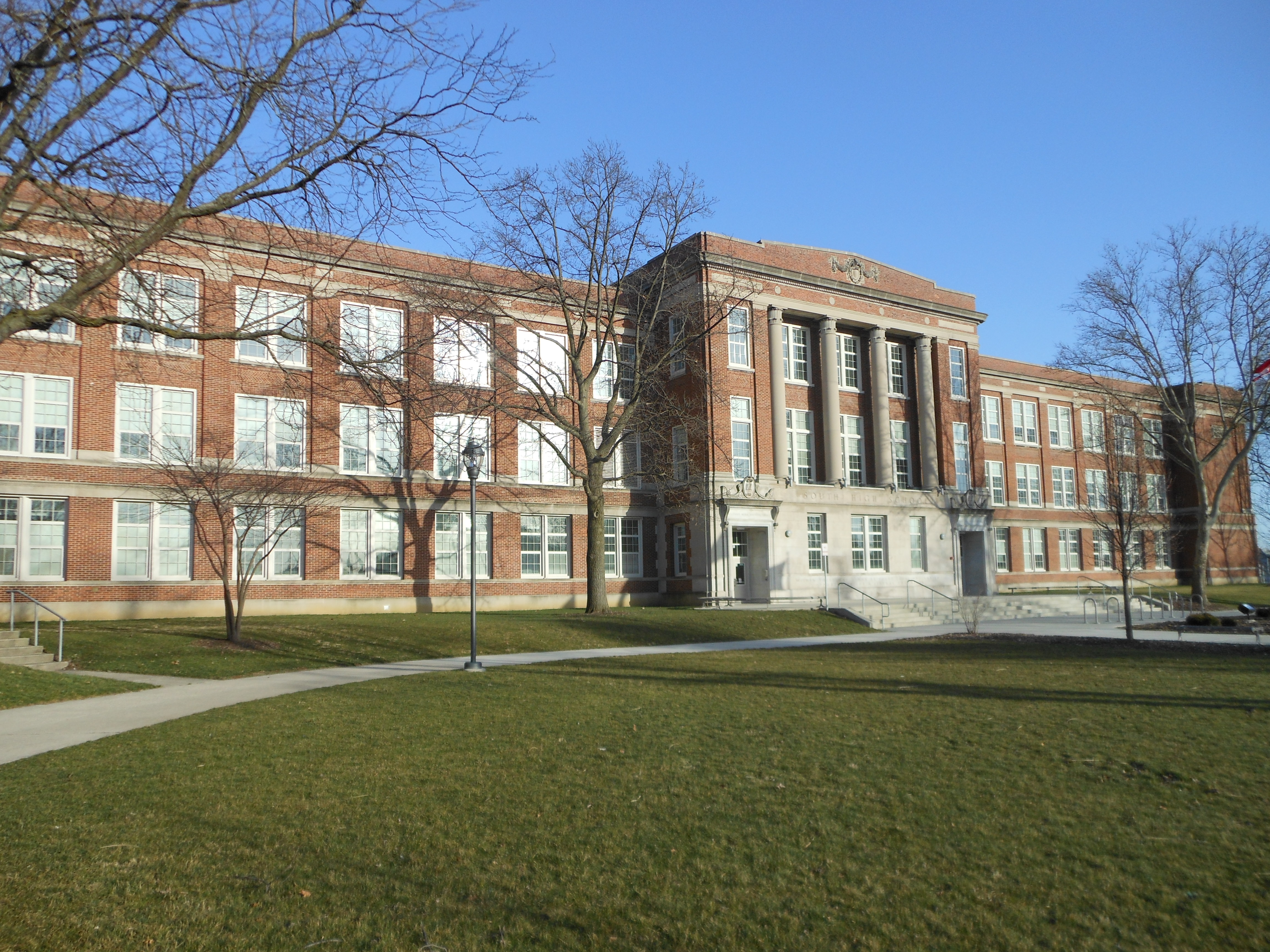
South High School (1924) in Columbus, designed in the Colonial Revival style

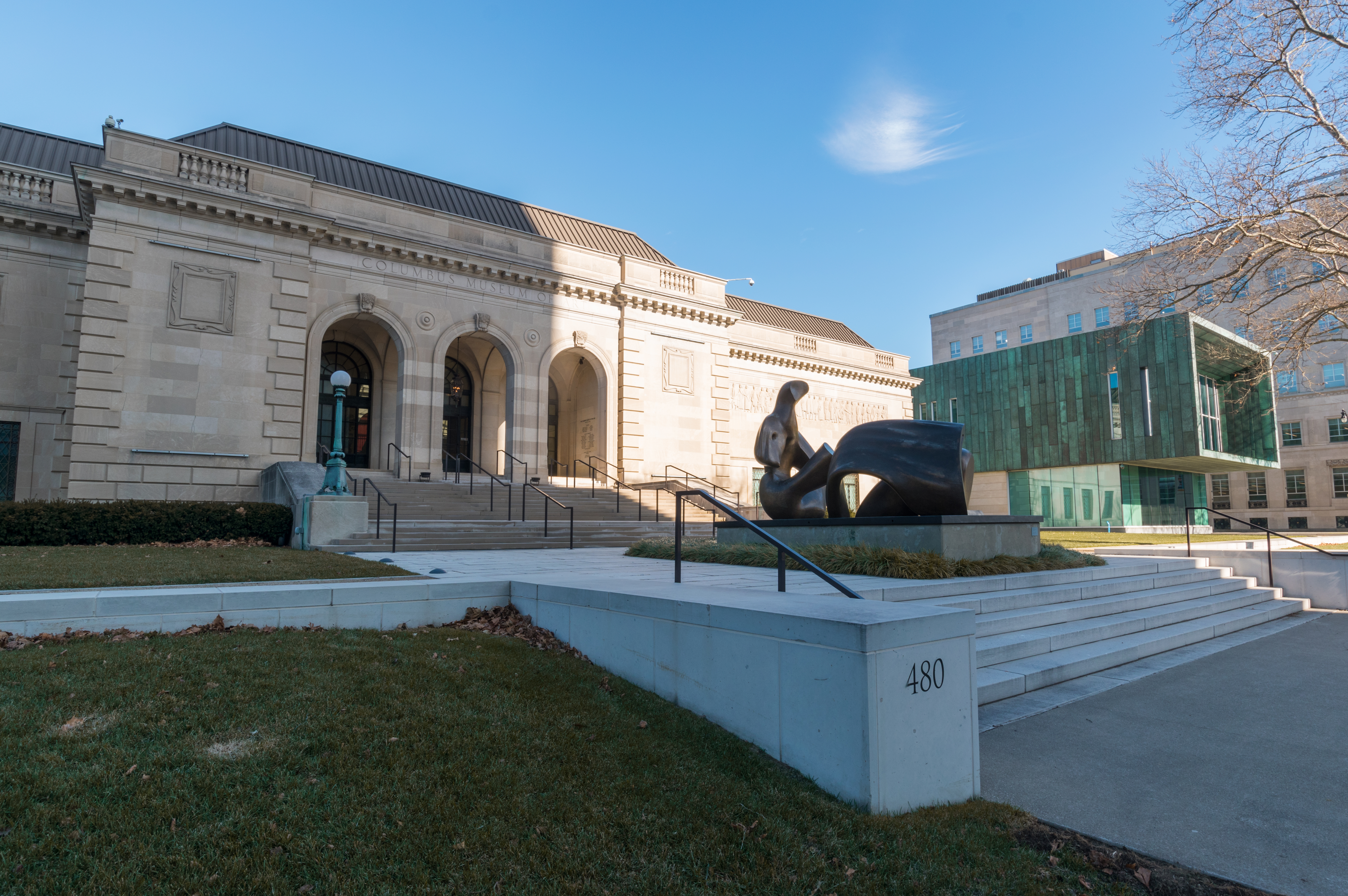
The Ross building of the Columbus Museum of Art (1931), designed in the Renaissance Revival style

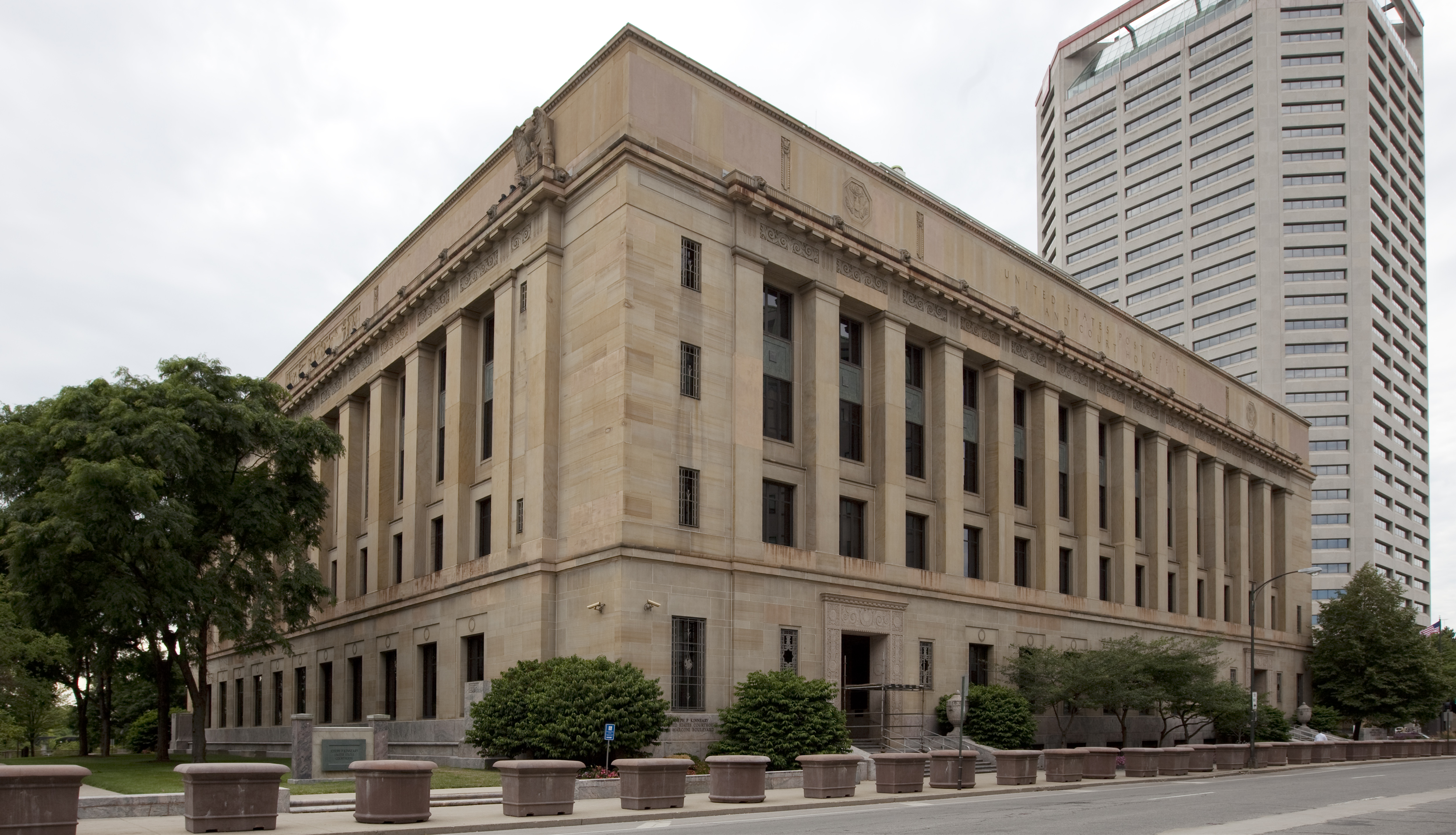
The Joseph P. Kinneary United States Courthouse (1934) in Columbus, designed in the Stripped Classical style

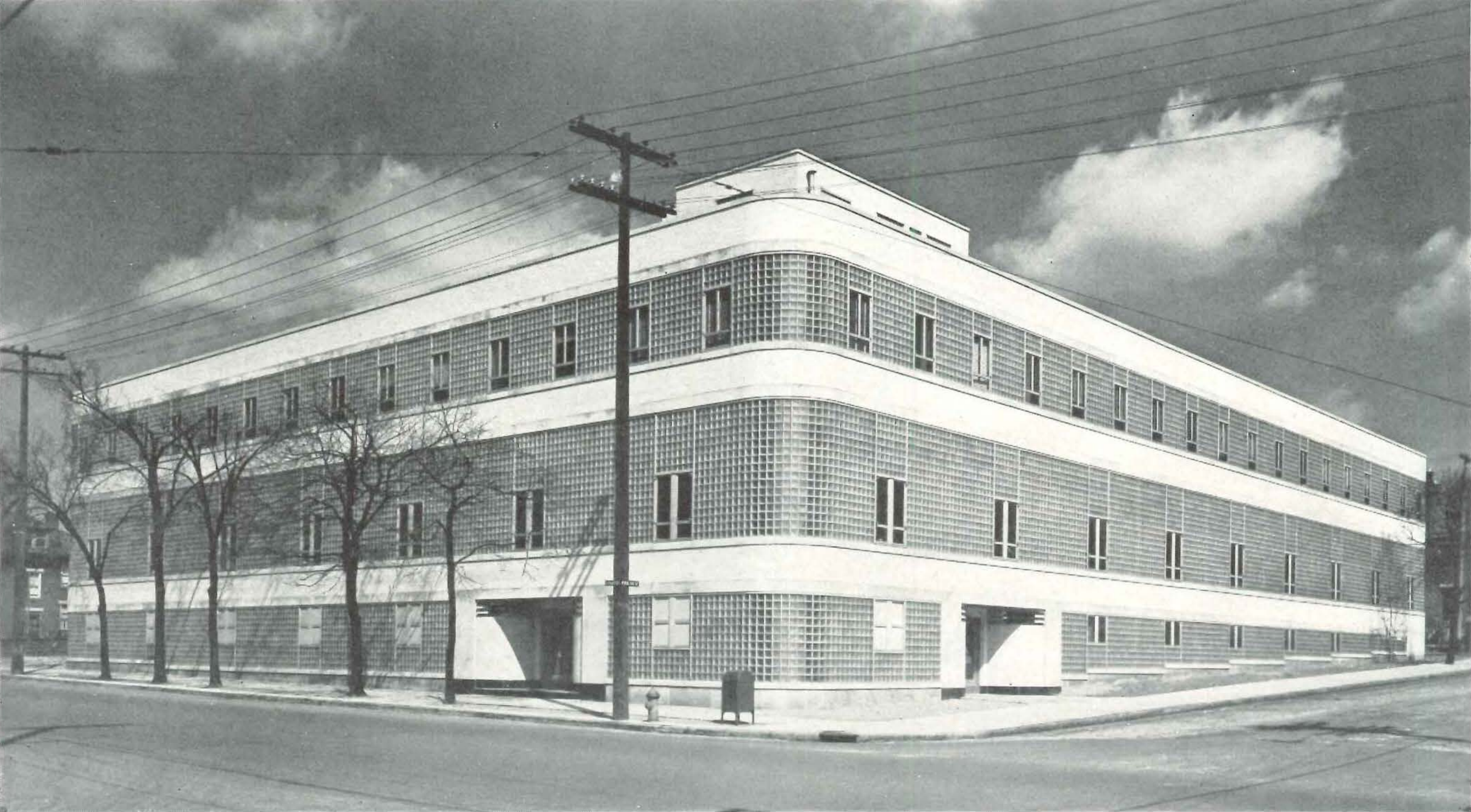
The American Education Press Building (1936, demolished) in Columbus, designed in the Art Moderne style

Richards, McCarty & Bulford was an American architectural firm. It was active in Columbus, Ohio, from 1898 until 1943 and was for much of that period the leading architectural firm in the city. They were responsible for a wide range of public and private buildings built in Ohio and elsewhere in the Southern and Midwestern United States.

== History ==
The firm was established in 1898 under the name Richards & McCarty by Clarence Earl Richards (February 22, 1865 – February 21, 1921) and Joel Edward McCarty (December 9, 1856 – July 22, 1952), employees of the leading local architectural firm, Yost & Packard. McCarty, the elder of the partners, was born in Macomb, Illinois. He was raised in Iowa and attended public schools before entering the Iowa State Normal School; after graduating in 1880 he taught for two years. In 1883 he moved to Columbus and joined the office of architect Joseph W. Yost, his mother's brother. Richards was born in Jackson, Michigan. In 1871 Richards's father moved the family to a homestead in Butler County, Kansas; after ten years they moved into the county seat of El Dorado, where Richards completed his public school education. He then went on to the Kansas State Normal School to train as a teacher, which profession he followed until 1886. Richards had always wanted to be an architect or engineer and to that end he obtained a position as an assistant engineer with the Missouri Pacific Railroad. In that role he worked as a superintendent of buildings and bridges for the railroad's southwestern division. In 1889 he moved to Cincinnati, where he joined the office of established architect Edwin Anderson. After two years with Anderson he moved to Newark, Ohio, where he formed a partnership with his brother, an engineer, under the name Richards Brothers. In 1893 this was dissolved and Richards moved to Columbus, where he joined McCarty in the recently-reorganized firm of Yost & Packard.

In 1899 they were joined by George Henry Bulford (January 19, 1870 – April 23, 1942) and the firm was reorganized under its familiar name. Bulford was born in Worcester, England, and came to Columbus in 1886 with his widowed mother and siblings. There, he joined McCarty in Yost's office and stayed until joining his former colleagues in partnership. By 1920 the firm had emerged as the leading architects in Columbus and its partnership was recognized as being the longest-lasting in the profession in Ohio. By this time they had also completed notable works in Indiana, Kansas, Kentucky, Missouri, Tennessee and Texas. In 1921 Richards died, though his partners continued under the same name.

Bulford became active in the Columbus Chamber of Commerce during the presidency of his former employer, Frank L. Packard, in 1919–20. Packard appointed Bulford chair of the chamber's Civic Center committee, which was responsible for developing proposals for what became the Columbus Civic Center. After Bulford's committee made its report the influential Packard took over leadership of the project. Major planning did not begin until after Packard's death; to execute the project local architects, including McCarty and Bulford, formed the Allied Architects Association of Columbus in 1924. Bulford was president of the association for its entire existence and his firm was responsible for the last of the civic center buildings to be built, the Joseph P. Kinneary United States Courthouse (1934, NRHP-listed). The association was voluntarily dissolved in 1936.

In December 1940 McCarty, aged 84, and Bulford, aged 70, were noted as two of Ohio's oldest and most respected architects. Bulford died in the spring of 1942, shortly after the United States entered World War II. After Bulford's death McCarty apparently ceded control to two employees of the firm, Wilfred A. Paine and George D. Crumley, who formed a successor partnership under the name Paine & Crumley. With Crumley away on defense work during World War II, Paine's sudden death in October 1943 concluded the firm's 45 years of continuous operation.

== Legacy ==
In 1945, shortly before the end of the war, the firm resumed as Tibbals, Crumley & Musson under the leadership of Todd Tibbals, Crumley and Noverre Musson. In 1975 the firm, now led by Musson, merged with the practice of Wolfgang Doerschlag to form Doerschlag/Musson. Doerschlag withdrew only a year later and Musson continued the firm as Noverre Musson Associates until his retirement in 1987. Musson donated his records to the Ohio Historical Society in 1986.

Richards, McCarty & Bulford has been described by historians at the General Services Administration as the "preeminent" architectural firm in Columbus. The firm's partners were local leaders in the architectural profession. In 1913 McCarty and Bulford were among the charter members of AIA Columbus, the local chapter of the American Institute of Architects (AIA), with Bulford serving as inaugural chapter president. McCarty served as chapter president in 1914, Richards in 1916 and Bulford served for a second term in 1921.

A number of the firm's works, listed below, are listed on the United States National Register of Historic Places (NRHP).

== Architectural works ==
=== Indiana ===
- 1902: Marion Public Library (former), Marion, Indiana
  - A Carnegie library; as of 2026, the History Center
- 1904: First Presbyterian Church (former), Marion, Indiana
- 1904: Grant County Jail and Sheriff's Residence, Marion, Indiana
  - NRHP-listed
- 1905: Carnegie Public Library (former), Anderson, Indiana
  - As of 2026, the Anderson Museum of Art; NRHP-listed

=== Kansas ===
- 1910: Beacon Building, Wichita, Kansas
  - Demolished
- 1911: The Forum, Wichita, Kansas
  - Demolished and replaced by Century II Performing Arts & Convention Center
- 1911: One Main Place, Wichita, Kansas
  - Originally known as the Schweiter Building
- 1913: Wiley Building, Hutchinson, Kansas
  - Originally known as the Rorabaugh Building
- 1918: Lassen Hotel, Wichita, Kansas
  - NRHP-listed
- 1920: Wesley Medical Center, Wichita, Kansas
- 1921: Wheeler-Kelly-Hagny Building, Wichita, Kansas
  - NRHP-listed
- 1922: INTRUST Bank Building, Wichita, Kansas
  - Built for INTRUST's predecessor, the First National Bank of Wichita
- 1924: Citizens National Bank Building, Emporia, Kansas
  - Designed by Richards, McCarty & Bulford, architects, with Ben H. Byrnes of Salina, associate architect

=== Kentucky ===
- 1904: Security Trust Building, Lexington, Kentucky
- 1904: YMCA (former), Lexington, Kentucky
  - As of 2026, occupied by LexArts as ArtsPlace
- 1905: Lexington City National Bank Building, Lexington, Kentucky
  - As of 2026 known as the Court Square Building; NRHP-listed
- 1907: Lexington Union Station, Lexington, Kentucky
  - Demolished in 1960
- 1909: First United Methodist Church, Lexington, Kentucky
- 1911: Phoenix Hotel, Lexington, Kentucky
  - Demolished in 1987
- 1919: Broadway Christian Church, Lexington, Kentucky
- 1922: Eleventh District School, Covington, Kentucky
  - NRHP-listed

=== Missouri ===
- 1915: United States Post Office (former), Boonville, Missouri
  - As of 2026, the Boonville City Hall

=== Ohio ===
==== Columbus ====
- 1899: School Building, Ohio Institution for the Deaf and Dumb (former), Columbus, Ohio
  - Now the Cristo Rey Columbus High School; NRHP-listed
- 1906: Johnson-Campbell House, Columbus, Ohio
  - NRHP-listed
- 1909: Lazarus Building, Columbus, Ohio
- 1911: Hartman Building and Theater, Columbus, Ohio
  - Demolished
- 1911: Ohio National Bank, Columbus, Ohio
  - NRHP-listed
- 1913: White–Haines Building, Columbus, Ohio
  - NRHP-listed
- 1914: St. Joseph Cathedral alterations, Columbus, Ohio
  - NRHP-listed
- 1915: Frederick A. Miller House, Columbus, Ohio
  - NRHP-listed
- 1916: Athletic Club of Columbus, Columbus, Ohio
  - Designed by Richards, McCarty & Bulford, architects, with Frank L. Packard, consulting architect; NRHP-listed
- 1917: Citizens Building, Columbus, Ohio
- 1924: South High School, Columbus, Ohio
- 1927: Congregation Tifereth Israel, Columbus, Ohio
- 1927: Knights of Columbus Building, Columbus, Ohio
  - NRHP-listed
- 1931: Columbus Museum of Art, Columbus, Ohio
- 1934: Joseph P. Kinneary United States Courthouse, Columbus, Ohio
  - NRHP-listed
- 1936: American Education Press Building, Columbus, Ohio
  - A unique local example of Streamline Moderne architecture; demolished
- 1940: Poindexter Village, Columbus, Ohio

==== Elsewhere ====
- 1903: Huber Building, Lancaster, Ohio
- 1904: Cleveland Hall (former), Denison University, Granville, Ohio
  - Since 2009, used as the Bryant Arts Center
- 1905: Eldridge-Higgins Building, Coshocton, Ohio
  - NRHP-listed
- 1905: Kenton Public Library (former), Kenton, Ohio
  - A Carnegie library; NRHP-listed
- 1906: Portsmouth Public Library, Portsmouth, Ohio
  - A Carnegie library
- 1907: First United Methodist Church, Lancaster, Ohio
- 1907: Lawrence County Courthouse, Ironton, Ohio
- 1908: Frank Huber Residence, Marion, Ohio
- 1908: Marion Public Library (former), Marion, Ohio
  - A Carnegie library
- 1915: Hardin County Courthouse, Kenton, Ohio
- 1917: Marting Hotel, Ironton, Ohio
  - NRHP-listed
- 1918: Preble County Courthouse, Eaton, Ohio
  - Designed by H. H. Hiestand and Richards, McCarty & Bulford, associated architects
- 1924: London Correctional Institution, London, Ohio
  - This institution was originally planned as a replacement for the Ohio Penitentiary; only the north-facing administration building was substantially completed before plans were revised
- 1929: Bexley United Methodist Church, Bexley, Ohio
- 1929: Canal Winchester High School (former), Canal Winchester, Ohio
- 1931: Marysville High School (former), Marysville, Ohio
- 1940: Hotel Lancaster (former), Lancaster, Ohio

=== Tennessee ===
- 1908: The Burwell, Knoxville, Tennessee
  - NRHP-listed

=== Texas ===
- 1920: Kemp Hotel, Wichita Falls, Texas
  - Demolished in 1964

== See also ==
- Architecture of Columbus, Ohio
