= Frederick A. Miller House =

Historic house in Ohio, United States

- Frederick A. Miller House-Broad Gables
- U.S. National Register of Historic Places
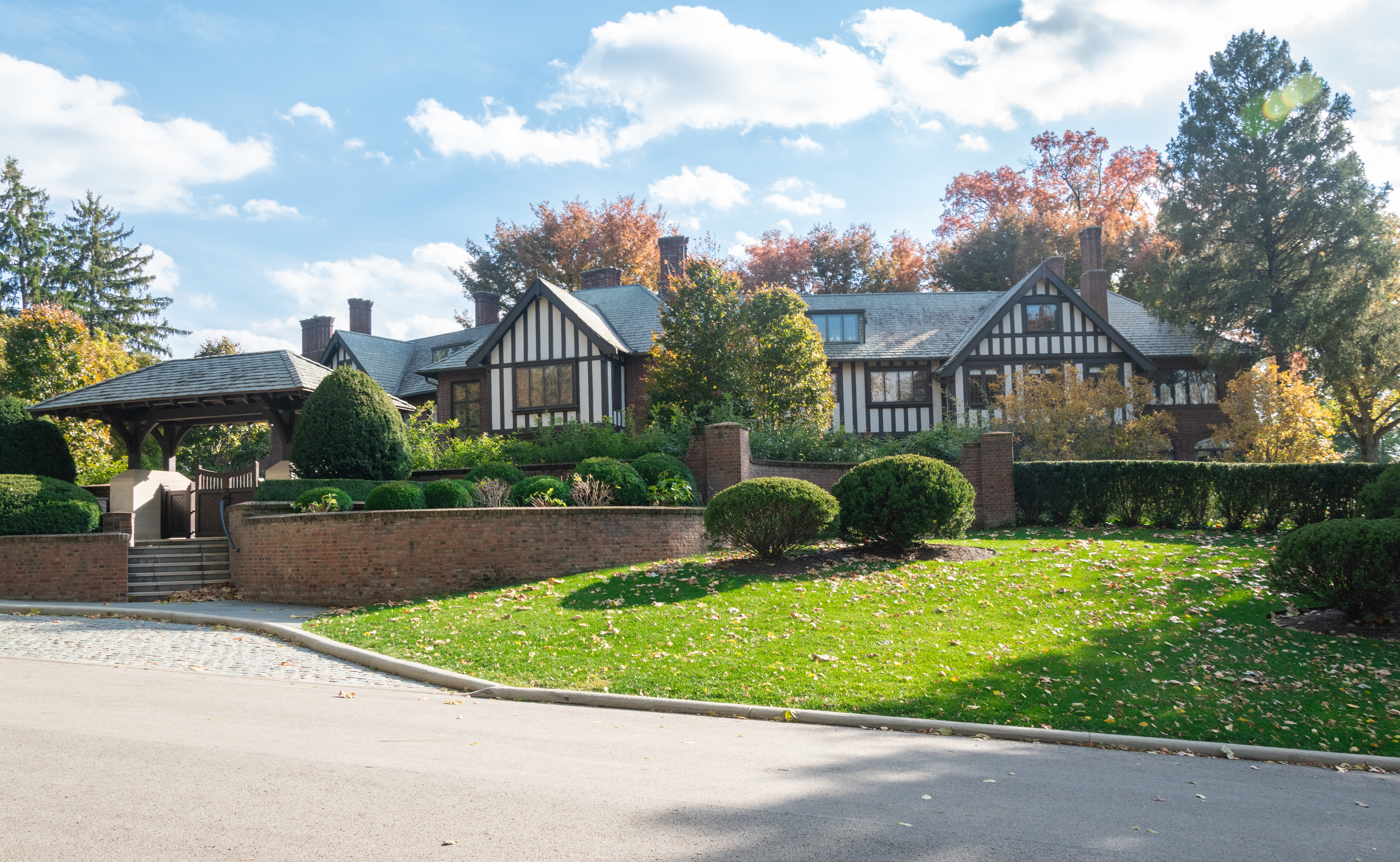
- Interactive map of Frederick A. Miller House-Broad Gables
- Location: 2065 Barton Pl. and 140 Park Dr., Columbus, Ohio
- Coordinates: 39.96510°N 82.94512°W
- Built: 1915
- Architect: Richards, McCarty & Bulford
- Architectural style: Tudor Revival
- NRHP reference No.: 85001689
- Added to NRHP: August 8, 1985

The Frederick A. Miller House, or Broad Gables, formerly the Monastery of the Immaculate Heart of Mary and the Carmelite Community is a historic house in the Wolfe Park neighborhood of Columbus, Ohio, United States. The house was listed on the National Register of Historic Places in 1985 and has been described as one of Columbus' grandest homes. It is a well-preserved example of early 20th century Tudor Revival houses. It was built in 1915 and designed by Columbus firm Richards, McCarty & Bulford in the Tudor Revival style.

== Miller family residence ==
The house was built for Frederick A. Miller, president of the H.C. Godman Co., the city's first and largest shoe manufacturer. At the time of its construction, he was the vice president and general manager of that company, co-founded by his father. Miller's wife, Roberta, hosted a reception promoting the Equal Rights Amendment in the residence in 1934, one of the first such events in the state of Ohio. Miller died in 1945, and his wife remarried, rarely used the house while living in New York, and sold it in 1950. In October of the same year, a group of cloistered Carmelite nuns purchased the property and used it as a monastery.

== Monastery of the Immaculate Heart of Mary ==
In 1947, Michael Joseph Ready, the bishop of Columbus, invited Carmelite nuns from Loretto, Pennsylvania to come to the Diocese of Columbus and pray for priests. Six sisters took up residence in a converted garage on September 12 and by 1950 the community had grown to 20 members, necessitating the purchase of the Miller home. The nuns, in addition to daily recitation of the Divine Office and attendance at Mass, manufacturing altar bread and laundered altar linens and vestments. The community lived according to the Rule of Saint Albert and the Constitutions of the Carmelites as written by Teresa of Ávila. The campus also served as a meeting place for the third order of the Carmelites in the Columbus area, and was open to the public for novenas, Masses, Benediction of the Blessed Sacrament, and other prayer services.

=== Carmelite Community ===
In 1975, the monastery opened itself to the public, allowed lay associates and secular clergy to enter, and was re-founded as the Carmel Community by Edward Herrmann. It was granted the canonical status of a pious union on November 22 at St. Joseph Cathedral. Members continued the work of manufacturing altar bread, and also expanded into wine sales. Carmelites affiliated with the group also gave talks and hosted retreats throughout central Ohio. In 1983, the Bexley residence was sold and the community moved to a property on the far East Side near I-270. James Griffin dissolved the community in 1991 due to misconduct by its members.

== Residential use ==
Following its sale by the Carmelites in 1983, the property was purchased and returned to being used as a single-family residence, and added to the National Register of Historic Places two years later. In 1988, John B. McCoy purchased the residence for $1.22 million. In 2014 it was listed for sale at $3.995 million, and described as having five bedrooms, seven full bathrooms and four half-baths.

== See also ==
- National Register of Historic Places listings in Columbus, Ohio
