= Atlas Building =

Historic building in Columbus, Ohio

- Columbus Savings and Trust Building
- U.S. National Register of Historic Places
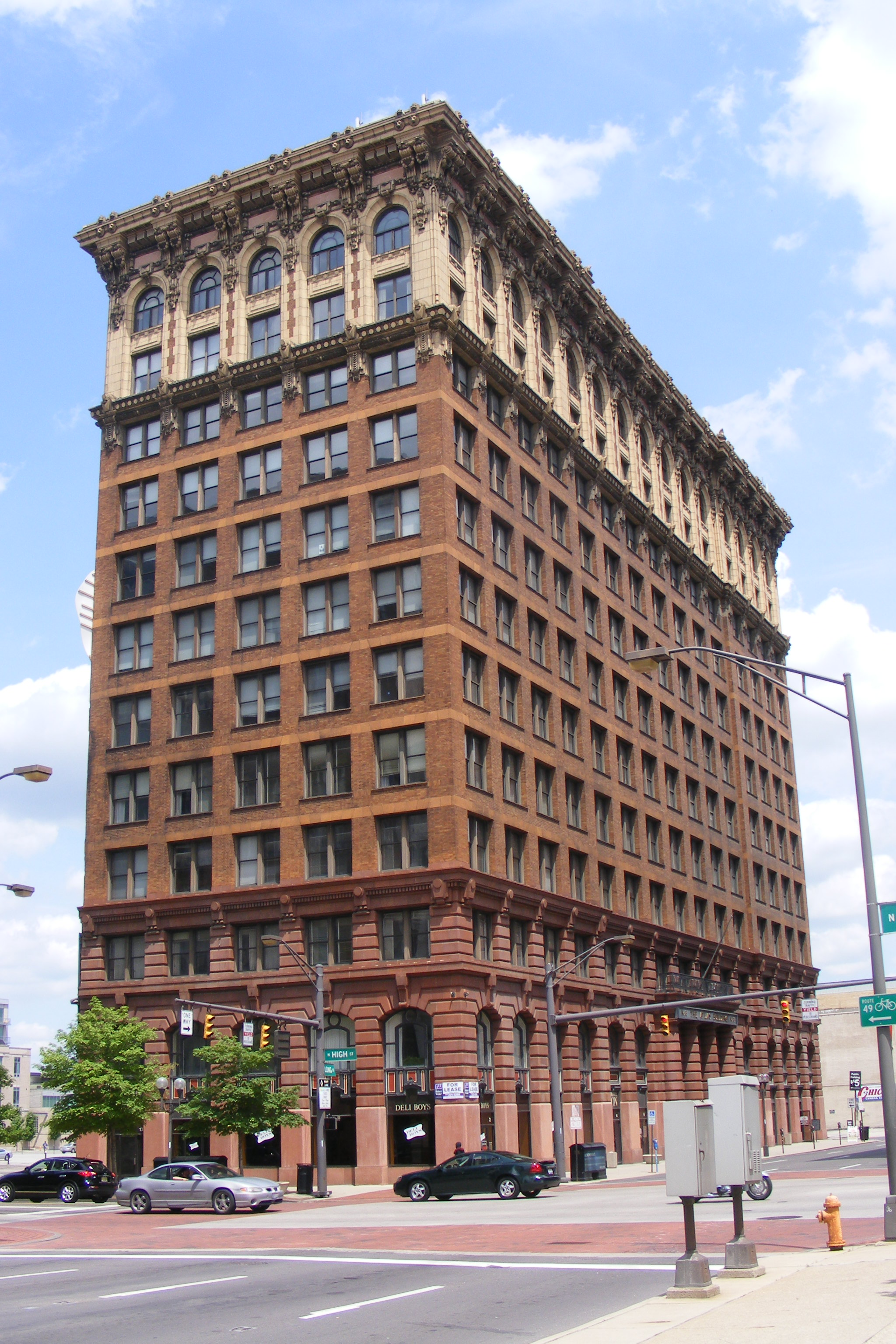
- The Atlas Building in 2010, before its renovation
- Interactive map highlighting the building's location
- Location: 8 E Long Street; Columbus, Ohio
- Coordinates: 39°57′55″N 83°00′03″W
- Built: 1905
- Architect: Frank Packard
- Architectural style: Second Renaissance Revival, Sullivanesque
- NRHP reference No.: 77001060
- Added to NRHP: September 15, 1977

The Atlas Building, originally the Columbus Savings & Trust Building, is a high-rise building in Downtown Columbus, Ohio, built in 1905 and designed by Frank Packard. It was added to the National Register of Historic Places in 1977. The building has seen two major renovations, in 1982 and 2014.

== Attributes ==
The thirteen-story Atlas Building faces Long Street in Downtown Columbus, with its western portion facing High Street, one of the city's two main thoroughfares. The building has ornate features in three distinct segments, topped with an elaborate terra-cotta cornice, typical of skyscrapers of the time.

== History ==
The Atlas Building was designed by prolific Ohio architect Frank Packard. The Building was built for the Columbus Savings & Trust Company, then based in the Spahr Building on Broad Street. Ground was broken for construction in May 1904. The construction project of the building, estimated at $500,000, was awarded to the Chicago-based firm John Griffiths and Son, who completed the building in 1905. After the Columbus Savings and Trust Company filed for bankruptcy, the building was acquired by Depositors Realty Company in 1913. That same year, the Atlas Building served as the original headquarters of the Athletic Club of Columbus. The building was added to the National Register of Historic Places on September 15, 1977.

The Atlas Building underwent renovation from 1979 to 1982 under the direction of architect David C. Hughes, who restored storefronts using precast colored concrete. In 2011, the building was purchased by real estate developer Michael Schiff and in 2014 converted to apartments in a $20 million renovation.

== Gallery ==
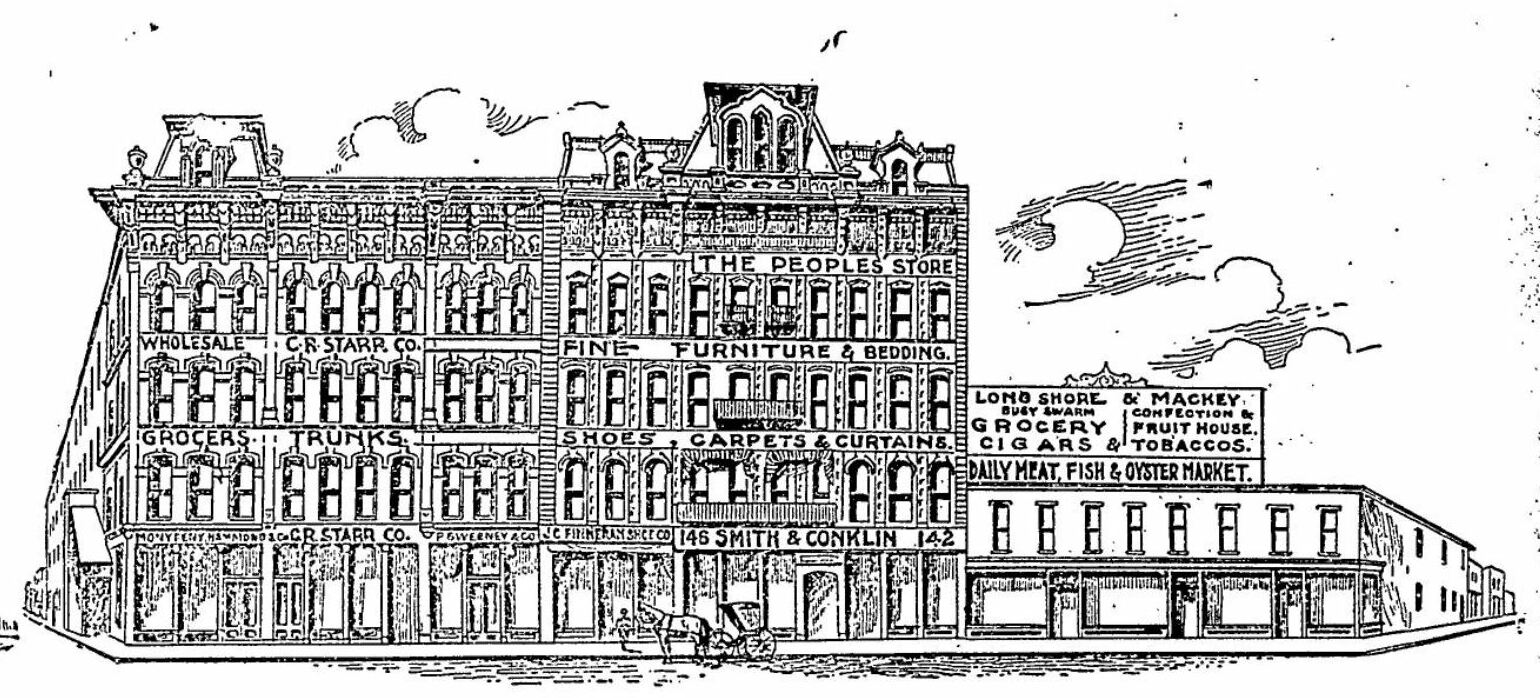
Site of the building in 1895, including the neighboring Monypeny Block building (1878-1970)

C. 1900-1915

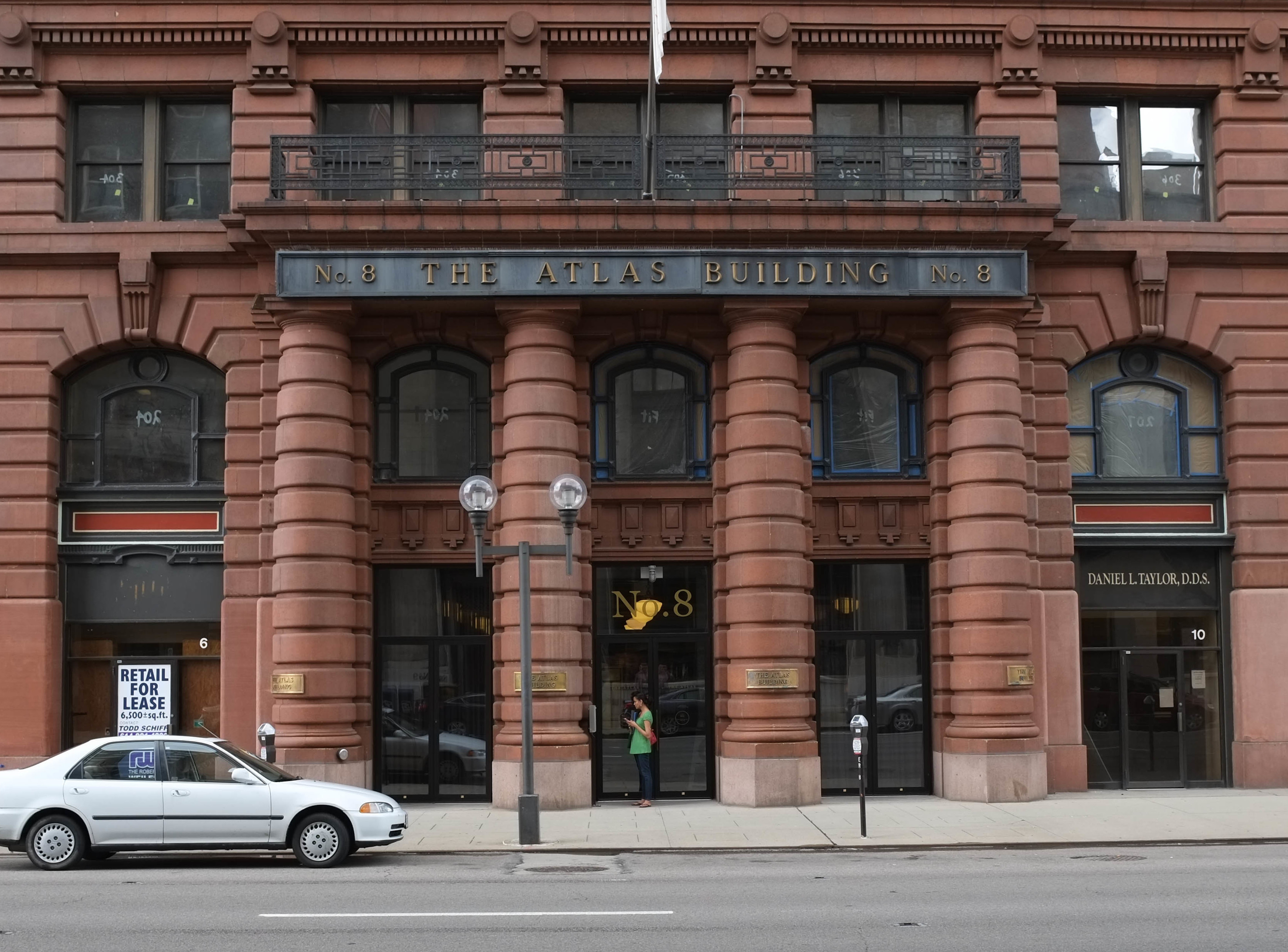
Front entrance

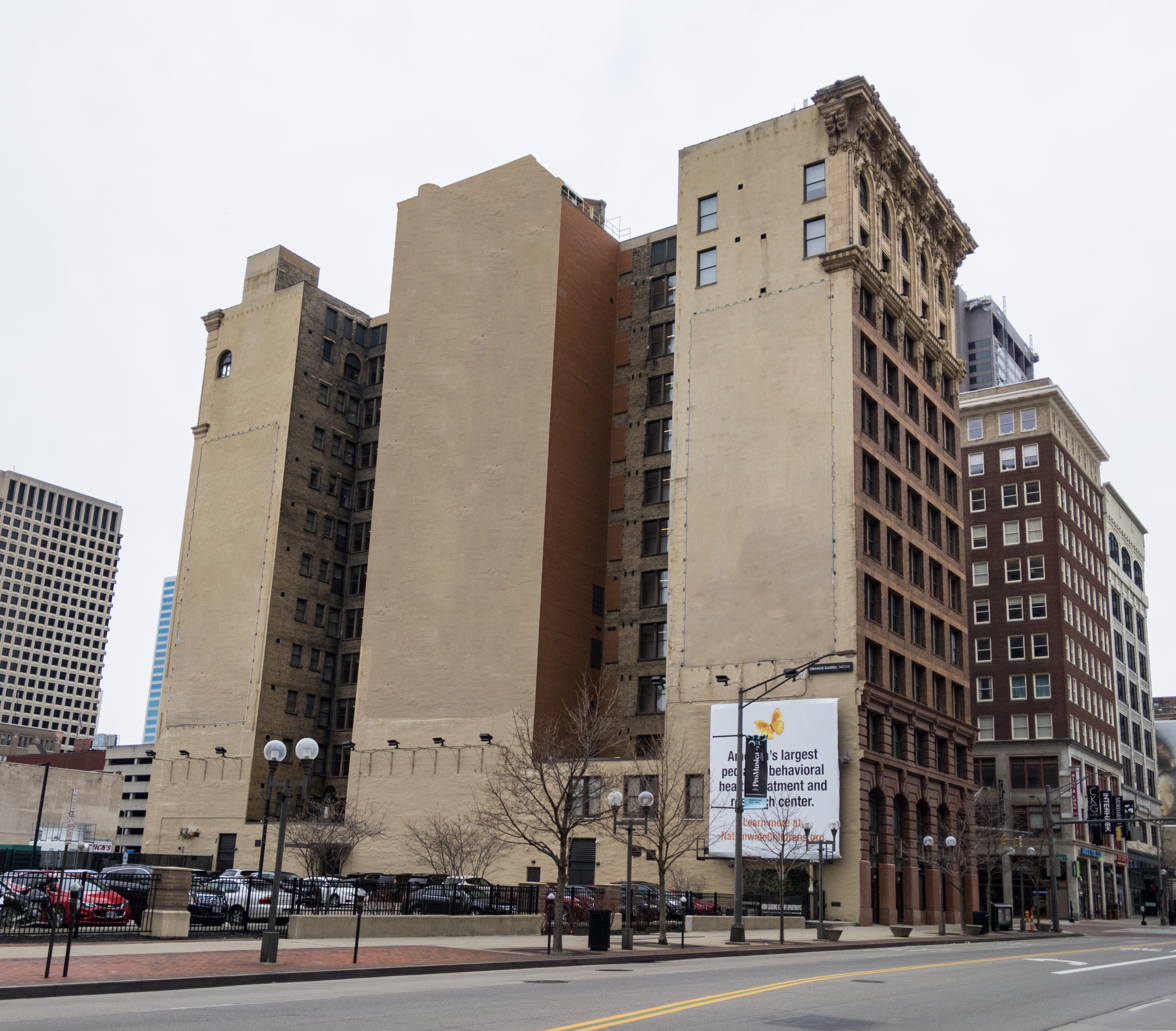
Building reverse

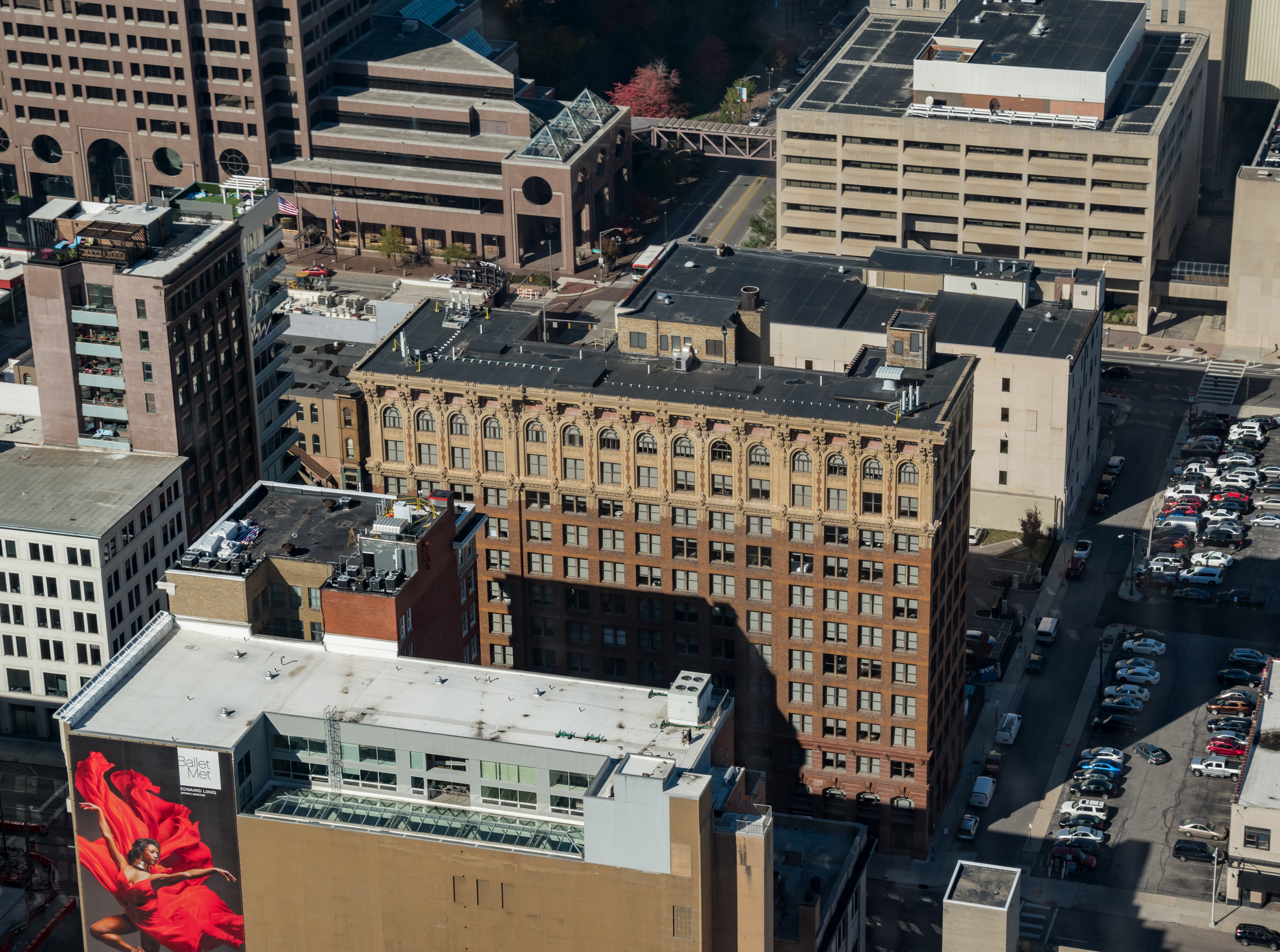
View from the Rhodes State Office Tower

== See also ==
- National Register of Historic Places listings in Columbus, Ohio
