= Johnson-Campbell House =

Historic house in Ohio, United States

- U.S. National Register of Historic Places
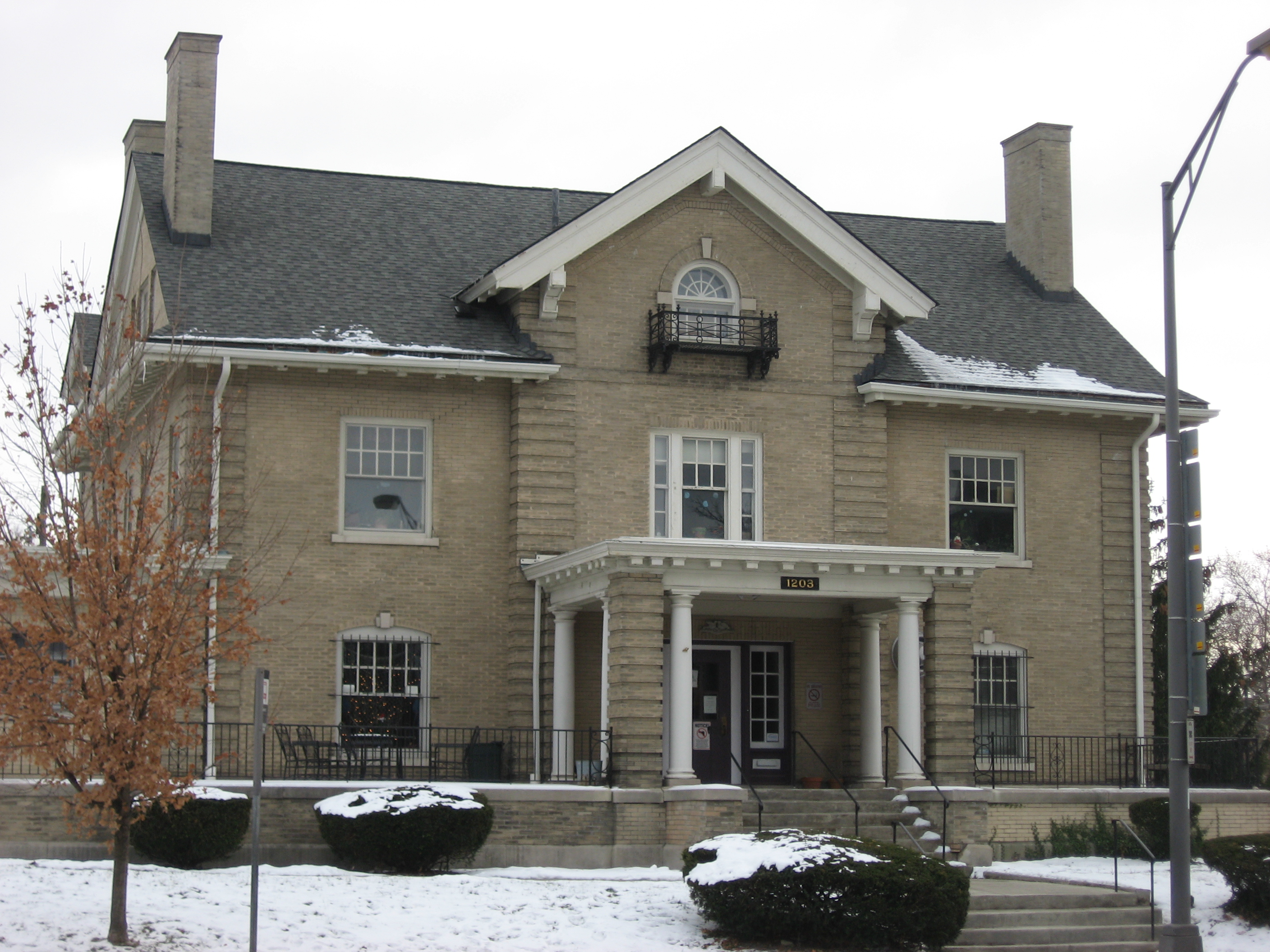
- Interactive map highlighting the building's location
- Location: 1203 E. Broad St., Columbus, Ohio
- Coordinates: 39.965644°N 82.968513°W
- Built: 1906
- Architect: Richards, McCarty & Bulford
- MPS: East Broad Street MRA
- NRHP reference No.: 86003414
- Added to NRHP: December 17, 1986

The Johnson-Campbell House is a historic house in Columbus, Ohio, United States. The house was built in 1906 and was listed on the National Register of Historic Places in 1986. The Johnson-Campbell House was built at a time when East Broad Street was a tree-lined avenue featuring the most ornate houses in Columbus; the house reflects the character of the area at the time.

The house was built in 1906 and designed with Georgian influences by Richards, McCarty & Bulford. It was built for Edward Johnson, president of the Lorain Coal & Dock Co. His family occupied the house until 1912, after which it held the Joseph C. Campbell family, until 1943.

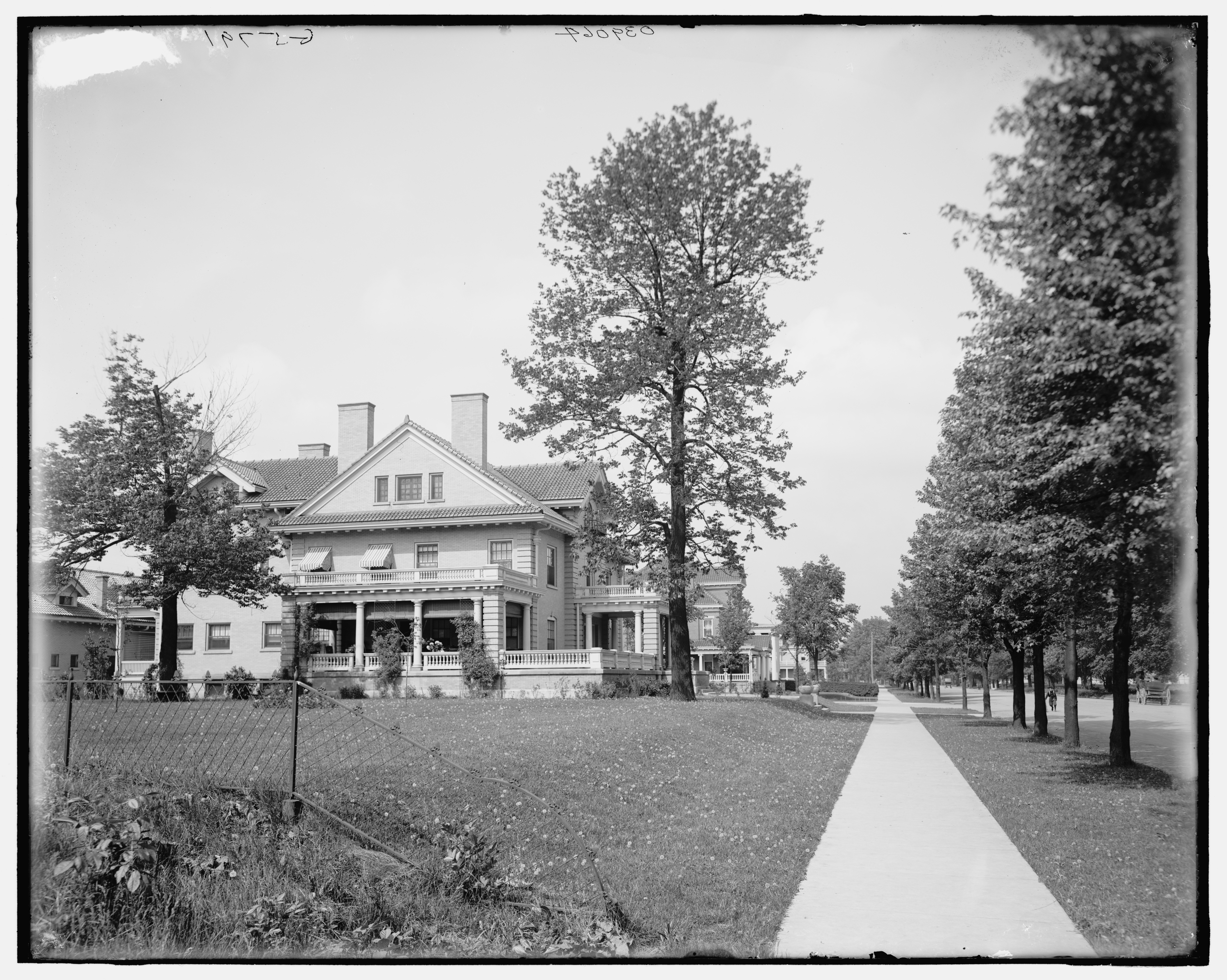
The house c. 1900-1915

== See also ==
- National Register of Historic Places listings in Columbus, Ohio
