= Athletic Club of Columbus =

Private social club

- U.S. National Register of Historic Places
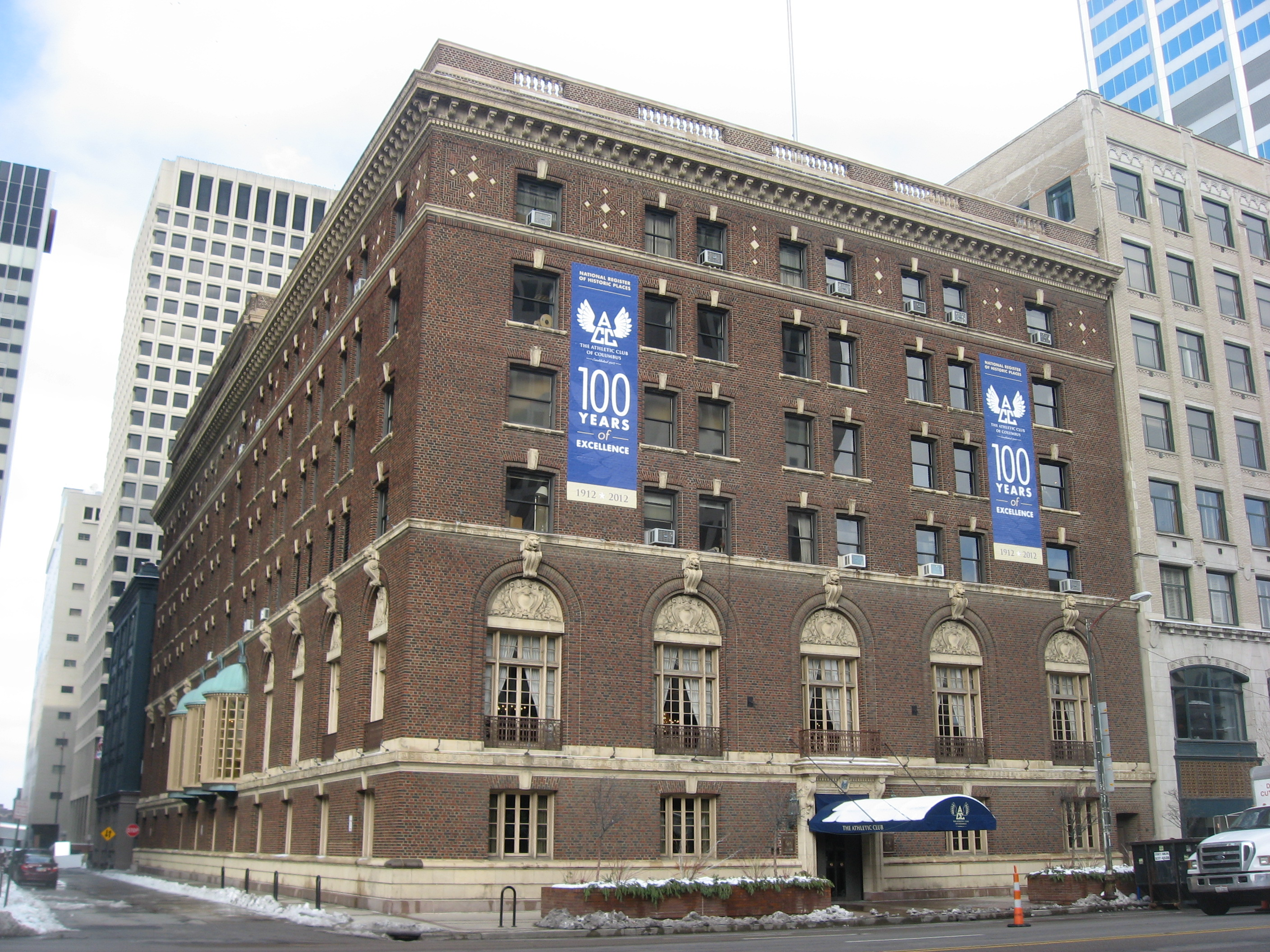
- Front and western side
- Interactive map of Athletic Club of Columbus
- Location: 136 E. Broad St., Columbus, Ohio, U.S.
- Coordinates: 39°57′46″N 82°59′49″W
- Built: 1915
- Architect: Richards, McCarty & Bulford; Frank Packard
- Architectural style: Spanish Renaissance Revival
- NRHP reference No.: 11000711
- Added to NRHP: September 29, 2011

The Athletic Club of Columbus or ACC, is a private social club and athletic club in Downtown Columbus, Ohio. Located at 136 East Broad Street, it was founded in 1912.

== Building ==
The Athletic Club of Columbus was founded in 1912 as a men's club for prominent community members. It was first located in the Atlas Building before moving into its current location on E. Broad Street in 1915.

The building, dedicated in 1915, was designed by Richards, McCarty & Bulford of Columbus with Advisory Architect Frank Packard in the Spanish Renaissance Revival style. The brick and terracotta exterior with windows along three sides was meant to evoke a "distinctive club" feeling. The original plan included billiard and grille rooms, general and private dining rooms, offices, library, bedrooms, swimming pool, exercise rooms, squash courts, gymnasium, track, and roof garden with a covered promenade. While the main entrance was on E Broad Street, the women's entrance was along the western side of the building.

The club occupies a six-story building totaling 88,000 square feet (8,200 m^{2}). The facility includes basketball and squash courts as well as a swimming pool, bowling alley, and three restaurants. The ACC is a family-oriented club that offers a variety of activities to its 2,000 members.

In the 1980s, the club began admitting women members.

In 2011, the club's building was listed on the National Register of Historic Places.

== See also ==
- List of American gentlemen's clubs
- National Register of Historic Places listings in Columbus, Ohio
