= Marion Public Library (Marion, Ohio) =

Coordinates: 40.5873°N 83.1197°W

The Marion Public Library building, is a historic Carnegie library in Marion, Ohio. Funded with a Carnegie Grant in 1905, the public library opened in 1907. The library was designed by Richards, McCarty & Bulford of Columbus, Ohio. The architectural firm also designed the Frank Huber Residence, and the Huber Building, a five-story department store in Marion.

Andrew Carnegie donated $30,000 to build the library. It was designed in the Beaux Arts style. The historic building closed in 1978 and is now part of the Trinity Baptist Church complex.

== New library ==
A newer Marion Public Library was constructed in 1978 on the site of the Greenwood Street School at 445 East Church Street. In 1997 additional construction occurred adding more space on both floors.

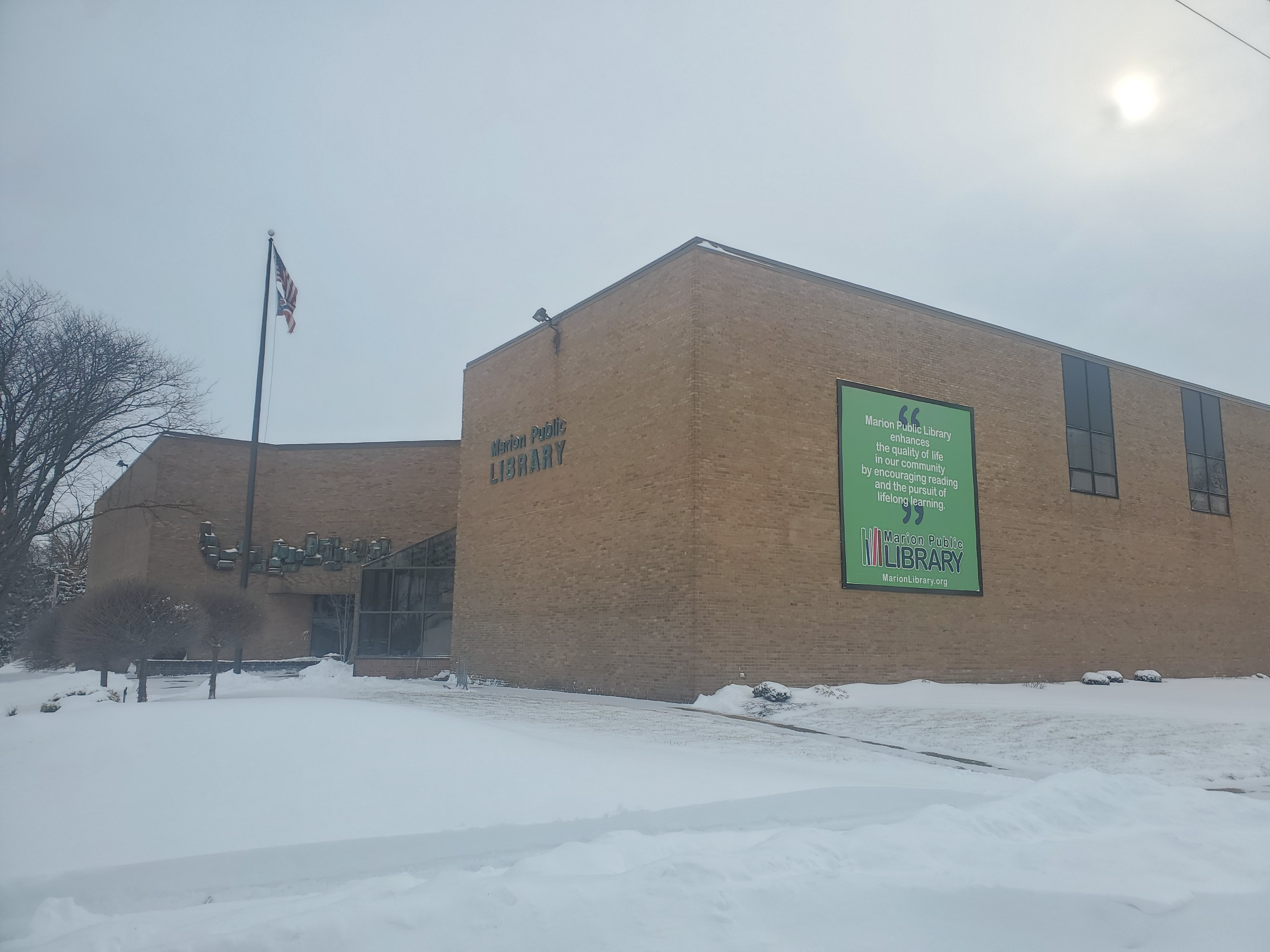

== Library history ==
Industrialist Edward Huber established Marion's first library in 1886, the Mechanics Library. It was a subscription library for his employees and other employers joined in to form a library association. The library was open to the public by 1891 and was funded by a tax levy.

The library was expanded in 1957 and again in 1963. The Carnegie library was purchased by Trinity Baptist Church in 1979 for $125,000 and remodeled.

The Marion Public Library was featured on a postcard.
