= Huber Building =

Historic building in Marion, Ohio, United States

Coordinates: 40°35′20″N 83°7′50″W

The Huber Building is a historic department store building in Marion, Ohio, United States. It was designed by Richards, McCarty & Bulford and constructed in 1903 by famed industrialist Edward Huber. The building contract was for $250,000. A 1909 image was taken from atop the building's elevator tower. Uhler Phillips Company, also known as Uhler's, operated a department store in the building for many years. It was owned by Carrie Fulton Phillips and her husband James Phillips, who left the company following a scandal that linked his wife with Warren G. Harding.

The Huber Building is located at the northwest corner of Center Street and Prospect Street. It includes 54,000 square feet of space, two elevators, a rooftop garden and was home to the C.W. McLain Company department store, which was purchased and became Uhler-Phillips Company, which remained in business for many decades, surviving a scandal that involved its owners and Warren G. Harding.

The building, at 148 West Center Street, is being redeveloped into lofts.

== See also ==
- List of defunct department stores of the United States
- Nan Britton
- National Register of Historic Places listings in Marion County, Ohio
