= Citizens Building (Columbus, Ohio) =

Historic building in Columbus, Ohio

- U.S. Historic district – Contributing property
- Columbus Register of Historic Properties
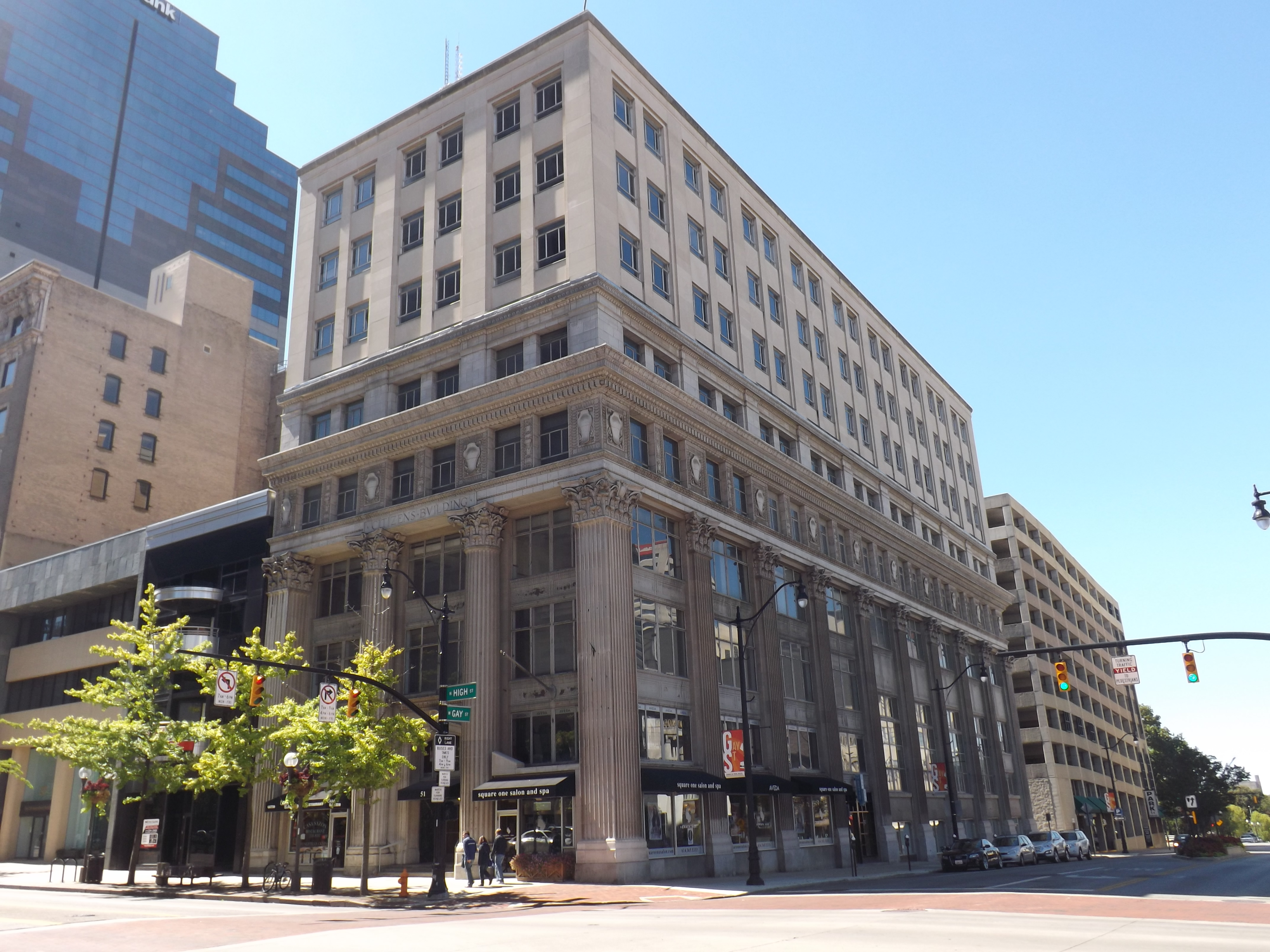
- Location: 51 N. High Street, Columbus, Ohio
- Coordinates: 39.963360°N 83.001399°W
- Built: 1917
- Architect: Richards, McCarty & Bulford
- Part of: High and Gay Streets Historic District (ID14000041)
- CRHP No.: CR-62
- Designated CRHP: September 23, 2013

The Citizens Building is a historic building in Downtown Columbus, Ohio. It was listed on the Columbus Register of Historic Properties in 2013, and was listed as part of the High and Gay Streets Historic District, on the National Register of Historic Places, in 2014.

The building was built in 1917 for the Citizens Trust and Savings Company. It currently houses the Citizens, 63 apartment units managed by Drucker & Falk. It also houses Veritas, one of Columbus's fine dining restaurants, as well as a cocktail bar, The Citizens Trust, run by the same owners. The building also houses the flagship location of Brioso Coffee, which relocated there in 2019.

== See also ==
- National Register of Historic Places listings in Columbus, Ohio
