= Ohio Finance Building =

- U.S. National Register of Historic Places
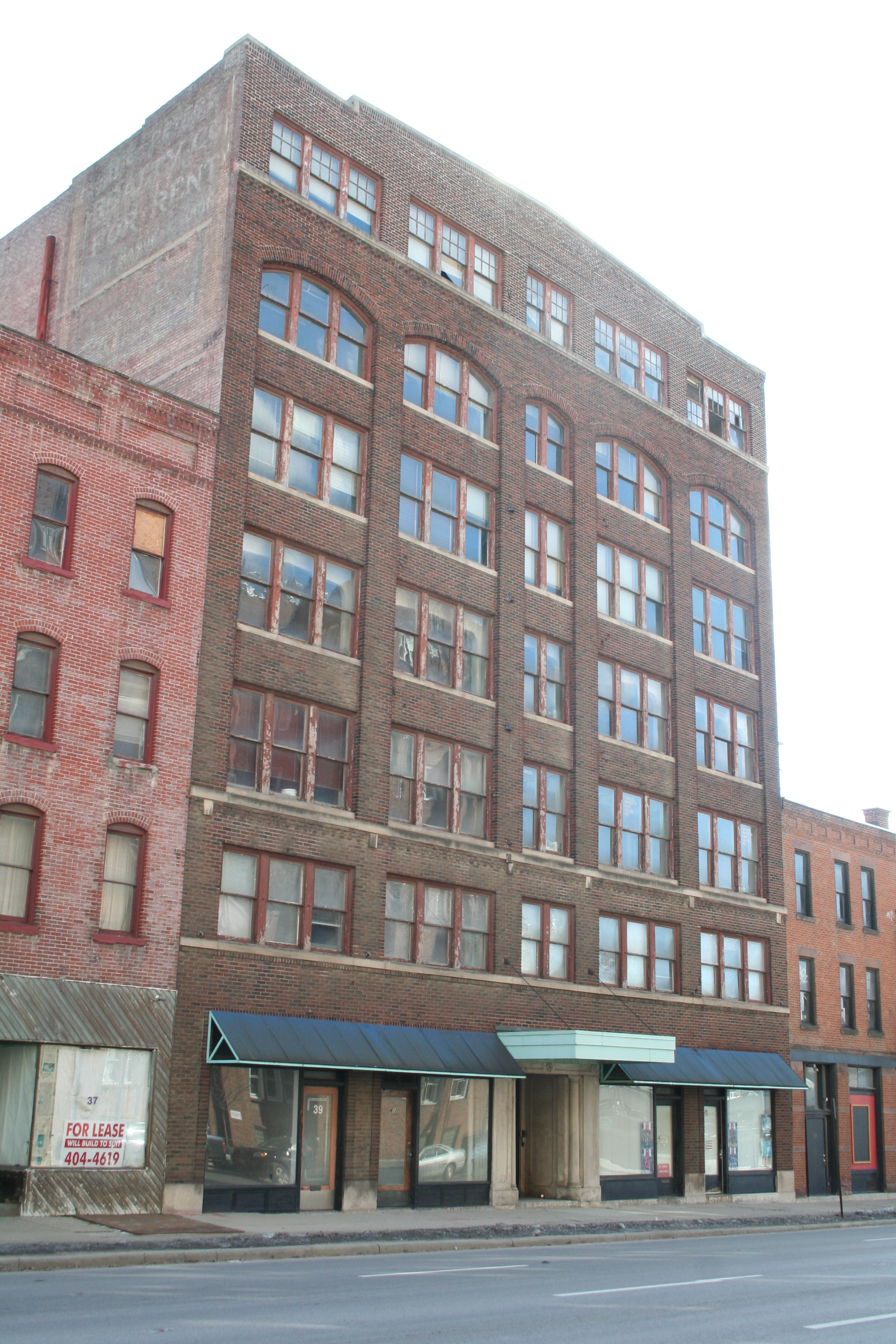
- Exterior in 2014
- Interactive map highlighting the building's location
- Location: 39-47 W. Long St., Columbus, Ohio
- Coordinates: 39.964643°N 83.002453°W
- Built: 1910
- Architectural style: Commercial
- NRHP reference No.: 14000994
- Added to NRHP: December 2, 2014

The Ohio Finance Building is a historic building in Downtown Columbus, Ohio. It was listed on the National Register of Historic Places in 2014.

The seven-story Commercial-style building was completed in 1910, with an unknown architect and builder. Originally known as the Peter Powers Building, it was primarily used for light industrial uses until the early 1920s: machine shops, clothing manufacturers, and printers. As industries left downtown, the building was slowly converted into office space. By 1923, it became known as the Crumrine Building once the Arthur M. Crumrine Co., a large advertising company, acquired offices there. In 1925, the Ohio Finance Company moved into the building and gradually became its sole tenant. In 1954, the Columbus Transit Company began leasing offices there as well, sharing the space with the finance company until 1960, when the Ohio Finance Co. went out of business. The transit company left the space in 1970 (its services replaced by COTA in 1971–74), and the building sat vacant for about fifteen years. It has been used minimally for offices and commercial storefronts since the mid-1980s.

From 2015 to 2020, the building and its neighbors, including the Gaetz Music House building at 49-53 W. Long St. and Rooming House building at 31-37 W. Long St., were renovated to hold apartment units. The $11 million project, known as Microliving at Long & Front, has small apartment units, ranging from 207 to 735 sq ft. The units are the developer's second microliving project, after the nearby Stoddart Block building was completed. The apartment complex opened in June 2020.

== See also ==
- National Register of Historic Places listings in Columbus, Ohio
