= Gaetz Music House =

- U.S. National Register of Historic Places
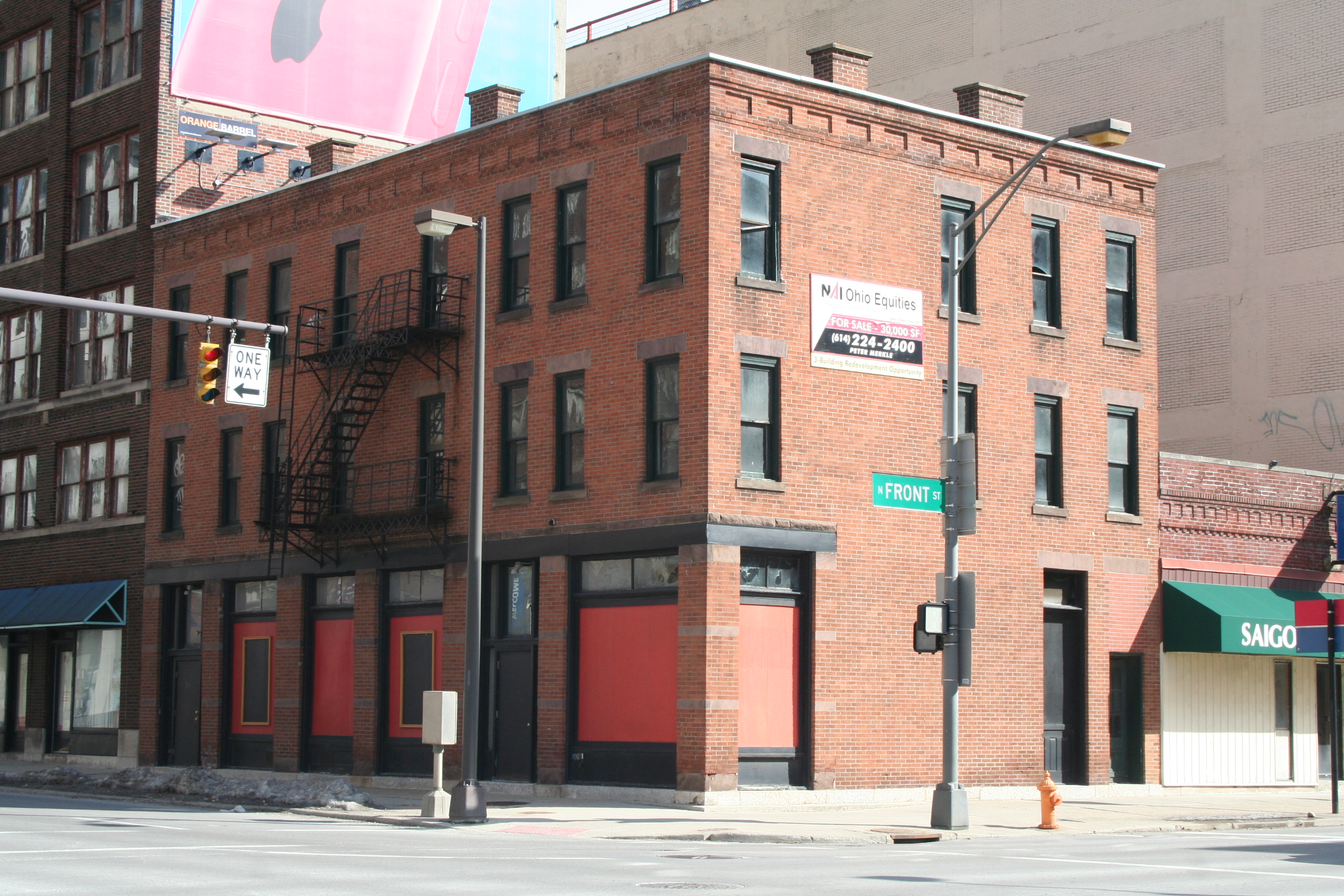
- Exterior in 2014
- Interactive map highlighting the building's location
- Location: 49-53 W. Long St., Columbus, Ohio
- Coordinates: 39.964615°N 83.002681°W
- Built: c. 1885; 141 years ago
- Architectural style: Commercial
- NRHP reference No.: 14000995
- Added to NRHP: December 3, 2014

Gaetz Music House is a historic building in Downtown Columbus, Ohio. It was listed on the National Register of Historic Places in 2014.

The building was constructed c. 1885 in a simplified Commercial style design, with an unknown architect and builder. The building became known for Charles A. Gaetz's wholesale and instrument repair shop, established in 1911 and operating out of the building beginning in 1919. Gaetz purchased the entire building in December 1931. The business operated past his 1957 death, operating via his son, Lloyd F. Gaetz. The business ceased operations in 1972 with Lloyd's death.

Other early tenants included Logan McCormick's art, frame, and photography shop at 49 W. Long, operating until 1930. 51 W. Long housed a grocery store, operated by H.W. O'Neill and later the M.J. Kingry Co., operating until c. 1924. 53 W. Long housed a print and engraving shop owned by F. F. Vance, operating until Gaetz moved into the space in 1919.

From 2015 to 2020, the building and its neighbors, including the Ohio Finance Building at 39-47 W. Long St. and Rooming House building at 31-37 W. Long St., were renovated to hold apartment units. The $11 million project, known as Microliving at Long & Front, has small apartment units, ranging from 207 to 735 sq ft. The units are the developer's second microliving project, after the nearby Stoddart Block building was completed. The apartment complex opened in June 2020.

== See also ==
- National Register of Historic Places listings in Columbus, Ohio
