= Stoddart Block =

- U.S. National Register of Historic Places
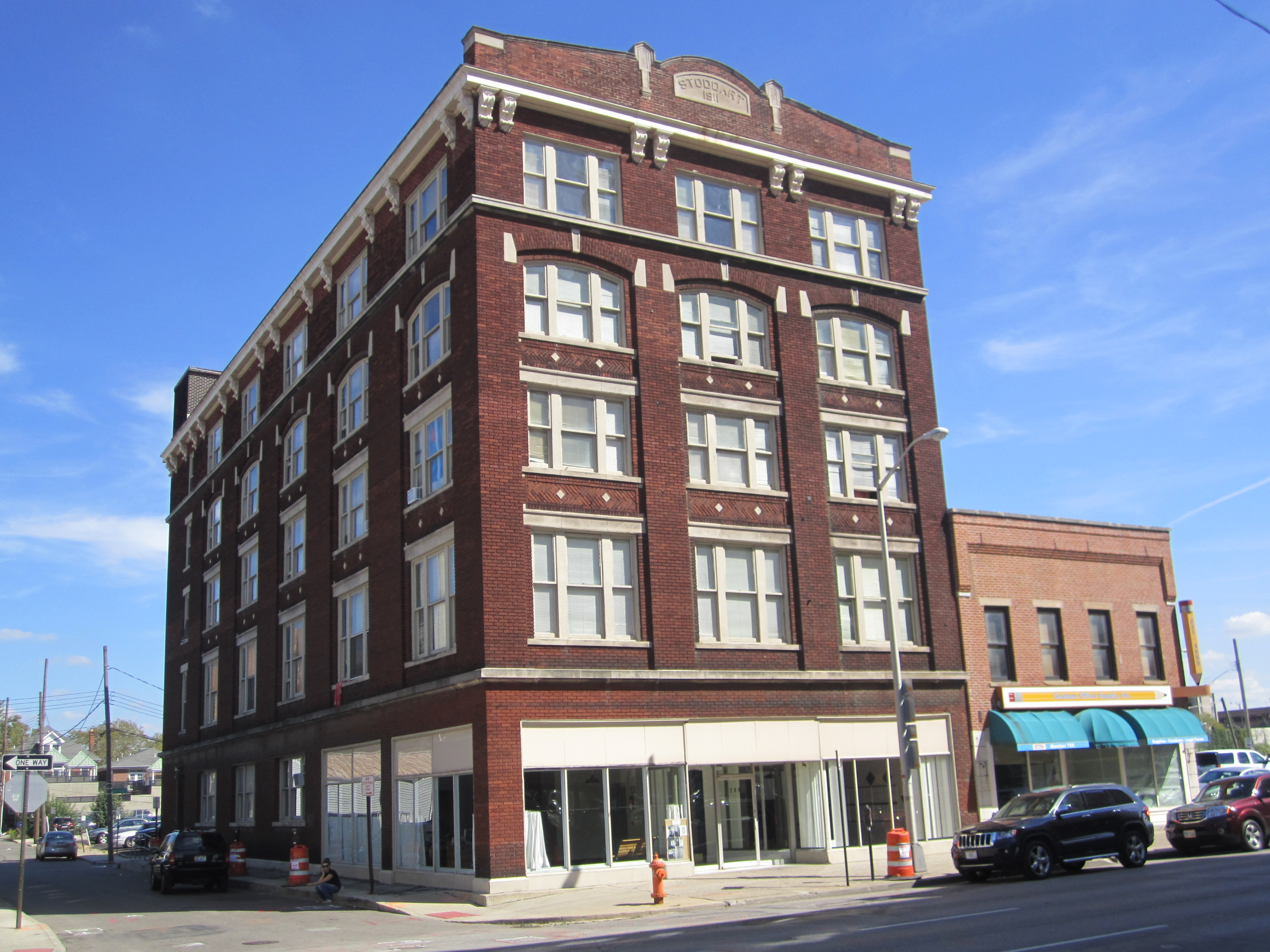
- Interactive map highlighting the building's location
- Location: 260 S. 4th St., Columbus, Ohio
- Coordinates: 39.957236°N 82.994798°W
- Built: 1911
- Architect: David Riebel & Sons
- Architectural style: Commercial
- NRHP reference No.: 94000237
- Added to NRHP: March 17, 1994

The Stoddart Block is a historic building in Downtown Columbus, Ohio. It was listed on the National Register of Historic Places in 1994. The building was constructed in 1911 and designed by the local firm David Riebel & Sons. It was designed for a large furniture store, the Frohock Furniture Company, which operated there until 1938. A second furniture company, Hadley's Furniture Company, occupied the building until 1962. It then operated as the Children's Hospital's thrift shop, from 1962 to 1990. By 2014, the building held 52 low-income apartments. It was renovated into affordable micro-apartments at this time.

The building has five stories. It has a red brick exterior, flat roof, and steel-reinforced concrete structure. It has three bays on its west side and six on its north. A stone panel above the top floor reads "Stoddart 1911". By 1994, the only alterations affected the storefront level.

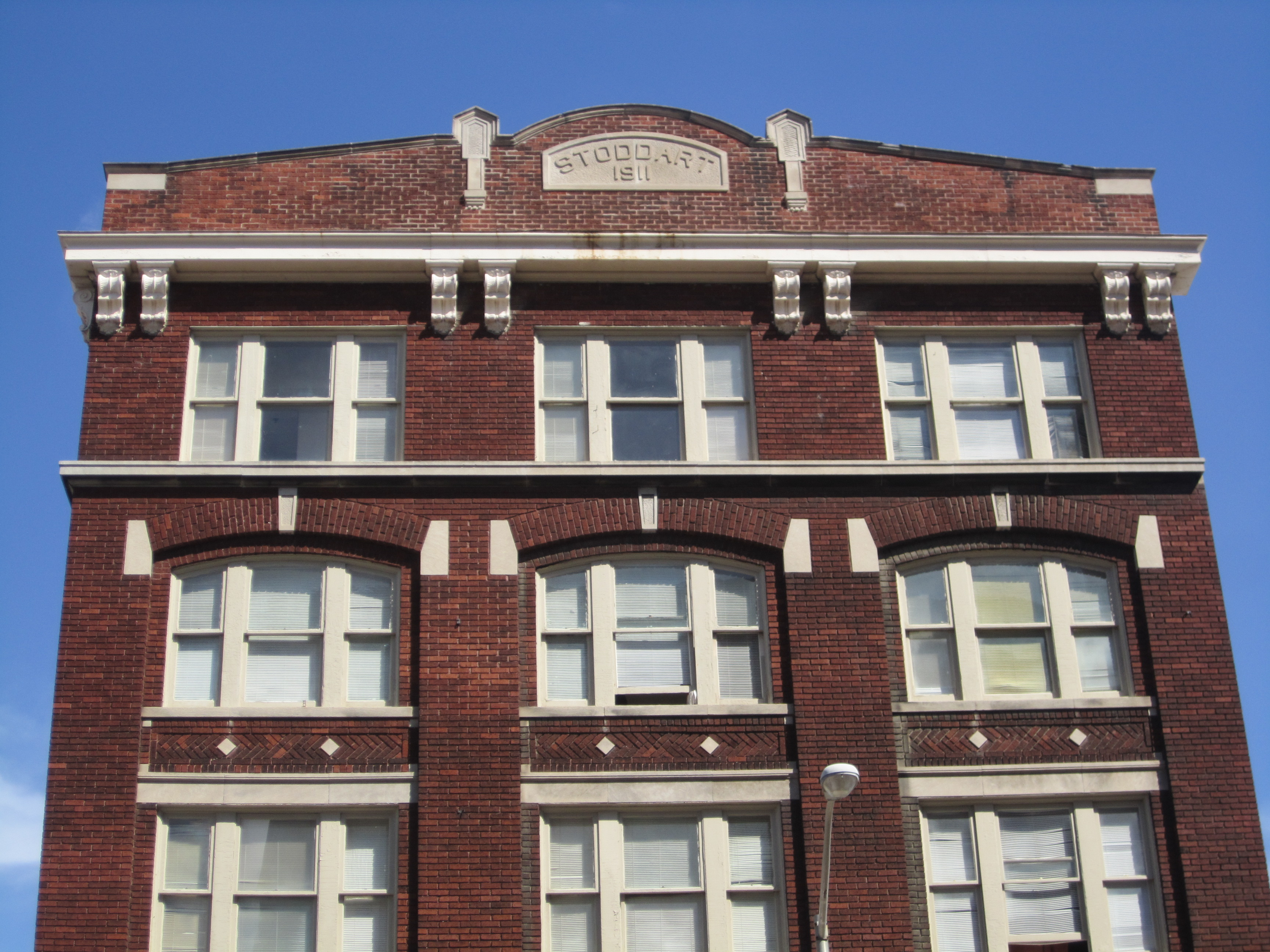
Detail on the west facade

== See also ==
- National Register of Historic Places listings in Columbus, Ohio
