= Huntington National Bank Building =

Bank and office building in Columbus, Ohio

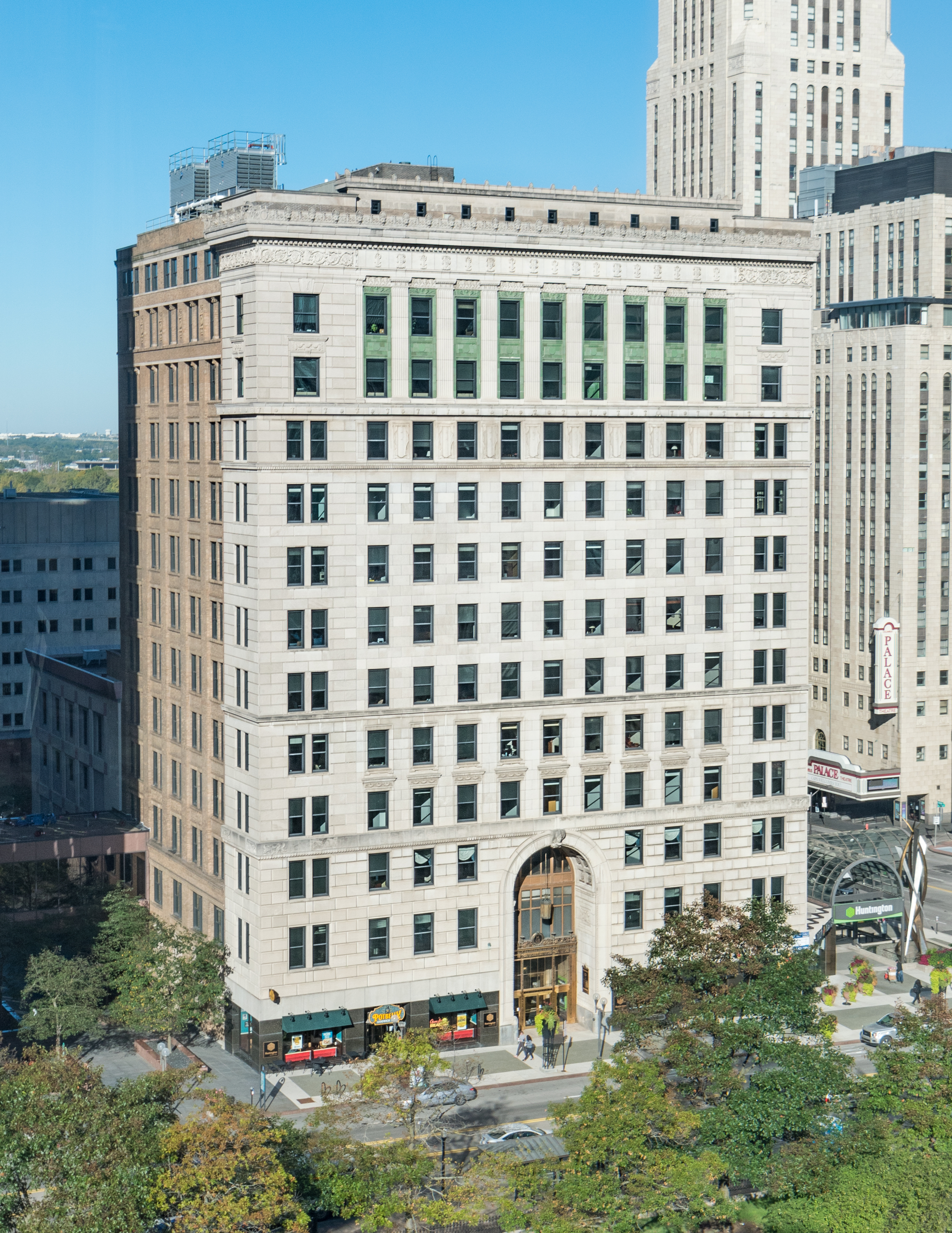
- East (main) facade on High Street
- Interactive map of the Huntington National Bank Building area

General information
- Architectural style: Second Renaissance Revival
- Location: Columbus, Ohio, 17 South High Street
- Coordinates: 39°57′42″N 83°00′04″W
- Completed: 1926

Height
- Height: 168 ft (51 m)

Technical details
- Floor count: 13

Design and construction
- Architect: Snyder & Babbitt

The Huntington National Bank Building is a bank and office building on Capitol Square in Downtown Columbus, Ohio. Once the headquarters to Huntington Bancshares, it now includes the company's primary lending bank, the Capitol Square Branch. It is part of the Huntington Center complex, which also contains the Huntington Center skyscraper, Huntington Plaza, and DoubleTree Hotel Guest Suites Columbus.

The building envelops the twelve-story Harrison Building at 21 South High Street, built in 1903. Huntington Bank's offices moved there from their old building nearby, at the southwest corner of Broad and High, in 1916. In 1925, with limited space for the quickly-growing bank, it built around the Harrison Building, incorporating it into the significantly larger Huntington National Bank Building. The original southern facade of the Harrison Building is still visible from High Street.

The building was designed by Snyder & Babbitt in the Second Renaissance Revival style. The main, east-facing facade uses fine-grained limestone, with a large central entranceway, multiple belt course, and decorative cornice. The style matches the new building with the old Harrison Building. During construction of the Huntington Center next-door, the architect, added a modern stucco pattern to the 1926 building's then-plain brick west facade, mirroring its east facade.

The building features a large banking lobby, taking up most of the first floor. The room features original banking counters, tellers' cages, decorated ceiling, and intricate elevator doors.

The building held the offices of Frederick W. Schumacher, a philanthropist who led the Peruna Drug Manufacturing Company and was an arts patron, and who owned the Frederick W. Schumacher mansion in the city.

== Gallery ==
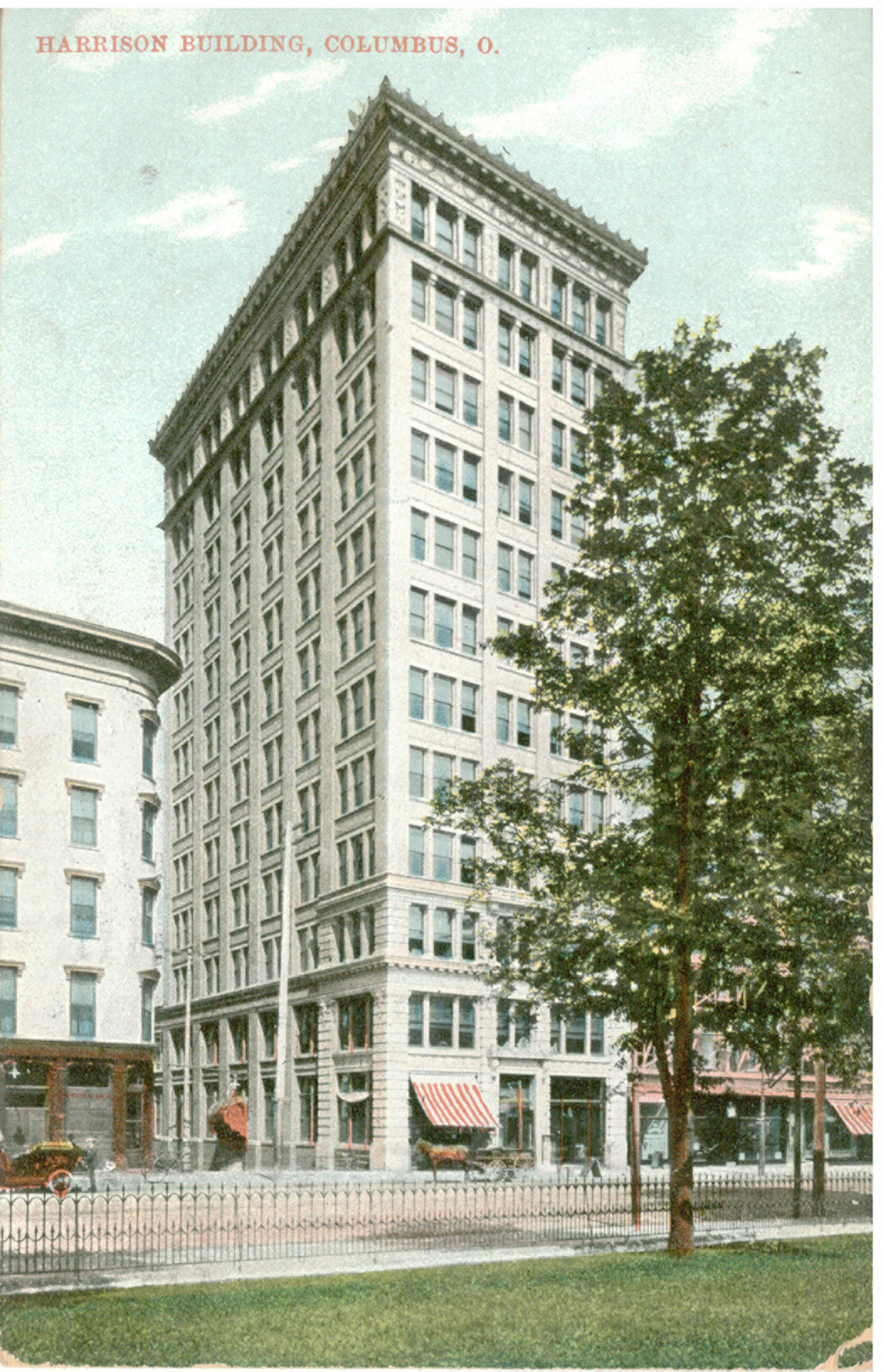
The Harrison Building c. 1907

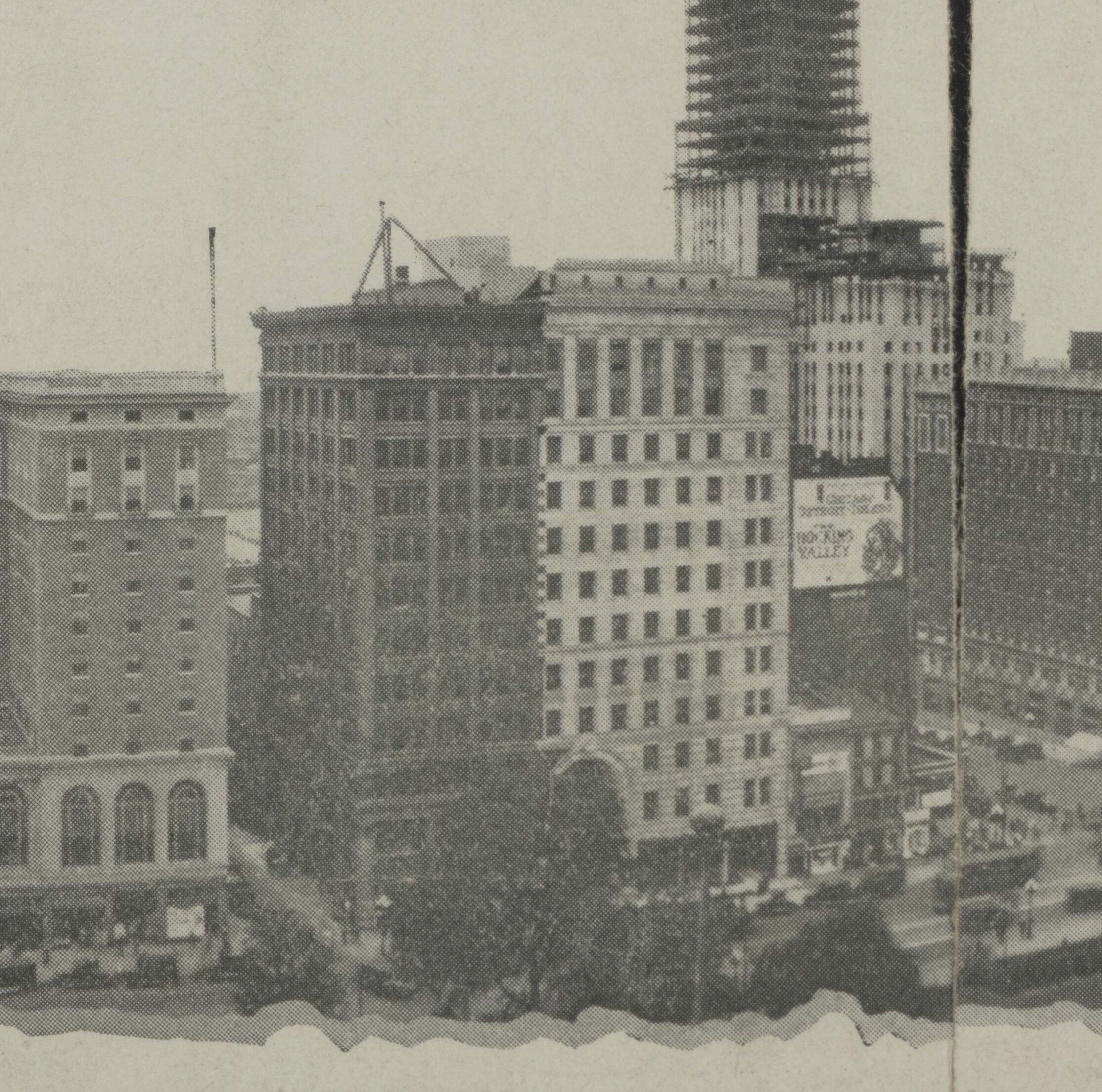
Converting the Harrison Building in the mid-1920s

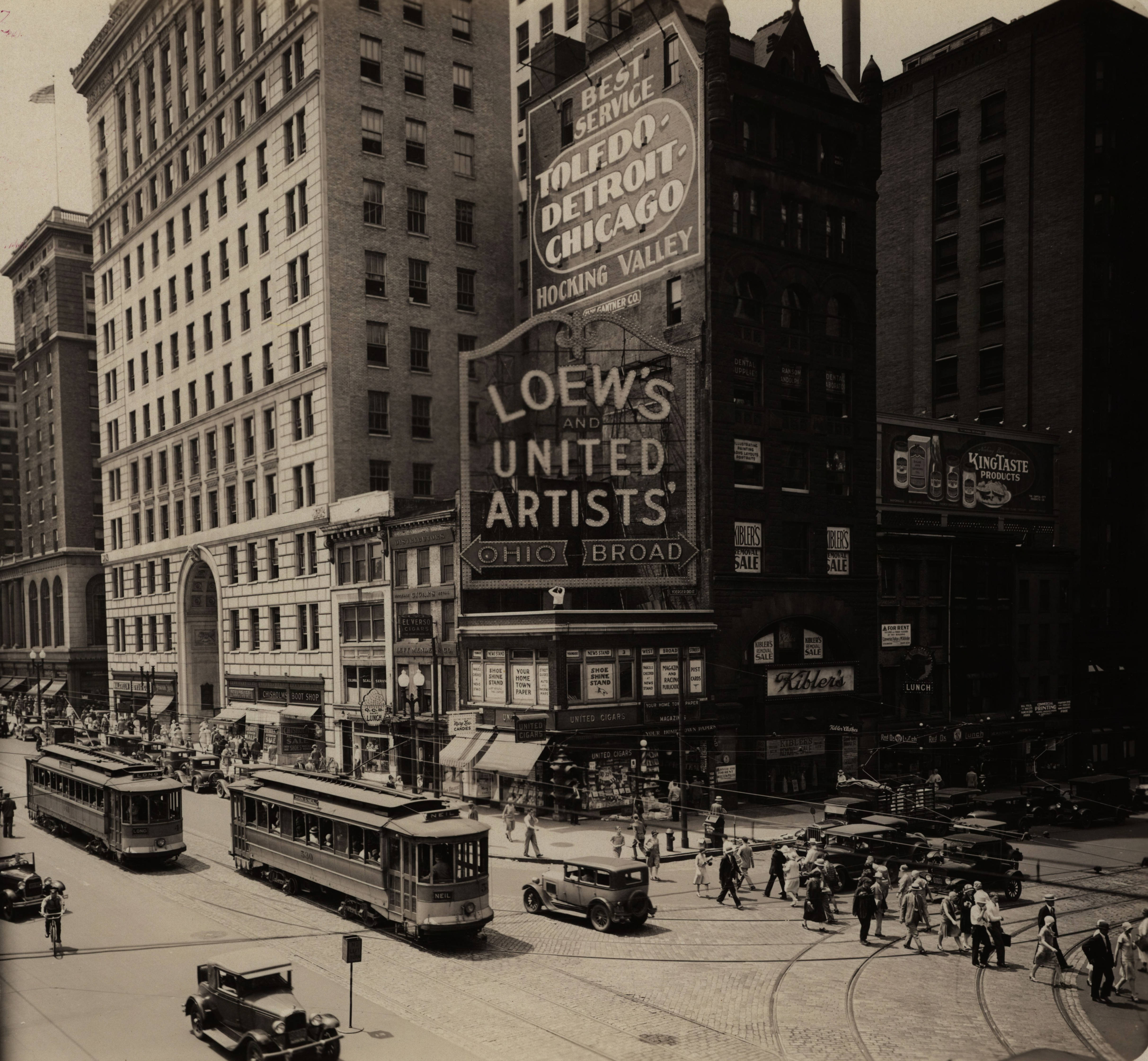
The bank building in the early 20th century

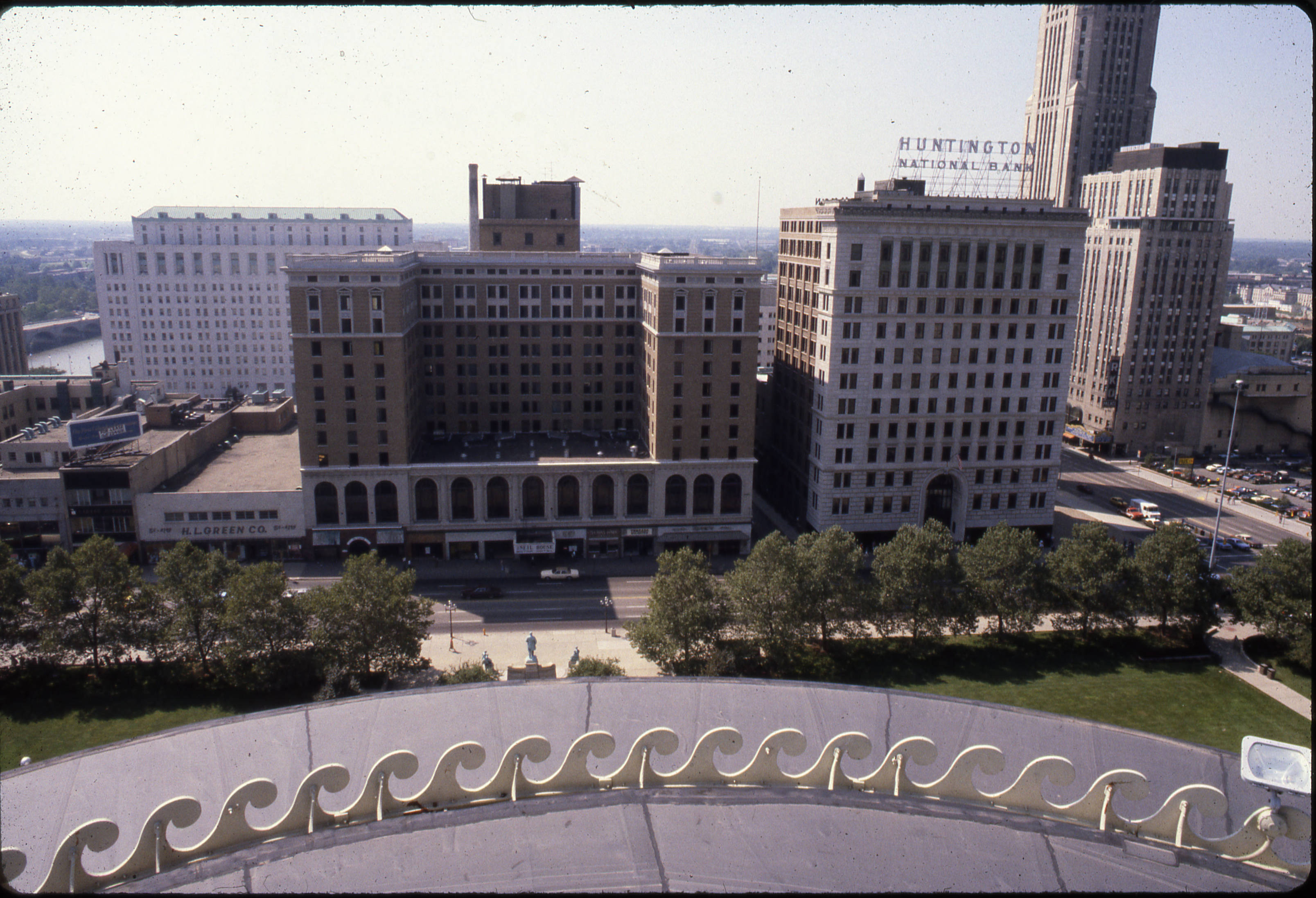
Huntington Bank building by the Neil House hotel in the 1980s
