= Hartman Hotel =

- U.S. National Register of Historic Places
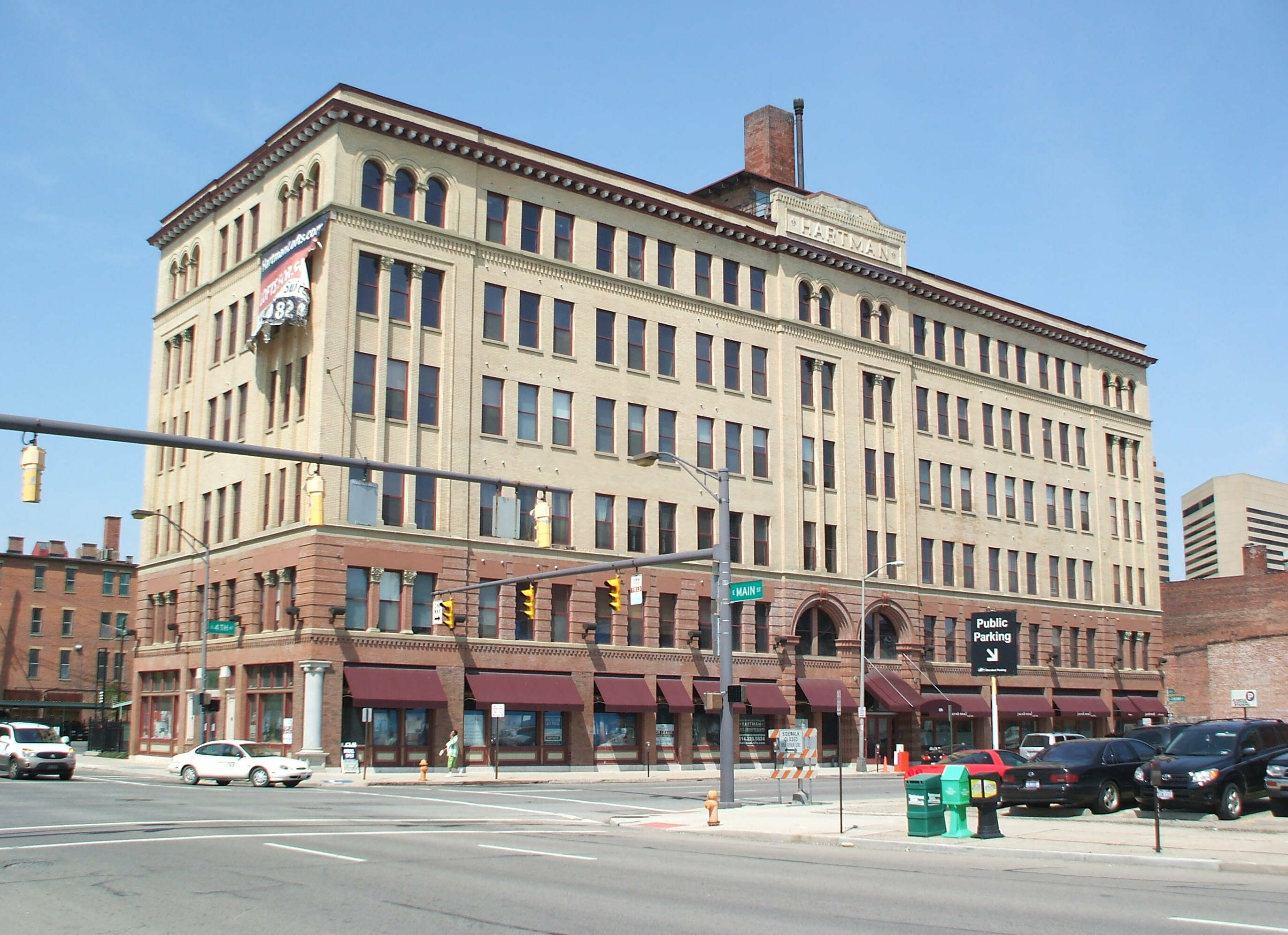
- Interactive map highlighting the building's location
- Location: 275 S. 4th and 150 E. Main Sts., Columbus, Ohio
- Coordinates: 39.956980°N 82.995447°W
- Built: 1898
- Architect: Kremer & Hart
- Architectural style: Neoclassical
- NRHP reference No.: 100002877
- Added to NRHP: September 4, 2018

The Hartman Hotel is a condominium complex and former hotel and office building in Downtown Columbus, Ohio. The building was completed in 1898 and was listed on the National Register of Historic Places in 2018.

The six-story Neoclassical building was designed by the local firm Kremer & Hart. It operated as the Pe-Ru-Na Company headquarters from 1898 to 1902, when it became the Hartman Hotel. The hotel closed in 1921, and the building began to house Ohio governmental agencies. Most of these departed in 1933, though the building maintained offices until 1992. It stood vacant from 1992 to 1999, when it was renovated and restored. Another renovation took place from 2005 to 2008, creating condominiums on much of the building's floor space.

== History ==
The building was designed as an office building, housing the headquarters of the Pe-Ru-Na (or Peruna) Company. The company, owned by Samuel Brubaker Hartman, grew to encompass large areas of the city. Hartman's holdings included another office building, a downtown factory and administration building, a surgical hospital, a theater, and his own mansion. Today, only the Hartman Hotel remains. The building opened as the Hotel Hartman in November 1902, and included a restaurant, ballroom, gymnasium, ladies' parlor, smoking room, and elaborate sixth-floor dining room. Around 1905, Hartman replaced the gymnasium with his own bank, the Market Exchange Bank. Hartman died in the building in 1918, and the hotel closed three years later.

From 1906 to 1909, the building had served as the official residence of the governor of Ohio, Andrew L. Harris. Until 1919, governors chose houses, hotels, or rented spaces to act as their residence in the state capital. After the hotel's closure, the state of Ohio decided to lease the building to consolidate its scattered state departments, and the hotel became known as the Ohio Building.

The Ohio Building served Ohio's Industrial Commission, Commission for the Blind, State Library of Ohio, and the departments of Health, Highways, Insurance, and Industrial Relations. These offices remained in the hotel building until 1933, when the Ohio Departments Building opened, further consolidating department spaces. Nevertheless, some state agencies continued to use spaces in the buildings for further decades, the last moving out in the early 1970s. The Huntington National Bank purchased the building and its bank branch in the early 1960s, operating until 1992. The building then became vacant and fell into disrepair. A developer renovated the building in 1999, restoring original details and adding a modern glass staircase at the building's rear.

The hotel building was renovated further from 2005 to 2008, adding residential condominiums to floors two through six. The building is now known as the Hartman Loft Condominiums. It was listed on the National Register of Historic Places in 2018.

== See also ==
- National Register of Historic Places listings in Columbus, Ohio
