= Rainey Bennett =

American artist, illustrator and muralist

- Born: June 14, 1907; Marion, Indiana
- Died: July 26, 1998 (aged 91); Chicago, Illinois
- Education: School of the Art Institute of Chicago; Art Students League of New York; University of Chicago
- Occupations: Water-colorist, muralist, commercial artist, illustrator, teacher, author
- Employer: University of Illinois at Chicago
- Organization: University of Chicago
- Style: Social Realism

Rainey Bennett (June 14, 1907 – July 26, 1998) was an American artist, illustrator and muralist. His works have been displayed in major museum art collections.

== Work ==
The art collections of Metropolitan Museum of Art and the Museum of Modern Art in New York include some of Rainey's artwork. The Hirshhorn Museum and Sculpture Garden in Washington, DC contains a watercolor, Lake Maracaibo, Venezuela, 1952, as part of its permanent collection. The Art Institute of Chicago has three of Bennett's pieces in its collection.

=== Illustrator ===
In addition to his painting, Bennett also worked as a freelance book illustrator and had a longtime working relationship with Scott Foresman publishers. Every holiday season, he illustrated the daily Christmas newspaper ads for Marshall Field's. In 1960, Bennett wrote as well as illustrated his own children's book, The Secret Hiding Place, about a baby hippopotamus in search of a secret hiding place.

=== Murals ===
Murals were produced from 1934 to 1943 in the United States through the Section of Painting and Sculpture, later called the Section of Fine Arts, of the Treasury Department. In 1938 Bennett painted oil on canvas murals for the post offices in Dearborn, Michigan titled Ten Eyck’s Tavern on Chicago Road and Rushville, Illinois titled Hart Fellows - Builder of Rushville. In 1941, he painted an oil on canvas mural for the Naperville, Illinois post office titled, George Martin's Home Overlooking Old Naper Hill. He painted a 13 panel mural for the Neil House Hotel in Columbus, Ohio. The building was destroyed to make way for the Huntington Center and the whereabouts of the panels are unknown.

=== Paintings ===
The Oak Room at Robert Allerton Park contains four floral paintings by Rainey Bennett, who was a friend of the Allerton family. He painted oil painting for the Chicago & Northwestern Railroad Exec Offices. new Deal/WPA bios

=== Watercolors ===
In 1939, Bennett produced a series of 36 watercolors of Venezuela on commission of the Stanford Oil Company and Nelson Rockefeller, who purchased 24 of the paintings after a two-year traveling tour as an exhibit of the Museum of Modern Art. In 1940, the watercolors were shown at the prestigious Downtown Gallery in New York. They are currently part of the collection of the St. Louis Art Museum. Another commission from Rockefeller for paintings of other South American countries followed in 1949.

== Death ==
Bennett died on December 11, 1998, in his Lincoln Park home at the age of 91. His wife, Ann, was a professional dancer and had died in 1975. He was survived by his companion, two daughters, and a son.

== Exhibits ==
- Downtown Gallery, New York
- Art Institute of Chicago; Art in Illinois, In Honor of the Illinois Sesquicentennial, June/September, 1968, Quiet Blue
- University of Illinois, Exhibit of Contemporary American Painting, Feb-April, 1949; , Pamela and Renee
- Cleveland Museum;
- Toledo Museum;
- Whitney Museum;
- Fairweather Hardin Gallery, Chicago.

== See also ==
- Gray, Mary Lackritz. A Guide to Chicago's Murals. Chicago and London: University of Chicago Press, 2001.
- Sokol, David. Rainey Bennett. Exh. cat. Chicago: University of Illinois at Chicago Circle, 1979.
