= Herbert A. Linthwaite =

American architect

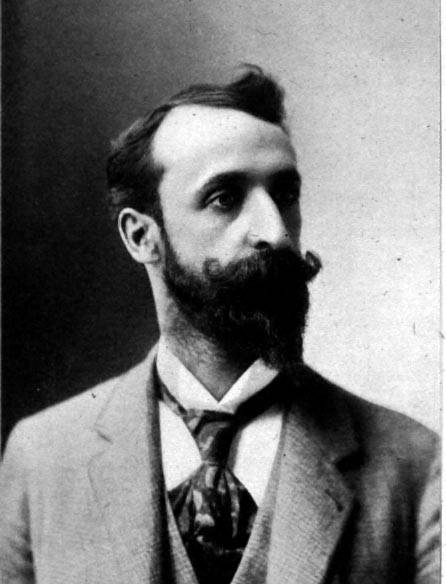
- Lithwaite portrait
- Born: June 17, 1858; Indiana, USA
- Died: December 31, 1929 (aged 71); Los Angeles, California, USA
- Occupation: Architect
- Awards: Linthwaite and Holbrook (1906-1907)
- Buildings: Garber House

Herbert A. Linthwaite (June 17, 1858, Indiana – December 31, 1929, Los Angeles) was an American architect and a member of the AIA Columbus. Born in Indiana, Linthwaite rose to prominence as an architect in Columbus, Ohio from 1879 to 1911, when he moved to Los Angeles. In 1922, he built the Garber House; it became a Los Angeles Historic-Cultural Monument in 2007. He married Sara De Long in September 1879 and died in Los Angeles in 1929.

== Notable works ==
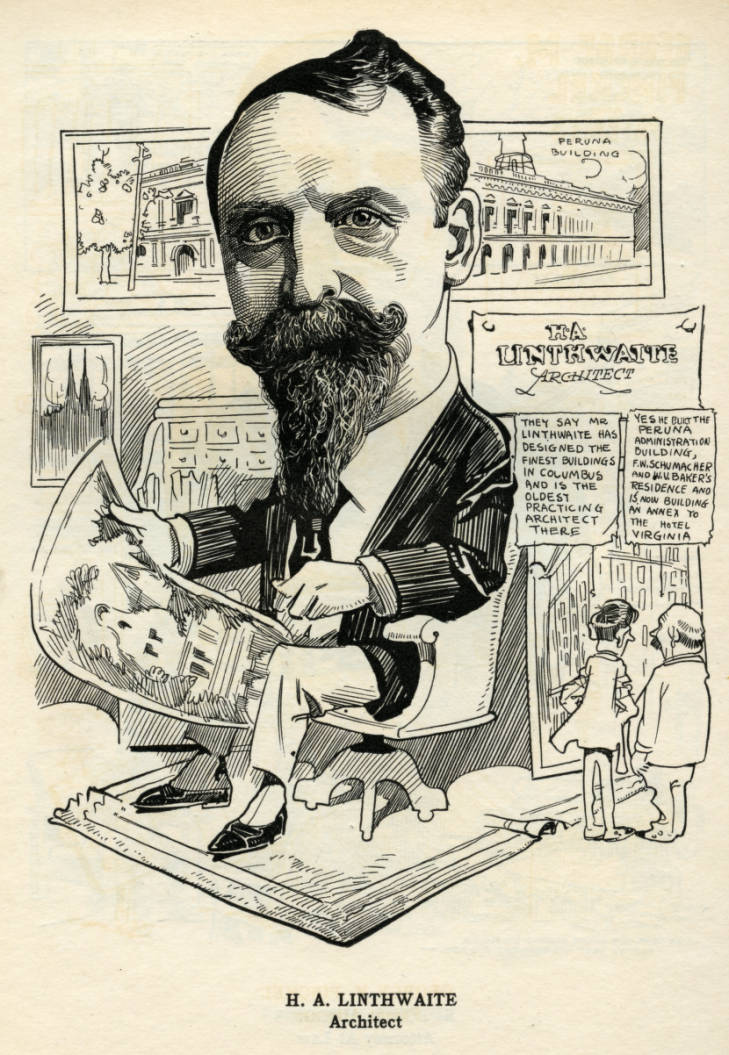
Caricature of Linthwaite

- Old Columbus Dispatch Building, Columbus Ohio - 68 North High Street. Completed in 1910. The building housed the Columbus Dispatch, the city's daily newspaper, until 1925.
- Frederick W. Schumacher mansion
- Garber House - Los Angeles, California
- The Peruna Drug Manufacturing Company Building - Columbus, Ohio
- The Central Ohio Paper Company - Columbus, Ohio
- The Columbus Female Benevolent Society building
- Fred Lazarus mansion - 1080 Bryden Road, Columbus, Ohio
