= Huntington Plaza =

Office building in Columbus, Ohio

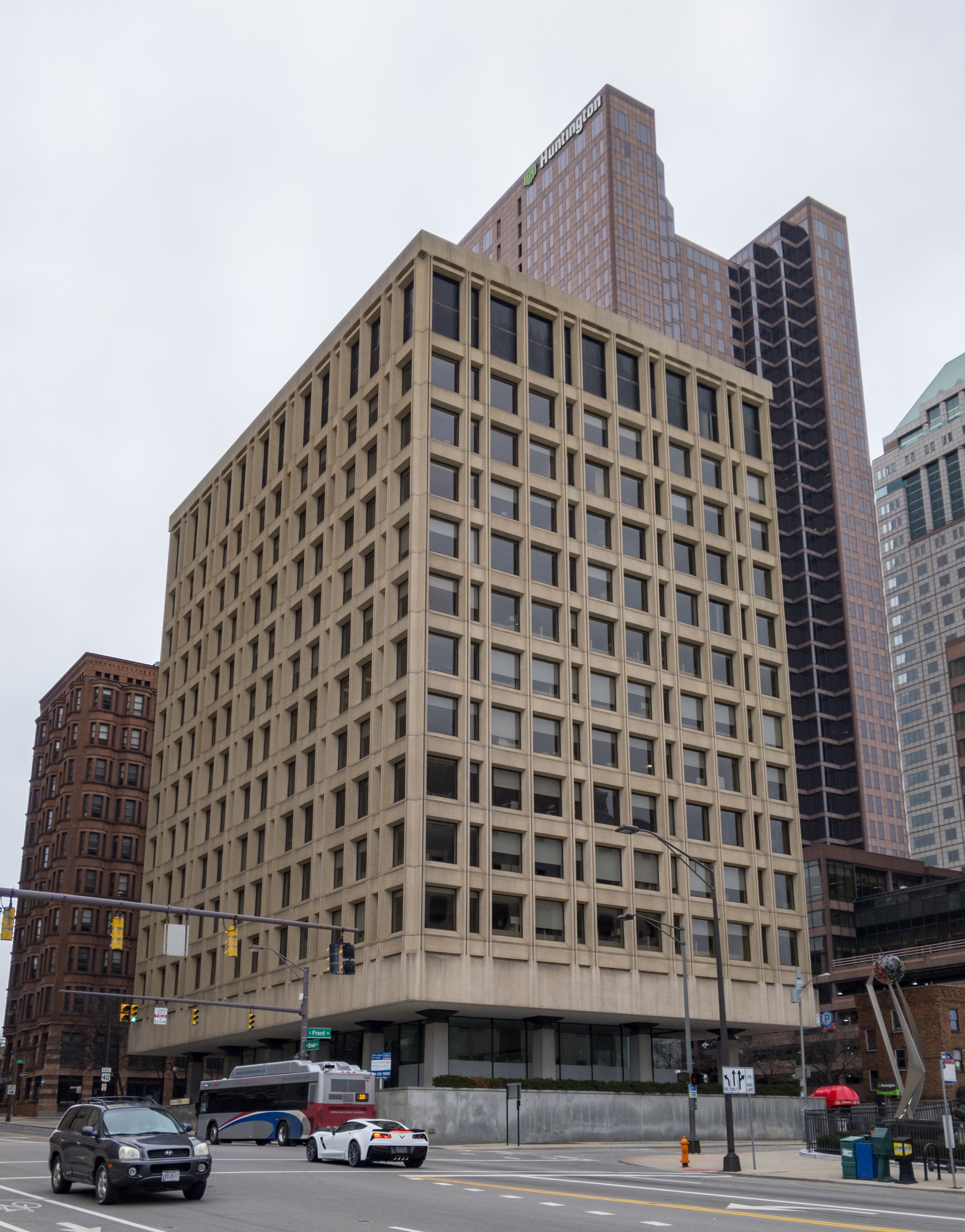
- View southeast from Broad Street
- Interactive map of the Huntington Plaza area

General information
- Architectural style: Brutalism
- Location: Columbus, Ohio, 37 W. Broad Street
- Coordinates: 39°57′42″N 83°00′07″W
- Completed: 1965

Height
- Height: 171 ft (52 m)

Technical details
- Floor count: 12

Design and construction
- Architects: Skidmore, Owings & Merrill; Benham, Richards & Armstrong

Huntington Plaza, formerly the Huntington Trust Building, is an office building in Downtown Columbus, Ohio. It is owned by Huntington Bancshares, and is part of the Huntington Center complex, which also contains the Huntington Center skyscraper, the Huntington National Bank Building, and DoubleTree Hotel Guest Suites Columbus.

The building was built by Skidmore, Owings & Merrill, the same firm that designed the Huntington Center, the PNC Bank Building, and Chase Tower in downtown Columbus. Benham, Richards & Armstrong, a firm from Columbus, contributed to the design.

The building, one of the earliest contemporary buildings around Capitol Square, was built for Huntington's mortgage subsidiary and other tenants. The building was built on a plaza that levels out the site, which slopes down towards the Scioto River. The plaza is at street level on the east side and about one story above street level on the west side. The east side of the building has a small, shaded park. The building has a glassy lobby recessed behind structural columns. The bulk of the building appears to hover above the lobby, cantilevered out from it. Its facades utilize concrete grids around large windows.

The building replaced the James Building, which was built in 1921. The James Building was known for the James Theatre, which was renamed Loew's Broad Theater in 1927. The cinema was Columbus's first elaborate movie theater. It closed and was razed in 1961 to make way for the new office building.

The building has held the offices of Ohio politicians Mike DeWine, George Voinovich, and Jo Ann Davidson. The building also housed the field office of politician Rob Portman. A protest aimed toward Portman took place in the building's lobby in 2017, in which 16 people were arrested. A protest in the building in 2002 caused 10 arrests; the protesters were unable to meet with Mike DeWine over U.S. foreign policy in Colombia.

In 1985, the building was renovated and renamed as Huntington Plaza Building, due to the bank's trust department no longer being housed in the building. The renovations included sandblasting the exterior and creating park space around the building. Before then, the space beside the building was used for drive-through banking services.

The building under construction, April 1965
