= Huntington Center (Columbus, Ohio) =

Skyscraper on Capitol Square in downtown Columbus, Ohio

Coordinates: 39.961154°N 83.000942°W

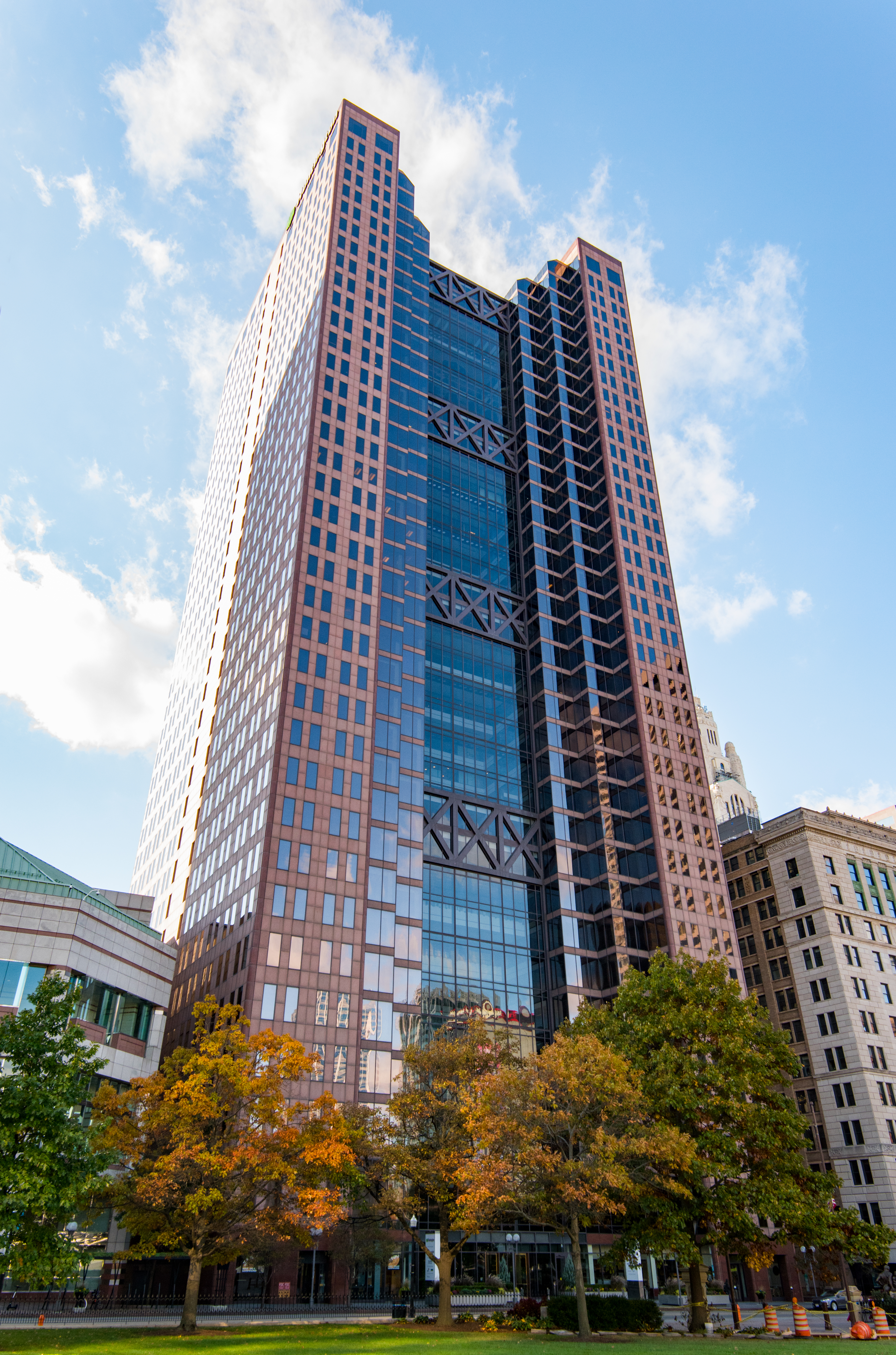
- Interactive map of the Huntington Center area

General information
- Classification: Office
- Location: Columbus, Ohio, 41 South High Street
- Completed: 1986
- Opening: May 16, 1985

Height
- Height: 512 ft (156 m)

Technical details
- Floor count: 37

Design and construction
- Architect: Skidmore, Owings & Merrill
- Main contractor: Dugan & Meyers Construction Company

Website
- www.41southhigh.com

The Huntington Center is a skyscraper on Capitol Square in downtown Columbus, Ohio. The building is 512 feet (156 m) tall and has 37 floors. It is the fourth tallest building in Columbus, and the tallest constructed in the 1980s. It was largely completed in 1984, though finishing touches were still being added into 1985. The building opened on May 16, 1985.

The building is part of a complex by the same name, which also contains Huntington Plaza, DoubleTree Hotel Guest Suites Columbus, and the Huntington National Bank Building.

The Huntington Center replaced the Neil House, a hotel that operated on the site from 1842 to 1980.

== See also ==
- List of tallest buildings in Columbus
