= Garber House (Los Angeles) =

English Tudor Revival building by architect Herbert A. Linthwaite

- Location: 6060 Scenic Avenue, Los Angeles, California
- Coordinates: 34.11023°N 118.321971°W
- Built: 1922
- Architect: Herbert A. Linthwaite
- Architectural style: English Tudor Revival

Los Angeles Historic-Cultural Monument
- Designated: June 5, 2007
- Reference no.: 874

The Garber House in Los Angeles, California, is an English Tudor Revival building by architect Herbert A. Linthwaite, AlA that was built in 1922 and listed as a Los Angeles Historic-Cultural Monument in 2007. The Cultural Heritage Commission found the building "embodies the distinguishing characteristics of an architectural type specimen, inherently valuable for a study of a period style or method of construction" as an example of Tudor Revival residential architecture in the Hollywood area.

Linthwaite is noted for inventing a type of construction method for concrete buildings in the 1920s: the "hollow concrete wall." Possessing exclusive rights to build with this system, Linthwaite used this method in several buildings in Los Angeles during this time period.

== Design ==
The primary façade facing the street is asymmetrically composed. It includes an off-center arched vestibule and groupings of triple casement windows. The roof is a single dominant front gable with half-timbered verge boards. Adjacent to the house and located on the property is a two-story, gabled roof garage built in 1939 with a residential unit on the second floor. It features a smooth stucco finish, Gothic-style plaster details, and triple casement windows. The Cultural Heritage Commission found The Garber House "exhibits character-defining features that include brick wall cladding, half timbering, and wood trim. The arched entryway features a recessed two-panel door with multi-paned glass in a semi-oval shape. The steeply pitched gabled roof also has three gable dormers and two centered chimneys. The interior features open beamed ceilings, brushed tile, wooden floors, and built-in cabinetry."

Garber House was commissioned by Winifred Garber, who lived at the property with her daughters. The Garber family were important in the development of Los Angeles, because of their active, vocal contribution to the editorial pages of the Los Angeles Times during the 1920s and 1930s.

== English Tudor Style in Hollywood ==
The first Tudor Revival buildings in the United States were built in the late 1890s. In Los Angeles, the first Tudor style buildings were built in the early 1900s, and the style became popular throughout the 1920s and 1930s, especially in suburban areas.

The Tudor Revival style is an architectural style that grew out of the 19th century movement away from the "modern" industrial revolution and towards a more "romantic" historicism. The style is based on English cottages of the late Medieval and early Renaissance period (16th and early 17th centuries). The English Revival Cottage is a smaller version of the Tudor with brick walls instead of stucco and less half-timbering.

English Tudor Revival is a common style in Beachwood Park, adjacent to Hollywoodland. The development was originally intended to be a gated community with strict architectural regulations. It was one of the first case-study real-estate developments. Initially, the development had four approved architectural styles, French Normandy, English-Tudor, Mediterranean revival, and Spanish revival. The developers hired noteworthy Spanish and Mediterranean revival architect Jon DeLario as lead architect for the development. He designed many of the original homes, most of which are still intact today.

== See also ==
- Los Angeles Historic-Cultural Monuments in Hollywood
- Tudor Revival architecture
- Beachwood Canyon, Los Angeles
