= Frederick W. Schumacher =

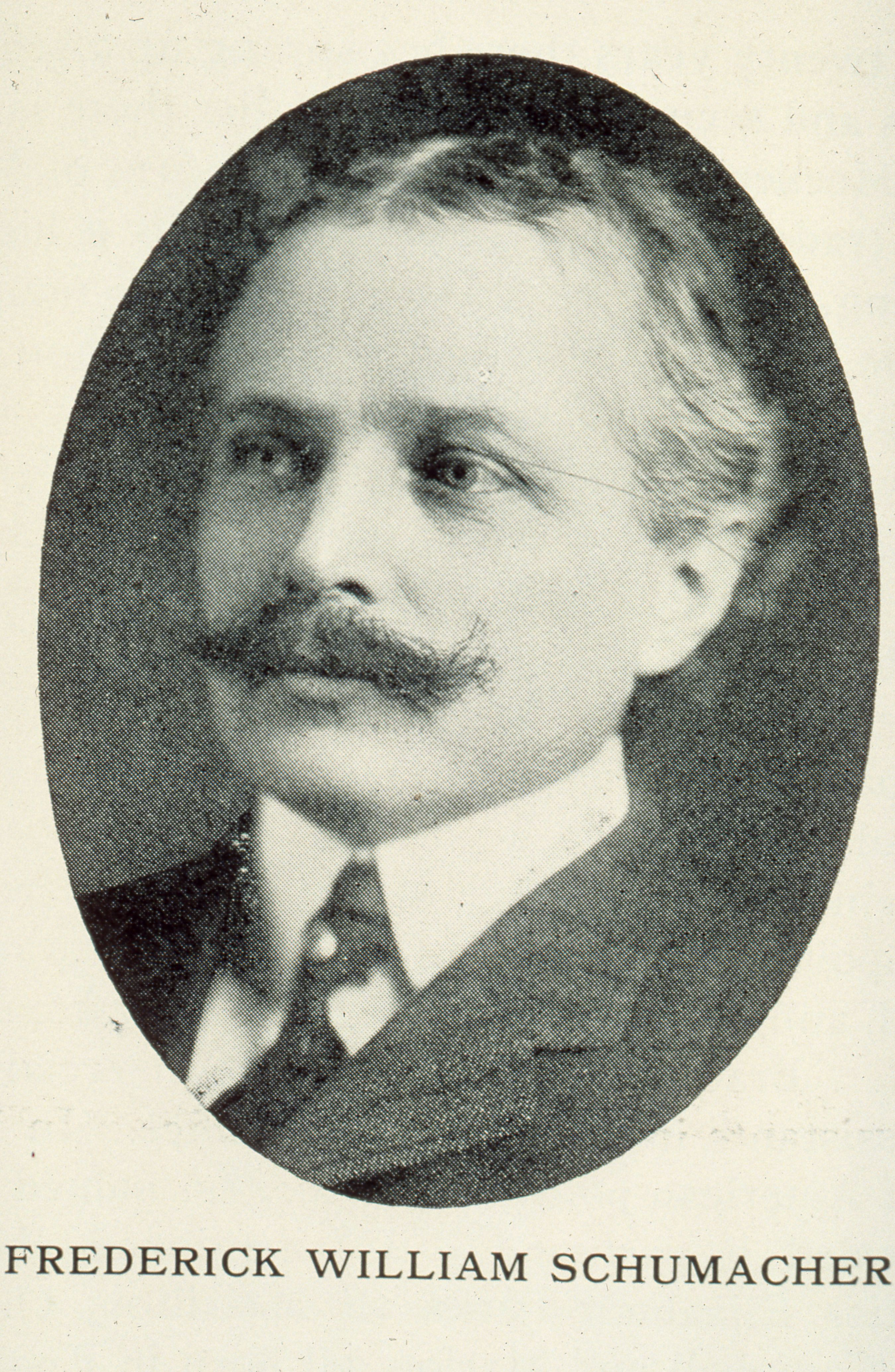
Portrait of Frederick W. Schumacher, 1906

Frederick William Schumacher (1863–1957) was an American philanthropist and businessman. He was noted for helping establish the Columbus Museum of Art, settling a town named Schumacher in Ontario, Canada, and for leading the successes as vice president of the Peruna Drug Manufacturing Company. Schumacher lived in what became known as the Frederick W. Schumacher mansion until his death in 1957.

== Biography ==
Schumacher was born on the island of Fehmarn; at the time it was considered part of Denmark's Duchy of Schleswig, though it became part of Germany after the Second Schleswig War in 1864. When he was ten years old, Schumacher and his family immigrated to Waco, Texas. There he attended local public schools, but would travel to Europe between his academic years to visit family and study classical art and history. He graduated from the St. Louis College of Pharmacy and Chemistry and returned to Waco to open a pharmacy and wholesale drug business.

Schumacher eventually made a fortune as the head of advertising for the Peruna Drug Manufacturing Company. Schumacher and founder Samuel B. Hartman (his father-in-law) were the most impactful in the company; Schumacher's advertising efforts made the drug remarkably popular and a household name. Schumacher also became a prominent Columbus patron of the arts, and served as president of the Columbus Gallery of Fine Arts from 1904 to 1923. Schumcher married Hartman's daughter, Maribel Hartman, in 1895, at the Hartman home. In 1897, the couple moved from Waco to Columbus, taking up temporary residence in the Hartman home, and later, at 71 Winner Avenue. In 1901 the couple moved to 750 East Broad Street, what would become known as the Schumacher mansion. The couple remodeled the house and purchased adjacent lots, so that the house's grounds would be bounded by four streets.

In March 1917, Maribel and Frederick Schumacher separated; Maribel moved with their three children to the Hartman home at that time. In September of that year, Maribel filed for divorce, alleging that he failed to financially support her and their children for clothing travel expenses, and furnishings for their home. She also alleged Schumacher would humiliate her with accusations related to infidelity and by following her while traveling. A Columbus Dispatch biography surmised that the relationship failed due to differences in interests and personality, exacerbated by the twelve-year difference in their ages. Maribel later remarried, while Schumacher lived out the rest of his life relatively alone. By 1950, Schumacher had two servants employed and regularly invited opera stars, bishops, and governors as guests, though he otherwise lived alone. William "Frank" Hartigan served as his chauffeur for over 50 years.

After about a year of illness, Schumacher died at his house on June 4, 1957. In July 1957, Columbus City Council suggested preserving the house and making it into a memorial to Schumacher; the council approved a resolution asking Schumacher's heirs to consider the possibility. The council wrote that unless the house was to be preserved, it would eventually give way to increasing commercialization in the area and would be destroyed.

Schumacher, as a patron of the Columbus Gallery of Fine Arts, was instrumental in the museum's construction, and permanently loaned many of his works to help establish the organization's collection. Upon his death, the remainder of his collection was willed to the museum. The 138-piece Schumacher Collection was researched and exhibited in full in 1976, along with a complete catalog of the works. By the time of his death, some of his collection was already housed in a room inside the museum that bore his name. The most valuable painting in the collection was Portrait of a Young Girl by Thomas Gainsborough. It was not part of Schumacher's estate, as it was donated to the museum before his death.
