= Neil House =

Former hotel in Columbus, Ohio, U.S.

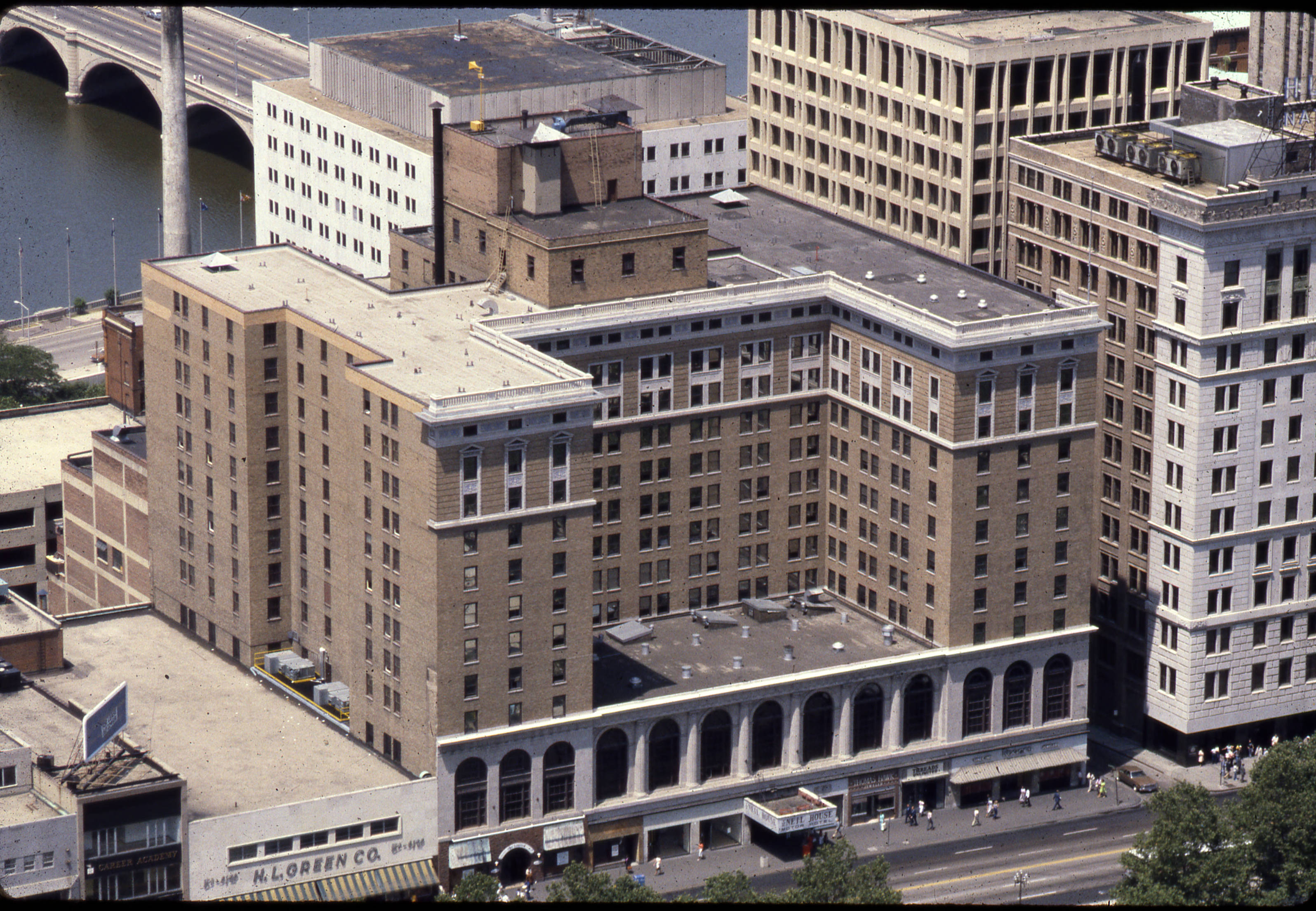
- The third Neil House building c. 1970s
- Present-day site of the hotel

General information
- Location: 41 South High St., Columbus, Ohio
- Coordinates: 39.961119°N 83.000958°W
- Opened: 1842
- Closed: 1980
- Demolished: 1981

Technical details
- Floor count: 13 (3rd building)

The Neil House was a historic hotel on High Street in Downtown Columbus, Ohio. The hotel operated on Capitol Square from 1842 to 1980.

== Attributes ==
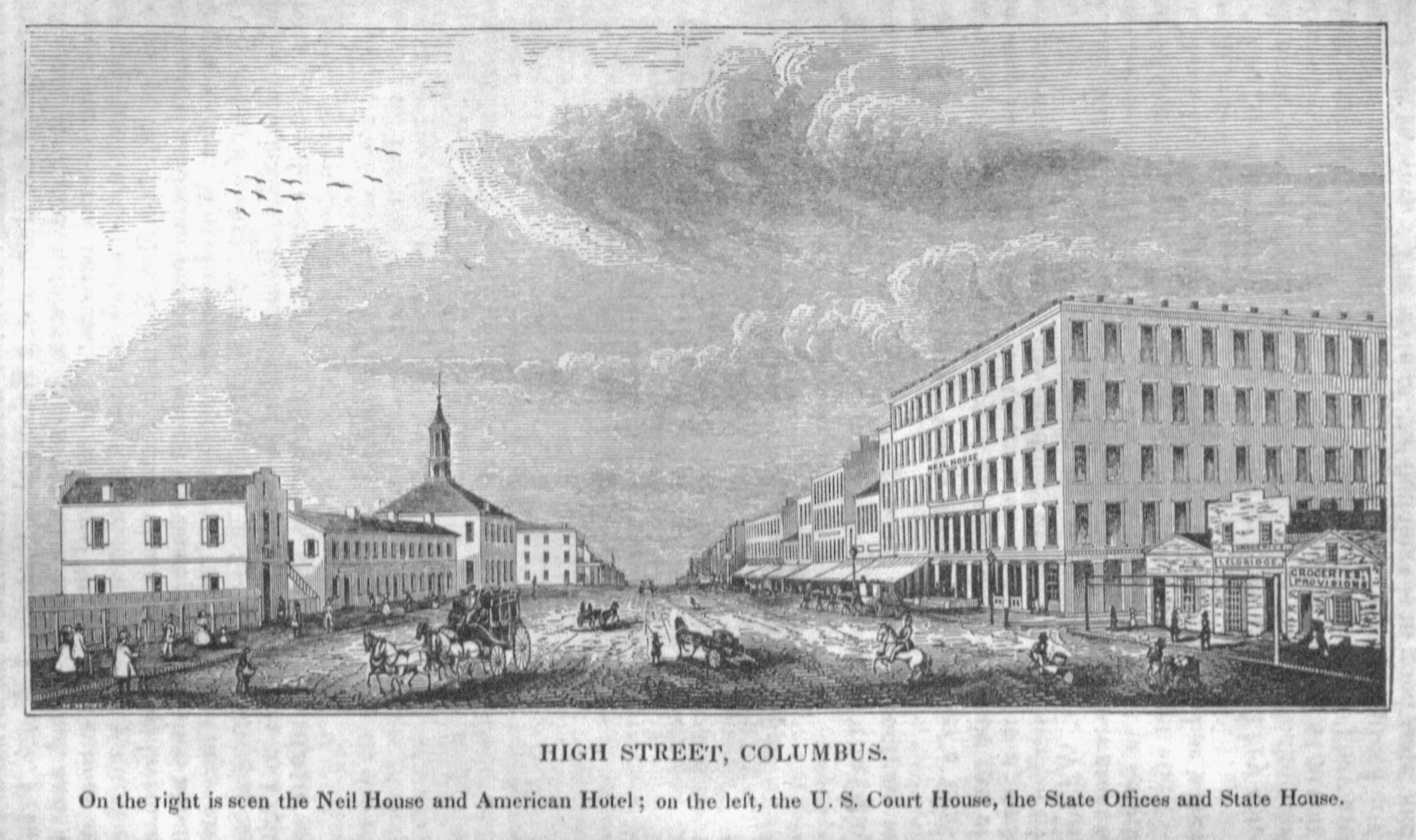
The first hotel building, 1846

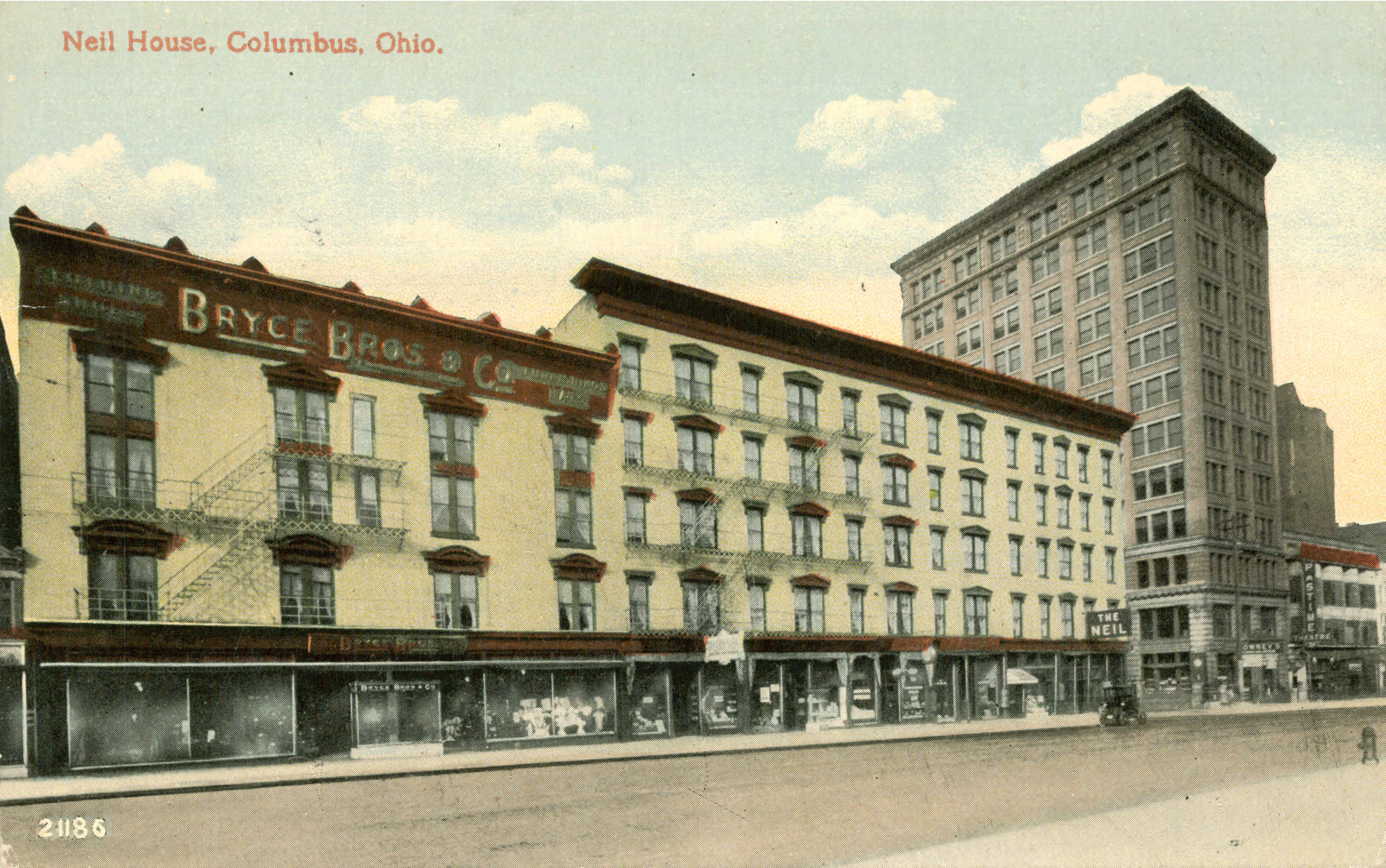
The second hotel building, c. 1915

The hotel buildings were located on South High Street across from the Ohio Statehouse.

=== First building ===
The first hotel building had five stories and 334 rooms. It was made of brick and black walnut, all taken from William Neil's farm in Wyandot County, Ohio.

=== Second building ===
The second Neil House building had 168 rooms.

=== Third building ===
The third hotel building was the largest, with 657 rooms at 13 stories. It was built in the Beaux Arts architectural style. It featured a 13-panel mural by Rainey Bennett. This building was painted by folk artist William L. Hawkins, in Neil House with Chimney and Neil House with Chimney #2.

== History ==
The third hotel from street level, 1965

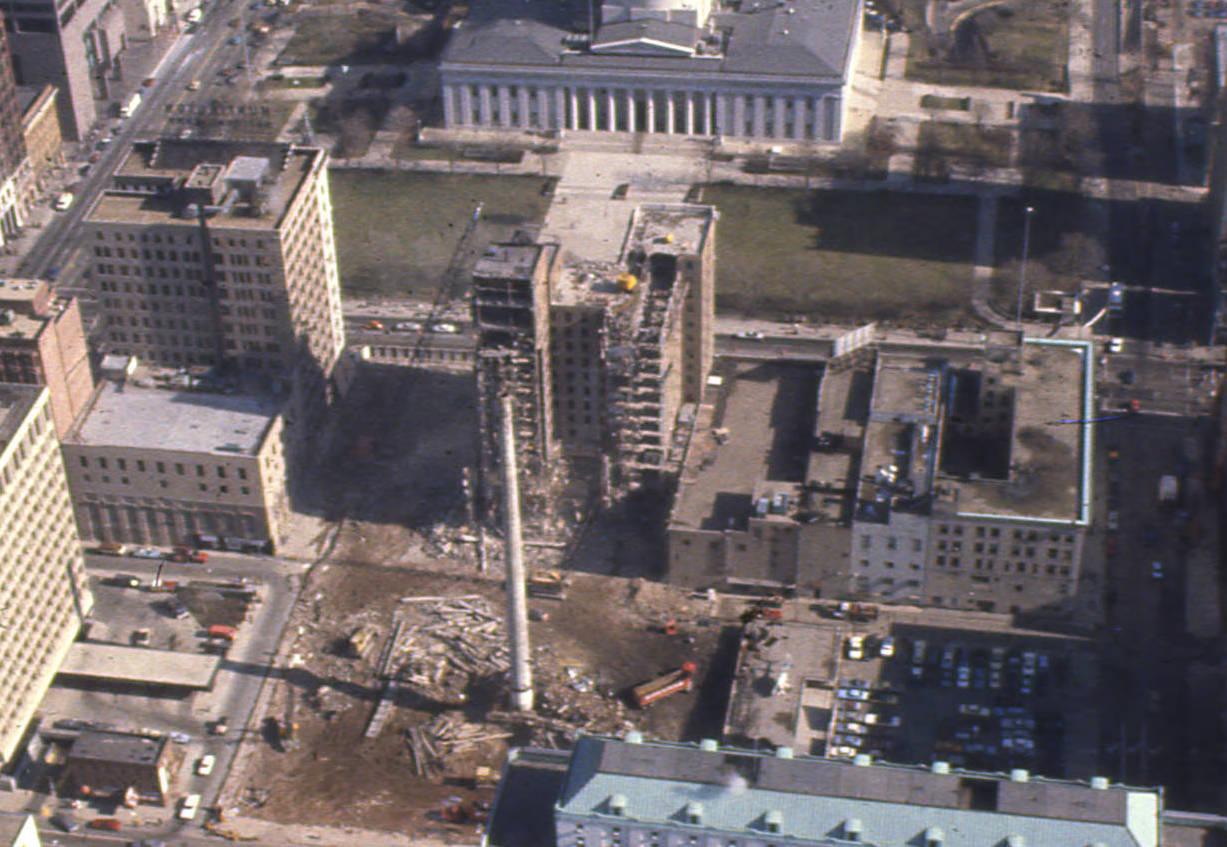
The third hotel's demolition in 1981

There were three hotel buildings successively built on the site. William Neil built the hotels after arriving in the city in 1818, and having operated a tavern in the location from 1822 to 1839. Neil and his wife Hannah also became known for his stagecoach company, her mission for orphaned children, and their farm that became the Ohio State University campus around 1870.

The first hotel built on that site was completed in 1842 at a cost of about $100,000. It was destroyed in a fire, along with the neighboring Odeon Theater, on November 6, 1860. The loss was only partly insured ($10,000, with a structural loss of $150,000), but Neil proceeded to build a smaller hotel on the site by 1862. This second hotel became future president William McKinley's home as the Governor of Ohio from 1892 to 1896 (the McKinley Memorial stands where McKinley would stop and wave to his wife every morning). This second building was demolished in 1923 to make room for the larger third building. This third hotel opened in August 1925, in a celebration that included a dinner and dance for 770 investors and leading residents. It was a large building, twice as large as Columbus's second-largest hotel. The third hotel was designed by Cincinnati architect Gustave W. Drach. It closed in 1980 to make way for the Huntington Center.

The hotel was one of few sites listed in The Green Book in Columbus.
