= Samuel Brubaker Hartman =

American physician and quack (1830–1918)

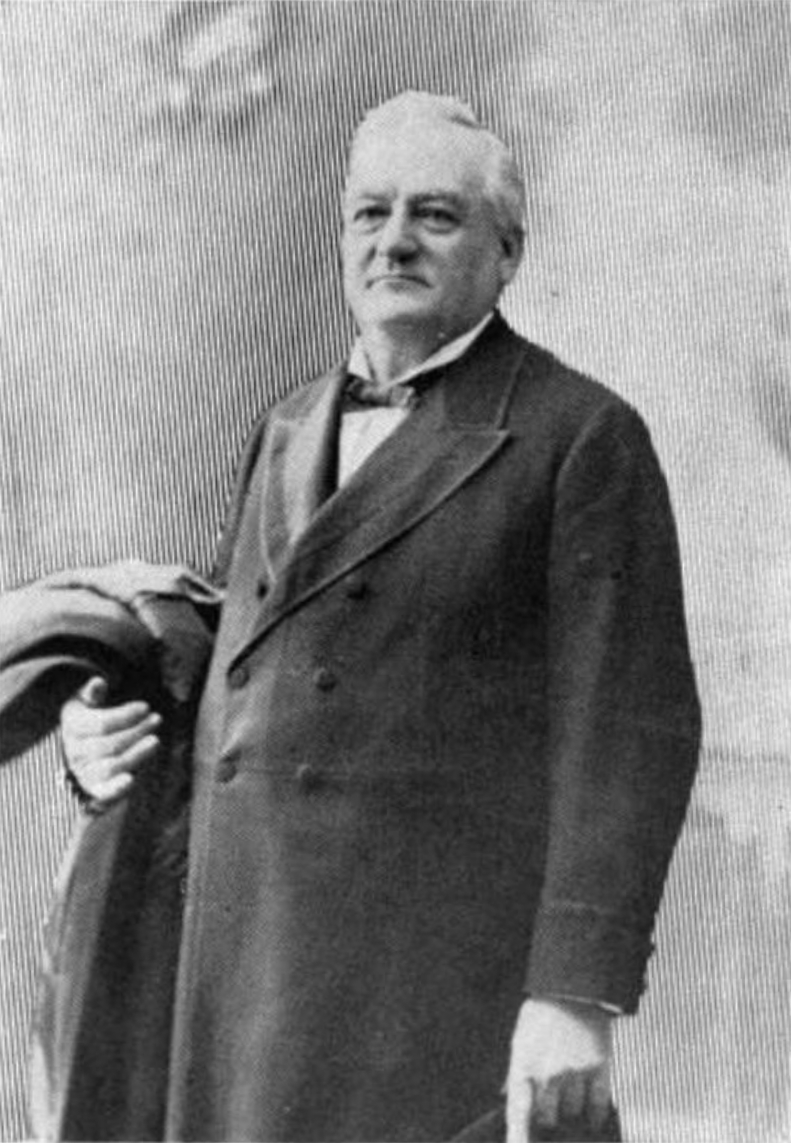
- Born: April 1, 1830; Harrisburg, Dauphin County, Pennsylvania, US
- Died: January 30, 1918 (aged 87); Columbus, Franklin, Ohio, US
- Education: Farmer's College (1852), Western Reserve Medical College, Jefferson Medical College alumni (1856–1857)
- Occupations: Physician and surgeon
- Years active: 1854–1890
- Known for: Creating Pe-ru-na
- Relatives: Hans Herr (3rd great-grandfather)
- Medical career
- Sub-specialties: orthopedics, optometry and audiology

Samuel Brubaker Hartman (April 1, 1830 – January 30, 1918) was an American physician, surgeon, and multi-millionaire quack who redefined catarrh as the source of all disease and patented the renowned miracle cure Peruna.

Hartman was one of the most successful patent medicine manufacturers of the 19th century and produced numerous publications through his own company, most of which promoted his medicine Pe-ru-na.

== Family and childhood ==
=== Early life ===
Samuel Brubaker Hartman was born on a farm 2.5 miles (4.0 km) from Harrisburg, Dauphin County, Pennsylvania, on April 1, 1830. He was the youngest son of Christian Herr Hartman, an influential and self-educated farmer in the area and great-great-grandson of German-speaking Swiss Mennonite Bishop Hans Herr. Samuel's mother is given as Nancy Brubaker in most published books, but she went by the name Anna in official documents, including the 1850 and 1860 census and death certificates of Samuel and his brother Jacob.

His parents were both born and raised in Lancaster County, as were the majority of their children. It was not until 1827 that the family moved to the farm in Dauphin County where Samuel was born three years later. Unfortunately for the family, his father acquired this property on a half-paid mortgage but died six months after Samuel was born—well before he could pay it off. So it was that Samuel's mother was forced to sell the farm to satisfy the mortgage and was left penniless with eight children to care for.

The family moved back to Lancaster County, dwelling in a log cabin on the outskirts of Millersville. His mother, though destitute, earnestly devoted herself to rearing her children without assistance. This meant, however, that said children had to become as self-supporting as possible at a very early age.

At five years old, Samuel was placed on a small farm with an uncle who employed himself as a wood-chopper and made himself useful as best he could. Two years later, an aunt died, leaving him $150 to be inherited when he came of age and he went to live with his guardian, John Charles, a farmer near Millersville. It was in the seven years he lived there that he learned how to farm and became quite good at it for a young boy. At age fourteen, he moved to Medway, Ohio, and lived with his brother, Jacob, to whom he apprenticed himself as a carpenter for six years.

At the age of 20, he moved back to Millersville to await his legally entitled inheritance of $150. He did not do so idly, however, assuming the difficult responsibility of teaching unruly pupils that winter. After collecting aforementioned inheritance on his 21st birthday in 1851, he went back to Ohio to live with his brother and continue their carpentry business.

Wishing to make more money, he became a book canvasser, selling a German-English Testament published by the American Bible Society of New York. Although inexperienced in the business, he earned $82 from the first week's sales and pursued this line of work for four months.

=== Higher education and early career ===
The next winter, he went to a private school and in the spring of 1852 entered Farmers' College near Cincinnati where he first began to study medicine. He later returned to his brother's home in Medway to continue his studies under Dr. Shackelford in the Western Reserve Medical College in Cleveland. His financial means now exhausted, he sold trees for three months in Kentucky. With the money earned from that venture, he established himself as a professional physician in Miami County, Ohio, near Vandalia, but soon moved north to what was then Tippecanoe, Ohio, now Tipp City, where he joined the practice of his brother, Abraham Brubaker Hartman, for two years.

It was in Tipp City that his brother recommended he use a neutralizing mixture inspired by the work of Dr. Beach. This mixture he gradually altered over the years with the approval of his peers until little of the original was left. He prescribed this to his patients as a continuation of his treatments.

At the age of 26 he went to Philadelphia and attended lectures in the Jefferson Medical College, graduating from said college in March 1857. Feeling fully equipped for a successful career, he returned to his boyhood home in Lancaster County, Pennsylvania and entered into co-partnership with Alexander Cassidy, a practitioner in Millersville. After two years, he severed his association with his partner and engaged in an independent practice in the same town. In the next twelve years, Samuel became widely known throughout the country for his proficiency as a physician and surgeon. In particular, he was known for his treatments for afflictions of the eye, ears, and orthopedics.

=== Married life ===
He married Sarah Martzel about 1859, and they had a son, Henry in January 1863 and a daughter Maribel in June 1872. By 1868 he had accumulated a fortune on which he thought he could retire, and had thought to make some investments to further that cause. Unfortunately, said investments turned into a money pit from which he managed to disentangle himself by 1870 at the cost of all but $500. He left $100 with his wife in Lancaster, Pennsylvania, and the rest he took with him as he traveled all over America. He spent 20 years incessantly rebuilding his reputation and fortune, claiming to not have missed a single appointment during this time. He did not rest even to visit his family. Instead, his family would come to the city where he was practicing on school vacations. They would stay with him from July 1 to September 1, after which Mrs. Hartman and his children would return to Lancaster to continue schooling.

== From physician to quack ==
Many of his patients complained that their local pharmacists were preparing his post-treatment mixture incorrectly. This led him to establish facilities in Osborn, Ohio, where his brother Jacob oversaw the first batch of this medicine, named Peruna, in 1877. By 1880 he employed secretaries to help him keep track of and announce his appointments, and an assistant to help him in the operating room and other various duties. In 1883, the manufacture of Peruna was moved to Columbus, Ohio. During this 20-year period he earned an average of $50,000 a year, equivalent to $1,668,103 in 2025.

In 1890, Hartman moved to Columbus with his wife and children, gave up his profession, and began to concoct and sell a series of remedies.

- La-cu-pia – a blood-thinner
- Ma-na-lin – for biliousness

=== Redefinition of catarrh ===
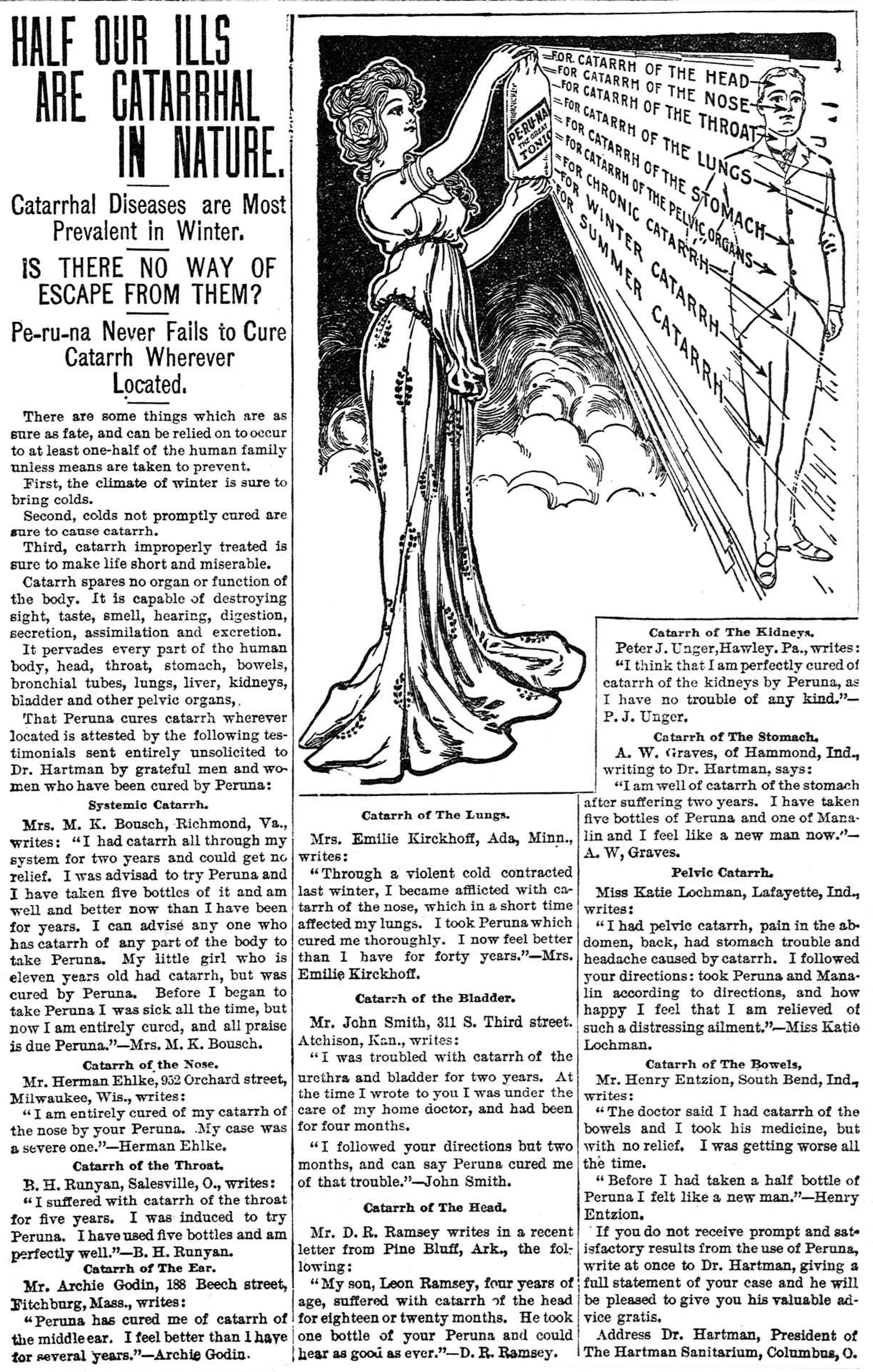
A newspaper article in the Lexington Dispatch purporting the curative effects of Pe-ru-na

In a very successful bid to increase the sales of his remedies, he asserted in his advertisements that catarrh was the root cause for every disease and affliction known to man and, most importantly, his medicine Pe-ru-na could cure it all.

- Pneumonia, tuberculosis, the common cold – catarrh of the lungs
- Canker sores – catarrh of the mouth
- Appendicitis – catarrh of the appendix or pelvis
- Chronic indigestion – catarrh of the stomach
- Mumps – catarrh of the glands
- Bright's disease – cattarh of the kidneys
- Yellow fever

=== Death ===
Hartman died on January 30, 1918, in the Hartman Hotel. His body lay in state in the hotel parlors until the third day after his death, when it was moved to Green Lawn Cemetery for services. In the spring of 1918, it was removed from its vault and transported to Lancaster, Pennsylvania, to be buried.

== Gallery ==
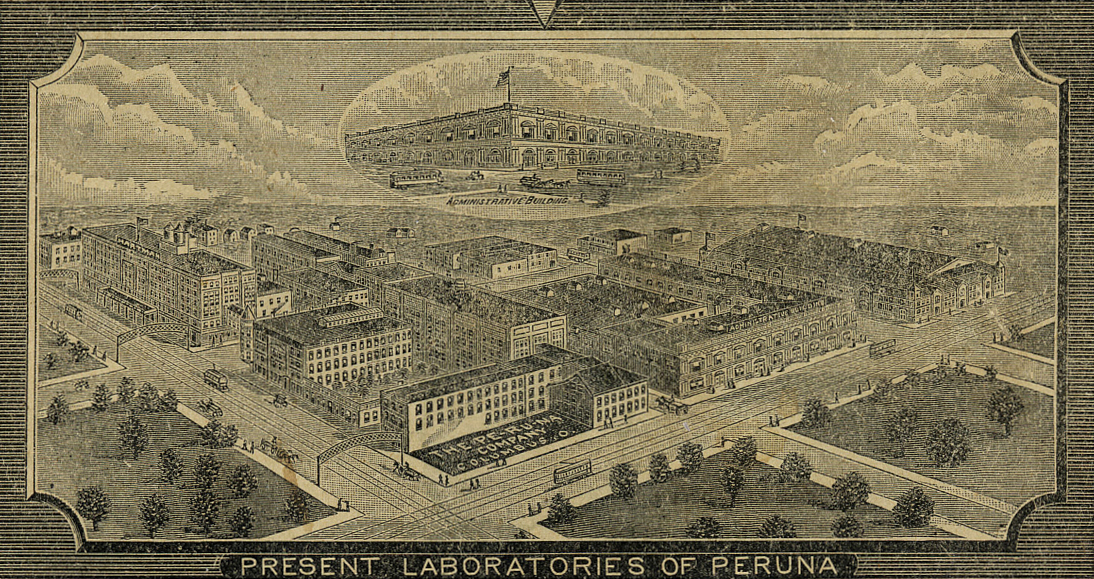
Peruna Manufacturing Company and Hartman Sanitarium

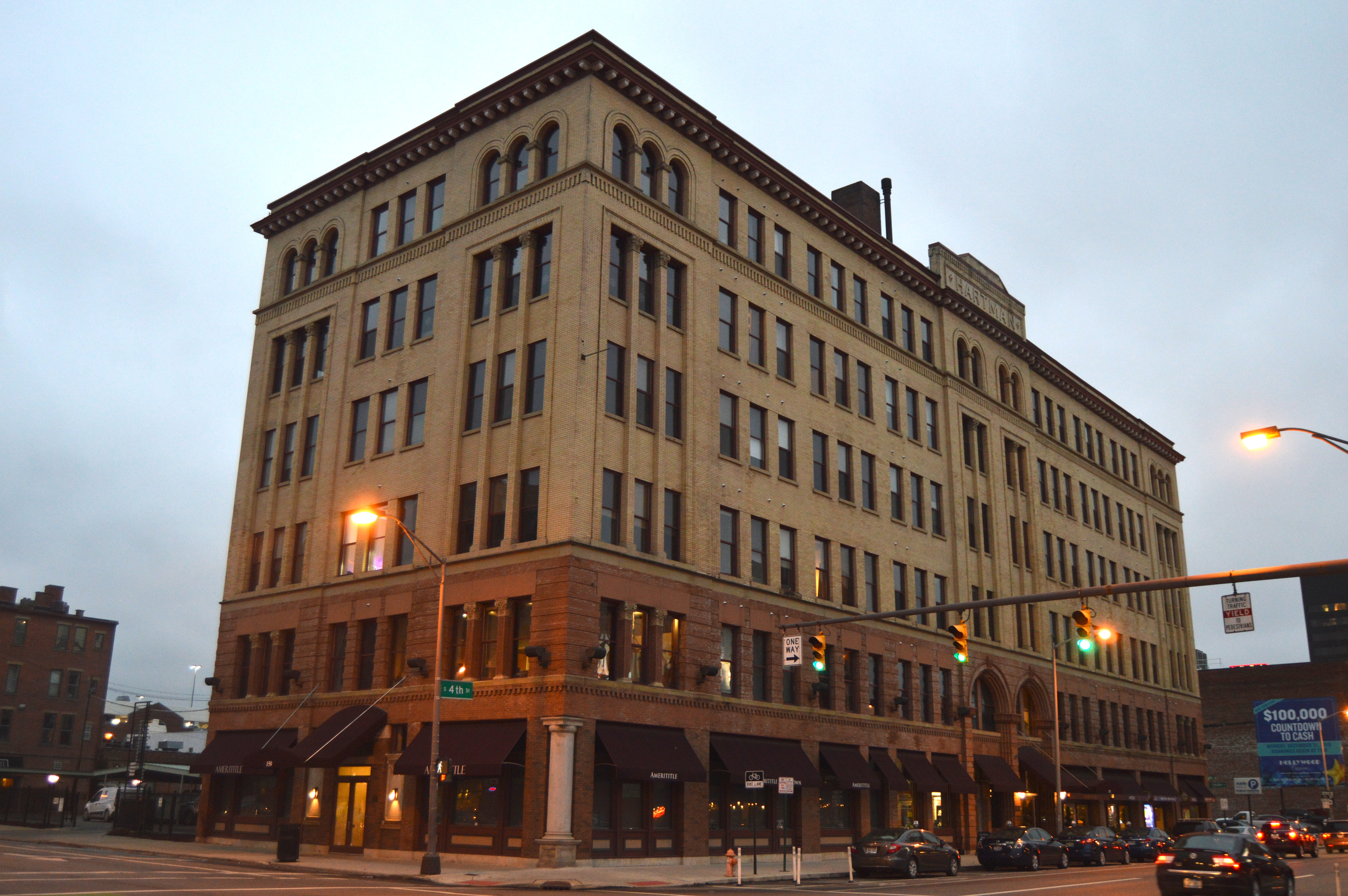
The Hartman Hotel

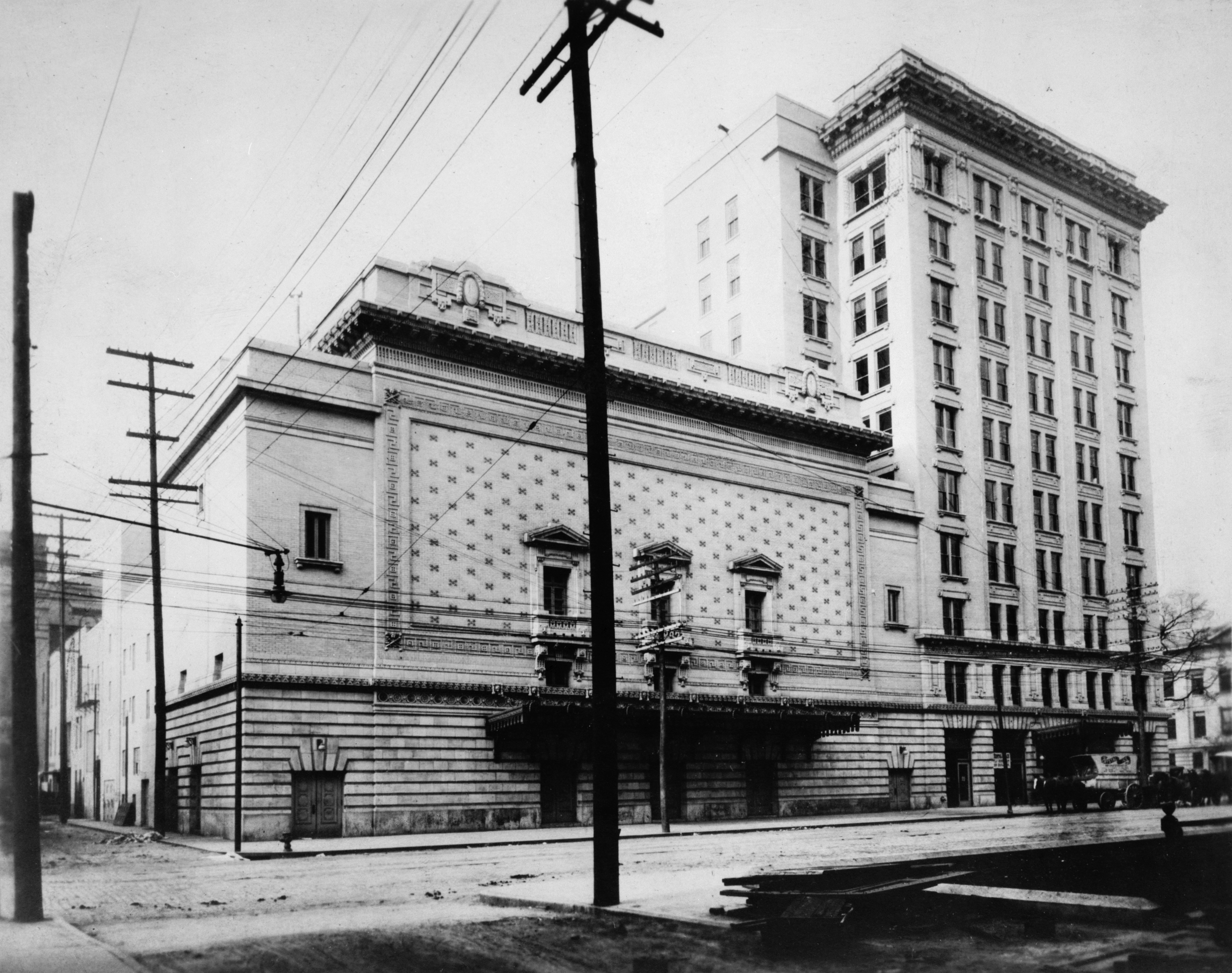
Hartman Building and Theater

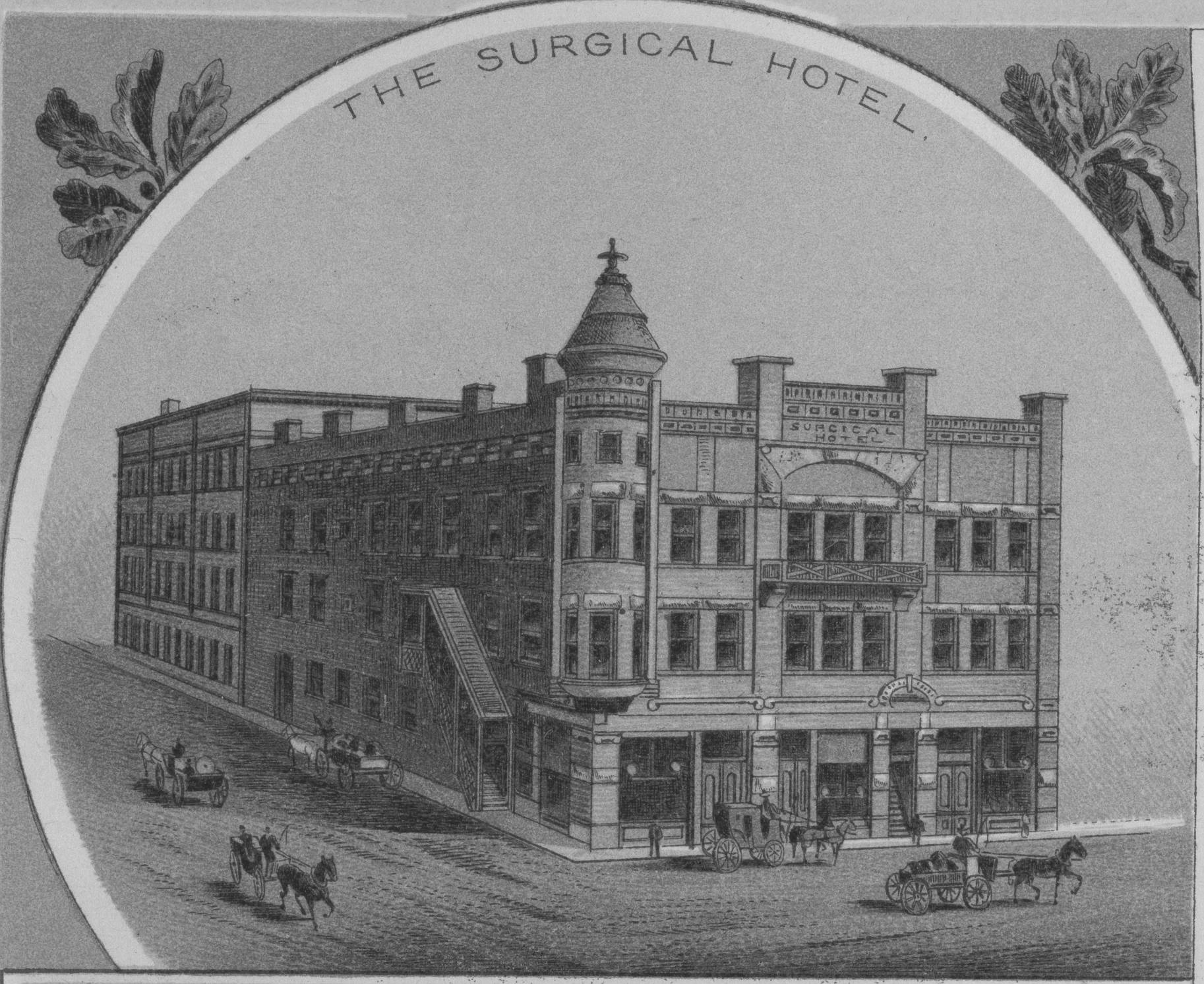
Surgical Hotel

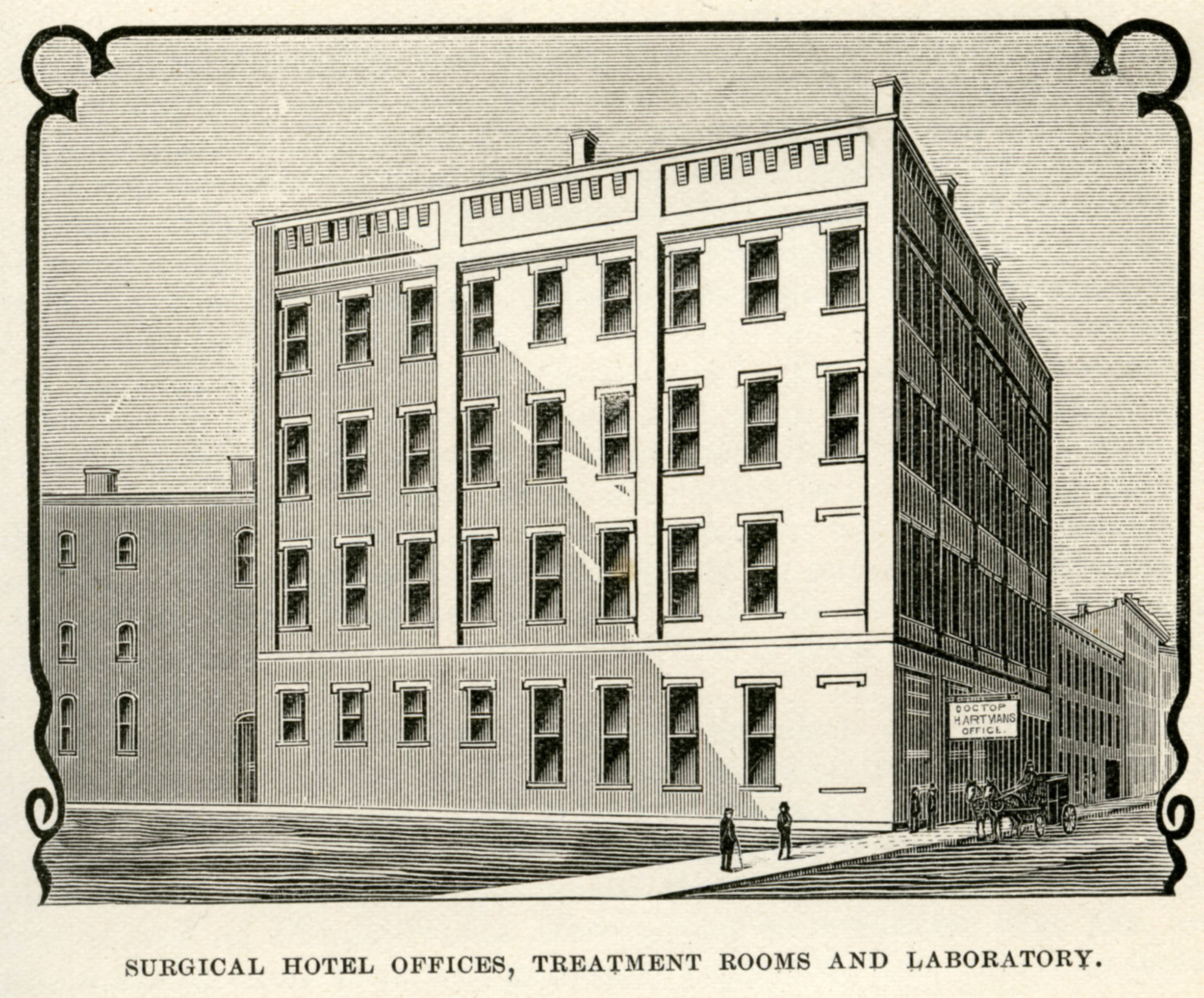
Surgical Hotel offices, treatment rooms, and laboratory

Hartman's residence

== See also ==
- Frederick W. Schumacher
