= Peruna Drug Manufacturing Company Building =

Former historic building in Columbus, Ohio, USA

- Formerly listed on the U.S. National Register of Historic Places
- Interactive map highlighting the building's location
- Location: 115 E. Rich St., Columbus, Ohio
- Coordinates: 39.957627°N 82.996798°W
- Built: c. 1902
- Architect: Herbert A. Linthwaite
- NRHP reference No.: 73002288

Significant dates
- Added to NRHP: March 14, 1973
- Removed from NRHP: 1974

The Peruna Drug Manufacturing Company Building was a historic building in Downtown Columbus, Ohio. It was built c. 1902 and was listed on the National Register of Historic Places in March 1973. The building was demolished in November 1973.

The Peruna Drug Manufacturing Company Building was a two-story brick building, and one of the most ornate commercial buildings in the city. It measured 100 x 120 ft. It had ornate north and west facades of marble over brick, while the east and south facades were simply of brick.

The building was constructed for Samuel B. Hartman's Peruna Drug Manufacturing Company, makers of the Peruna medicine. It was first built c. 1902, was nearly completed by 1904 when a worker's torch ignited packing materials, lighting the building on fire. The building was salvaged and fully occupied by 1906.

== See also ==
- National Register of Historic Places listings in Columbus, Ohio
