= Peruna (patent medicine) =

Former American patent medicine

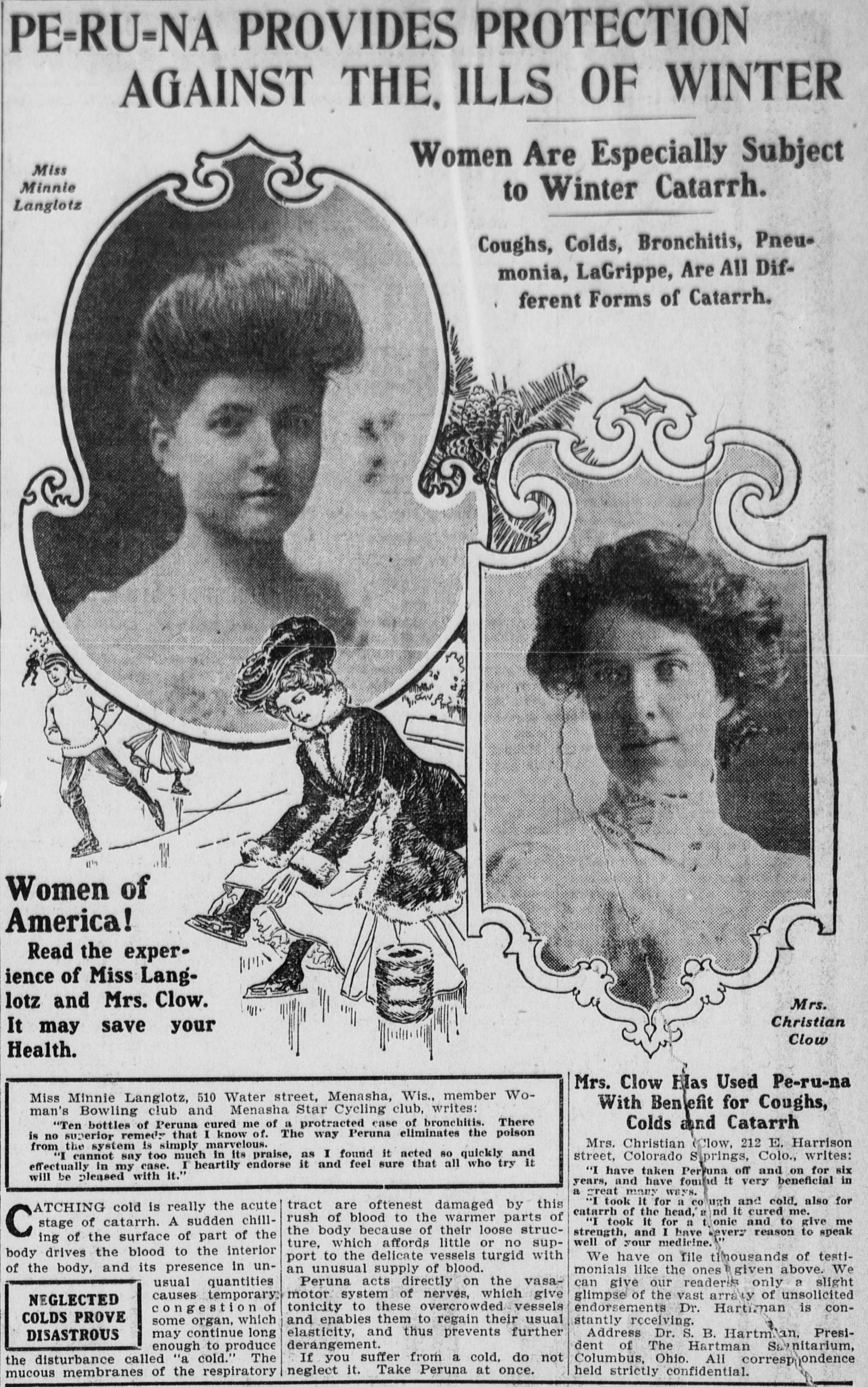
- An advertisement for Peruna
- Type: Patent medicine
- Inventor: Samuel Brubaker Hartman
- Inception: July 29, 1885
- Manufacturer: Peruna Company
- Available: No

Peruna was a well-known patent medicine sold from the late-19th to mid-20th century. It was invented by Samuel Brubaker Hartman and was endorsed by hundreds of politicians. Hartman began selling the product on July 29, 1885, and advertised it as curing catarrh. At one point, Hartman was earning around $100,000 a day from Peruna sales. The drug was reportedly so popular that babies were named after it, as was the mascot of Southern Methodist University. Peruna once released an ad with fifty United States Congressmen endorsing the product.

In a series of eleven articles the journalist Samuel Hopkins Adams wrote for Collier's in 1905, titled "The Great American Fraud", he exposed many of the false claims made about patent medicines, pointing out that in some cases, these medicines were damaging the health of the people using them. On October 20, 1906, Adams published an article claiming that Peruna and other such patent medicines were frauds, for instance alleging that the active ingredient in Peruna was 28% ethanol. The series had a huge impact and led to the passage of the Pure Food and Drug Act of 1906. In 1911, the Supreme Court ruled that the prohibition of falsifications referred only to the ingredients of the medicine.

This meant that companies were again free to make false claims about what their products would do. Adams returned to the attack, and in another series of articles in Collier's Weekly, he exposed the misleading advertising that companies were using to sell their products. Linking his knowledge of newspapers with patent medicines, he wrote the book The Clarion (1914), which was critical of newspaper advertising practices and led to a series of consumer protection articles in the New York Tribune. When Prohibition came into effect, Americans began to drink large amounts of Peruna and other similar products as a way to get intoxicated. The product had stopped being sold by the mid-1940s.

Peruna was also advertised in Alexandria, Egypt, in the early 1900s in a newspaper known as The Egyptian Gazette. The advertisements were almost always featured on page 5 of the newspaper and would typically include an anecdote about a particular person's experience with the medication.

== See also ==
- Peruna Drug Manufacturing Company Building
