= List of demolished buildings and structures in Columbus, Ohio =

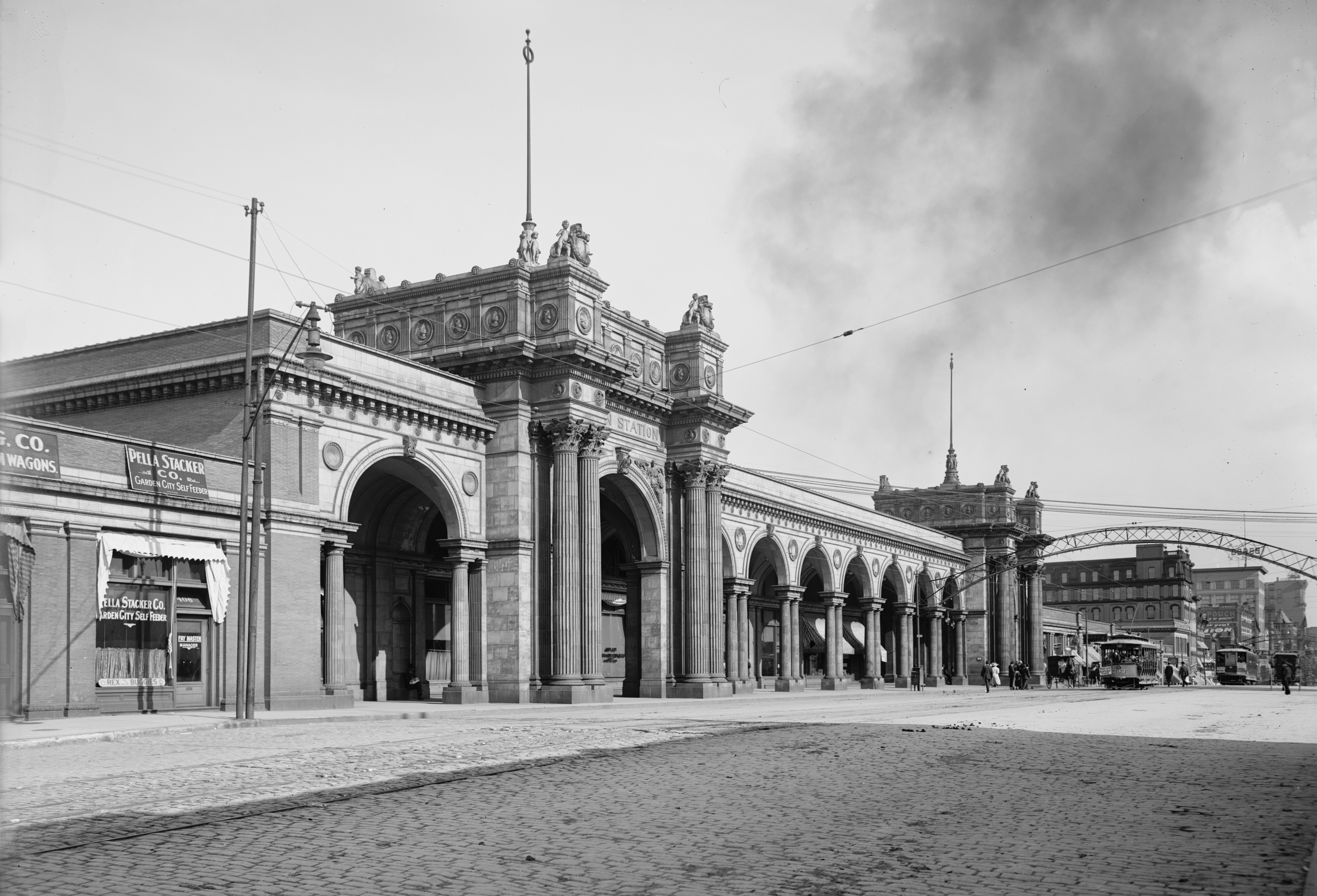
Union Station

This is a list of demolished buildings and structures in Columbus, Ohio.

By the early 20th century, Columbus had developed into a dynamic city with an extensive streetcar network and dense mixed-use neighborhoods. Beginning in the mid-20th century, as increased rates of automobile ownership combined with concerns of urban decay lead city planners to focus on suburban car infrastructure, the city demolished entire neighborhoods (particularly those with black residents) for freeways and expanded enormously geographically into urban sprawl. To meet car parking minimums and midcentury tastes in architecture, urban renewal approaches bulldozed the increasingly vacant, crumbling historic areas for modern skyscrapers, highways, and extensive parking lots for suburban commuters. Beginning around 1999, demolitions slowed as city planners began to turn to new urbanism and residential development in downtown Columbus.

Given the scale of destruction and rebuilding in Columbus, this list is not complete.

== Groups of buildings ==
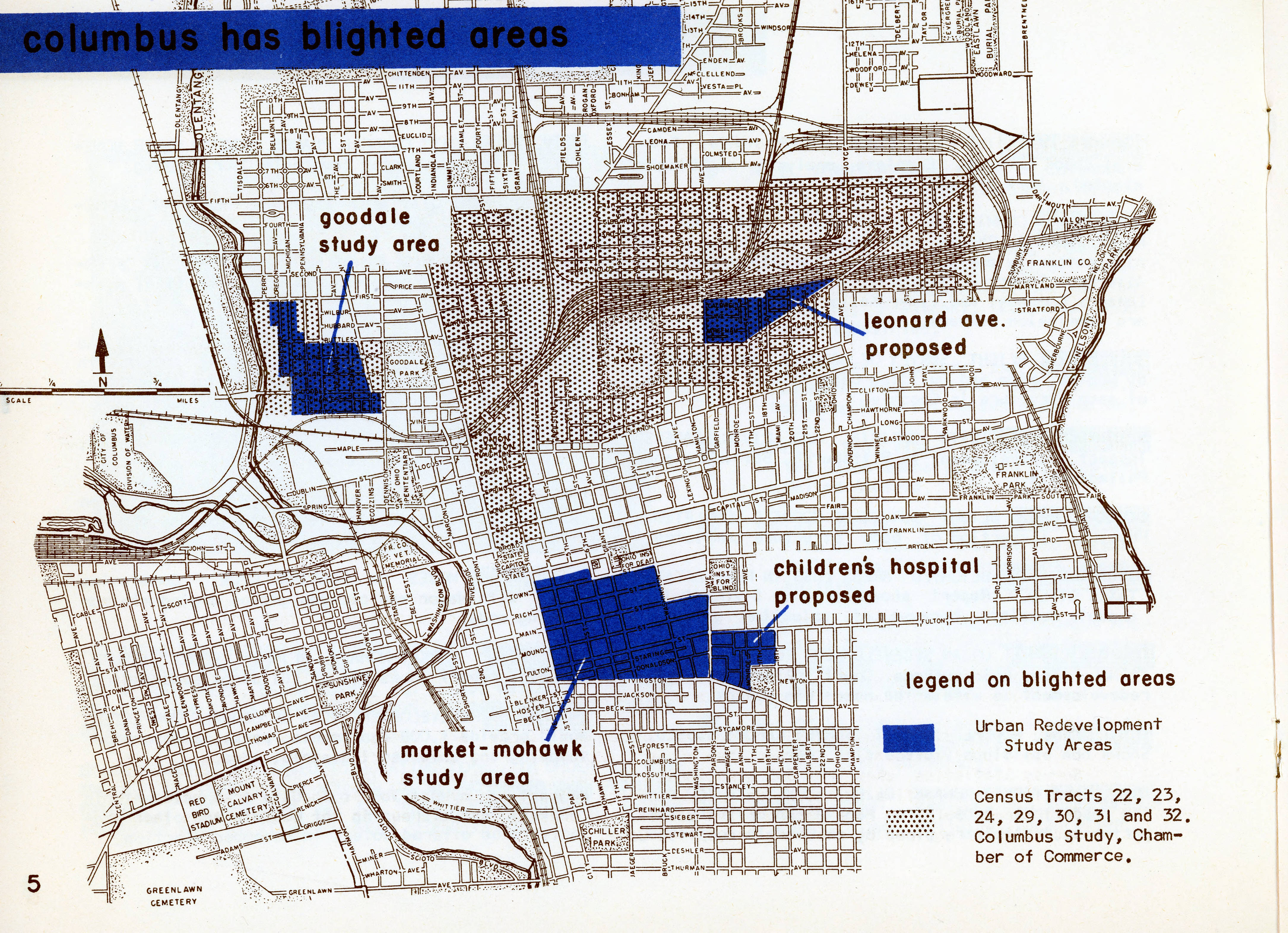
1954 urban renewal map of Columbus

- Flytown
- Hartman Stock Farm Historic District
- Market-Mohawk District
- Mount Vernon
- Poindexter Village
- Portions of the George Washington Carver Addition in Hanford Village
- Riverfront structures replaced by the Columbus Civic Center

== Bridges ==
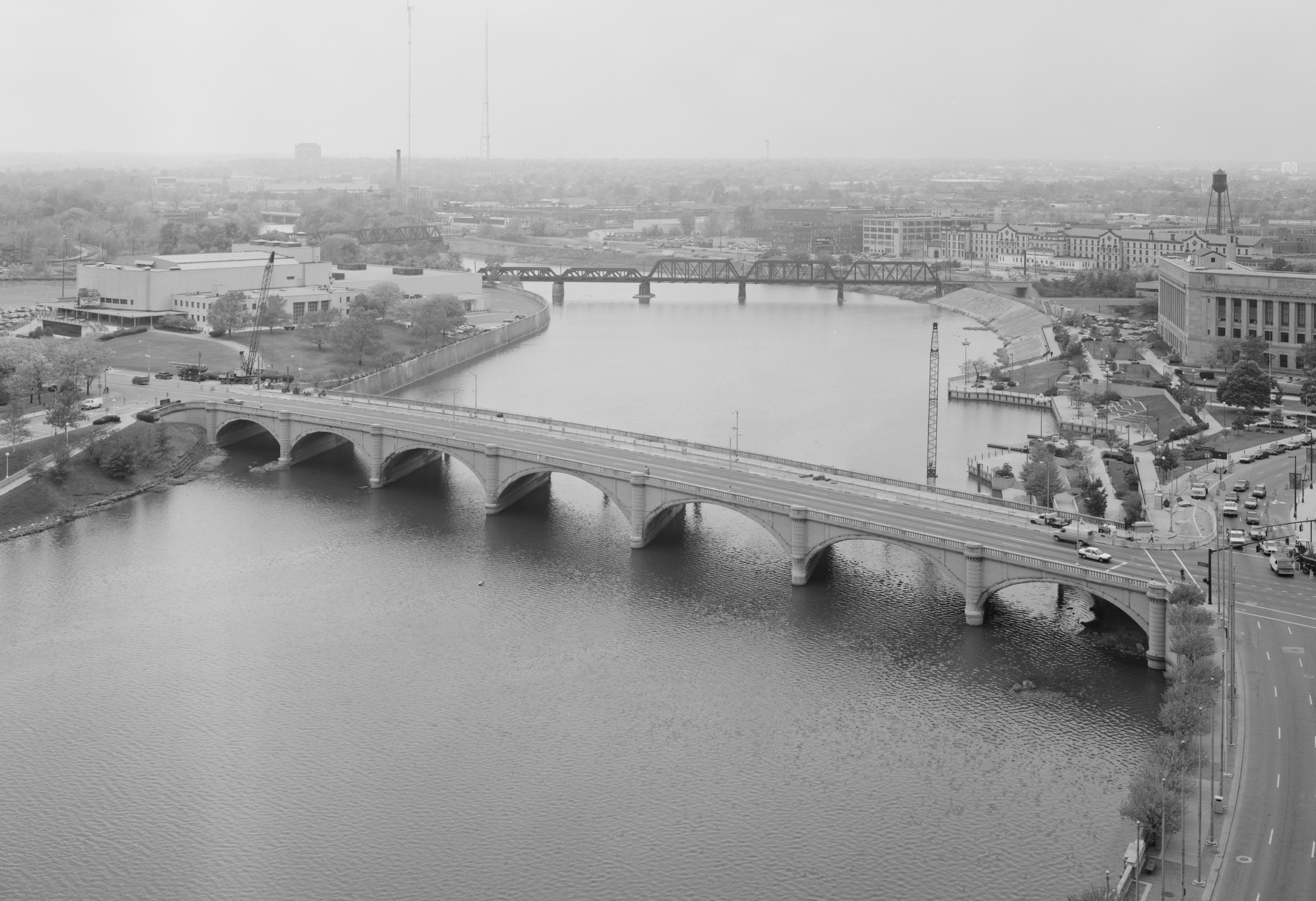
The Broad Street Bridge

- Broad Street Bridge
- 1937 Main Street Bridge
- Town Street Bridge

== Government ==
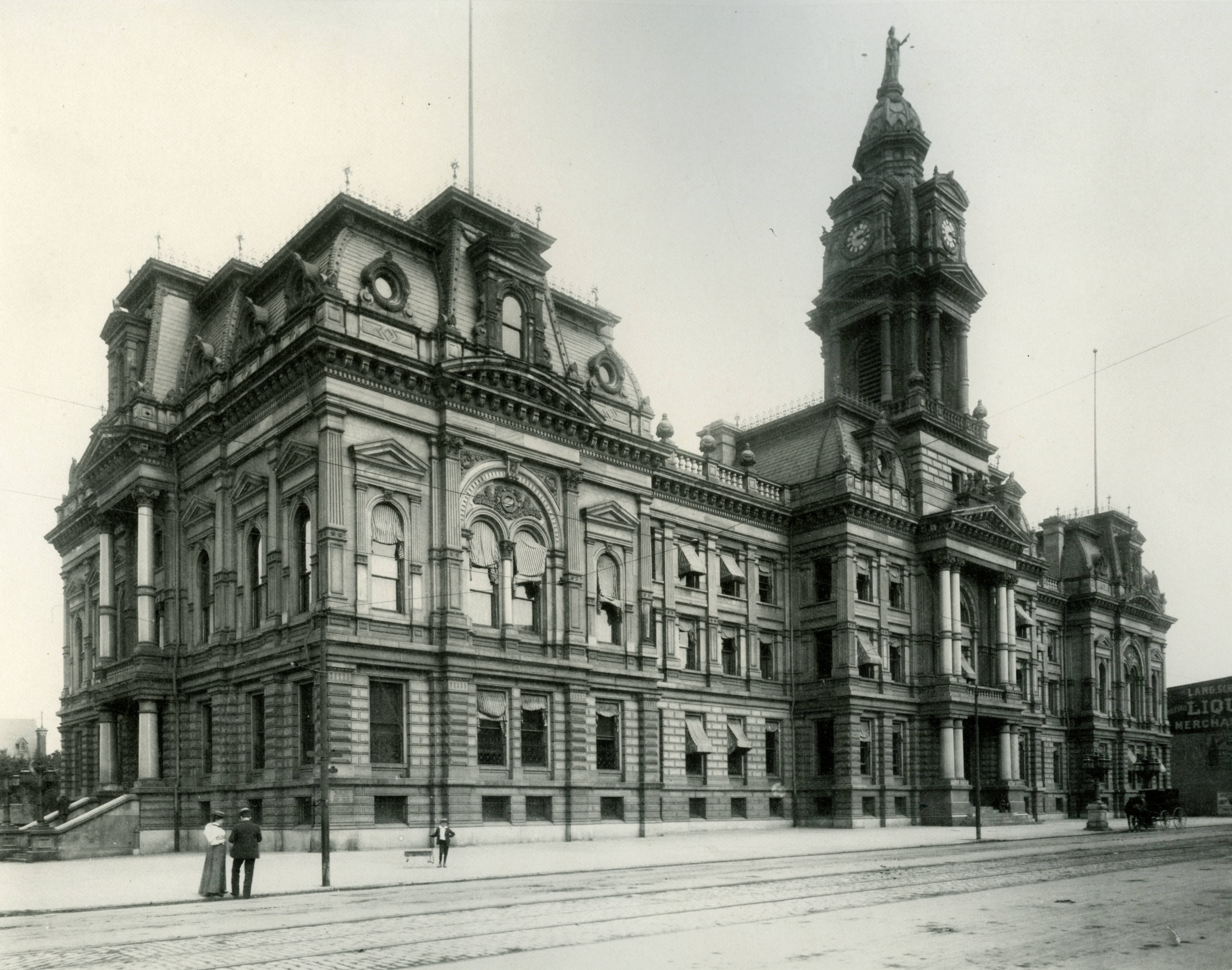
The 1887 Franklin County Courthouse

- 1840 Franklin County Courthouse
- 1887 Franklin County Courthouse
- 1872 Columbus City Hall

=== Prisons ===
- Columbus City Prison
- Franklin County Jail
- Ohio Penitentiary

== Hospitals and institutions ==
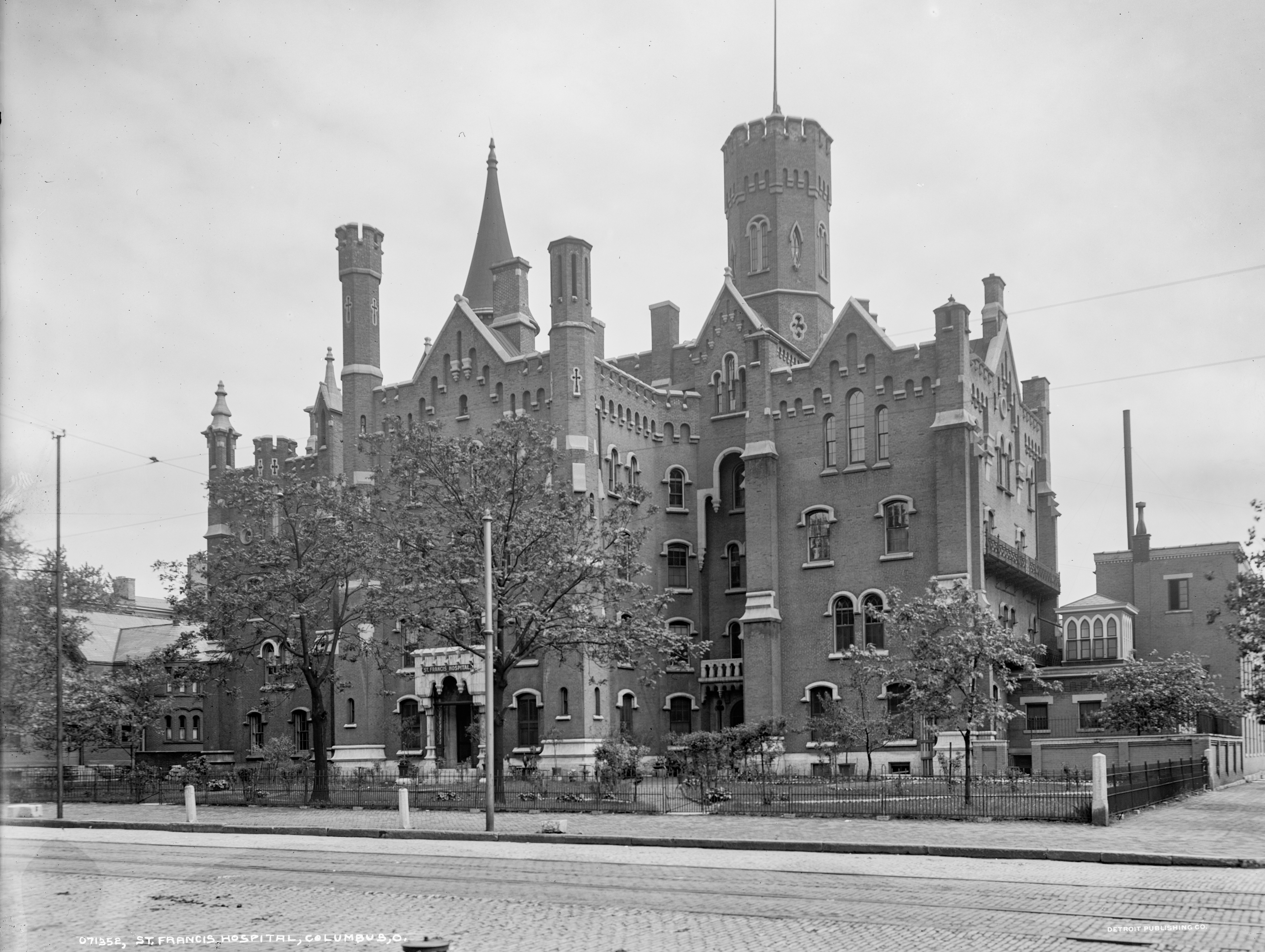
St. Francis Hospital

- Columbus State Hospital
- Hawkes Hospital
- Mount Carmel West
- Ohio Institute for Feeble Minded Youth
- Ohio Institution for the Deaf and Dumb
- St. Anthony's Hospital
- St. Francis Hospital

== Hotels ==
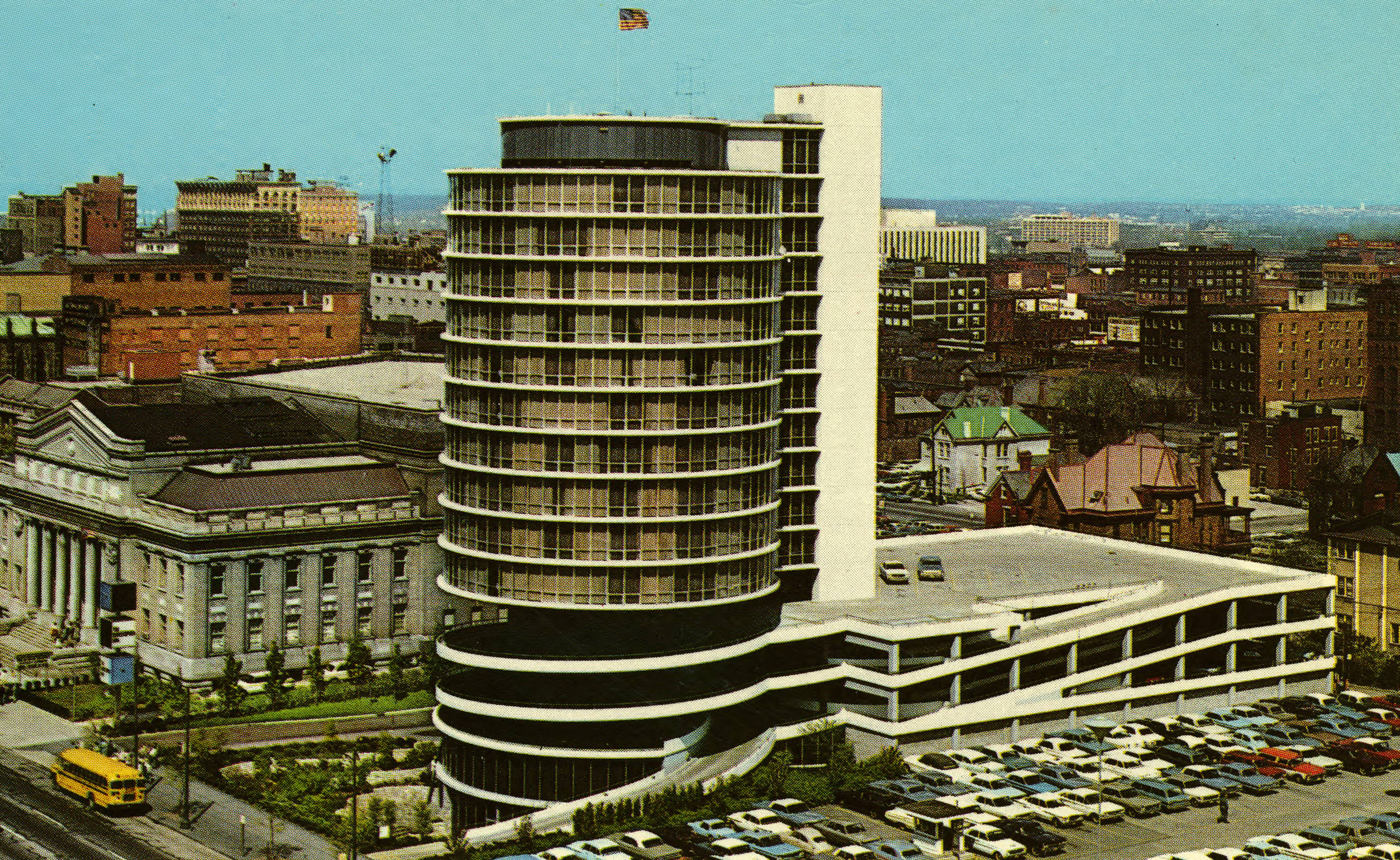
The Christopher Inn

- Chittenden Hotel
- Christopher Inn
- Deshler Hotel
- Neil House
- Park Hotel
- Plaza Hotel

== Recreation and dining ==
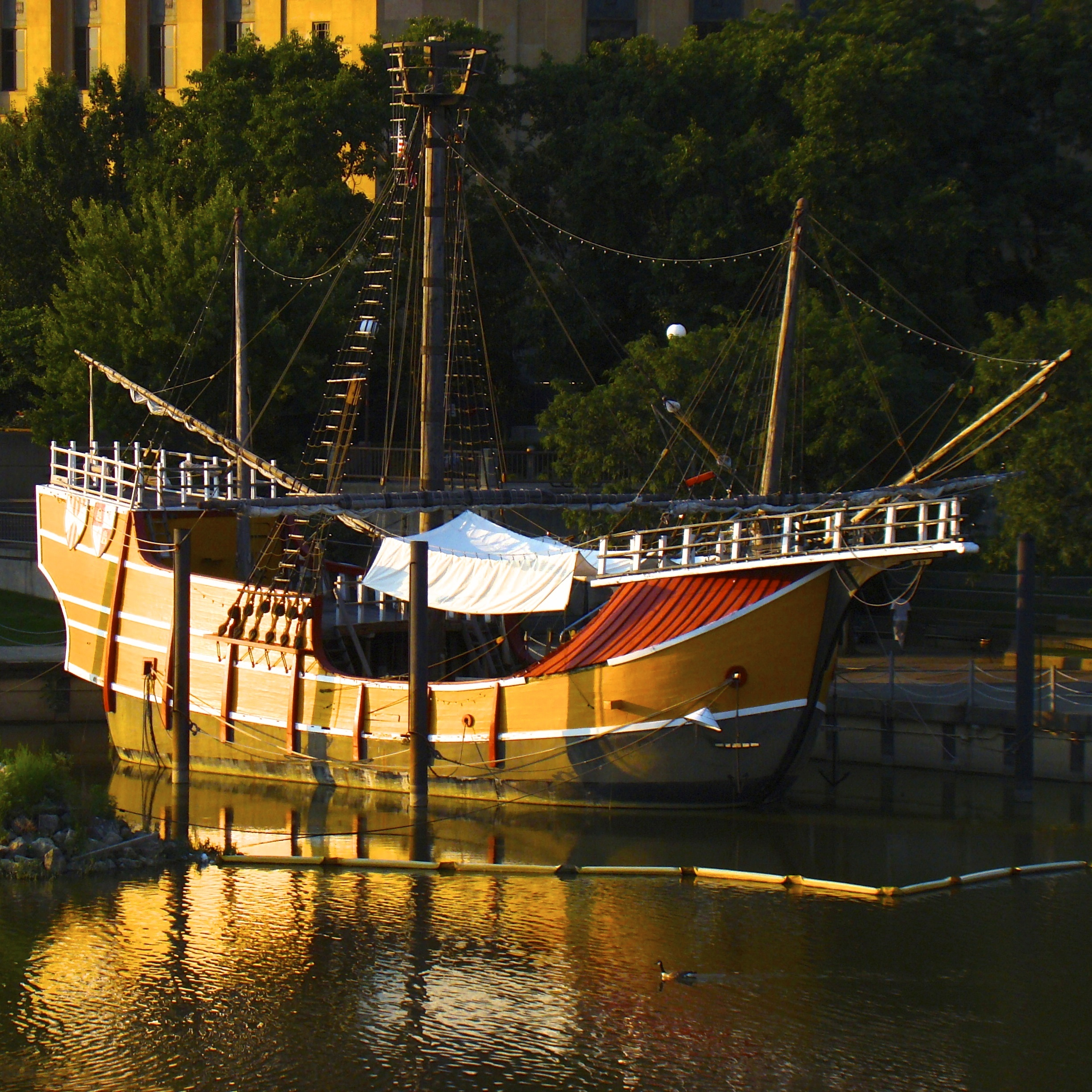
The Santa Maria Ship & Museum

- Columbus Auditorium (two structures)
- Franklin County Veterans Memorial
- Hartman Building and Theater
- Indianola Park
- Kahiki Supper Club
- Main Bar
- Olentangy Park
- RKO Grand Theatre
- Santa Maria Ship & Museum
- The Zoo

=== Sports venues ===
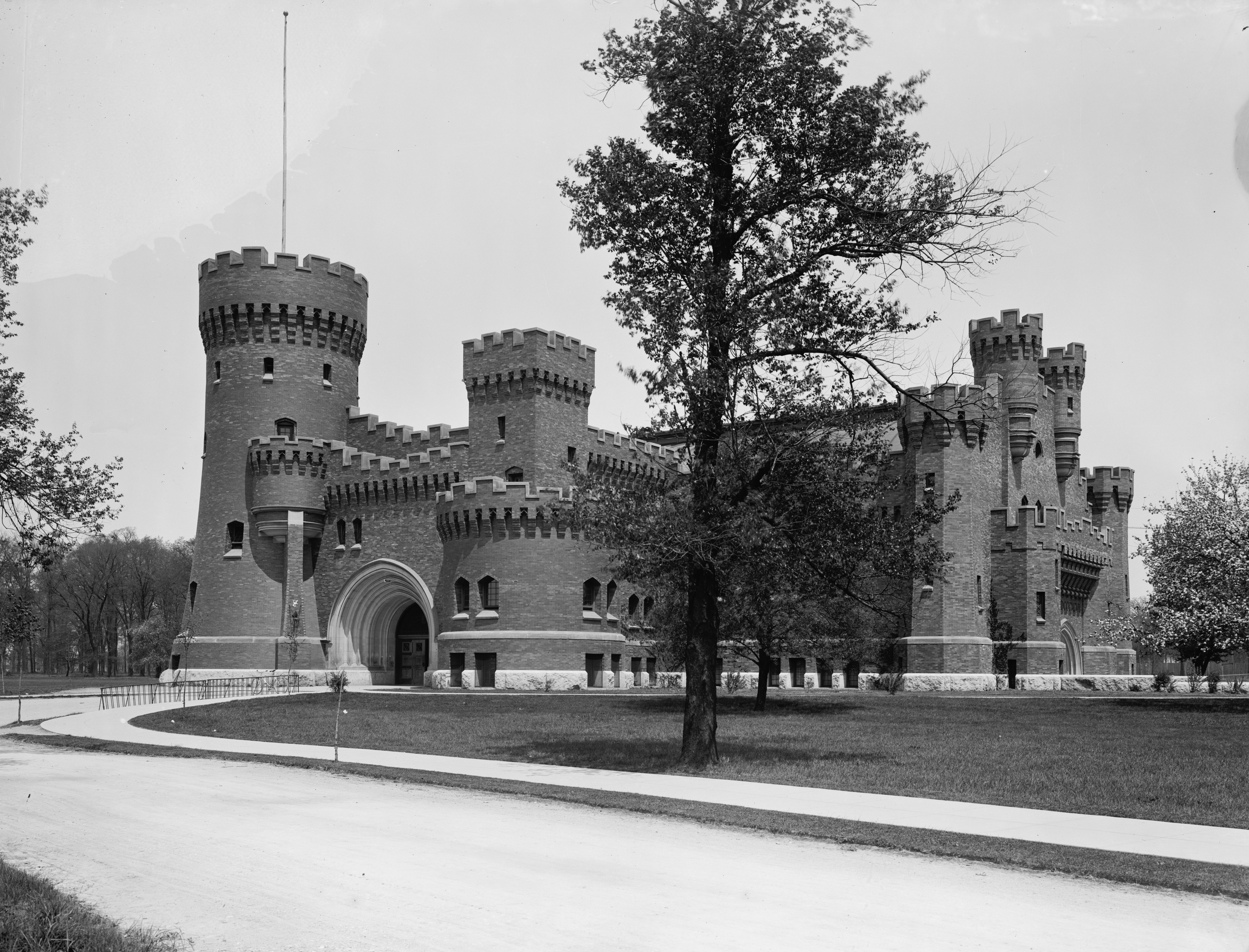
The Ohio State University Armory and Gymnasium

- Cooper Stadium (partially demolished)
- Gowdy Field
- Neil Park
- Ohio Field
- Ohio State University Armory and Gymnasium
- Recreation Park

== Religion ==
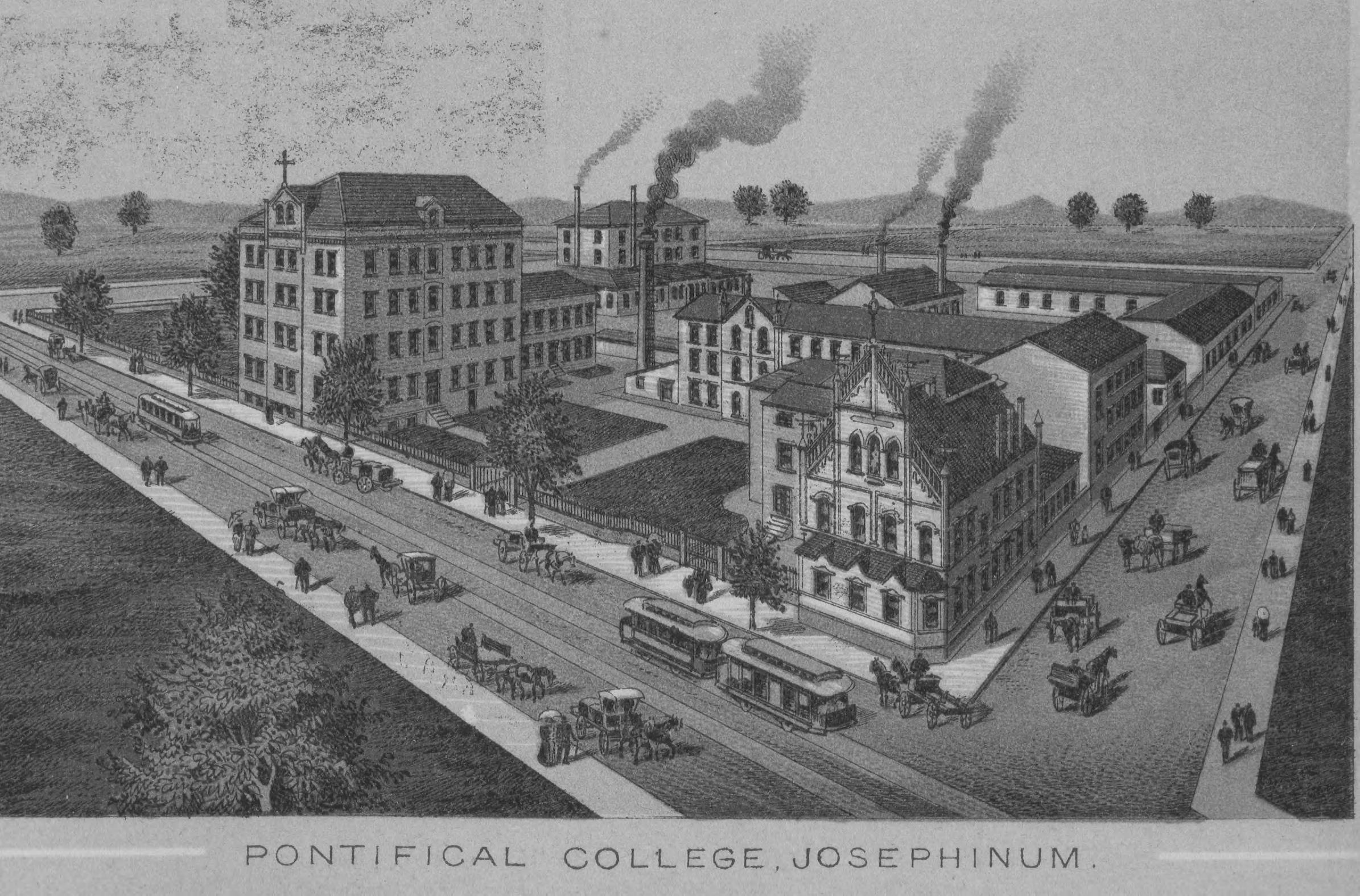
The Pontifical College Josephinum (1888-1931)

- First Congregational Church (Capitol Square)
- First Presbyterian Church, Capitol Square
- Pontifical College Josephinum (1888-1931)
- St. Vincent's Orphan Asylum and Catholic Church
- West Side Spiritualist Church

== Retail and commerce ==
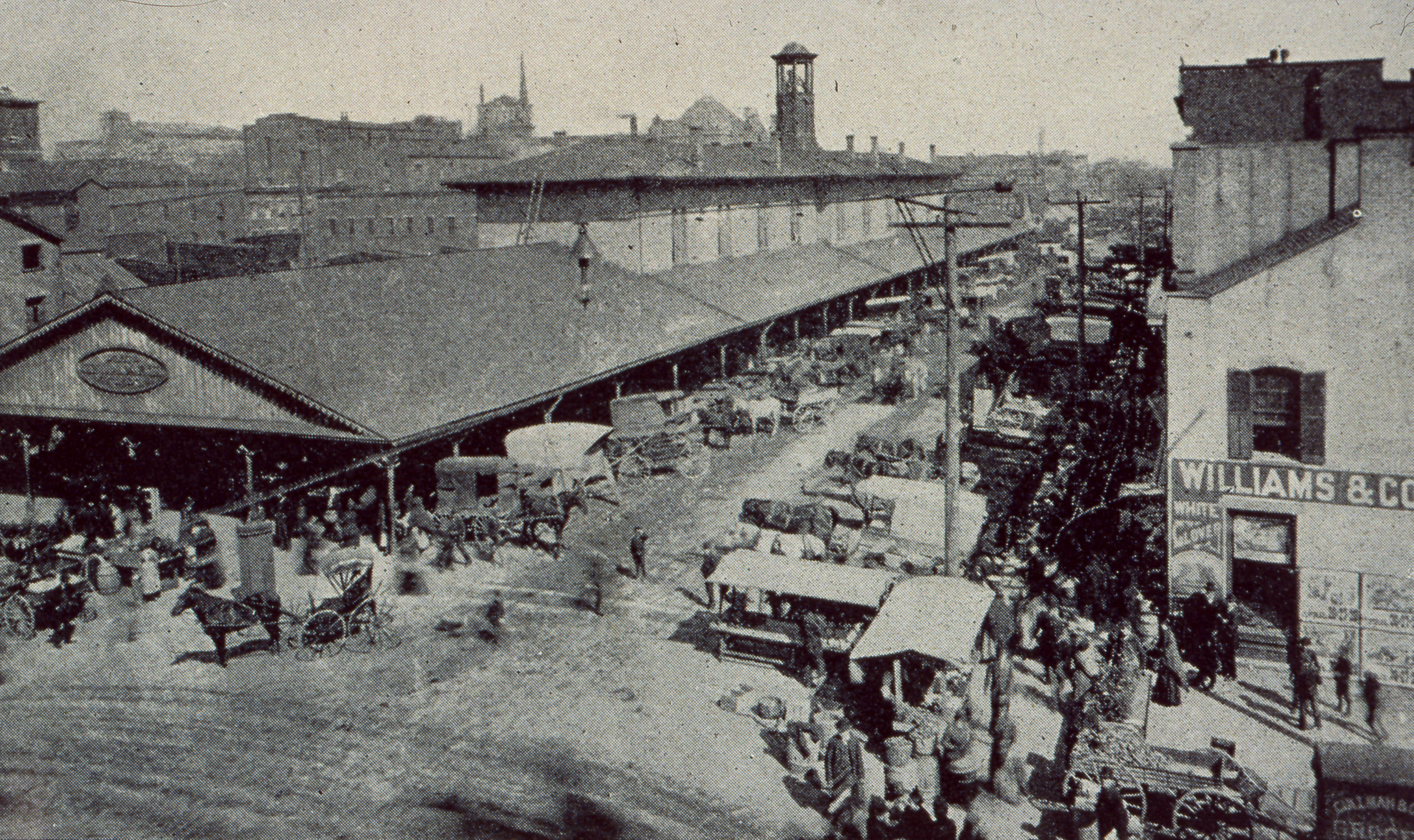
Central Market

- 5 and 7 South High Street
- American Education Press Building
- Central Market
- Columbus Board of Trade Building
- Columbus City Center
- East End Market House
- Long and Third Commercial Building
- Peruna Drug Manufacturing Company Building
- North Market (several locations)
- Northland Mall
- Ohio Building
- Trautman Building

== Residences ==
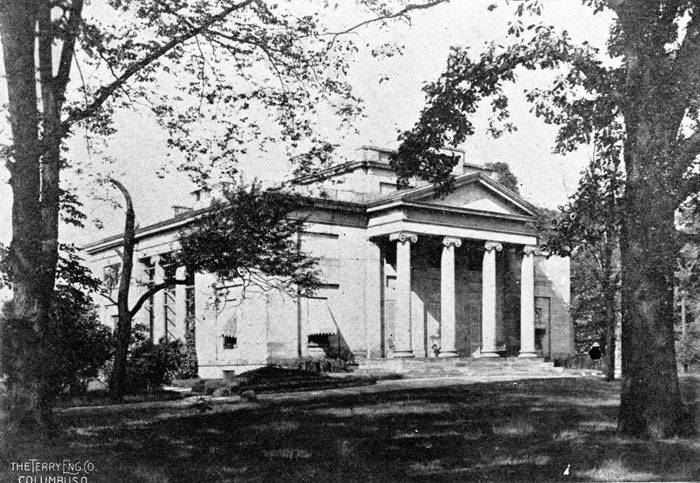
The Alfred Kelley mansion

- Alfred Kelley mansion
- Clinton DeWeese Firestone mansion
- Elam Drake House
- Elijah Pierce Properties
- Frederick Prentiss House
- Frederick W. Schumacher mansion
- Joseph F. Firestone House
- Lucas Sullivant House
- Maria S. Wright House
- McDannald Homestead
- Prentiss-Tulford House

== Schools and education ==
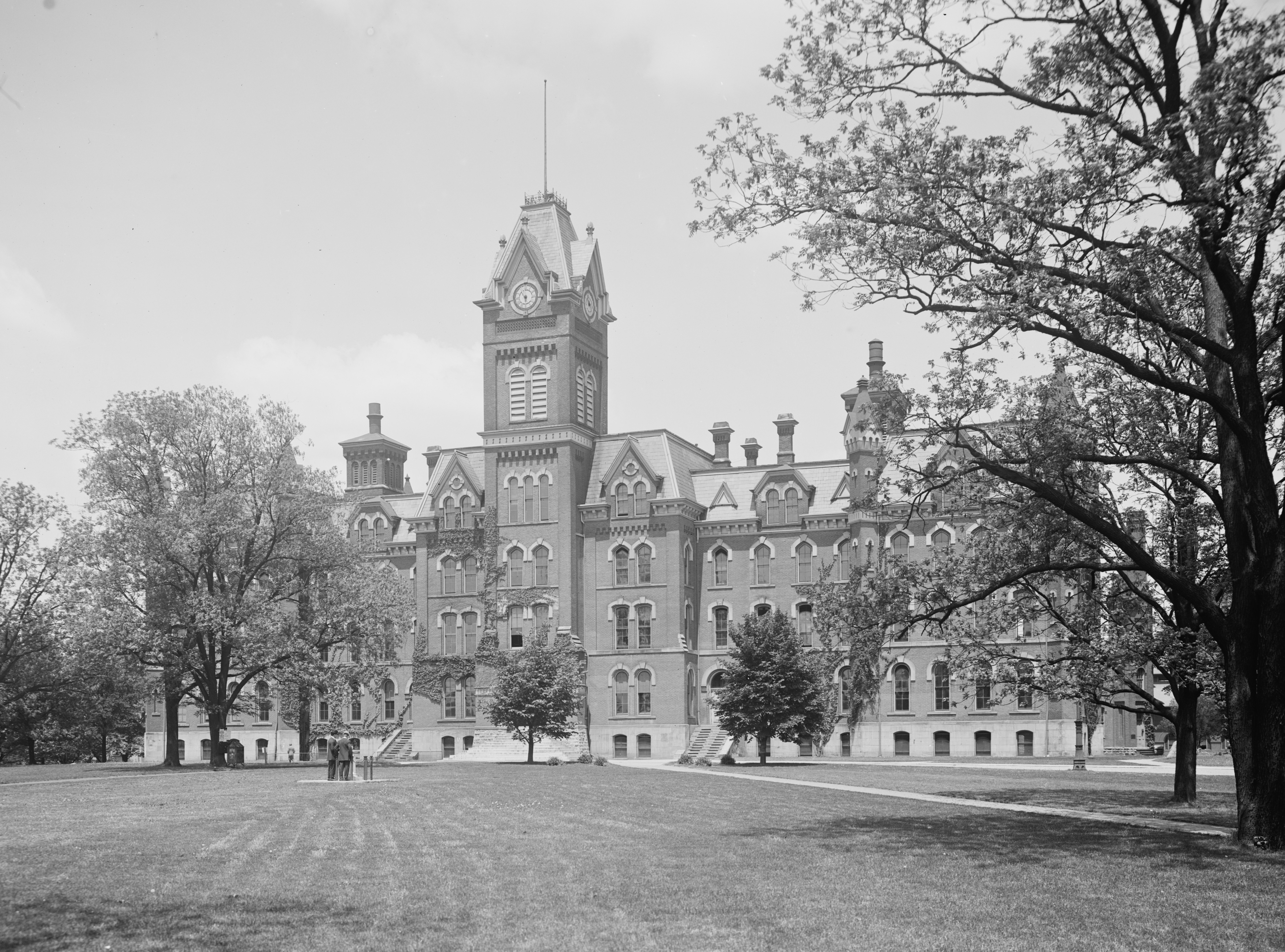
University Hall

- Academy of St. Mary's of the Springs
- Central High School (1862-1928)
- Columbus Public School Library
- McMillin Observatory
- University Hall

== Transportation ==
- Columbus Railway, Power & Light power plant and streetcar barns
- Union Station (three stations, train shed, and arcade)

== See also ==
- Architecture of Columbus, Ohio to find lists of architects and their works
- List of destroyed heritage of the United States
- List of public art in Columbus, Ohio, including several no longer extant
- North Graveyard, no longer extant
- Columbus Landmarks, a preservation organization
- S.G. Loewendick & Sons, known for demolishing city landmarks
