= Fissidens limbatus =

Conservation status
- Apparently Secure (NatureServe)

Scientific classification
- Kingdom: Plantae
- Division: Bryophyta
- Class: Bryopsida
- Subclass: Dicranidae
- Order: Dicranales
- Family: Fissidentaceae
- Genus: Fissidens
- Species: F. limbatus

Binomial name
- Fissidens limbatus Sull.

Synonyms
- Fissidens crispus Mont.; F. limbatus var. brevifolius (Cardot & Thériot) Grout; F. limbatus var. ensiformis Grout; F. pusillus var. brevifolius Cardot & Thériot; F. repandus Wilson; F. tortilis Hampe & Müller Hal.; Fissidens cyprius Jur.; Fissidens herzogii Ruthe ex Herz.

Species of moss

Fissidens limbatus commonly known as Herzog's pocket-moss, is a moss in the family Fissidentaceae. This species is found growing in high elevations in tropical America (especially along the coastal regions of Bolivia) in addition to the US, Mexico and Canada. Montagne first collected F. crispus in 1838.

== Description ==
This is a light to the deep green plant. It grows in small patches with up to 10 mm long and 3 mm wide, 3-20 pairs of leaves. The stem is usually green to orange-red or dark reddish-brown. The central strand in the stem is hardly differentiated. The leaves are very contorted when dry, 2–6 times as long as wide, the leaves are lingulate to narrowly lanceolate with concave sides at the apex. F. limbatus leaves also have cells that are ± bulging (seen on the upper leaf cells) that could only be observed in cross-section.

=== Gametophyte ===
This species, like the rest of the Fissidens genus, is identified by its leaves that are arranged in two rows along the stem and are half-clinging the stem and the rear leaf towards the stem tip. The leaves are unique among other mosses as it has leaves with pocket-like flaps (common name Pocket Moss). The size of the gametophyte is a few millimetres long (measured as the length of the shoot). Sterile stems are often longer than fertile shoots, and plants from caves can produce long shoots with many leaf pairs. Most of the time, the lamina in F. limbatus is unistratose; however, it is partially bistratose occasionally.

==== Leaf structure ====
Each leaf is usually divided into three different parts:

1. The vaginant laminae (or lamina vera) is a boat-shaped or sheathing part of the leaf. The central cells of vaginant lamina somewhat more regularly arranged than ventral and dorsal laminae. The cells in this section are a little longer than wide, up to 12 micrometres wide.
2. The ventral lamina (or the apical lamina): the part of the leaf apical to the vaginant laminae on the upper side of the costa. The central cells of apical and dorsal laminae are unistratose and smooth, up to 12 micrometres wide, hexagonal-rhomboidal shaped with thin walls and no marginal thickenings.
3. The dorsal lamina is the section of the leaf edge opposite the sheathing part and the ventral lamina, extending the total length of the leaf on the backside of the costa. Dorsal lamina is not decurrent, mostly decreased to extinction at the leaf base.

==== Leaf margin ====
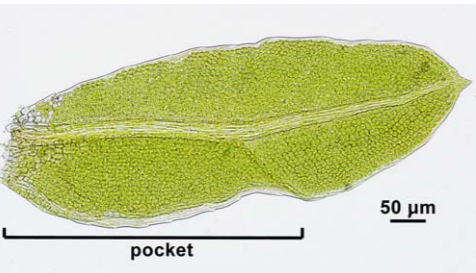
Leaf pocket

Another critical characteristic of the Fissidens limbatus leaf is the leaf margin, which is formed by a border called the limbidium: long, narrow, incrassate cells. These cells in F. limbatus are unistratose to bistratose. Furthermore, sometimes, the limbidium enters the sheathing part (vaginant lamina), which means that the border cells are separated from the margin by a row of chlorophyllose cells. This is called an intralaminar or intramarginal limbidium. The limbidium also connects with the costa at the leaf tip (leaf apex), forming an apiculus, or ending a few cells before the apex. The costa could be up to 25 micrometres at the base (per-current).

==== Rhizoids ====
Rhizoids are usually limited to the bottom of stems and brown in colour ± smooth rhizoids. Sometimes, papillose rhizoids have been reported to occur in F. limbatus.

=== Sporophyte ===
The synoicous in F. limbatus can be autoicous or dioicous. The archegonia could grow up to 240 μm long when the shoot is autoicous; whereas, the antheridia that are carried on short basal branches or unusually small axillary buds, its length range between 120 and 180 μm. Sporophytes are common in this moss and observed most of the time.

The seta is yellowish-red a few millimetres thick (2–6mm) often and ~9 mm long.

==== Capsule ====
The sporangium capsule is very tiny 0.6–1 mm long that is erect or sometimes lightly curved, resembling a shape of an ellipsoid. The immature capsule of F. limbatus is green, and the operculum is fully and prominently enlarged above the annulus. The tip of the operculum is somewhat clear-green in colour. The capsule turns dark green to brown when maturing, except for the apophysis, keeps it light green colour and the operculum that turns red as each sporocyte has experienced meiosis and has produced four spores at this time. The spores of this moss are minute 8–18 μm, yellow with a smooth texture.

==== Peristome teeth ====
Peristomal teeth are present with 21–55.5 μm width at the opening of the capsule with filaments that are somewhat papillose and helical thickenings

== Distribution and habitat ==
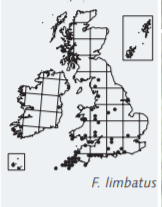
Distribution in the United Kingdom

The species grows in shaded, basic to slightly acidic environment on banks or mineral soil. F. limbatus sometimes grows directly on rocks in sheltered but not wet sites at elevations up to about 1000m.

F. limbatus can be found in North America, Mexico, Central America, West Indies and South America as well as Japan (Honshu).

In North America, this moss can be found along the western coast of the US, Canada and Mexico.

It also occurs in Europe in Hungary and all countries adjacent to Hungary except Austria, Slovenia and Slovakia
