= Great Flood of 1913 in Columbus, Ohio =

1913 flood in the United States

Great Flood of 1913
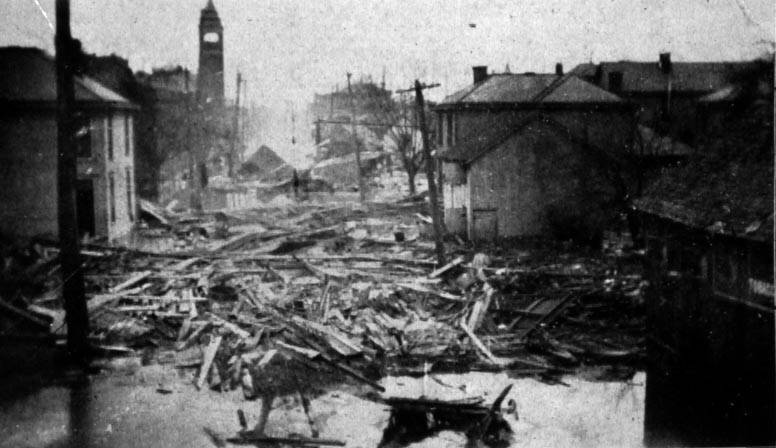
- Mill Street after the flood, with the tower of Engine House No. 6 in the background
- Date: March 24, 1913–March 27, 1913
- Location: Franklinton, Near West Side, Downtown
- Deaths: Approximately 93

The Great Flood of 1913 severely affected Columbus, Ohio. The area most affected was Franklinton, also known as the Bottoms, for its low elevation near the Scioto River. Among many infrastructure projects, a 7.2-mile floodwall was built from 1993 to 2004 to protect most of Franklinton from flooding.

Columbus historian Ed Lentz described the 1913 flood as "the worst catastrophe in the history of Columbus".

== Background ==
Columbus has recorded flooding events since the area was first settled by colonists around 1797, mainly on the banks of the Scioto River. Lucas Sullivant laid out 220 lots in that year, though a flood in 1798 hit the site, forcing Sullivant to plan his settlement, Franklinton, further inland. A flood in 1898 also severely affected the area, creating a lake from the riverbank to Asylum Hill, location of the Columbus State Hospital.

Among about 10 floods between 1798 and 1898, a series of levees was constructed, mostly 30 feet wide and 15 feet tall. As well, the Griggs Dam was completed in 1905, partially to provide flood control.

== 1913 flood ==
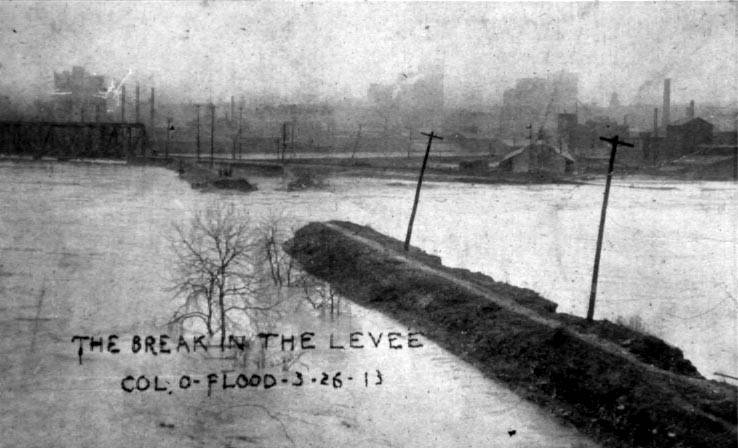
Broken earthen levee, March 26, 1913

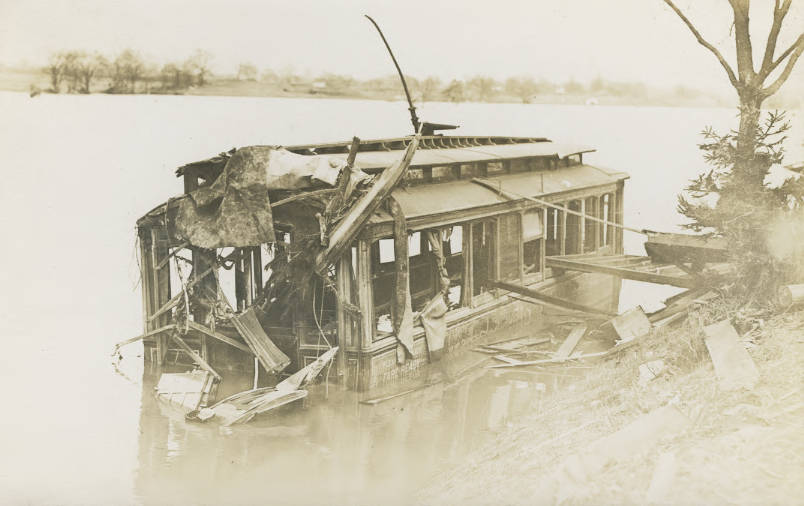
A streetcar found on Greenlawn Avenue, a mile from its tracks

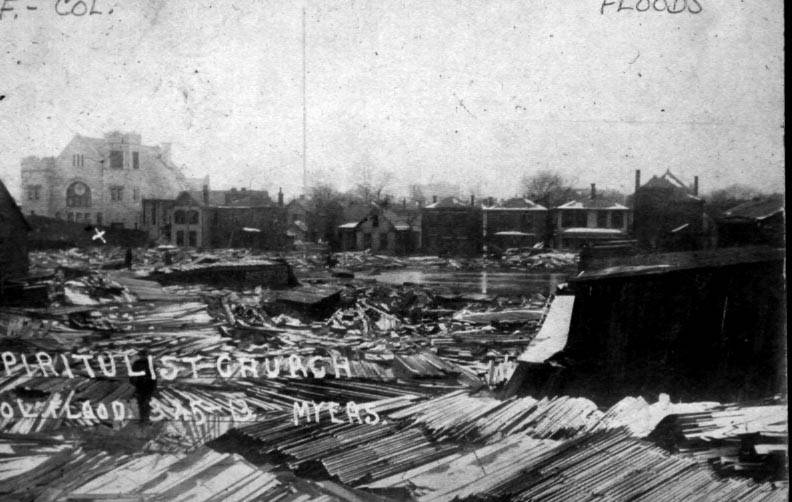
The West Side Spiritualist Church among damaged houses

From March 24 to 27, 1913, Columbus was hit with its worst flood. The flood killed at least 93 in Columbus, and stranded dozens more in their homes.

The weather forecast printed in newspapers on March 24 warned of a storm heading eastward, though it stated "there is no danger of damaging storms in this vicinity." The city had a cold winter, and the ground had not fully thawed, leading to a higher flood risk. Beginning late on March 24 and spanning 24 hours, about 5 inches of rain fell in Central Ohio. Flooding occurred across Ohio, with many of its major rivers flooding. By 2 a.m. on March 25, it became clear that a major flood was developing. By dawn, local fire and police were rescuing residents, and the water level reached knee-level. At 10 a.m., the earthen State Levee, across from the Ohio Penitentiary, collapsed from high water pressure. This led most of Franklinton to be under 7 to 17 feet of water. Residents fled to buildings' second floors and attics, though many homes were lifted off their foundations. Some people were forced to climb trees to escape the flood waters. By nightfall, the temperature dropped, and some exhausted residents fell into the waters.

Amid the flooding, Columbus Dispatch publisher Robert F. Wolfe saw the water rising from his office. Wolfe, a property owner at Buckeye Lake, knew there were many boats in winter storage there. He chartered a train and sent it with volunteers to collect the boats. The boats helped local residents save flood victims during the crisis. Over the next five days of high waters, the local government, countless volunteers, and five National Guard companies rescued people and worked to save properties.

The flooding shut down the city for five days, and the west side of Columbus for six weeks. An estimated 93 people died. Every bridge in downtown Columbus was destroyed, except the Rich Street Bridge, which ironically had been condemned, somehow survived. Two railroad bridges survived, although much of the railroad tracks had been washed away in Franklinton.

== Impacts and subsequent events ==
The flood led to significant rebuilding and infrastructure improvements over time. New bridges and levees were constructed, and the Columbus Civic Center was built on the east bank of the river downtown. In 1916, voters approved a $3.5 million plan to control flooding, after state and conservancy programs were not approved. The Scioto River was doubled in width, and its channel was deepened.

The flood led much of Franklinton's residents and businesses to relocate to the Hilltop, at a higher elevation, prompting Franklinton's long decline. Another flood took place in 1959, after an earthen levee broke. In the next decade, the levee was reinforced. Congress also approved a flood insurance act, making cities that adopt floodplain maps and restrict development in those areas eligible for insurance; Columbus joined the program in 1971. In 1983, FEMA created a map designating nearly all of Franklinton as a floodplain, and thus Columbus City Council severely restricted new construction in the area.

=== Floodwall ===
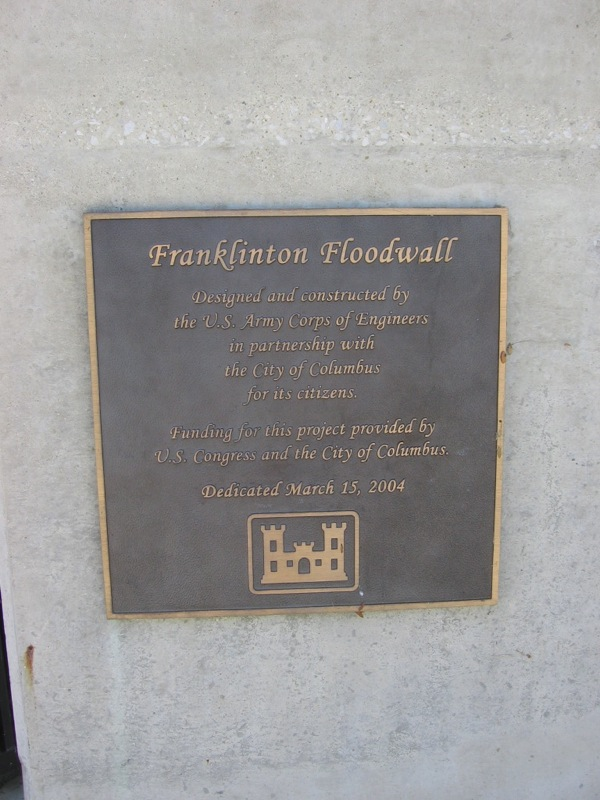
Floodwall dedication plaque

In 1986, the U.S. Army Corps of Engineers recommended a 3.25-mile floodwall and levee system, with an initial cost of $30.9 million. Its design funding and construction was approved in 1988, and its first floodgate was tested in 1990. In 1993, the Army Corps of Engineers awarded its first construction contract, reinforcing a levee. The entire project was then estimated at $107 million. On Columbus Day in 1993, politicians celebrated the breaking ground of the floodwall project. In 1998, president Bill Clinton proposed a budget that would reduce funding for the floodwall from $11.3 million to $1.8 million, with $49 million already spent on the project. In 1999, U.S. Representative Deborah Pryce spurred the House Appropriations Committee to keep construction going. President Bush's 2002 budget provided $11 million for the final phase of the wall. In 2002, after two failures, the floodwall's sliding floodgates pass a high-pressure water test. The 7.2-mile floodwall, finally completed, was dedicated in March 2004, at a final cost of $134 million.

Even with the floodwall completed, about 700 of the 2,800 acres behind the floodwall were still deemed at risk of floods due to poor drainage. These properties retained their building restrictions and flood-insurance requirements.

=== Subsequent events ===
In 2019, the Southern Theatre in downtown Columbus hosted The Flood, an original opera about the 1913 flood. The opera featured the psychological trauma of four generations of residents affected by the flood. A new development on the Scioto Peninsula in Franklinton aims to install outdoor pylons with a line depicting the high water mark from the 1913 flood. As well, a street running through the development will be named High Water Alley.

Today, there is no remaining evidence of the flood – ruins or damage, though its effects can be seen with the redeveloped downtown civic center, riverbank retaining walls, and public works projects to prevent further devastating floods.

== Gallery ==
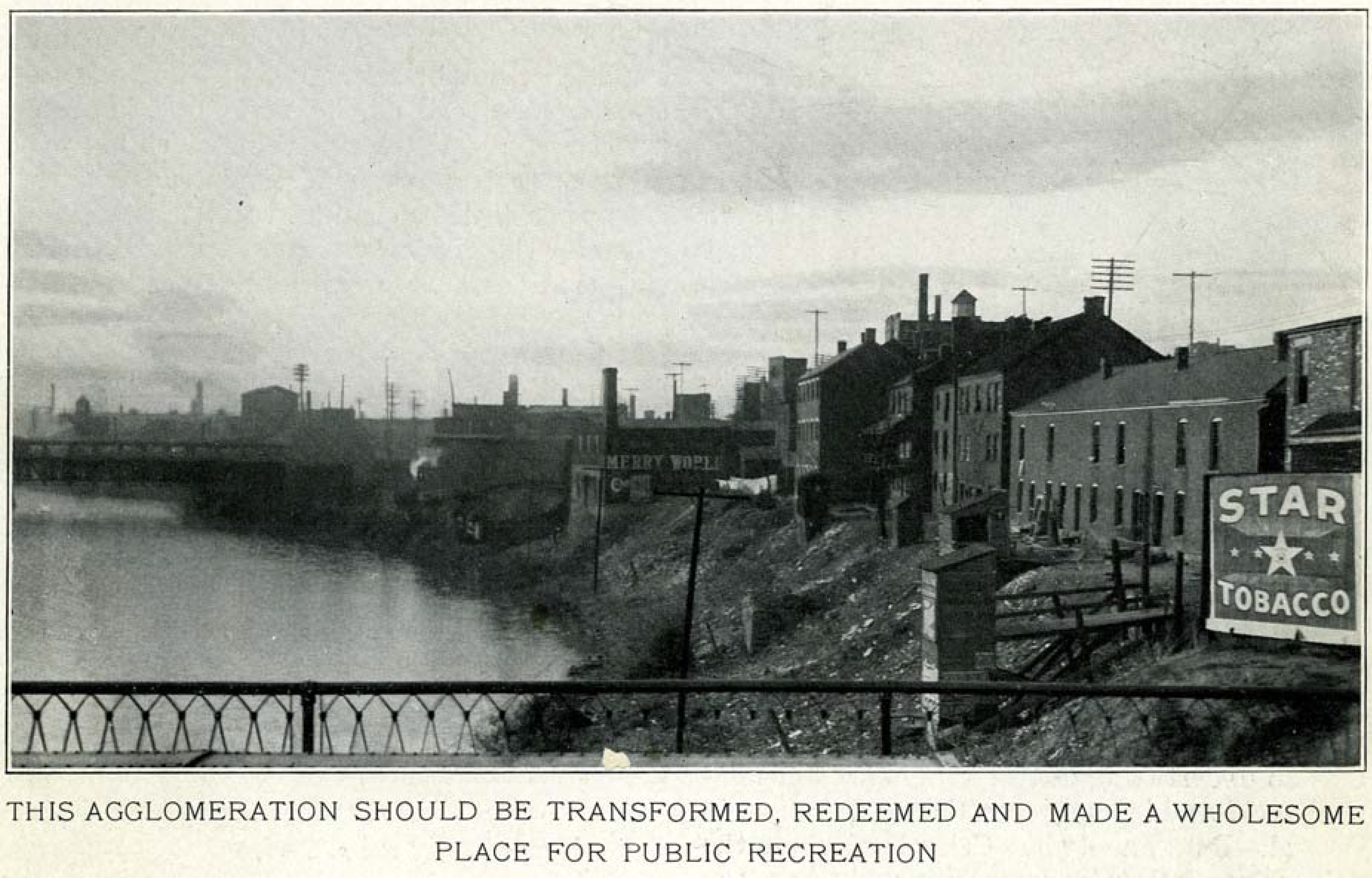
Riverside condition in 1908

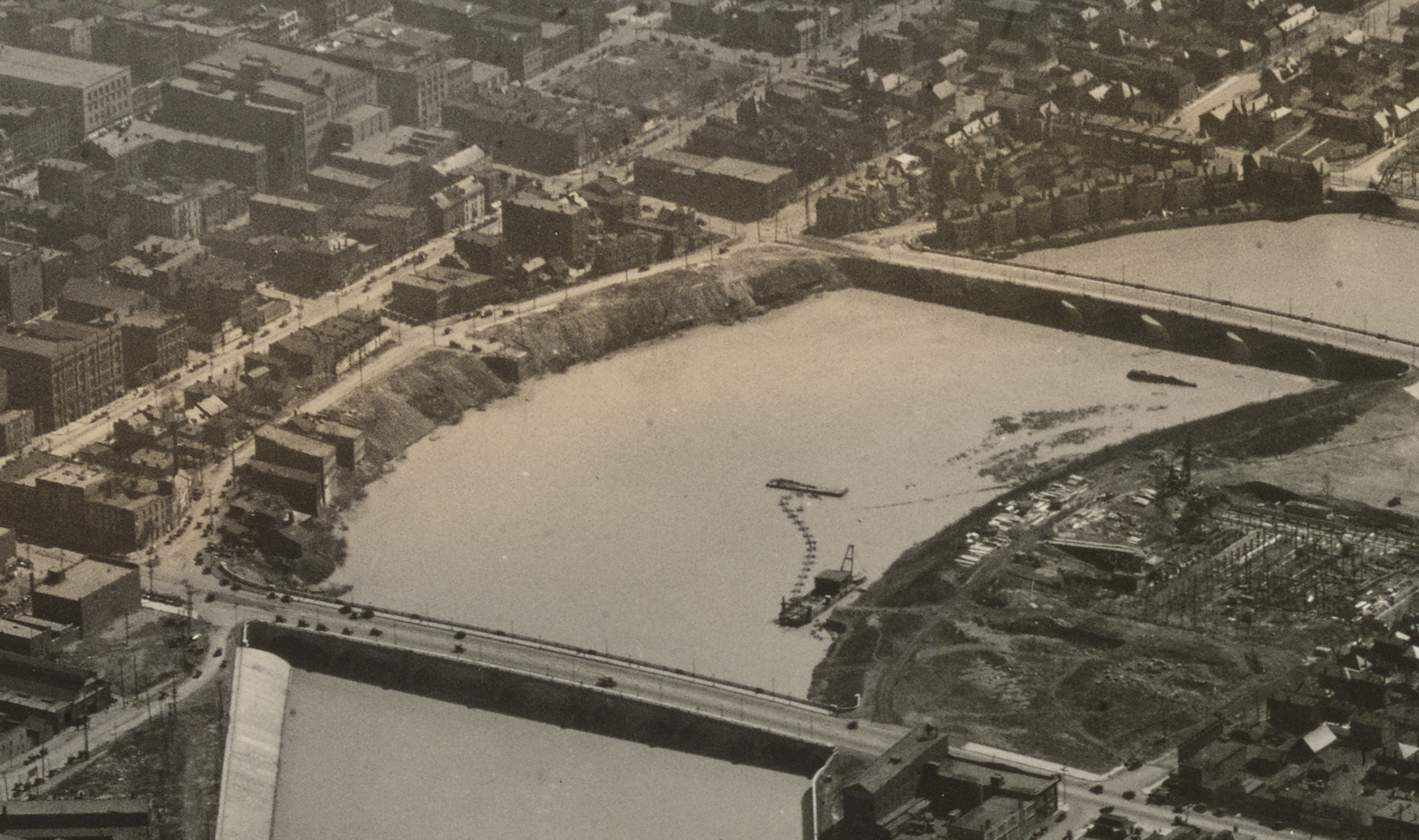
Downtown c. 1923, with new bridges and a widened river

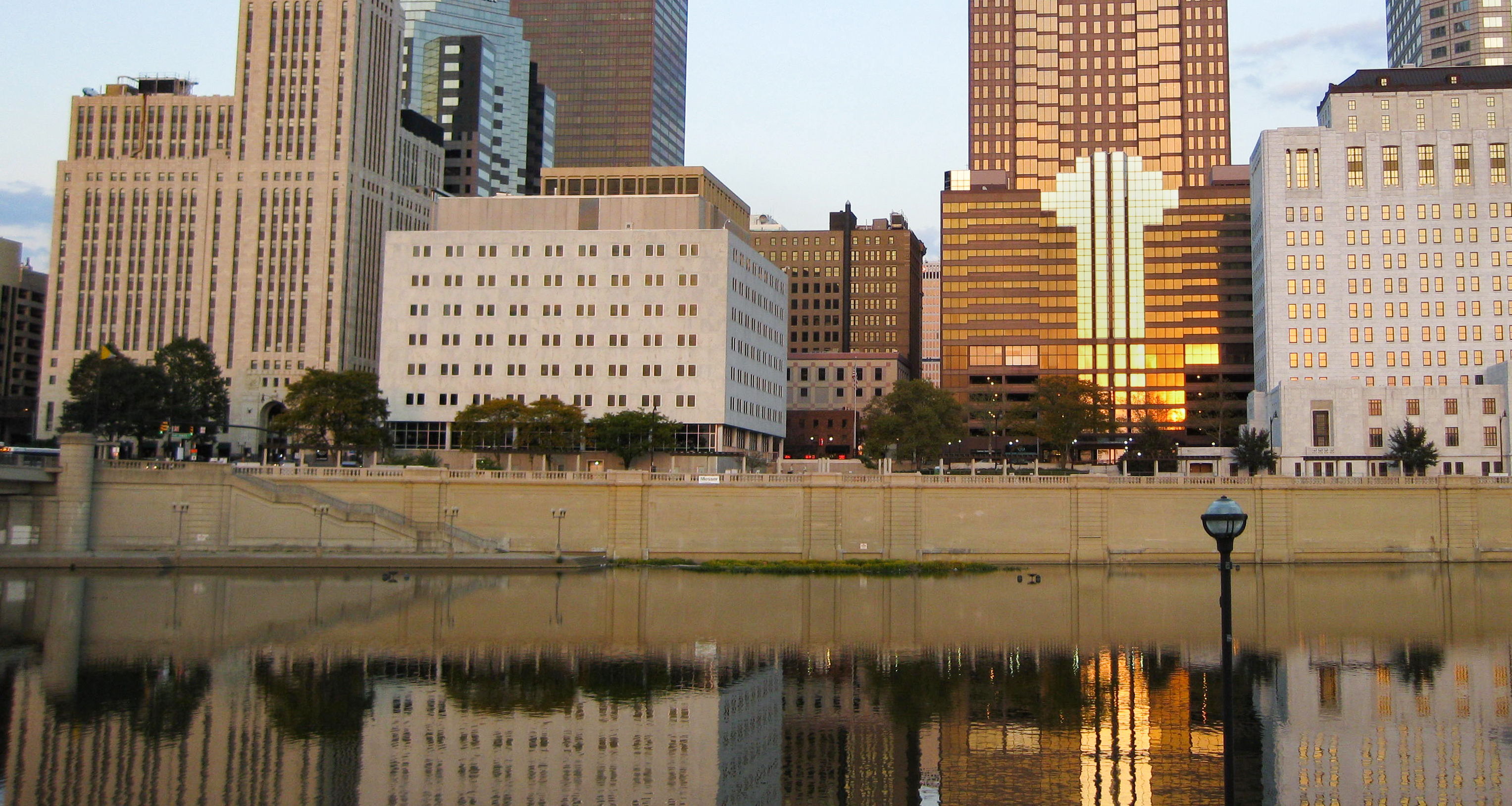
The 1920s-built retaining wall on the east side of the Scioto River downtown

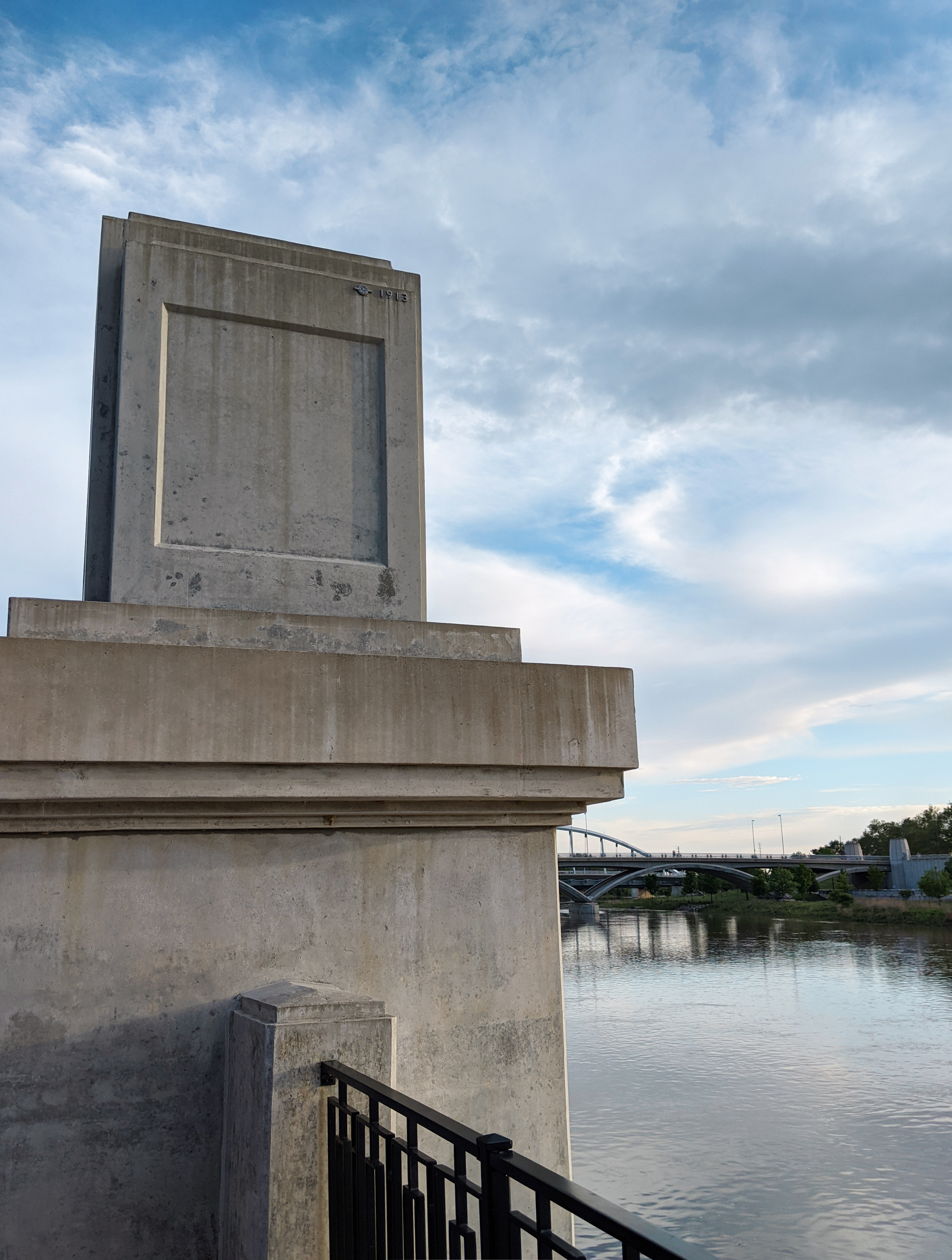
Pillar at the Scioto Mile Promenade depicting the high water mark
