= Frederick Prentiss House =

Historic house in Ohio, United States

- U.S. National Register of Historic Places
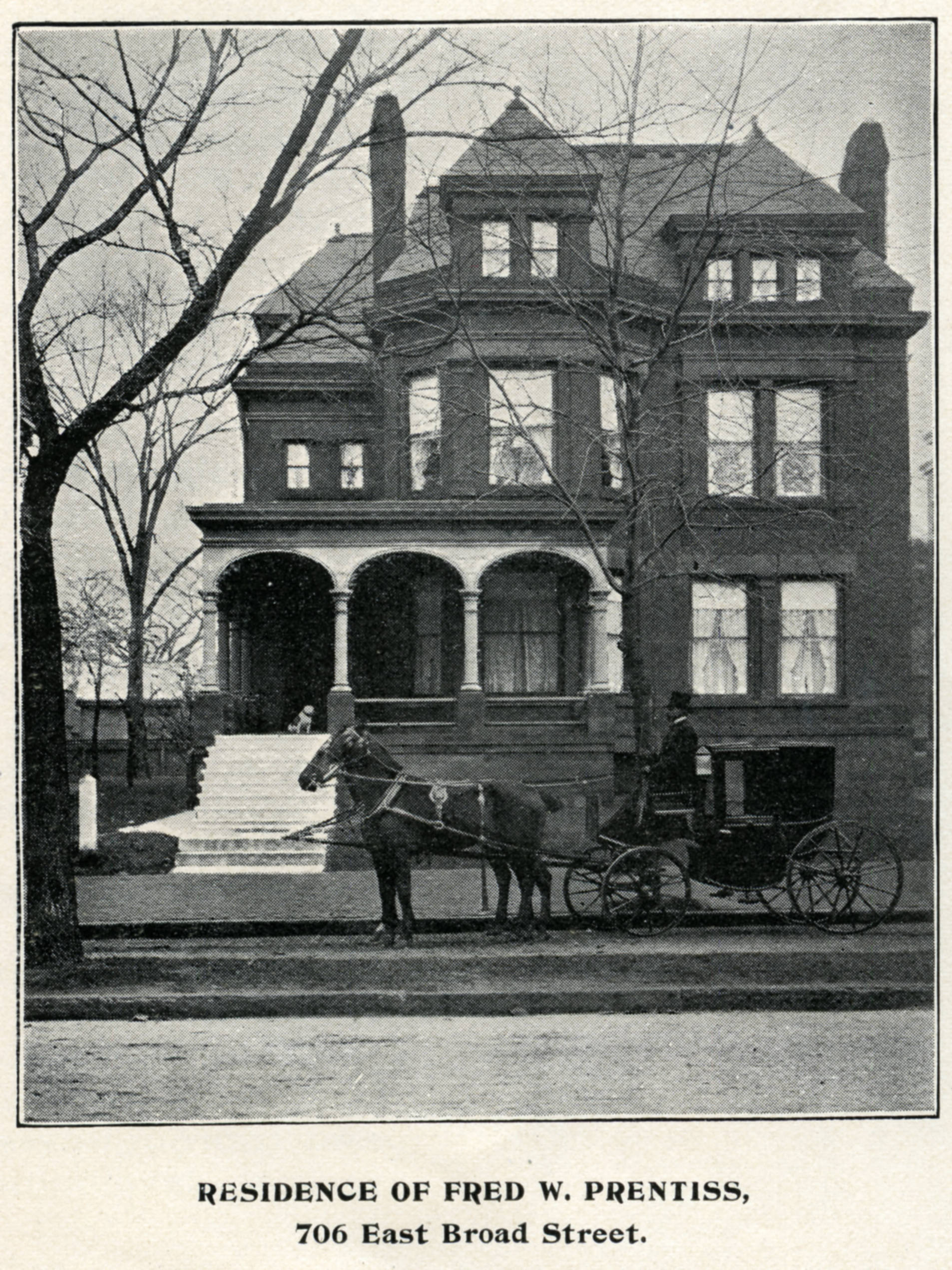
- Interactive map highlighting the building's location
- Location: 706 E. Broad St., Columbus, Ohio
- Coordinates: 39.964690°N 82.981904°W
- Built: 1890
- Architectural style: Italianate, Queen Anne
- MPS: East Broad Street MRA
- NRHP reference No.: 86003396
- Added to NRHP: December 17, 1986

The Frederick Prentiss House was a historic house in Columbus, Ohio, United States. The house was built in 1890 and was listed on the National Register of Historic Places in 1986. The Frederick Prentiss House was built at a time when East Broad Street was a tree-lined avenue featuring the most ornate houses in Columbus; the house reflected the character of the area at the time.

The house was built in 1890 and designed with Italianate and Queen Anne influences. It was built for Frederick Prentiss, president of the Hayden-Clinton National Bank. His family occupied the house until 1938.

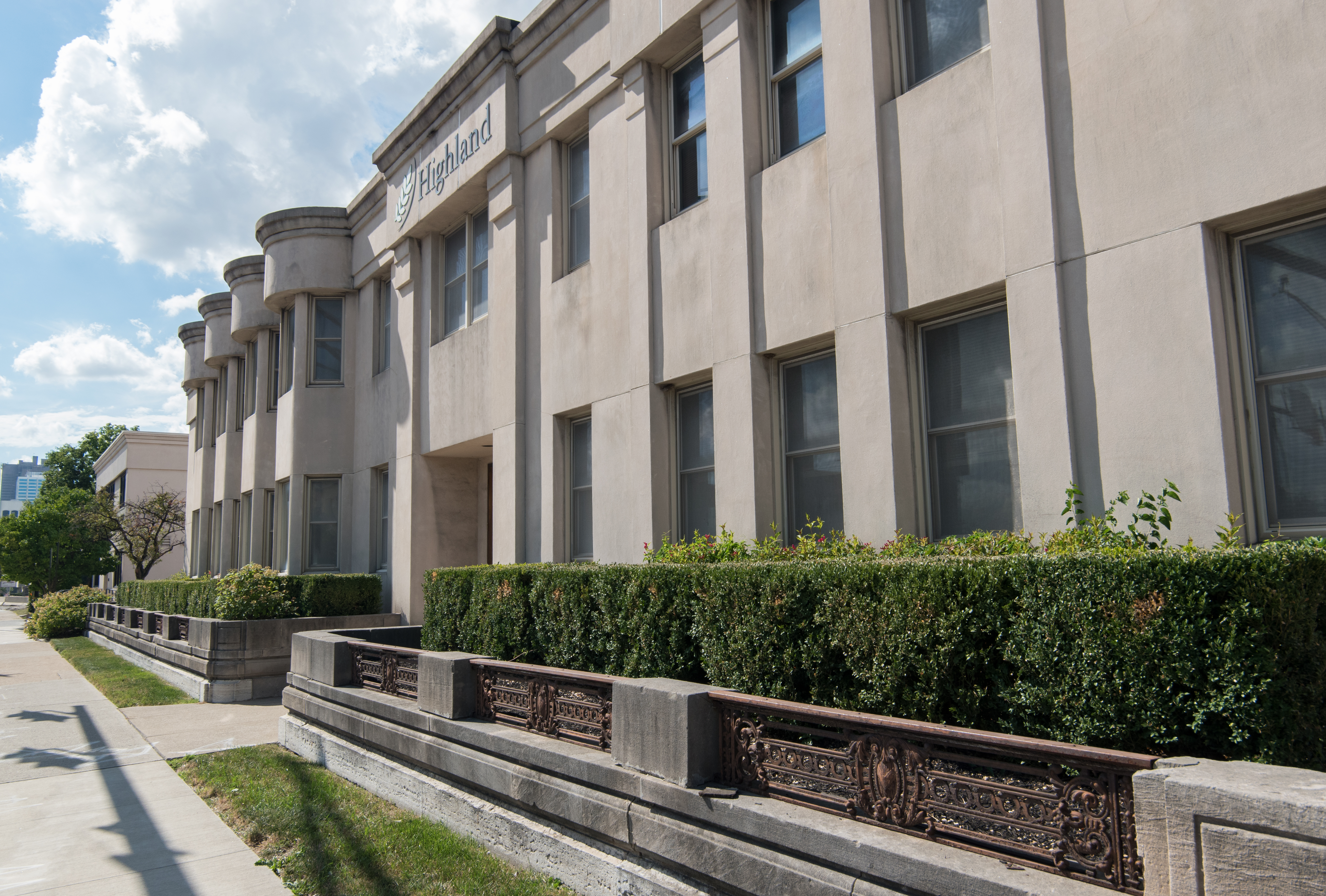
Present-day site of the house, 2020

== See also ==
- List of demolished buildings and structures in Columbus, Ohio
- National Register of Historic Places listings in Columbus, Ohio
