= Sullivant =

Sullivant is a surname. Notable people called Sullivant include:

- Arthur Sullivant Hoffman (1876–1966), American magazine editor
- Hank Sullivant (born 1983), American rock musician and record producer
- Lucas Sullivant (1765–1823), the founder of Franklinton, Ohio
- T. S. Sullivant (1854–1926), American cartoonist
- William Starling Sullivant (1803–1873), early American botanist

== See also ==
- Lucas Sullivant House, Franklinton, Ohio
- Sullivant Township, Ford County, Illinois
- Harrison House and Sullivant Land Office, East Franklinton, Columbus, Ohio
- Sullivant Land Office, East Franklinton, Columbus, Ohio
- Sullivant Moss Society, or American Bryological and Lichenological Society
