= Main Bar =

Former bar in Columbus, Ohio

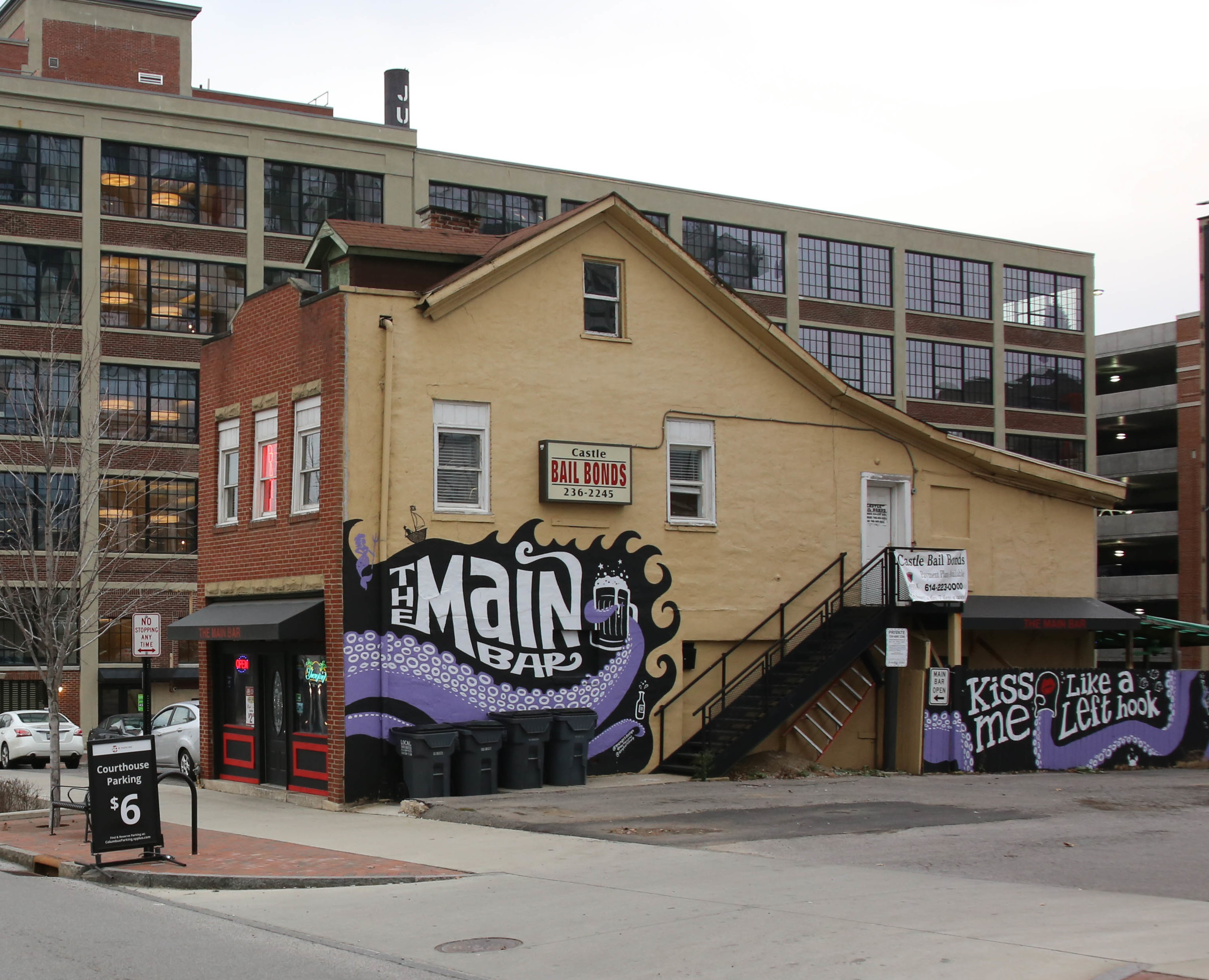
- The building in 2016
- Interactive map of the Main Bar area

General information
- Status: Demolished
- Location: 16 W. Main Street, Columbus, Ohio
- Coordinates: 39.956258°N 83.000105°W
- Completed: c. 1887
- Demolished: October 2021

Technical details
- Floor count: 2
- Floor area: 1,800 sq ft (170 m^{2})

The Main Bar was a historic building in Downtown Columbus, Ohio. The two-story building was constructed as early as 1887, and held numerous commercial and residential uses. Its latest tenant, The Main Bar, opened around 2000 and closed in 2021. The building was demolished in October 2021.

== Attributes ==
The two-story building had 1,800 square feet (170 m^{2}). At the time of demolition, it was surrounded by parking lots and new development. The building had a shotgun layout, with one narrow bar room leading to another, leading to a back porch.

The bar that operated in the building was a typical dive bar that drew a diverse crowd of people, including from nearby apartments, hotels, courthouses, and office buildings.

== History ==
The building has an unknown date of construction, and appeared on maps as early as 1887. A bar opened there as early as 1890 as the Hare and Corbin saloon. It subsequently saw numerous residential and commercial uses. The Main Bar owners purchased the business in 2000.

The building and property owner, developer and attorney Scott Schiff, attempted to evict the bar in 2015, along with surrounding properties. The bar owner successfully resisted the eviction attempts at the time, though properties around it were demolished or developed, leaving the historic building standing alone. In the same year, the site was listed as one of the region's most endangered sites, as recorded by Columbus Landmarks. The property remained on the organization's endangered site list until demolition.

In February 2021, the bar closed, amid the COVID-19 pandemic. The bar owner decided to close due to low foot traffic during the pandemic, a rough cycle of closings and reopenings, and the tight space not ideal during COVID operating restrictions. The property owner planned to demolish the building. At the bar's closing announcement that February, Schiff stated he had no site plans, but aimed to use the space for seven parking spaces for now. The Columbus Downtown Commission approved the building's demolition in June 2021, following two engineer reports that supported demolition, despite no specific plan for new development on the site. The public reacted critically on social media, expressing that surface parking is already overabundant, and that historic building losses are already substantial downtown. The building was demolished in October 2021.
