= West Side Spiritualist Church =

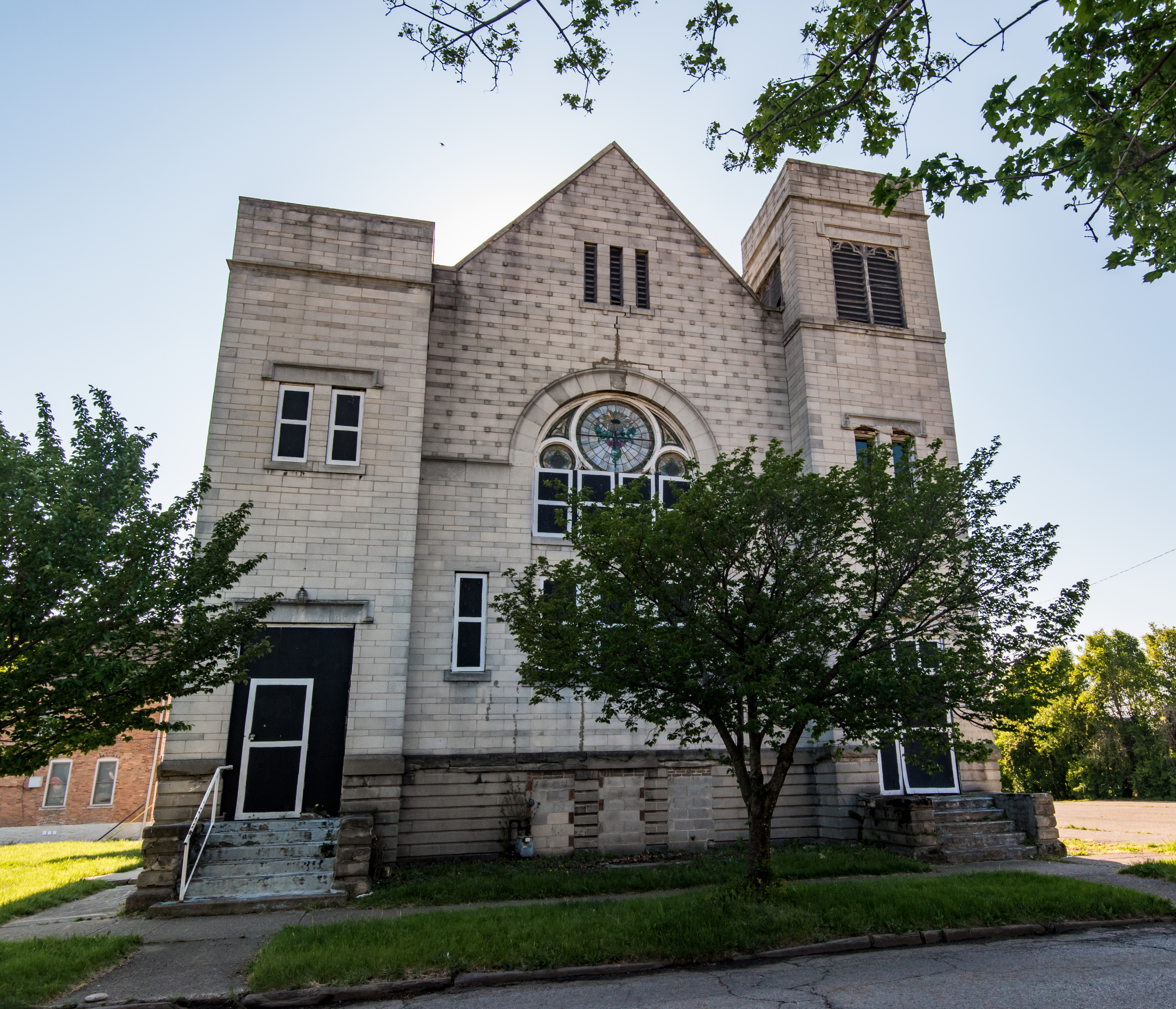
- The church in 2020
- West Side Spiritualist Church
- 39.958998°N 83.013349°W
- Location: 79 McDowell Street, Columbus, Ohio
- Country: United States
- Denomination: Apostolic
- Previous denomination: Spiritualist

History
- Founded: May 1901
- Founder: Harry Boerstler
- Dedicated: March 1912

Architecture
- Completed: 1912

The West Side Spiritualist Church was a historic church building in Franklinton, Columbus, Ohio. The Spiritualist church was built in 1912 for the congregation of Harry Boerstler, who moved to the neighborhood in 1900 to bring hope to its working-class people. The congregation lasted until about 1948, and the building later housed the Boerstler Memorial Spiritualist Temple and the Greater Christ Temple Apostolic Church. After years of vacancy, the church building was approved to be demolished for affordable housing, to accompany an upscale mixed-use development nearby, despite opposition from preservationists.

== History ==
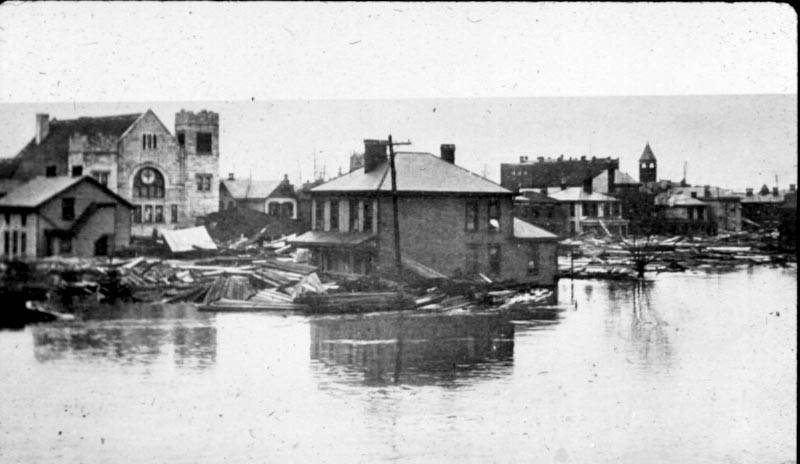
The church during the Great Flood of 1913

The community Spiritualist church was founded in May 1901, in the home of Harry Boerstler at State and McDowell Streets. Boerstler had moved to the neighborhood in 1900 to provide hope, as well as something to believe in, for the working-class neighborhood. The building's land was deeded to the West Side Spiritualist Church by a congregation member in 1911, with a property value of $17,000. The only conditions were for $2,000, a memorial window dedicated to her, and expenses covered for her funeral.

The church was built in 1912, and dedicated in March of that year. It survived the Great Flood of 1913 which devastated the surrounding neighborhood. The church took in about 400 people during the flooding. The church congregation grew under Boerstler's leadership until his retirement in 1930. Assistant Pastor John Johnson took up his role. The church closed numerous times due to falling attendance, and permanently shuttered around 1948; Johnson died that year. In 1950, the church took up a new congregation, under the name of Boerstler Memorial Spiritualist Temple. The building became the Greater Christ Temple Apostolic Church and opened on April 14, 1974. The congregation moved out of the building around 2008. The church became owned by Columbus's landbank in 2013.

Also in 2013, the community service-oriented choir group the Harmony Project planned to renovate the building, creating a community event venue and new home for the organization. The plan never materialized.

After about seven years of vacancy, preservationists hoped to turn the site into a community space in order to preserve it. Homeport, a nonprofit affordable housing developer, began planning an affordable residence on the site, with an initial aim to salvage parts of the church or its materials (later found to be not financially feasible). Thus in February 2019, the East Franklinton Review Board approved its demolition. The church was included in Columbus Landmarks' annual Most Endangered Buildings list that year; the organization also directly stated its opposition to the building's demolition. The site is currently planned to become a $10.9 million four-story affordable residence. The building will have 50 units, aimed to house residents at 80 percent or less of a $42,800 income. The developer aims to demolish and rebuild in conjunction with Gravity 2.0, a luxury apartment complex planned to be built opposite the site.

The East Franklinton Review Board chairman expressed regret over the building's planned demolition, though stated that the board was persuaded there was no way to save the church or any portion of it, and that the city had made every reasonable effort to find a use for the building.

The structure was torn down after 2022 and the McDowell Place apartments opened in 2024. Nothing of the previous structure remains.

== Architecture ==
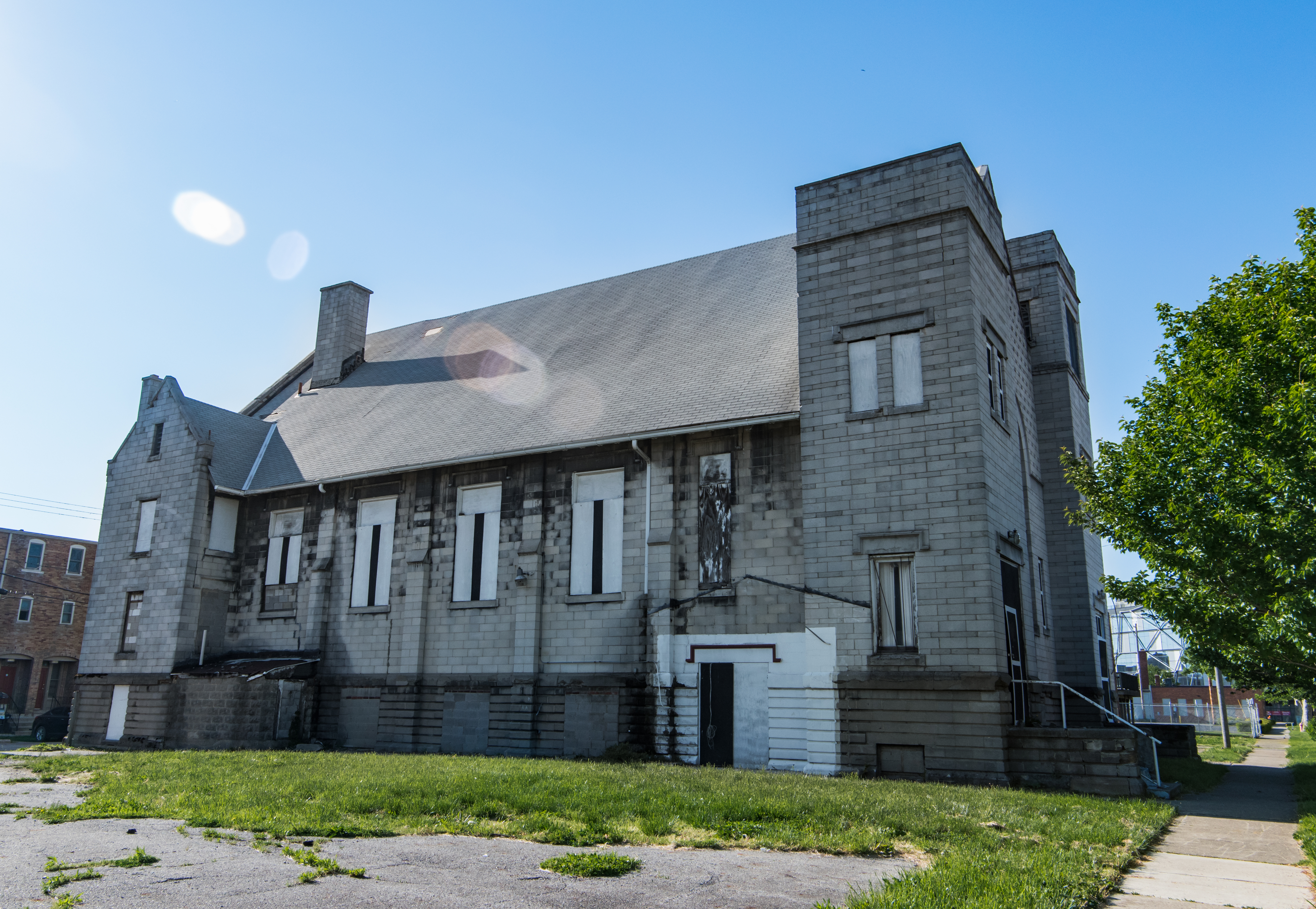
South facade, 2020

The building had elements of Greek and Romanesque Revival styles and was an early utilization of decorative concrete. The structure had two asymmetrical towers between a gabled main facade, with entrances at each tower. Central to the facade was an arched opening which has a rose window and stone tracery. The exterior walls were made up of concrete masonry units. A new cornerstone read "Greater Christ Temple Apostolic Church" and "1974"; it replaced the original cornerstone.

The building had two stories. It stood adjacent to a brick house, built before 1887 and donated to the church.
