= Hanford Village George Washington Carver Addition Historic District =

Historic district in Ohio, United States

- U.S. National Register of Historic Places
- U.S. Historic district
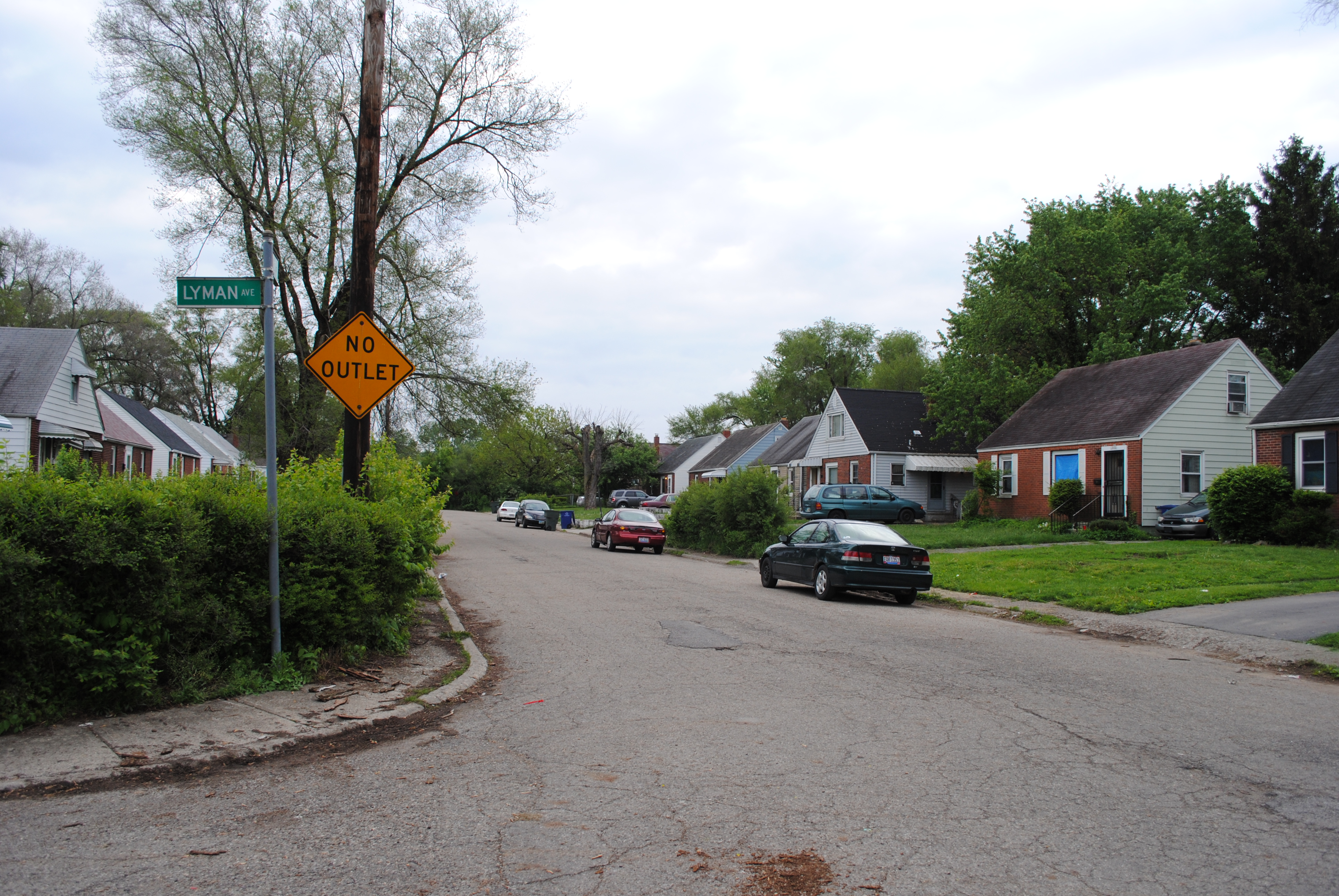
- Interactive map
- Location: 1918-1939 and 2012-2030 Kent and 783-879 Lyman Sts., 822-1958 Clay Ct., 851-853 Bowman Ave., and Hanford Park, Columbus, Ohio
- Coordinates: 39.950556°N 82.946111°W
- NRHP reference No.: 13000980
- Added to NRHP: December 24, 2013

The Hanford Village George Washington Carver Addition Historic District is a historic district in the Hanford Village neighborhood of Columbus, Ohio. It was listed on the National Register of Historic Places in 2013. At the time of nomination, the site consisted of 95 buildings, sites, or structures, 76 of which are contributing. Most are one-and-a-half-story gabled Cape Cod houses with simplified Colonial Revival features.

The George Washington Carver Addition is significant as part of a historic suburban municipality built for African American World War II veterans. The district illustrates the struggles and limits that Black citizens had in a segregated society. The district is also notable as the home of many of the Tuskegee Airmen while they operated out of the nearby Lockbourne Army Airport.

== See also ==
- National Register of Historic Places listings in Columbus, Ohio
