= McDannald Homestead =

Historic house in Ohio, United States

- U.S. National Register of Historic Places
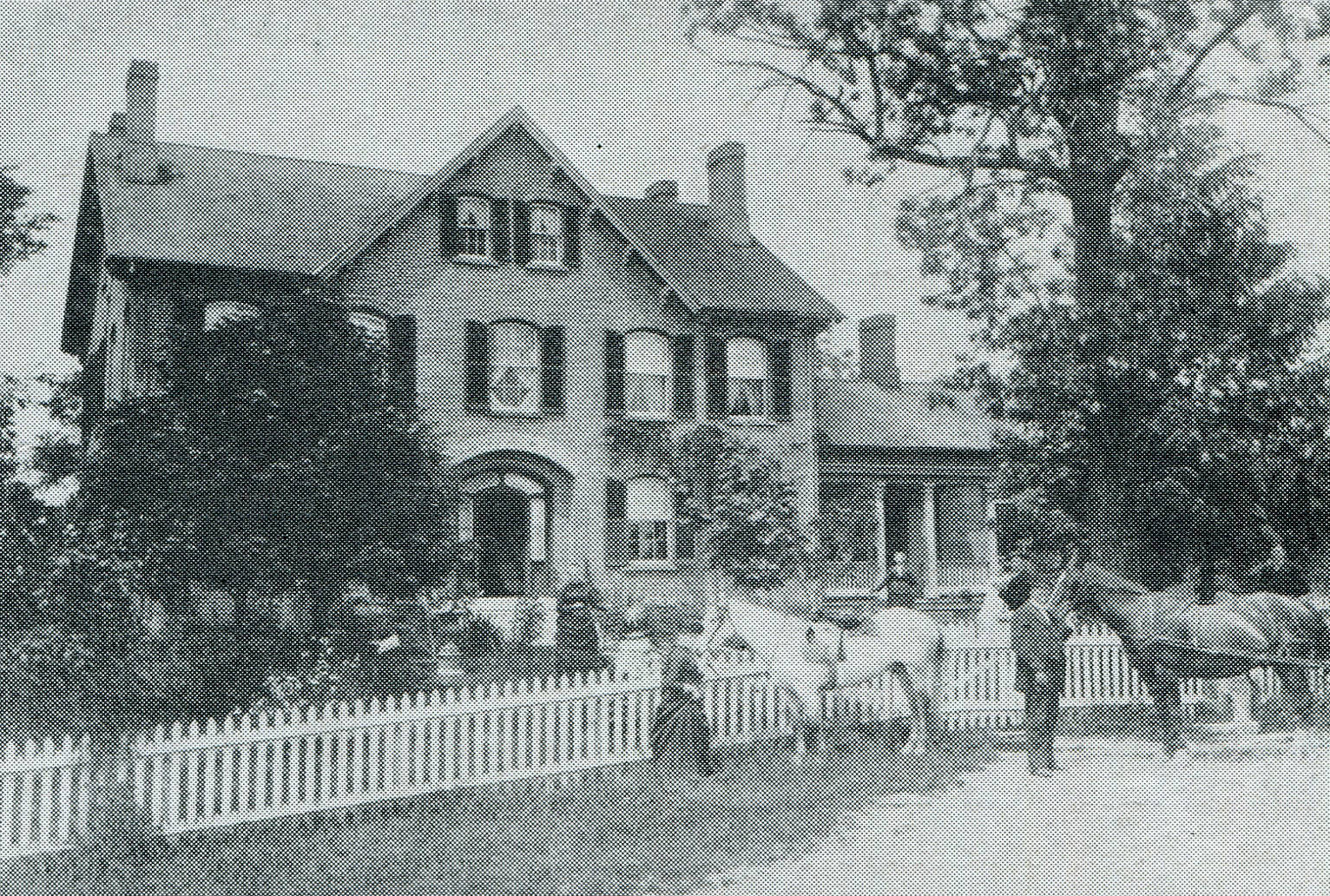
- Undated image of the homestead
- Interactive map highlighting the site of the building
- Location: 5847 Sunbury Rd., Columbus, Ohio
- Coordinates: 40.077598°N 82.896861°W
- Built: c. 1850
- Demolished: 1993
- NRHP reference No.: 78002066
- Added to NRHP: February 17, 1978

The McDannald Homestead was a house in Columbus, Ohio. It was built c. 1850 and was listed on the National Register of Historic Places in 1978. The house was one of the largest and best preserved rural residential buildings in Franklin County. The house was a sanctuary stop on the Underground Railroad. It was demolished by Allstate on September 24, 1993, as the organization had planned to build a commercial office park there. Then-city councilor Michael Coleman expressed that it could have been saved if added to the Columbus Register of Historic Properties, which had just added demolition restrictions that July.

The house had two and a half stories, and was built of red brick made on-site. It had thirteen rooms, mostly large, square, and with tall ceilings. The house was largely constructed from materials on the land, including walnut and cherry wood, though the parlor utilized pine transported from Michigan. The architect and builder are both unknown, though it is presumed Randal R. Arnold, a master carpenter who built many houses in the surrounding Blendon Township, also constructed this one.

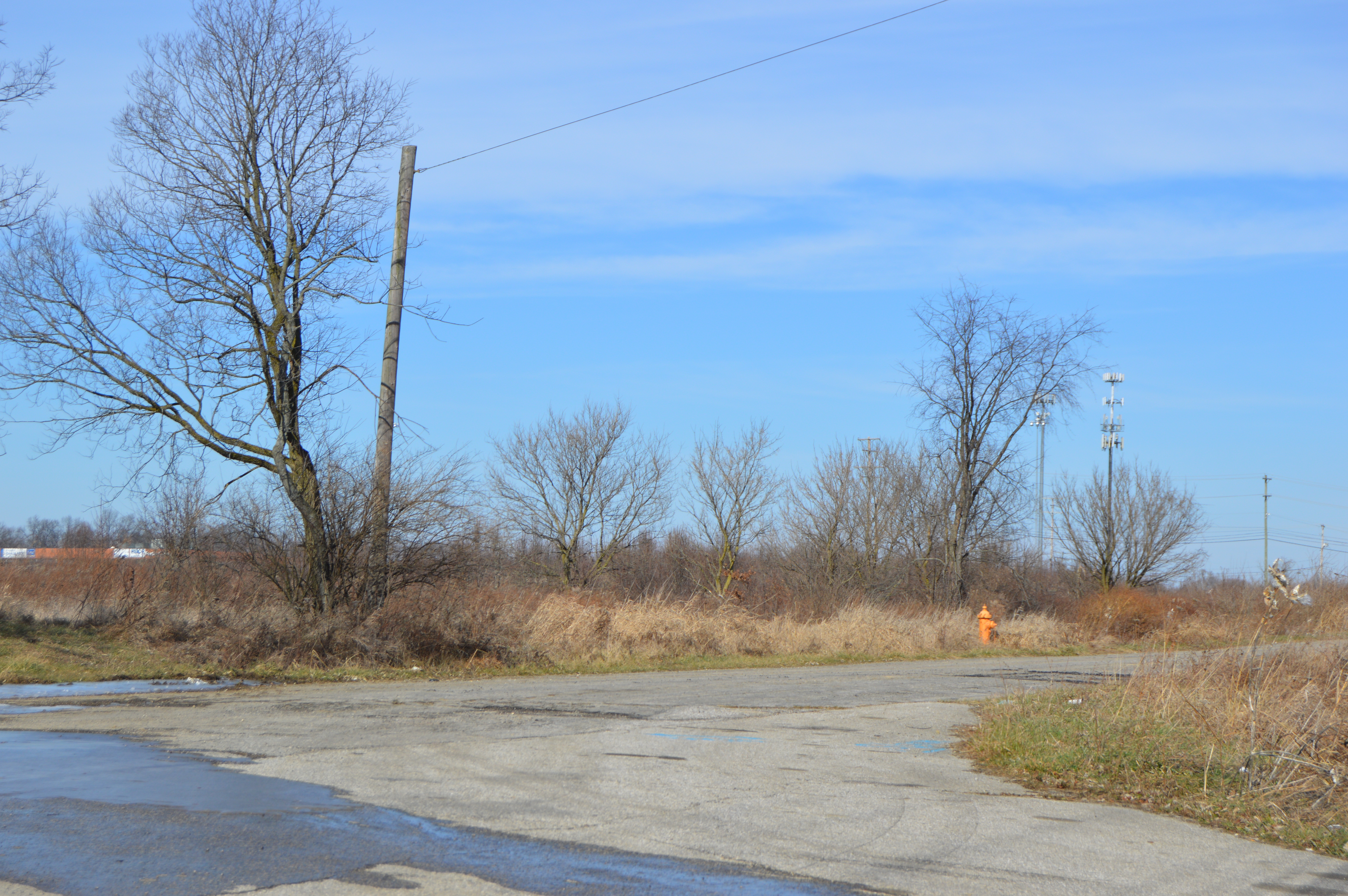
Site of the homestead in 2015

== See also ==
- National Register of Historic Places listings in Columbus, Ohio
