= Lucas Sullivant House =

Former house of Lucas Sullivant in Franklinton, Columbus, Ohio

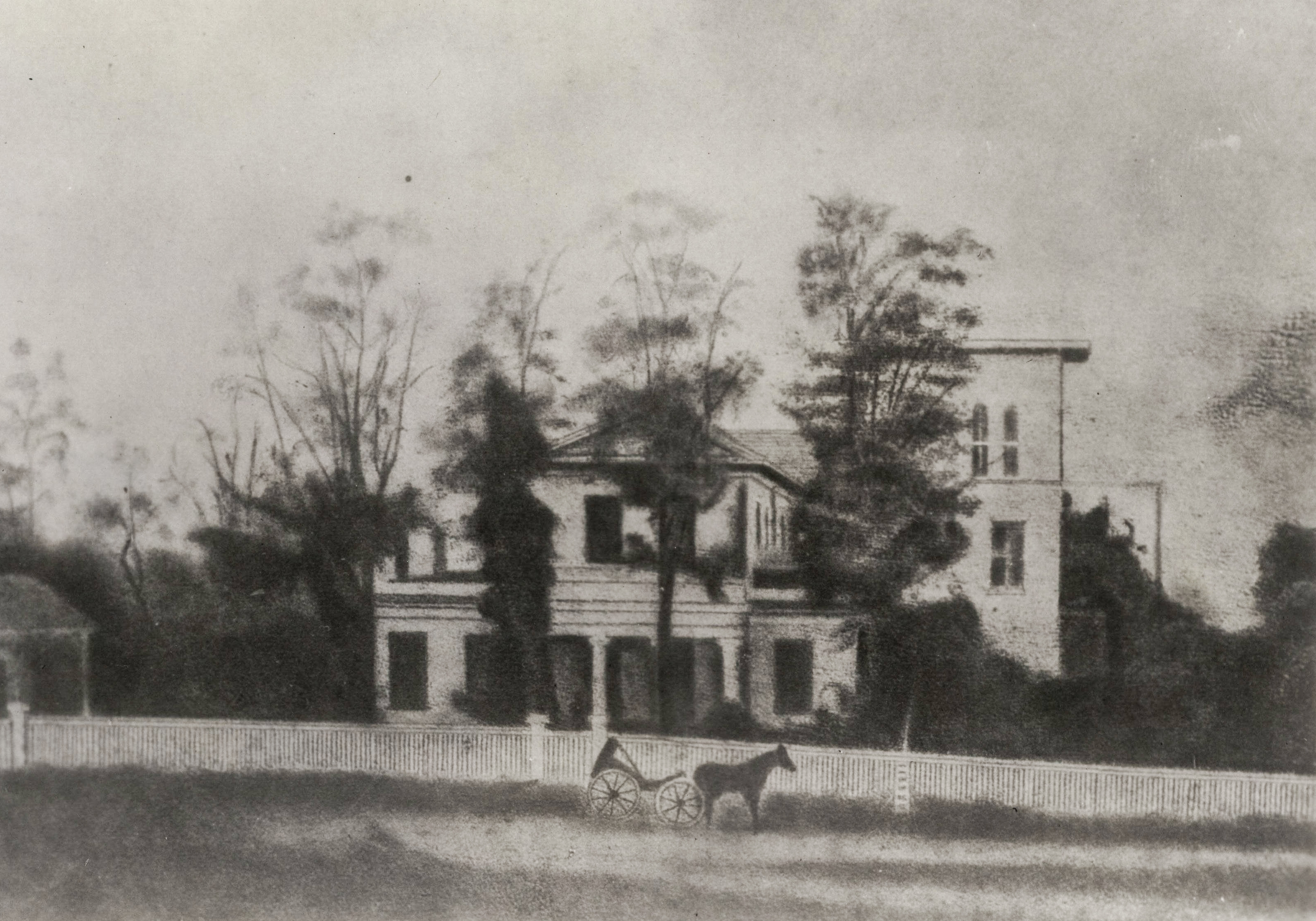
- Interactive map of the Lucas Sullivant House area
- Former names: Good Shepherd School; St. Euphrasia School; Rosemont School

General information
- Location: Franklinton, Columbus, Ohio, 707 West Broad Street
- Coordinates: 39°57′34.78″N 83°1′10.06″W
- Year built: 1801
- Demolished: February 4, 1965
- Owner: Lucas Sullivant (1801–1823)

The Lucas Sullivant House was a brick residence at 707 West Broad Street in Franklinton, now a neighborhood of Columbus, constructed in 1801 by Lucas Sullivant, the founder of Franklinton and one of the original proprietors of Columbus. The house was the first brick structure built in what became Franklin County. It served for more than sixty years as the home of the Sullivant family before passing into use as a religious school. The building was demolished on February 4, 1965. The site is currently vacant.

== Background ==
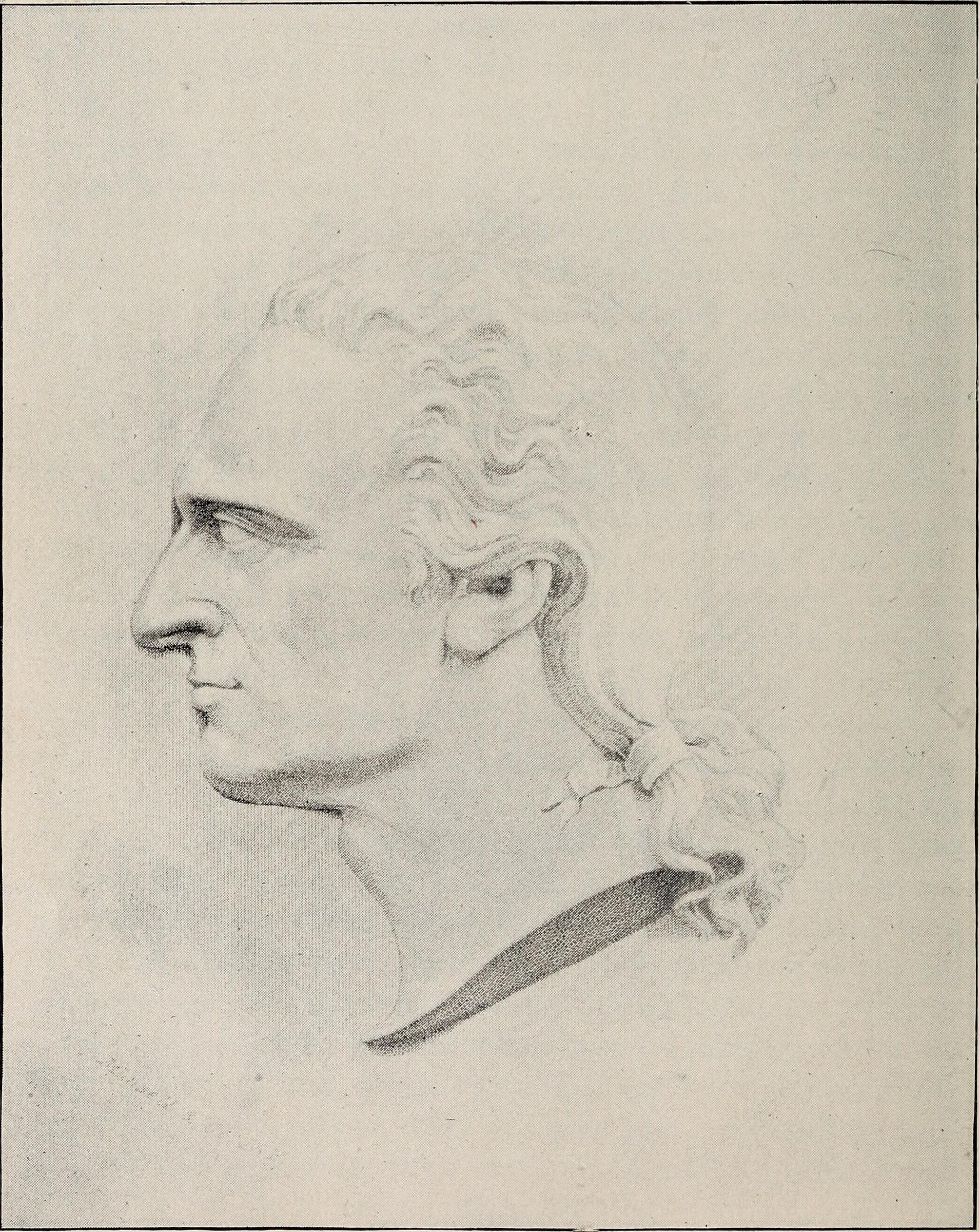
Lucas Sullivant

Lucas Sullivant (September 22, 1765 – August 8, 1823) founded the village of Franklinton in 1797 on land he had acquired as payment for surveying the Virginia Military District in 1795. Franklinton was the first permanent American settlement in what would become Franklin County and served as the county seat from 1803 until 1824, when the seat transferred to Columbus across the Scioto River. Sullivant platted the village at 220 lots and began construction of the house at the southwest corner of the settlement's main intersection.

== Construction ==
While still a bachelor and intending to court Sarah Starling of Kentucky, Sullivant sent to Philadelphia for 15,000 bricks and glass window panes, materials not available locally, to build what he intended to be the finest home in the settlement. A walnut staircase was also transported from Philadelphia at considerable expense. The completed house stood in deliberate contrast to the log cabins and simple frame structures that surrounded it; most other homes in the pioneer village had oilskin paper stretched across their windows in place of glass. Its high ceilings, polished walnut floors, and brick construction made it the most substantial dwelling in central Ohio at the time of its completion.

The original structure rose two full stories, with two rooms on each floor connected by the walnut staircase. In the years following Lucas Sullivant's death in 1823, his sons expanded the house substantially. By the time the family departed the property, the house had grown to a T-shaped plan of approximately twenty rooms, with winding staircases and numerous large fireplaces throughout. A rear veranda looked out over the landscape of the Scioto Valley.

== The Sullivant family in the house ==
In 1801, Sullivant returned to Kentucky to marry Sarah Starling and brought her to the completed house in Franklinton. The couple raised four children there: William Starling, born January 15, 1803; Michael, born August 6, 1807; Joseph, born December 3, 1809; and a daughter, Sarah Ann. Sarah Sullivant also raised an African American child named Arthur Boke in the house after his mother disappeared following childbirth; his father had been a surveying associate of Lucas Sullivant.

=== A house at the center of a settlement ===
The house served as the social and civic heart of the young settlement. Among the most striking features of the house, to visitors accustomed to frontier conditions, was the rear veranda, which offered a clear prospect across the undeveloped Scioto Valley — a view described in the Franklinton Historical Society's account of the property as breathtaking. The recreated interior at COSI, constructed from original materials salvaged before the house was demolished, featured furnishings including a piano, reflecting the family's circumstances as among the most prosperous in early central Ohio.

=== The 1813 Harrison conference ===
The most historically significant event to take place on the property occurred in 1813, when Sullivant hosted a conference between U.S. General William Henry Harrison and representatives of four Native American nations: the Shawnee, Delaware, Seneca, and Wyandot. Chief Tarhe the Crane of the Wyandot rose to shake hands with General Harrison at the meeting, and an agreement was reached that the Native peoples would support the American cause against the British. The conference is among the few documented diplomatic events of the War of 1812 to have taken place at a private residence in central Ohio.

=== Sarah Sullivant and the typhus epidemic ===
In the spring of 1814, typhus spread through the army camp established in Franklinton as a mobilization point for the War of 1812. Sarah Sullivant tended to the sick continuously until she fell ill herself. She died on April 28, 1814, at the age of 33. Their daughter Sarah Anne, less than two years of age, died a month later of the same illness. Both were buried in the Old Franklinton Cemetery on River Street. Lucas Sullivant died in the house on August 8, 1823, at the age of 57, of bilious fever during a severe epidemic that swept Franklin County that summer. Following his death, his sons maintained and expanded the house substantially, living there until the mid-1850s.

== Later occupants ==
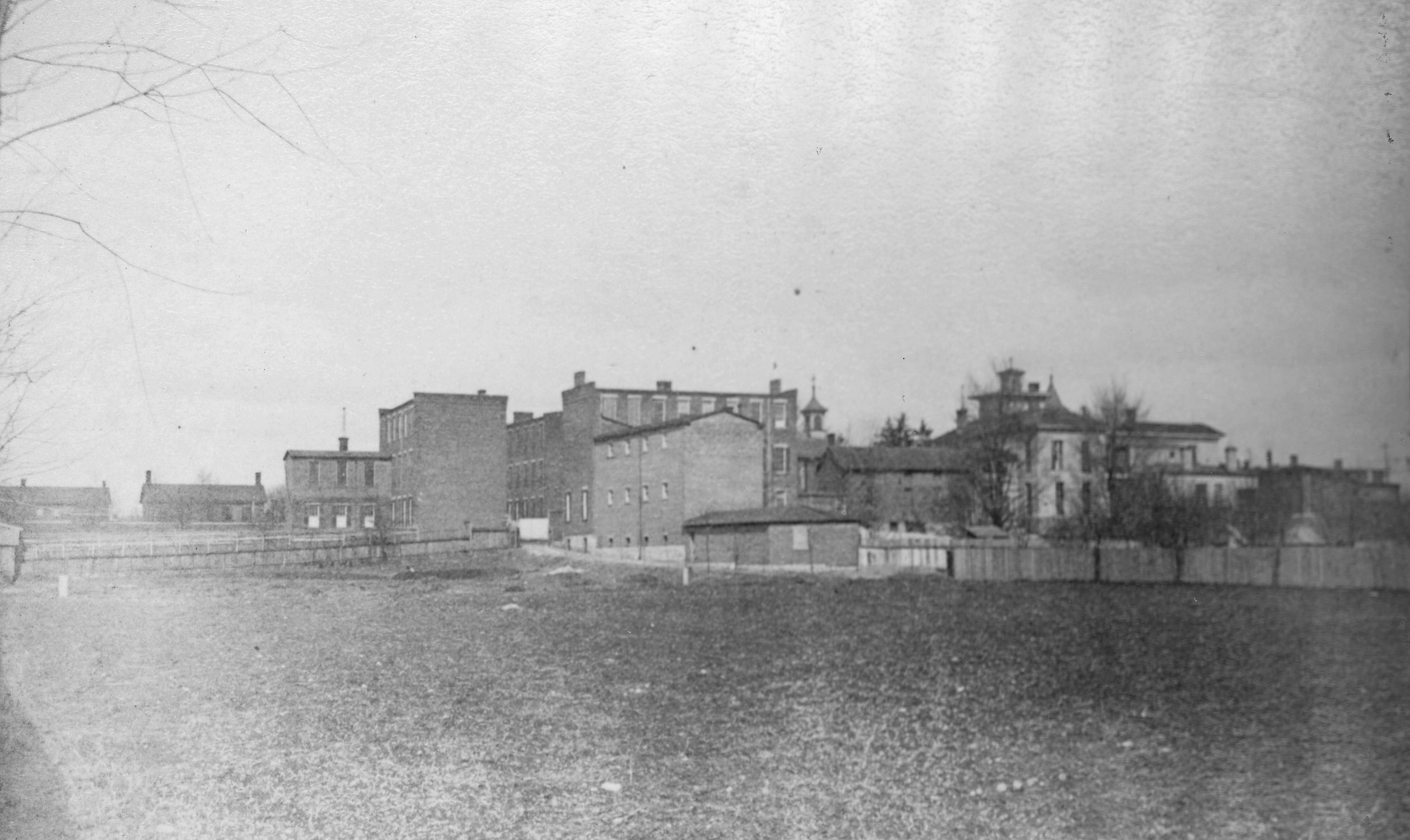
Good Shepherd Convent

After the Sullivant family departed the property in the mid-1850s, it stood unoccupied or under interim use until 1865, when the Order of Our Lady of Charity of the Good Shepherd of Angers established a presence in Columbus. Four Sisters came from Cincinnati in the spring of 1865 to temporary quarters on East Spring Street. Nine months later they moved to the former Sullivant mansion at the southwest corner of West Broad and Sandusky Streets, at the address now designated 707 West Broad Street.

The institution they operated there was known as the Good Shepherd School and opened a school and refuge for girls in 1867. Its purpose was to provide shelter and instruction for women and girls in difficult circumstances. By 1873, there were 39 penitents and 48 students in residence, all engaged in needlework, embroidery, sewing, and laundry under the direction of the Sisters. By 1893, the institution had served a total of 5,060 residents since its founding. The school was renamed St. Euphrasia School in 1946, shifting its orientation from trade training to the care of children with difficulties, and renamed again as Rosemont School in 1958. In 1964, the school relocated to a new site on Dawnlight Avenue in Columbus.

The Lucas Sullivant Memorial and the Franklinton Memorial Marker at the site were rededicated at the Convent of the Good Shepherd, West Broad and Sandusky Streets, on April 30, 1953, as part of ceremonies marking the sesquicentennial of the formation of Franklin County.

== Demolition and preservation of elements ==
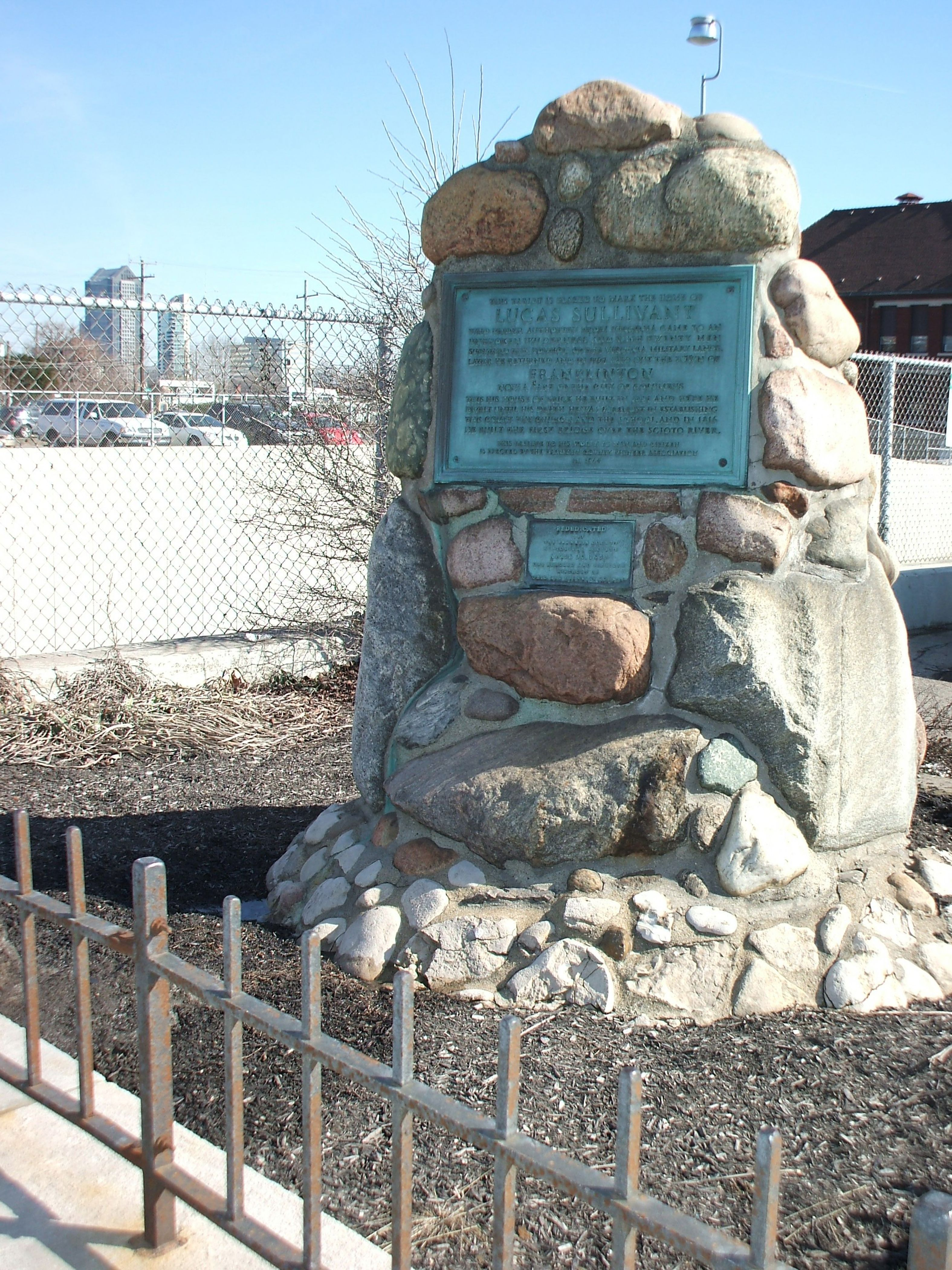
Lucas Sullivant House memorial plaque

The house was demolished on February 4, 1965, to make way for commercial development. It had survived the construction of State Route 315 through the Franklinton area, which displaced several nearby structures, before being razed for the Graham Ford automobile dealership, which opened at the site in 1971.

Before the house was demolished, its massive front door was donated to the Columbus Museum of Science and Industry (COSI) by Mrs. George T. Johnson, the great-great-granddaughter of Lucas Sullivant. The door formed the entrance to a recreated interior in the museum's Durell Street of Yesteryear exhibit, which included a room known as the Lucas Sullivant Room. Original floorboards and woodwork from the homestead were incorporated into the reconstruction, along with period furnishings including a piano consistent with the family's documented circumstances. The house's ornate cast-iron and wood balcony was incorporated into an interior wall of the Graham Ford dealership and remained visible through the front window of that building for several decades. Graham Ford closed at 707 West Broad Street in September 2008.

== The site today ==
The Graham Ford dealership building was demolished in 2018. The site at 707 West Broad Street has since remained vacant.

A bronze plaque affixed to a rock monument on West Broad Street, erected in 1927 by the Franklin County Pioneer Association and rededicated in 1953 by the Franklin County Historical Society, marked the site with the following text: "This tablet is placed to mark the home of Lucas Sullivant who under authority from Virginia came to an unbroken wilderness and with twenty men surveyed this portion of the Virginia Military Lands. Later he returned and in 1797 laid out the town of Franklinton now a part of the City of Columbus. This his house of brick he built in 1801 and here he dwelt until his death. He was foremost in establishing the court, the church and the school. And in 1816 he built the first bridge over the Scioto River."

Around early 2022, a vehicle struck and destroyed the rock monument. The bronze plaques were recovered from the debris. As of July 2023, no historical organization had accepted responsibility for the marker's upkeep. Trent Smith, executive director of the Franklinton Board of Trade, stated that he intended to pursue its restoration.

== Sources ==
- "Lucas Sullivant". Franklinton Historical Society.
- "History Lesson: Lucas Sullivant, Pioneer of Franklinton". Columbus Underground. 2012.
- "Graham Ford to close its doors in Franklinton". Columbus Underground. 2008.
- "Lost Mansions of Columbus: The Lucas Sullivant Home". Columbus Navigator.
- "Lucas Sullivant historical marker in Franklinton to be restored". Axios Columbus. 2023.
- "Franklinton Historic Buildings". All Columbus Data.
- "Lucas Sullivant Room". Old COSI.
- "Lucas Sullivant Home Site Historical Marker". Historical Marker Database.
- "Franklinton: Lucas Sullivant Home". Teaching Columbus Historic Places.
- "Good Shepherd School, Columbus" (PDF). Catholic Record Society, Diocese of Columbus. 2010.
- "Franklin County Historical Society". Ohio History Journal. 62: 273–284. 1953.
- "Lucas Sullivant: His Personality and Adventures". Ohio History Journal. 37: 177–189. 1928.
