= Union Station arch =

Historical relic in Columbus, Ohio

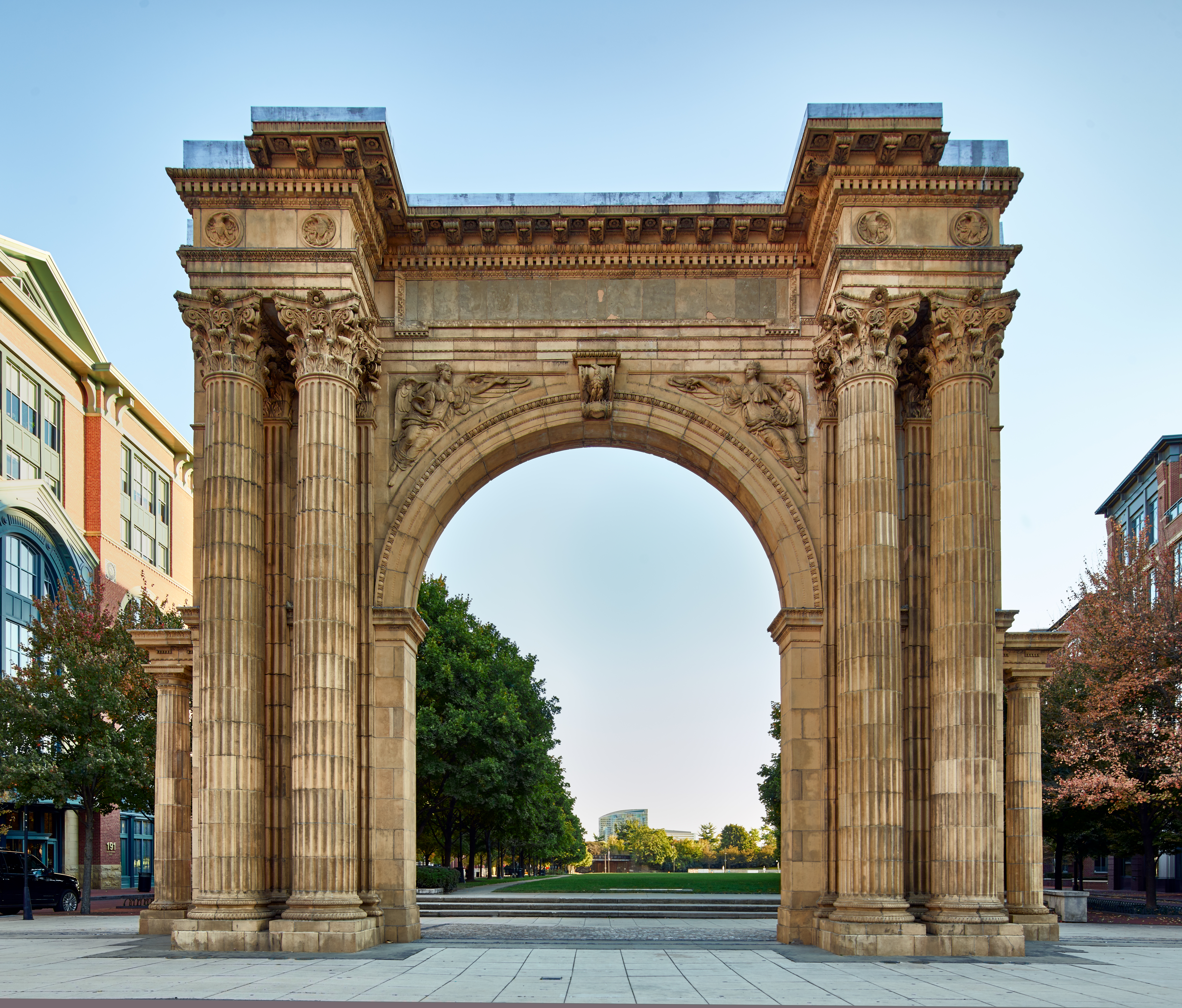
- The Union Station arch at McFerson Commons; image by Carol Highsmith
- Artist: Daniel Burnham
- Completion date: 1899
- Medium: Terracotta; Brick
- Dimensions: 11 m (35 ft)
- Weight: 4 short tons (3.6 t)
- Location: McFerson Commons, Columbus, Ohio, U.S.; 39°58′05″N 83°00′27″W

The Union Station arch is a 35 ft (11 m) Beaux-Arts arch standing at McFerson Commons Park in Columbus, Ohio. The work was designed by renowned architect Daniel Burnham, as part of a grand entranceway to the city's Union Station. It has intricate details, including Corinthian columns, multiple cornices and friezes, and statuary groups; some are currently in storage.

The arch and entrance arcade were designed in 1812 and completed by 1899. The arcade was listed on the National Register of Historic Places from 1974 to 1999. Nearly all of the arcade was demolished in 1976, and preservationists managed to save the single tall arch. It was moved to storage in 1977, and placed in a new park, Arch Park, which opened in 1980. A parking garage was built on the site, necessitating that the arch move to McFerson Commons in 1999. The arch now acts as a sculpture and an architectural and historical relic.

== Attributes ==
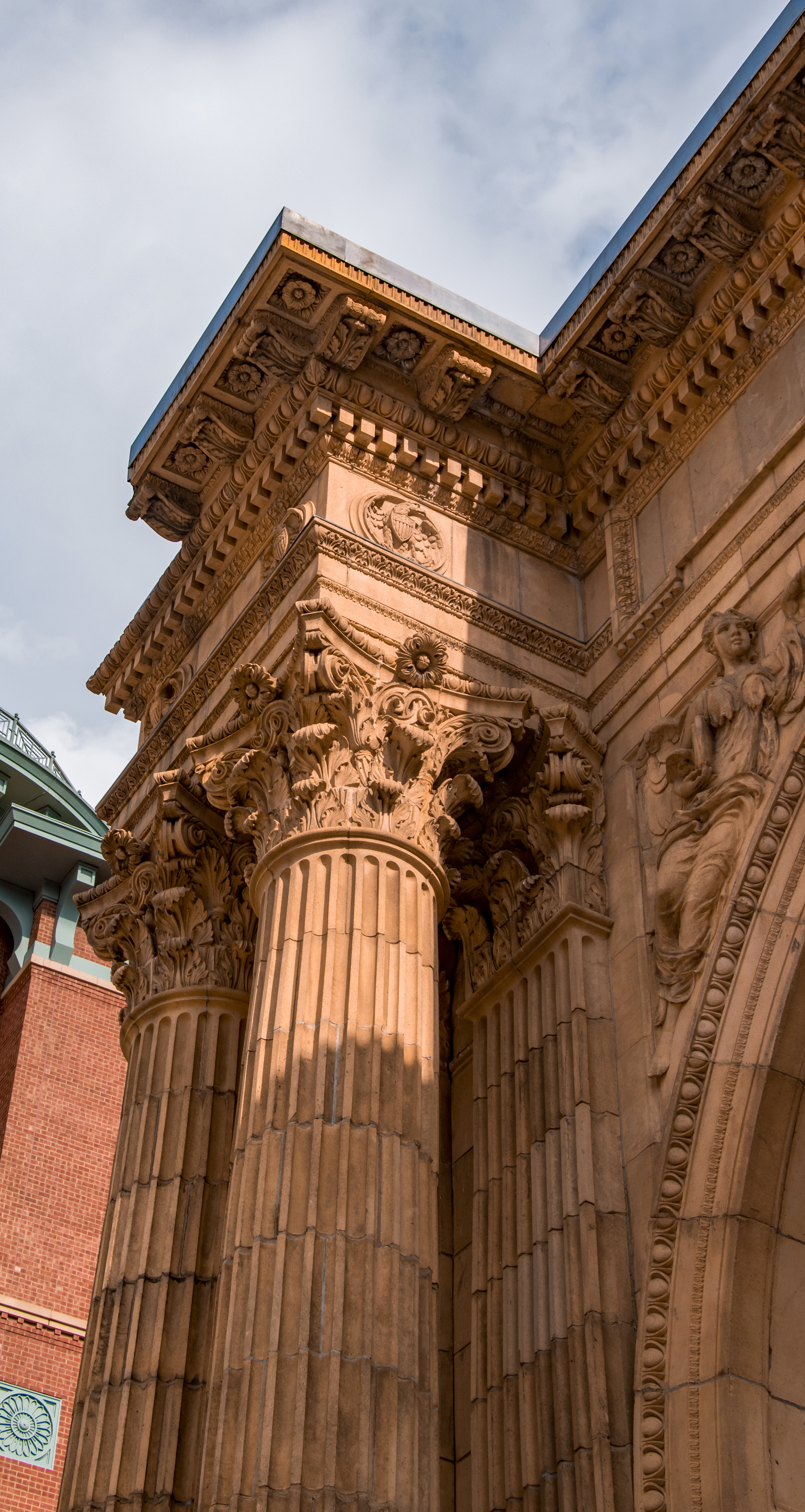
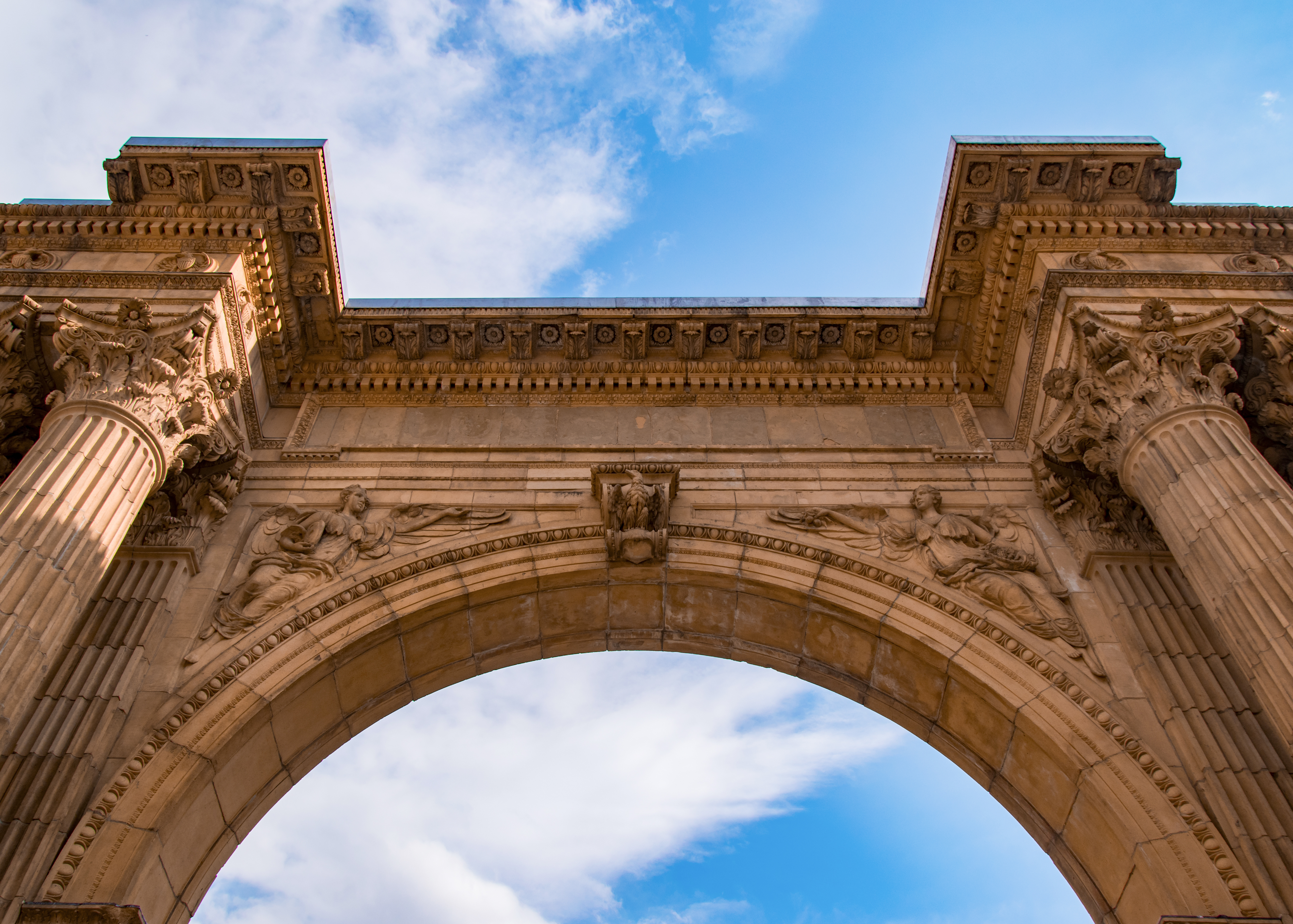
Arch ornamentation

The Union Station arch is located in McFerson Commons (sometimes known as Arch Park), where it serves as its central focal point. The site was formerly the eastern edge of the Ohio Penitentiary, which stood there from 1834 to 1997. The Beaux-Arts arch measures 35 ft (11 m) tall, and weighs about 4 short tons (3.6 t).

The structure consists of a recessed semicircular arch flanked by four fluted round Corinthian columns. An angel relief is carved into each of the arch's spandrels. Above the spandrels and columns is an architrave; above that is a frieze with decorative eagle medallions, and which once had "Union Station" inscribed in its center. A denticulated cornice is situated above it. Several elements from above the cornice are today kept in storage: a wider frieze featuring triglyphs and alternating medallions with classical busts, another denticulated cornice with gargoyles, and statue groups (once situated on pedestals above the Corinthian columns).

== History ==
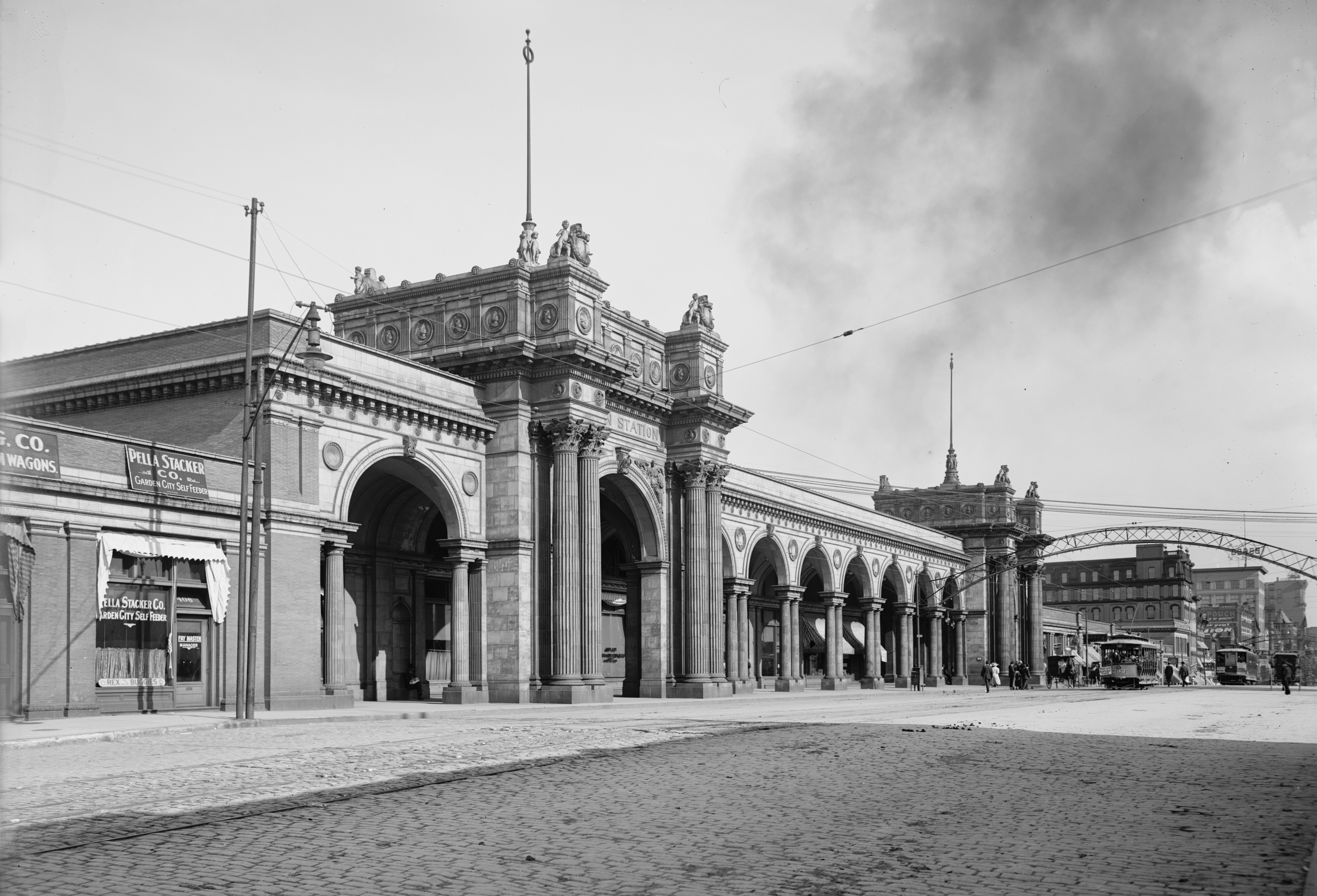
The arch (center-left) among its arcade c. 1900–1914

The arch was part of Columbus's Union Station, designed by Daniel Burnham in 1893. It was originally the northern of two identical grand archways in the elaborate High Street colonnade gateway to the station. The southern archway was demolished along with a third of the colonnade in May 1928, allowing the station entrance to be wide enough for trucks.

The train station arcade had wood lath vaulted ceilings, covered in plaster. By 1973, the plaster was crumbling, and the arches became nesting places for pigeons, while moisture was causing the wood lath to rot. Storefronts were set behind the arches, all vacant by 1973 except for a cigar store.

Amid declining rail traffic nationwide, Union Station was demolished from 1976 to 1979 to make way for the Greater Columbus Convention Center. Demolition began at 6 pm on Friday, October 22, 1976. Demolition contractors S.G. Loewendick & Sons demolished nearly the entire arcade; the arch was the only intact remnant. At 4 pm the next day, preservationists George C. Smith and Judy Kitchen contacted attorney C. William Brownfield to write a formal complaint, which Judge George Tyack signed at 5:45, and demolition was stopped by 6 pm that day. The preservationists expressed difficulty finding an available judge, as many of them were attending an Ohio State football game at the Ohio Stadium that day. One writer recalled that the attorney drove to the station promptly with the order, handing it to the demolition crew moments before the arch was to come down. The order noted that improper procedures were followed in planning its demolition. Battelle then allowed the historical society 120 days to remove the remaining remnant of the demolition, the single arch left standing; Battelle offered no funds to help preserve or move the arch. Organizers were determined to save the arch, after losing the fight to preserve the Alfred Kelley mansion several years earlier.

The arch was disassembled and moved to a site nearby in April 1977, and was reconstructed in the new landscaped "Arch Park" in October 1979; the .7-acre park opened on June 7, 1980. In March 1999, the arch moved to its current location, as the Arch Park site made way for a Nationwide Insurance parking garage. A set of decorative cherubs and medallions topped each of the ends at the top of the arch; the pieces were removed and placed in storage during the move to McFerson Commons and have not been restored atop the arch since then.

The arch has since become a symbol for the city and local organizations. The Columbus Landmarks Foundation has incorporated the arch into its logo since 2018.

== Gallery ==
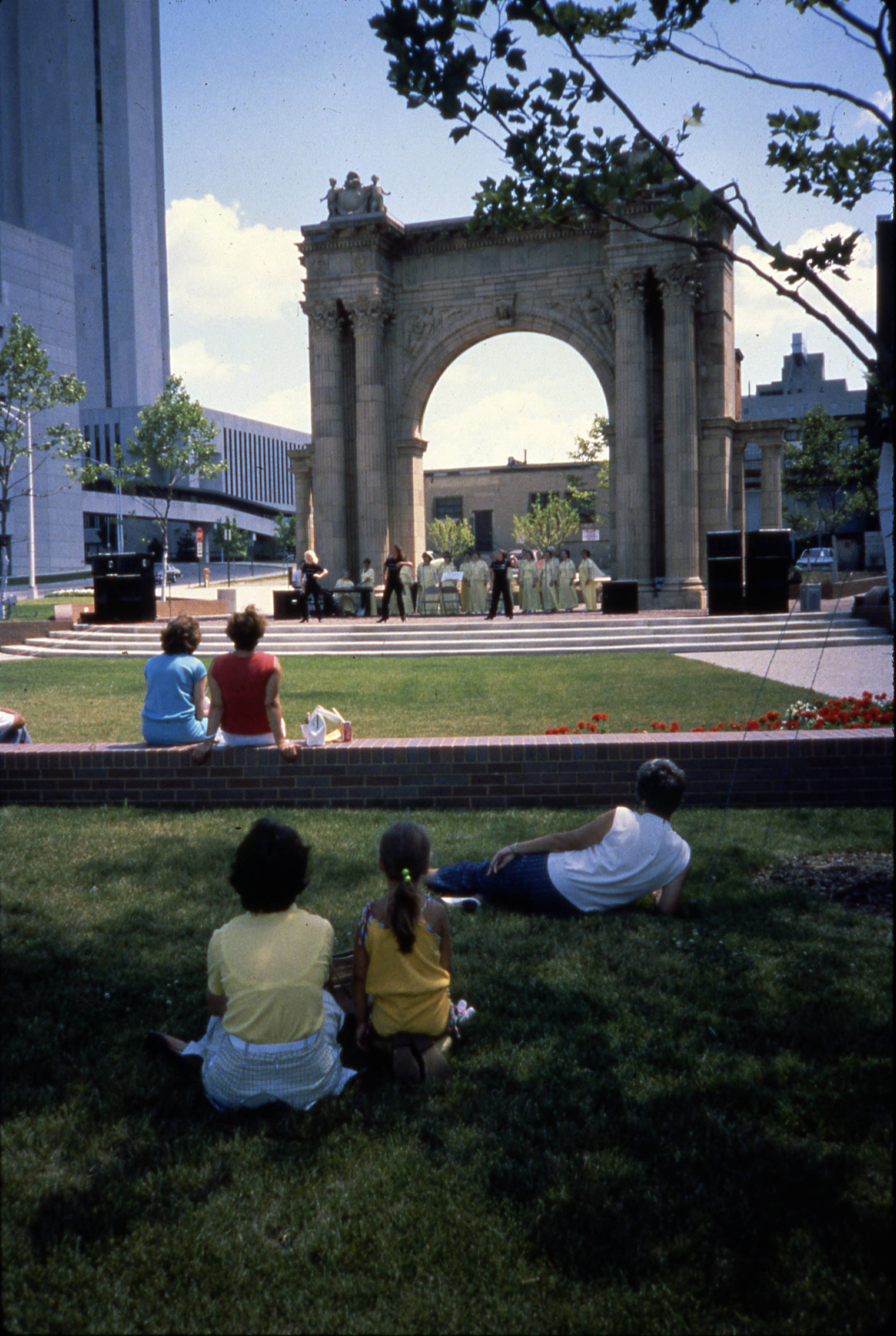
In Arch Park
(1980–1999)

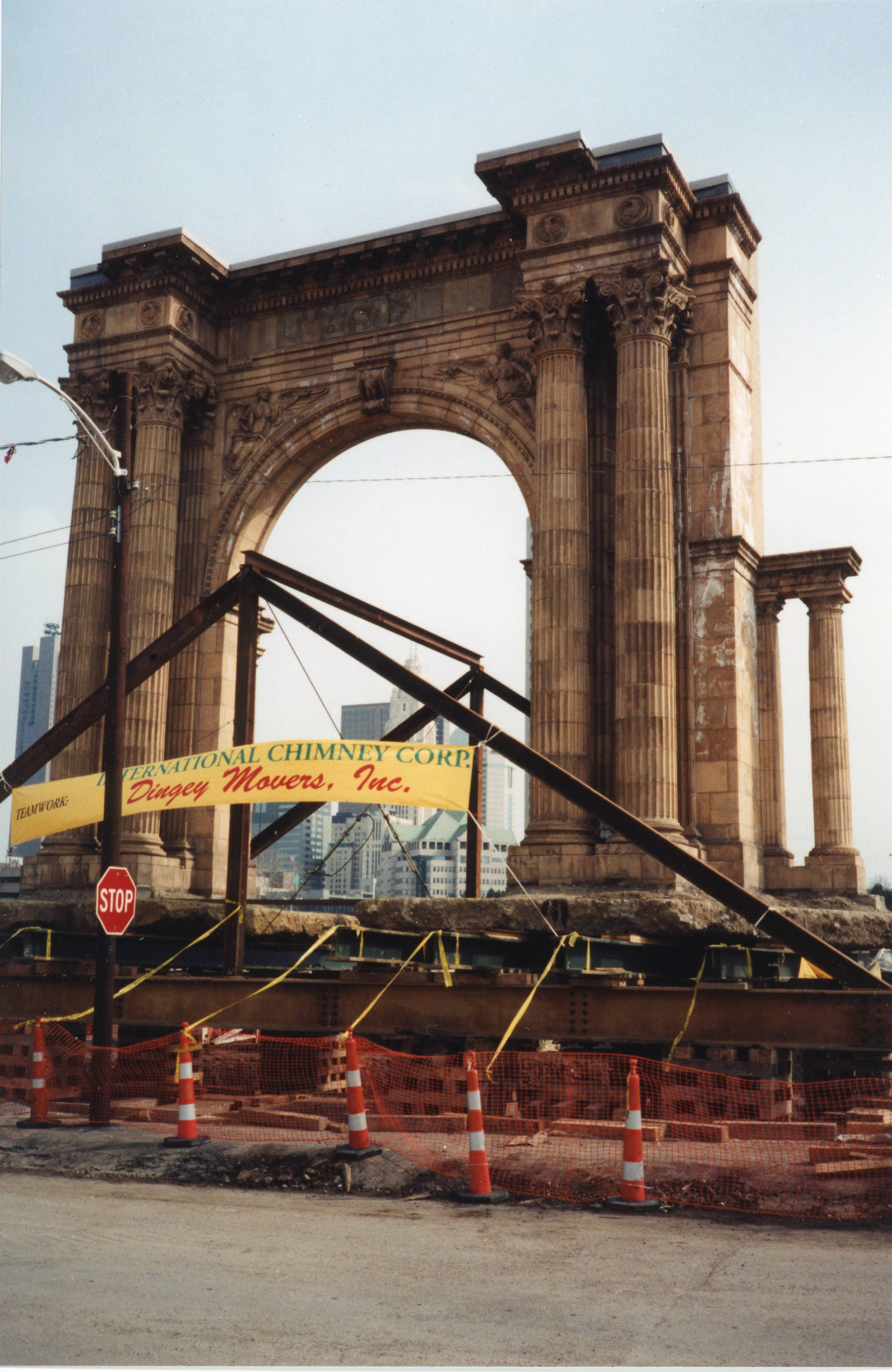
1999 move

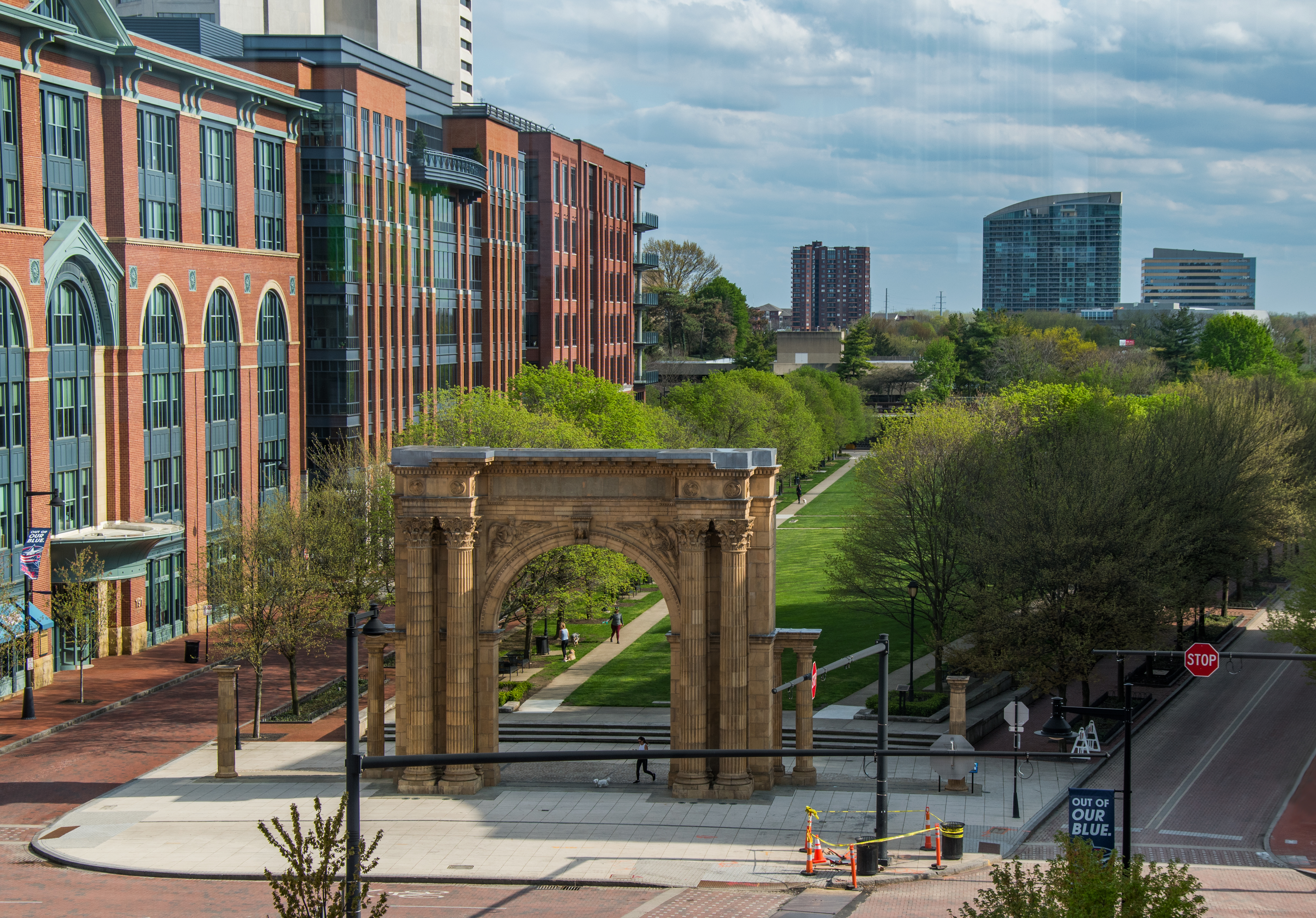
Fronting McFerson Commons

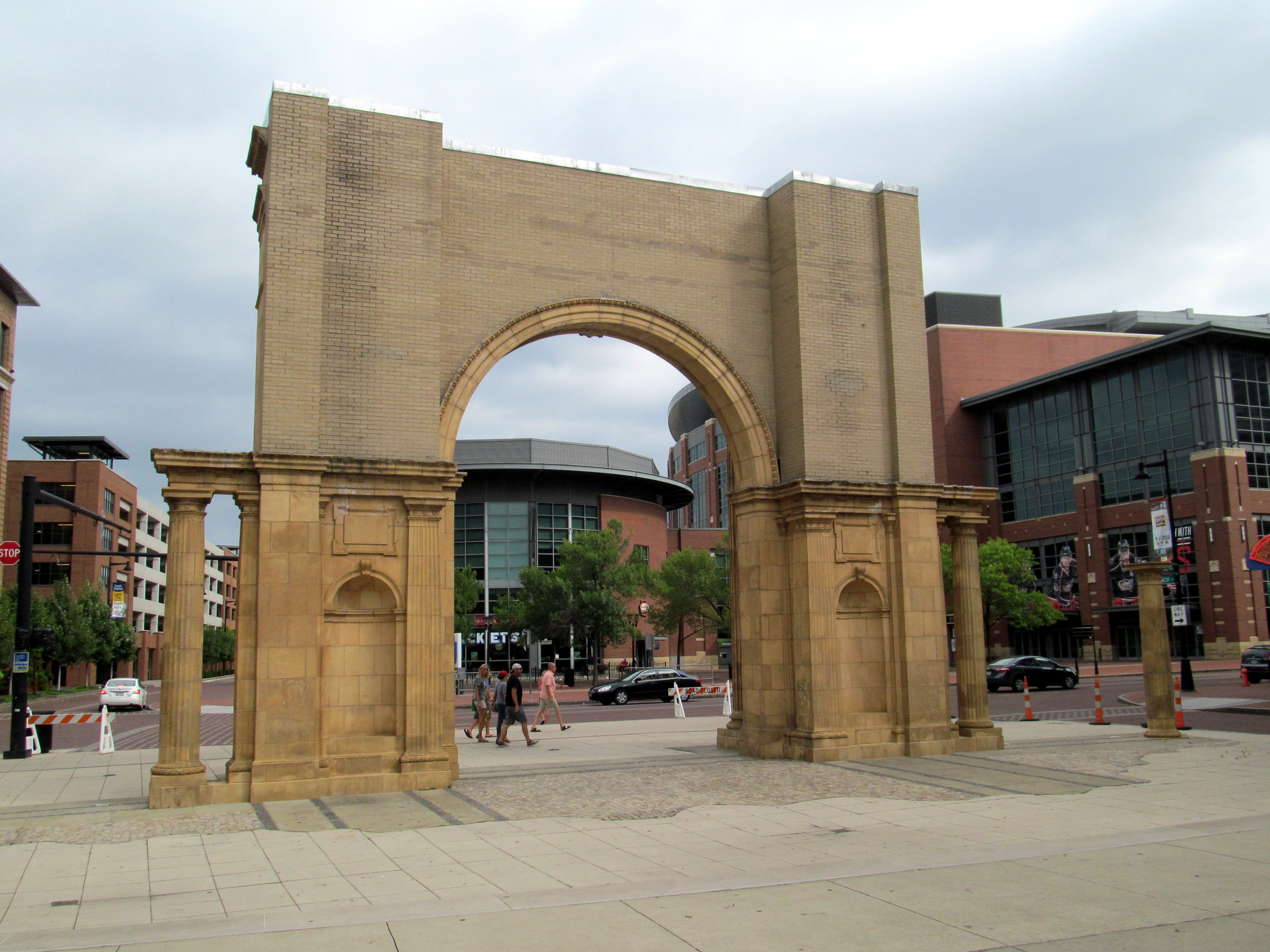
Rear

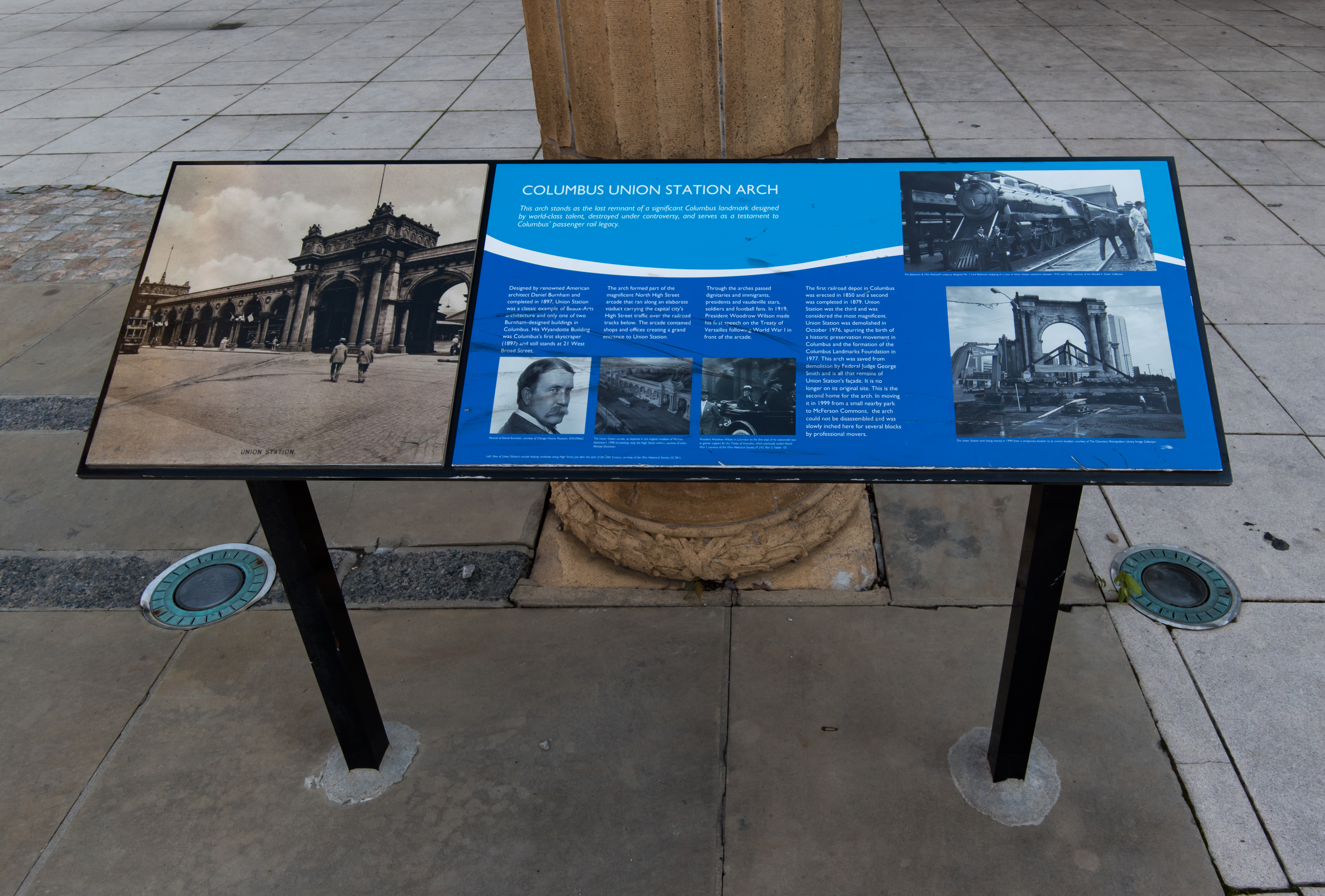
Informational plaque on-site

== See also ==
- Union Station (mural)
