= Columbus and Xenia Railroad =

Railroad in Ohio, United States

- Route of the Columbus and Xenia Railroad and the subsidiary Dayton, Xenia, and Belpre Railroad

Overview
- Headquarters: Columbus, Ohio, U.S.
- Dates of operation: February 22, 1850–December 22, 1941
- Successor: Little Miami Railroad

Technical
- Track gauge: 4 ft 10 in (1,473 mm)
- Length: 54.7 miles (88.0 km)

The Columbus and Xenia Railroad was a railroad which connected the city of Columbus with the town of Xenia in the state of Ohio in the United States. Construction began in October 1847, and the line opened in February 1850. Connecting with the Little Miami Railroad, it created the first rail route from Cincinnati to Columbus.

== Formation and fundraising ==
The Columbus and Xenia Railroad (C&X) was chartered on March 12, 1844. Among its early leaders was William Dennison, the future Governor of Ohio.

The Little Miami Railroad linked Cincinnati and Xenia in 1845, and the C&X was intended to link Columbus to Xenia—creating the first rail link between Columbus and Cincinnati. In its charter, the C&X was authorized to issue $500,000 ($16,900,000 in 2024 dollars) in stock, but the incorporators had difficulty raising funds and initiating construction. Two years later, the state authorized Greene County to purchase $50,000 ($1,700,000 in 2024 dollars) of company stock, and the town of Xenia to purchase $5,000 ($200,000 in 2024 dollars) of company stock. The following year, the state authorized Franklin County and the city of Columbus to purchase $50,000 ($1,700,000 in 2024 dollars) of company stock each. The General Assembly also amended the C&X's charter to permit it to seek loans up to $300,000 ($10,100,000 in 2024 dollars). Greene County was authorized to purchased another $50,000 ($1,700,000 in 2024 dollars) in stock, and Xenia to purchase another $6,000 ($200,000 in 2024 dollars) in stock. Madison County was authorized to purchase up to $20,000 ($700,000 in 2024 dollars) in stock.

By April 1845, the company had raised just $200,000 ($6,700,000 in 2024 dollars). With funds still in short supply, no survey of the route had been made by February 1847. The state legislature amended the company's charter in February 1848 to permit it to increase the stock by $1 million and to obtain loans in any amount necessary to complete the road.

== Construction ==
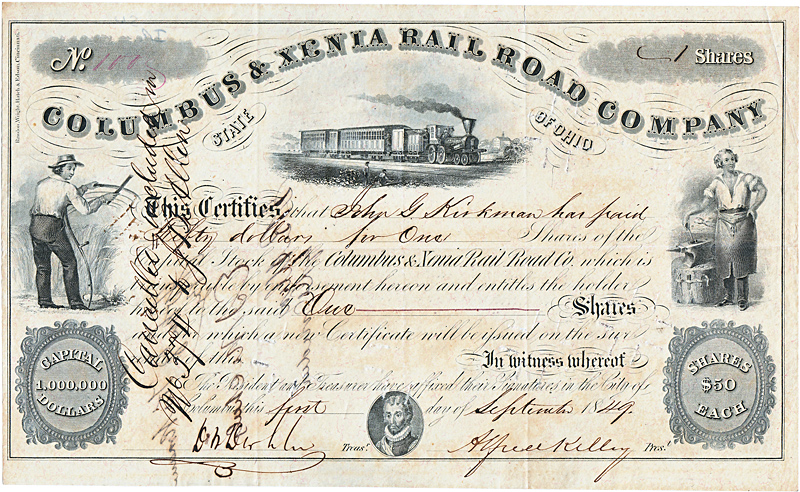
Share of the Columbus and Xenia Railroad Company issued September 1, 1849

=== Selecting the route ===
The C&X now had enough funds to begin construction of the line, but not enough to complete it. The company was now faced with selecting a president who not only had to be an able fund-raiser but who also could oversee construction of the line without incurring any cost overruns. Alfred Kelley agreed to become president of the railroad in spring or summer of 1847 at a salary of $500 ($16,873 in 2024 dollars) a year. Kelley, a Cleveland lawyer, had been elected the first mayor of the newly-incorporated Village of Cleveland in 1815. As a member of the Ohio General Assembly, he championed the construction of canals, and as a Canal Commissioner oversaw the construction of the Ohio and Erie Canal. Known as the "father of the Ohio and Erie Canal", Kelley was one of the most dominant commercial, financial, and political people in the state of Ohio in the first half of the 1800s.

One of the ablest bankers and financiers in Ohio, Kelley personally went to New York City to sell C&X bonds, and raised enough money to not only complete construction of the railroad but also to buy locomotives and rolling stock to equip it. Kelley had accompanied the surveyors when they located the route of the Ohio & Erie Canal, and now he and engineer Sylvester Medbery traveled along the likely routes surveying them together. Kelley personally approved the route of the C&X.

=== Grading and tracking the line ===
Construction on the C&X began when contracts were issued in October 1847 for grading of the line from the west bank of Scioto River in Columbus west to Georgesville. The 13 miles (21 km) west of Georgesville went under grading contract in September 1848, and the last 15 miles (24 km) to Xenia were under contract two months later. Grading was expected to be complete by February 1, 1849.

Work constructing the track bed began in February 1849. This would allow the line to open in October 1849. The track bed was finished in mid-June, and railroad officials hoped to have the line to open in October. Because bridging the Scioto River would take time, the C&X began construction in July 1849 of a temporary depot on the west bank of the river in the Franklinton neighborhood of Columbus. This was a two-story brick structure 161 feet (49 m) long and 39 feet (12 m) deep.

For the actual track, Kelley contracted with Sir John Guest & Co. of Wales in the United Kingdom for T rails. The C&X was one of the first railroads in Ohio to use T rails instead of strap rails. The 200 short tons (180 t) of rails did not arrive in Cleveland until July 1849, delaying the laying of track until the fall.

=== Opening the road ===
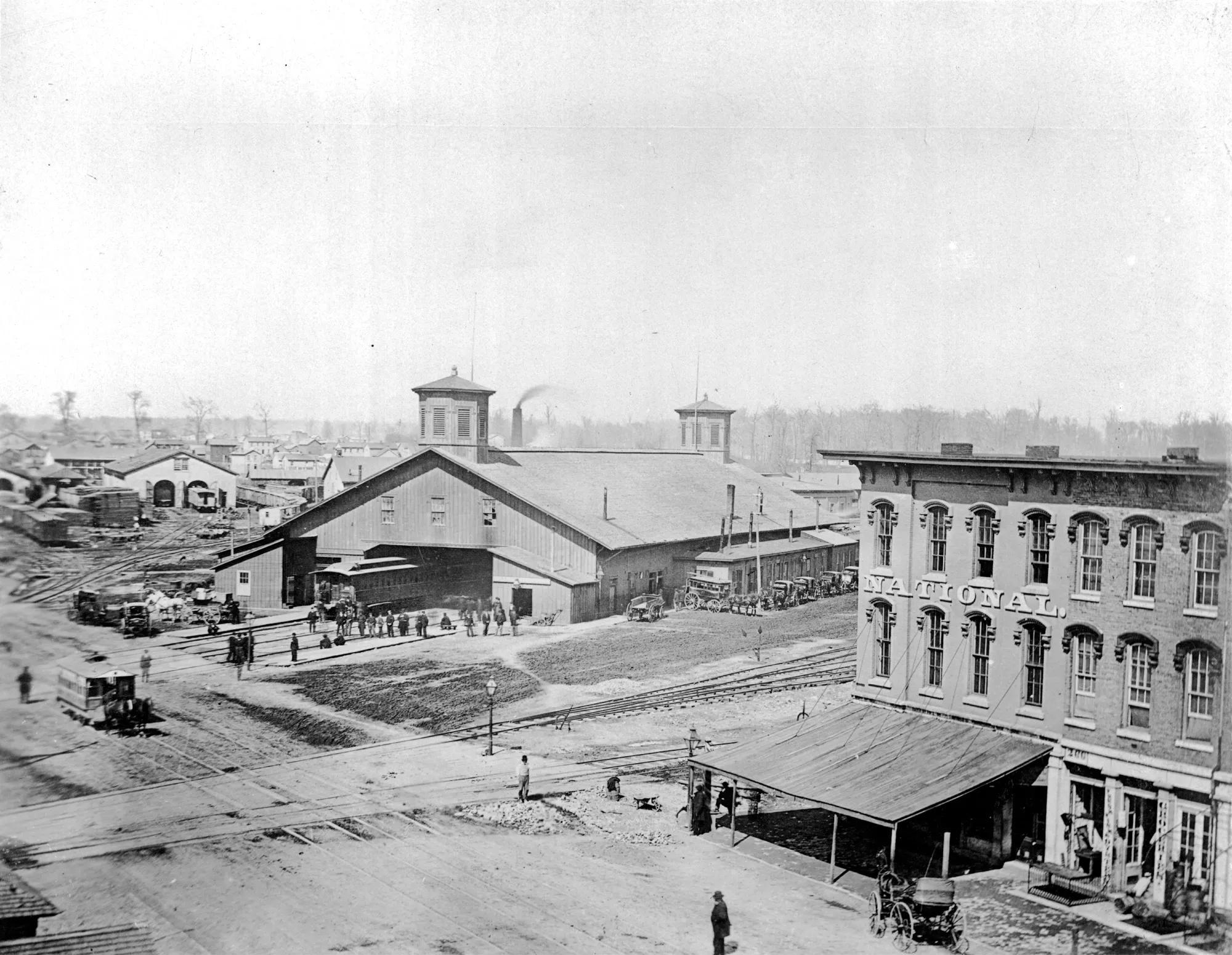
Station of the Columbus & Xenia Railroad (center, with cupola) on High Street, depicted in 1864

A locomotive was shipped via canal and rail to Columbus, where it assisted with the laying of track. Mild winter weather allowed track to be laid more quickly than expected. With only 4 to 5 miles (6.4 to 8.0 km) of track left to lay on February 9, 1850, the company rushed to write rules and regulations for operating its road and to hire conductors and track workers.

Tracklaying was complete on either February 19 or February 21, 1850. The first test train ran over the track on February 22. Passengers, which included railway officials, civic leaders, and businessmen, traveled while seated on a flatcar. The journey took 3 hours and 5 minutes.

The Columbus and Xenia Railroad began regular service on February 27, 1850. The train was pulled by the Washington, a locomotive built by the Bolton Works of Cincinnati. There were no passenger or freight stations between Columbus and Xenia, only halts. The halts were incomplete; there were no platforms, shelters, or signals, just wide mudflats. On March 2, members of the Ohio General Assembly rode the line in a special train to celebrate the road's opening.

Although the cost of constructing the road had been estimated at $600,000 ($22,700,000 in 2024 dollars) in May 1849, the final cost proved to be $1.4 million ($52,900,000 in 2024 dollars).

The C&X bridge over the Scioto River opened on December 14, 1850. This allowed the railroad to reach its permanent freight and passenger station, located on High Street at Naughten. This large, barn-like structure covered three tracks, all of them at-grade. The location of the station had been controversial, as both sides of the river wanted the station. The 1851 station had several small additions made to it in the early 1860s, to accommodate train traffic during the American Civil War. A new Union Station was built north of it in 1875, and the 1851 station demolished.

The C&X built a brick building on west side of High Street (across the street from the depot) as its corporate headquarters in 1853.

== Expansion and merger ==
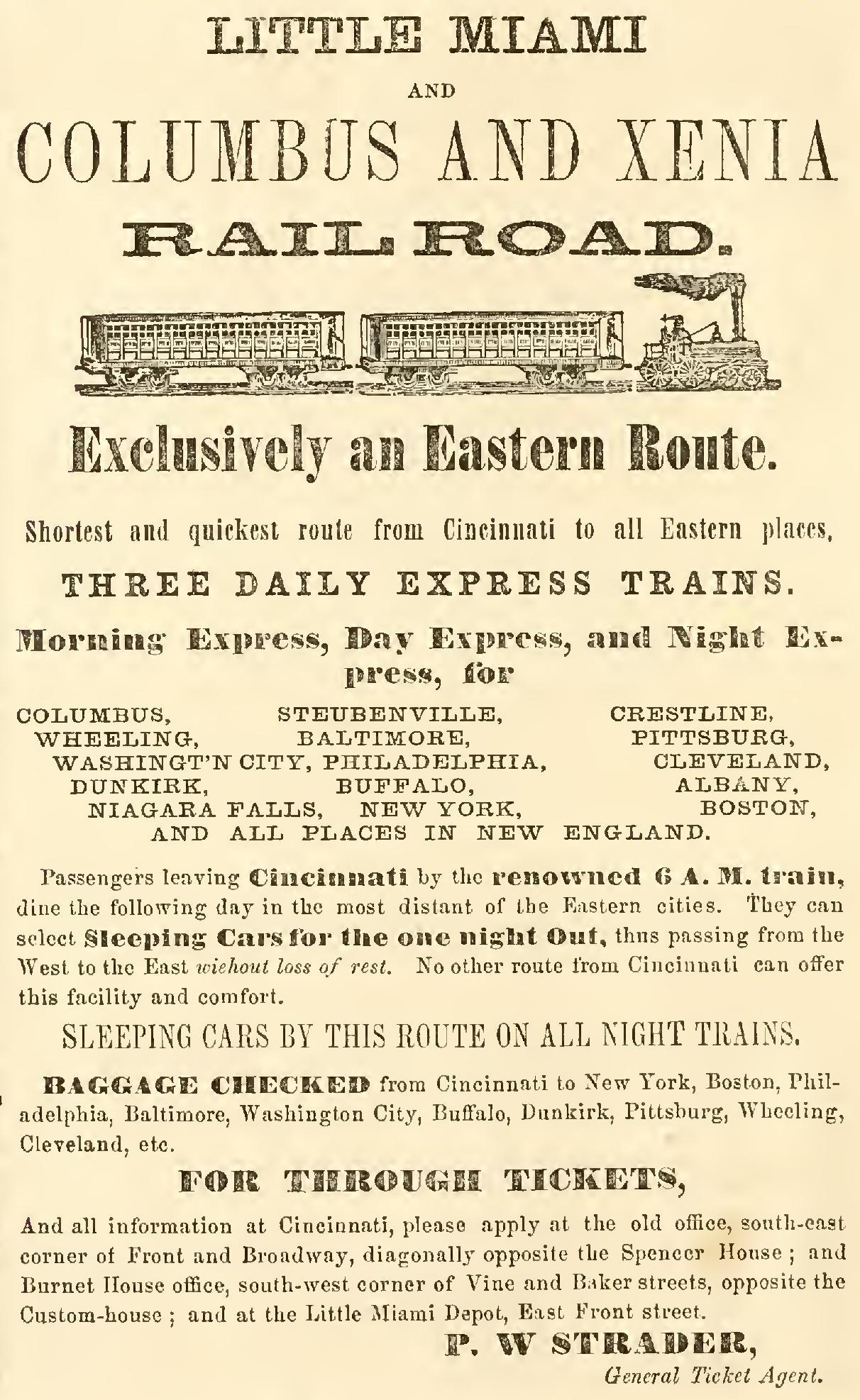
"Little Miami and Columbus and Xenia Railroad" 1865 ad in Polk's Nashville City Directory

In 1853, the Columbus and Xenia Railroad and the Little Miami Railroad entered into a contract to operate as one line. This joint operating agreement ended in 1869, at which point the C&X agreed to permanently lease itself to the Little Miami Railroad. A year later, the Little Miami (and its leased lines) were leased to the Pittsburgh, Cincinnati, Chicago and St. Louis Railroad, which eventually became a part of the Pennsylvania Railroad.

== Bibliography ==
- Bates, James L. (1888). Alfred Kelley: His Life and Work. Columbus, Ohio: Press of R. Clarke & Co.
- Camp, Mark J. (2008). Railroad Depots of Central Ohio. Charleston, S.C.: Arcadia Press. ISBN 9780738561745.
- Churella, Albert J. (2013). The Pennsylvania Railroad. Volume 1: Building an Empire, 1846-1917. Philadelphia: University of Pennsylvania Press. ISBN 9780812243482.
- Cole, Chester (2001). A Fragile Capital: Identity and the Early Years of Columbus, Ohio. Columbus, Ohio: Ohio State University Press. ISBN 9780814208533.
- Havighurst, Walter (1977). Ohio: A Bicentennial History. New York: Norton. ISBN 9780393056136.
- Hooper, Osman Castle (1920). History of the City of Columbus, Ohio, From the Founding of Franklinton in 1797, Through the World War Period to the Year 1920. Columbus, Ohio: Memorial Publishing Co.
- Lee, Alfred E. (1892). History of the City of Columbus, Capital of Ohio. Volume 1. New York: Munsell & Co.
- Marvin, Walter Rumsey (July 1954). "Ohio's Unsung Penitentiary Railroad". Ohio State Archaeological and Historical Quarterly: 254–269.
- Myers, John; Cetina, Judith G. (2015). Irish Cleveland. Charleston, S.C.: Arcadia Publishing. ISBN 9781467113496.
- Ohio Commissioner of Railroads and Telegraphs (1888). Annual Report of the Commissioner of Railroads and Telegraphs, to the Governor of the State Ohio, for the Year 1887. Columbus, Ohio: The Westbote Company, State Printers.
- Ohio Commissioner of Railroads and Telegraphs (1906). The Thirty-Eighth Annual Report of the Commissioner of Railroads and Telegraphs, to the Governor of the State Ohio, for the Year 1905. Columbus, Ohio: The Springfield Publishing Company, State Printers.
- Scheiber, Harry N. (Autumn 1978). "Alfred Kelley and the Ohio Business Elite, 1822-1859". Ohio History: 354–392.
- Schwieterman, Joseph P. (2001). When the Railroad Leaves Town: American Communities in the Age of Rail Line Abandonment. Kirksville, Mo.: Truman State University Press. ISBN 9780943549989.

== For further reading ==
- Steiner, Rowlee. A Review of Columbus Railroads. unpublished manuscript. 1952. (Available from the library of the Ohio Historical Society)
