= Union Station (Columbus, Ohio) =

Former railway station in Ohio, United States

Columbus Union Station
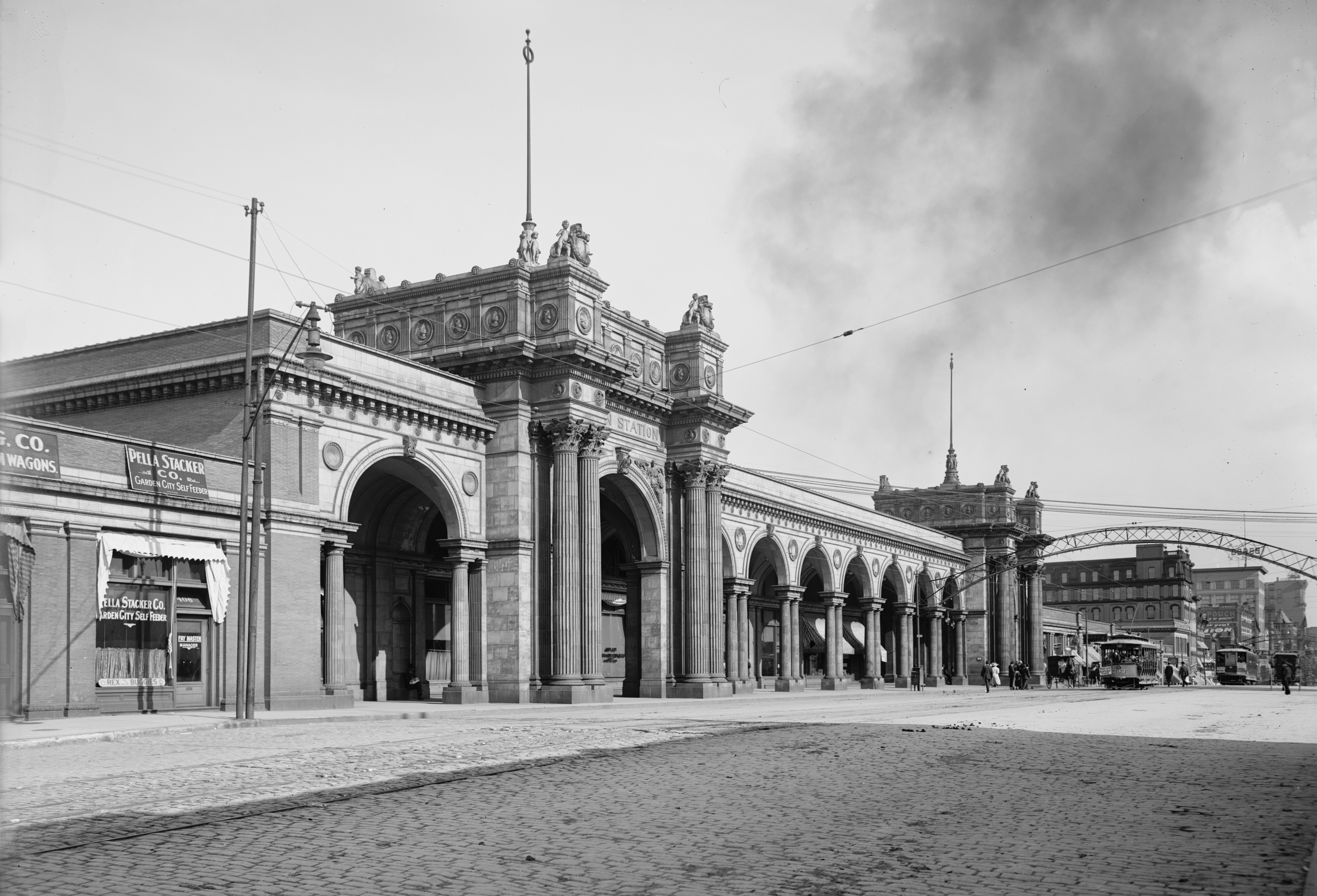
- The third Union Station's arcade in the early 20th century

General information
- Location: 370-400 N. High Street, Columbus, Ohio
- Owner: City of Columbus

History
- Opened: 1851
- Closed: 28 April 1977
- Rebuilt: 1875, 1897

Key dates
- Demolished: October 1976 to September 1979

Former services
Preceding station	Amtrak	Following station
Dayton toward Kansas City	National Limited	Pittsburgh toward New York or Washington, D.C.
Preceding station	Baltimore and Ohio Railroad	Following station
Briggsdale toward Cincinnati	Cincinnati – Pittsburgh	East Columbus toward Pittsburgh
Preceding station	Chesapeake and Ohio Railway	Following station
Linworth toward Toledo	Hocking Valley Railway; Main Line	South Columbus toward Athens
Preceding station	New York Central Railroad	Following station
Galloway toward Cincinnati	Cincinnati – Cleveland	Worthington toward Cleveland
Marysville toward Toledo	Toledo – Charleston	South Columbus toward Charleston
Preceding station	Norfolk and Western Railway	Following station
Valley Crossing toward Portsmouth	Portsmouth – Columbus	Terminus
Preceding station	Pennsylvania Railroad	Following station
West Jefferson toward Cincinnati	Cincinnati – Cleveland	Westerville toward Cleveland
Marble Cliff toward St. Louis	St. Louis – Pittsburgh	Black Lick toward Pittsburgh
Marble Cliff toward Chicago	Chicago – Columbus	Terminus
Terminus	Sandusky Branch	Worthington toward Sandusky
- Interactive map
- Location of the now-demolished station
- 39°58′15″N 83°00′04″W

Site notes
- Area: 27 acres (11 ha)
- Architect: Daniel H. Burnham & Company
- Architectural style: Beaux-Arts

U.S. National Register of Historic Places
- Designated: January 17, 1974
- Delisted: 1999
- Reference no.: 74002344
Location

Columbus Union Station was an intercity train station in Downtown Columbus, Ohio, near The Short North neighborhood. The station and its predecessors served railroad passengers in Columbus from 1851 until April 28, 1977.

The first station building was the first union station in the world, built in 1851. Its replacement was built from 1873 to 1875, just before demolition of the first station building. After traffic problems on High Street, as well as increased rail traffic became problematic, a new station was planned by Daniel Burnham beginning in 1893. The new station opened in 1897, and its arcade along High Street was finished in 1899. By 1928, part of the arcade was demolished. Passenger service significantly declined from the 1950s to the 1970s. The arcade was demolished in 1976 to make way for a new convention center, although it had been placed on the National Register of Historic Places two years prior. Train service stopped at Union Station in 1977, and the remaining portions of the station were demolished in 1979. The demolished arcade was delisted in 1999. A portion of the arcade was saved, the Union Station arch, which is the focal point of the McFerson Commons park in the nearby Arena District.

== Services ==
The first station initially was operated by the Columbus and Xenia Railroad (C&X) and Cleveland, Columbus and Cincinnati Railroad (CC&C), with the Central Ohio Railroad and Columbus, Piqua and Indiana Railroads joining in 1853. In 1864, the Steubenville and Indiana Railroad also began operating at the station.

Major trains in the 1940s included:

- Baltimore and Ohio
  - No.#33/38, #35/36 - (Cincinnati - Pittsburgh)
- Chesapeake and Ohio
  - Sportsman (Detroit - Washington, D.C. and Newport News, Virginia)
- New York Central
  - Cincinnati Mercury (Cincinnati - Cleveland)
  - Cleveland Special / Cincinnati Special (Cincinnati - Cleveland)
  - Midnight Special (Cincinnati - Cleveland)
  - Ohio State Limited (Cincinnati - New York City)
  - Southwestern Limited (St. Louis - New York City)
- Norfolk and Western
  - branch of Pocahontas from Portsmouth, Ohio, eastern destination: Norfolk, Virginia)
- Pennsylvania Railroad
  - American (St. Louis - New York City)
  - Indianapolis Limited (Indianapolis - New York City)
  - Penn Texas (St. Louis - New York City)
  - Spirit of St. Louis (St. Louis - New York City)
  - St. Louisan (St. Louis - New York City)

== Station attributes ==
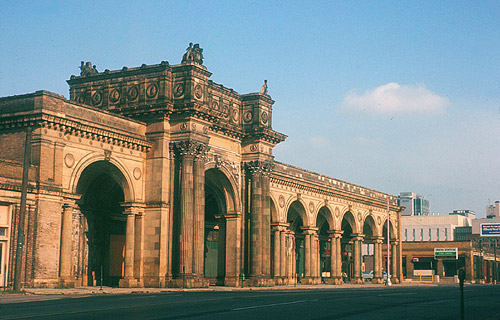
The third Union Station's arcade, June 1970

Union Station was designed by Daniel Burnham. He was noted at the time as one of the primary architects of the World's Columbian Exposition, which utilized Beaux-Arts designs to resemble a prototype for an ideal city, ushering in the City Beautiful movement.

Burnham's use of the style lead to an ornate station, held in awe by Columbus citizens for many years, though by the time of its deterioration in the 1970s, it was largely overlooked.

=== Archway ornamentation ===
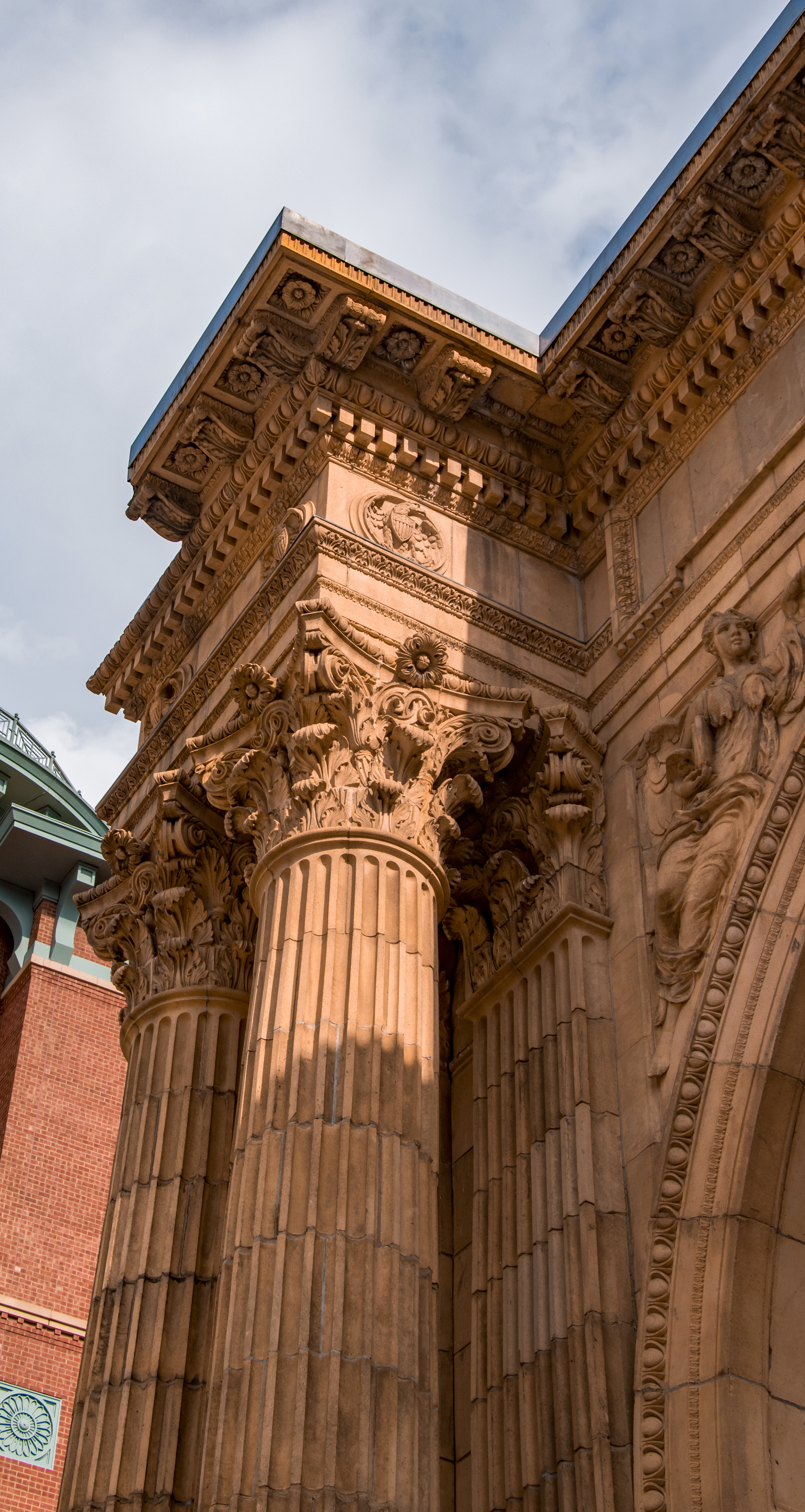
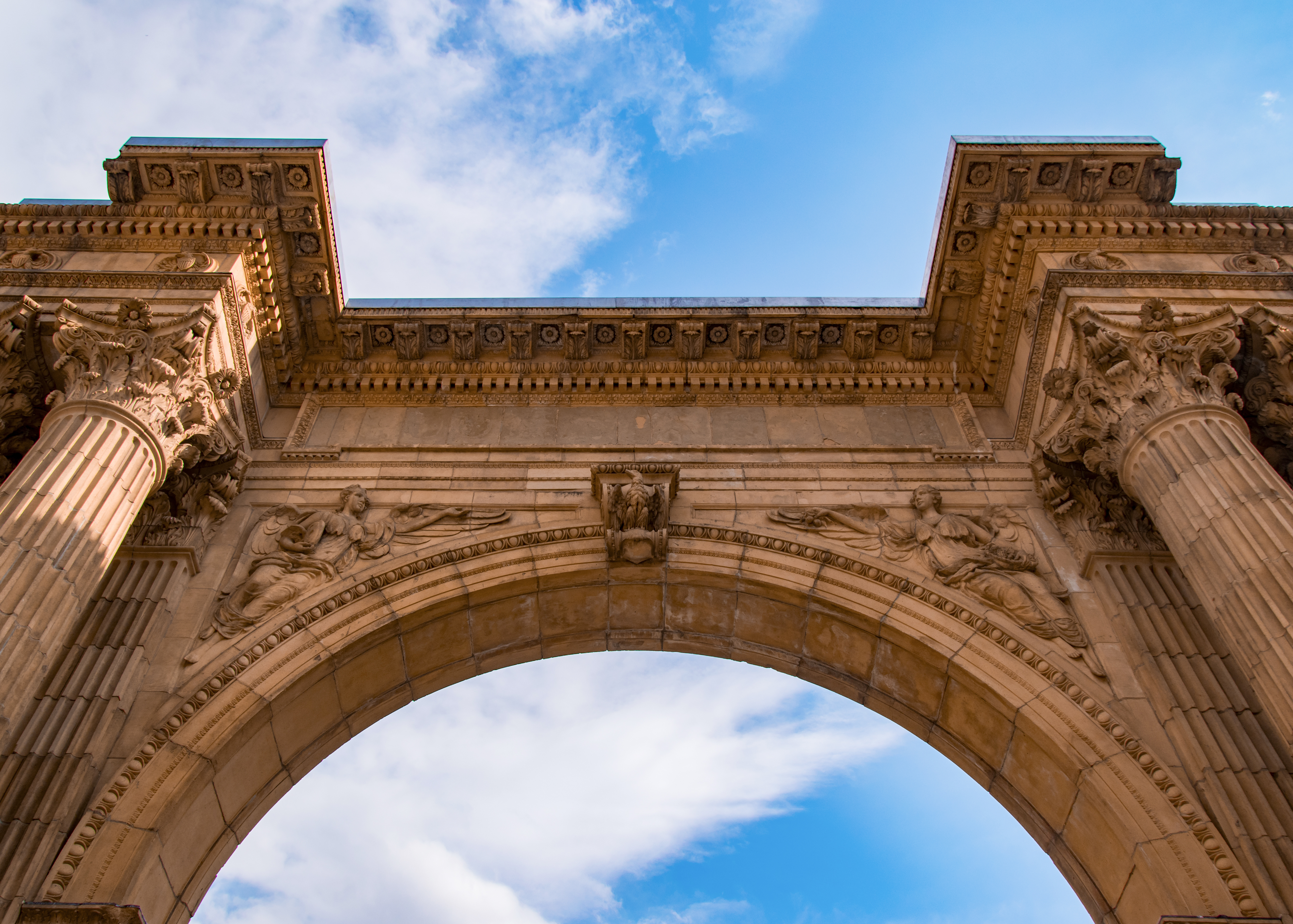
Ornamentation of the remaining northern arch

The two main arched entranceways consisted of recessed semicircular arches, each flanked by four fluted round Corinthian columns. Two angel reliefs were carved into each of the arches' extrados. The arches had friezes, with decorative eagle medallions. Above this was a denticulated cornice, and above that, a wider frieze with triglyphs and alternating medallions with classical busts. Above that was another denticulated cornice with gargoyles. The pedestals above the Corinthian columns featured statue groups.

The arcade's smaller arches were supported at the spring line by fluted Doric columns. The arches had similar motifs, but were only reached to the base of the larger arches' friezes.

Each of the arches had wood lath vaulted ceilings, covered in plaster. By 1973, the plaster was crumbling, and the arches became nesting places for pigeons, while moisture was causing the wood lath to rot. Storefronts were set behind the arches, all vacant by 1973 except a cigar store.

== History ==
Columbus Union Station, as it is recalled today, was the third Union Station in Columbus. The previous two served in the nineteenth century, and their replacement and upgrade reflected the rapid growth in traffic and importance of Columbus' railroads at that time. The subsequent decline in rail passenger traffic following World War II was reflected in Union Station's demolition and replacement with a convention center in the early 1980s.

=== First station (1851) ===
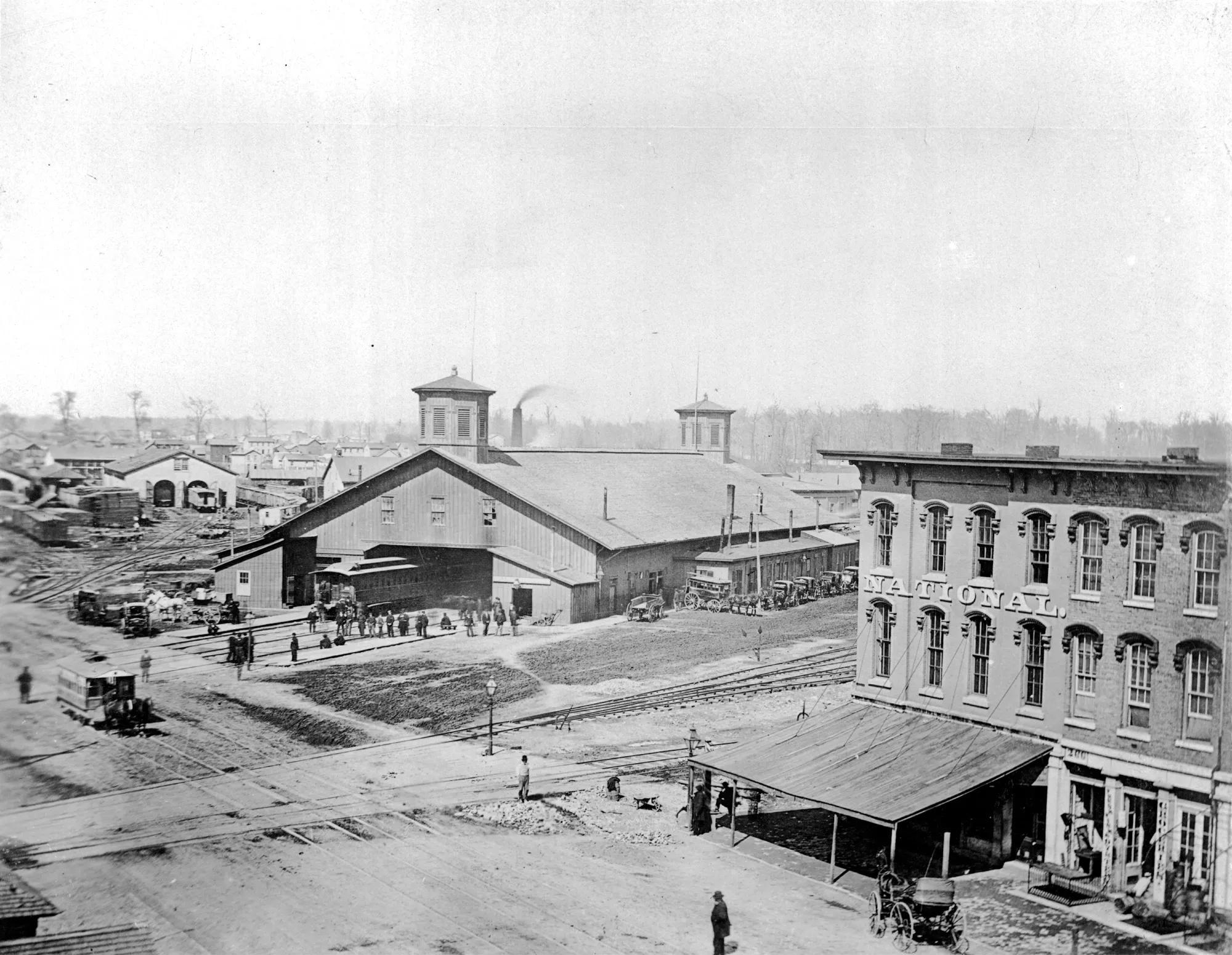
The first Columbus Union Station in 1864. The station is located here on the east side of High Street with the tracks crossing High Street.

In 1851, a site north of Naughten Street and east of High Street was purchased jointly from Orange Johnson by the Columbus and Xenia Railroad (C&X) and Cleveland, Columbus and Cincinnati Railroad (CC&C). A wood barn structure measuring 90 by 175 feet (27 by 53 m) was installed to serve passengers, the rest of the site given over to shops and freight tracks. The station had three tracks for loading and unloading of passengers. This station was the first union station in the world, housing multiple railroad companies, although the first Indianapolis Union Station was being planned, and involved more railroad cooperation than the Columbus station had, and a more equal ownership stake.

In 1853, the Central Ohio and Columbus, Piqua and Indiana Railroads entered the city and connected to the station. In 1864, the Steubenville and Indiana Railroad was connected the Central Ohio at Newark, and entered the station on shared tracks. This road was called the "panhandle route" because it crossed the panhandle of West Virginia on its way east. The station was inadequate and in 1868 the railroads formed the Union Depot Company to undertake a replacement.

=== The second station (1875) ===
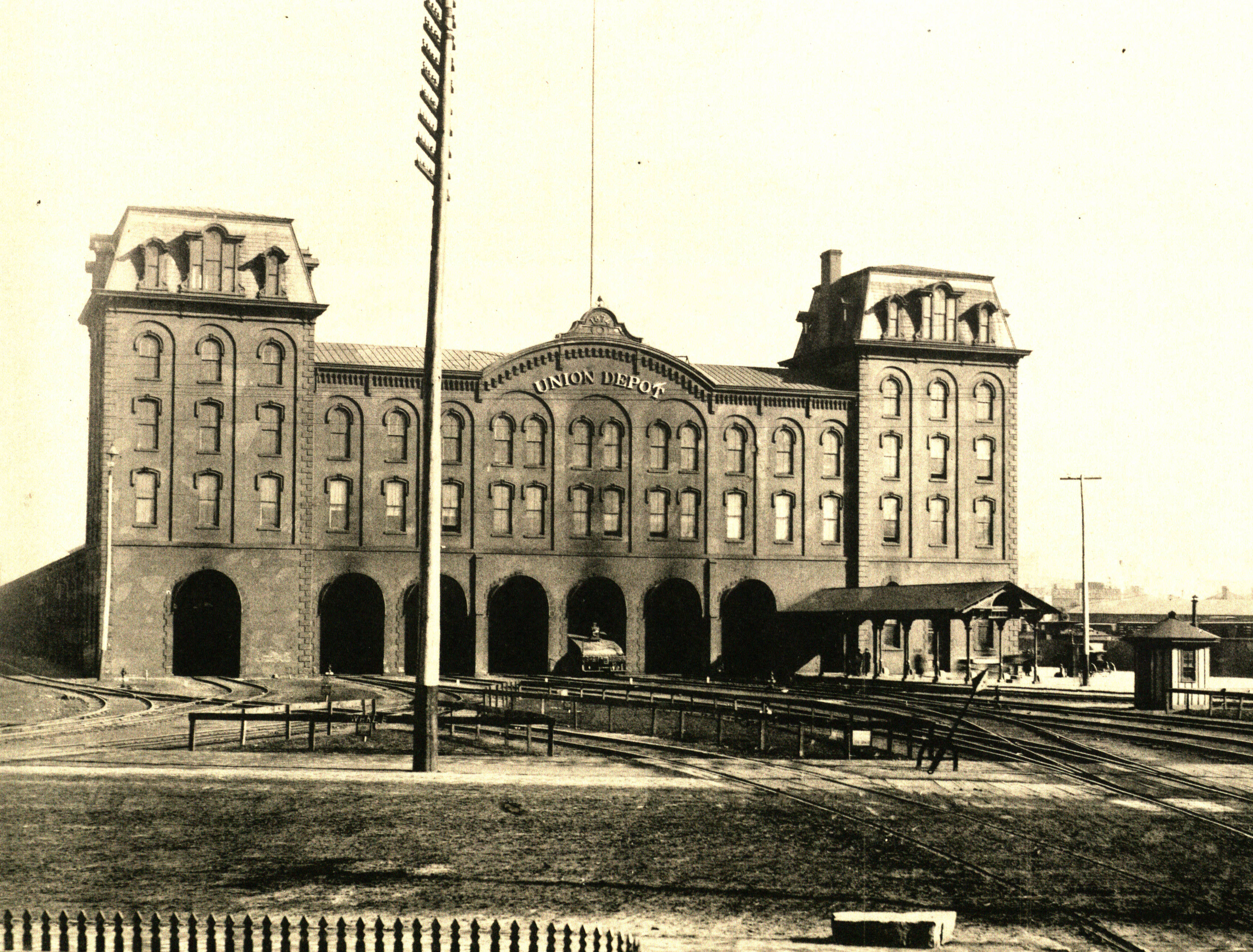
The second Columbus Union Station c. 1889

In May 1873, work was begun on the second union station north of the existing station, and it opened on February 14, 1875. The first station was then demolished. Compared to its wooden predecessor, this new station was far more substantial. Constructed of brick, it had a large waiting room, ticket offices and railroad offices at the front of the structure. Seven tracks entered the structure and a long train shed kept passengers dry. In 1875, 42 daily passenger trains departed from the station.

=== High Street crossing ===
The City of Columbus continued to grow northward with the opening of Ohio State University in 1870. With the opening of the new union station, thirteen tracks now crossed North High Street. The congestion between train and road traffic became unbearable. In 1875, a $45,000 tunnel was built under the tracks to allow streetcars and horsecars to pass under the tracks. An extra mule was stationed at the tunnel entrance to assist horsecars up the steep grade. The tunnel was 150 feet (46 m) long with 550-foot (170 m) approaches on either side. It was so dark and smelly that only the horsecar passengers, who had no other choice, would use it.

=== The third station (1897) ===
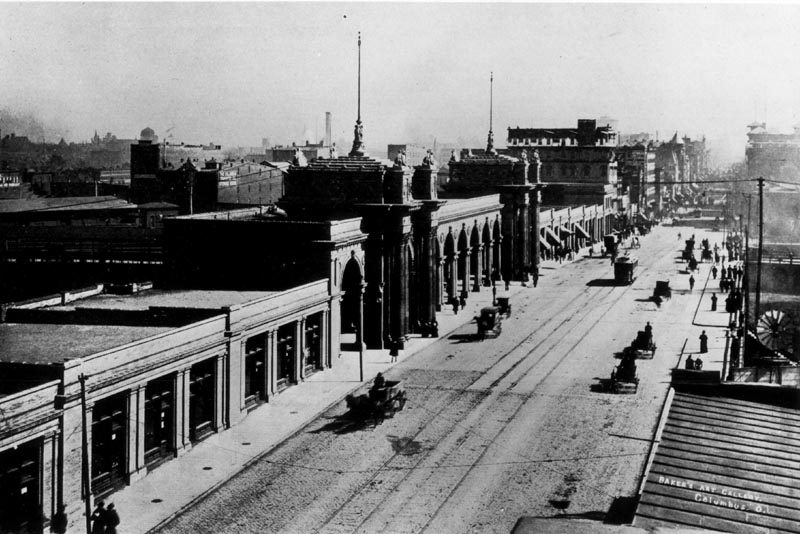
The third and final Columbus Union Station in the early 1900s. This shows the arcade portion of the station on the High Street viaduct over the tracks. View looking south along High Street.

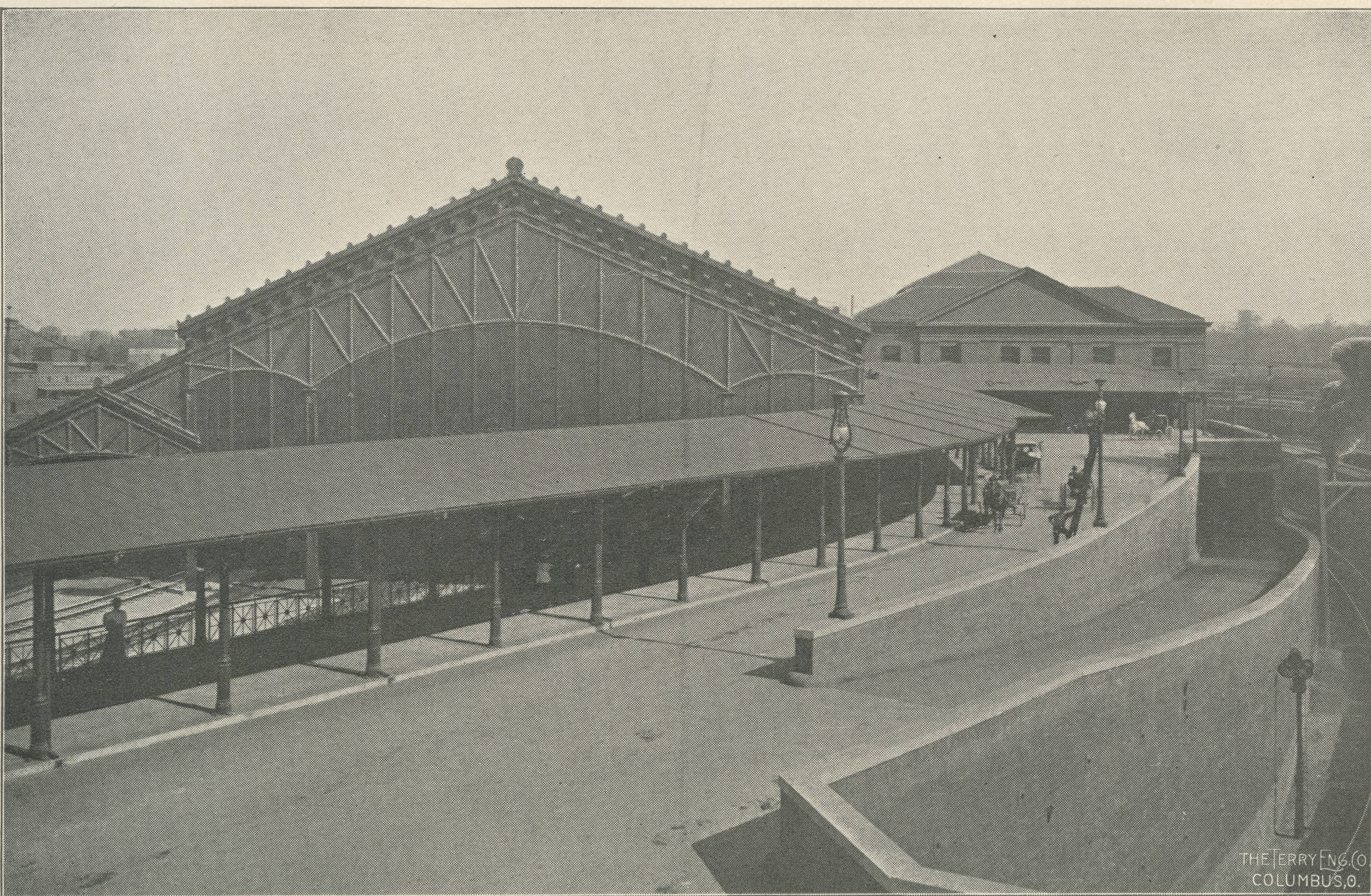
Train shed and station building c.1898

In 1891 the traffic situation on High Street reached a crisis, with the roadway blocked for up to seven hours per day by crossing trains. As well, the Columbus Board of Trade (the city's chamber of commerce) rallied for support of a modern and grand station to fit their view of the city.

In 1893 the architectural firm of Daniel H. Burnham & Company of Chicago began planning a new facility. A key feature of the new station would be a road viaduct over the tracks, finally solving the traffic/train problem on North High Street. In 1893 the old station was handling 112 passenger trains per day. The Toledo and Ohio Central Railroad left Union Station in 1896, establishing their own Toledo and Ohio Central Railroad Station.

The new station opened in 1897, and the arcade was finished in 1899. The arcade was unique to Columbus and consisted of stores and offices built atop the viaduct and facing High Street. An elevated roadway connected High Street to the station to the east. The station increased the number of depot tracks from seven to nine.

The architecture of the station drew on Burnham's experience designing the Chicago World's Fair in 1893. The style was Beaux-Arts Classicism, a late 19th-century style often applied to monumental structures.

In May 1928, part of the arcade was demolished to expand the driveway to the station to better accommodate automobiles. New York Central moved their Toledo and Ohio Central services back to Union Station in 1930. In April 1931, the train shed was replaced with an enclosed concourse.

Columbus was not spared from the sharp decline in train travel after the 1940s. In 1956, Columbus was down to 42 daily passenger trains, the lowest number since 1875. Daily passenger trains fell to 21 in 1962, and just 10 in 1970. It was clear that the completion of the interstates and popularity of automobiles would soon mean the end of passenger rail service in Columbus. On May 1, 1971, Amtrak took over most of what was left of passenger service in the United States. On January 17, 1974, the station's arcade was listed on the National Register of Historic Places, noted in emergency as plans existed to demolish the structure.

=== Decline and demolition (1976–1979) ===
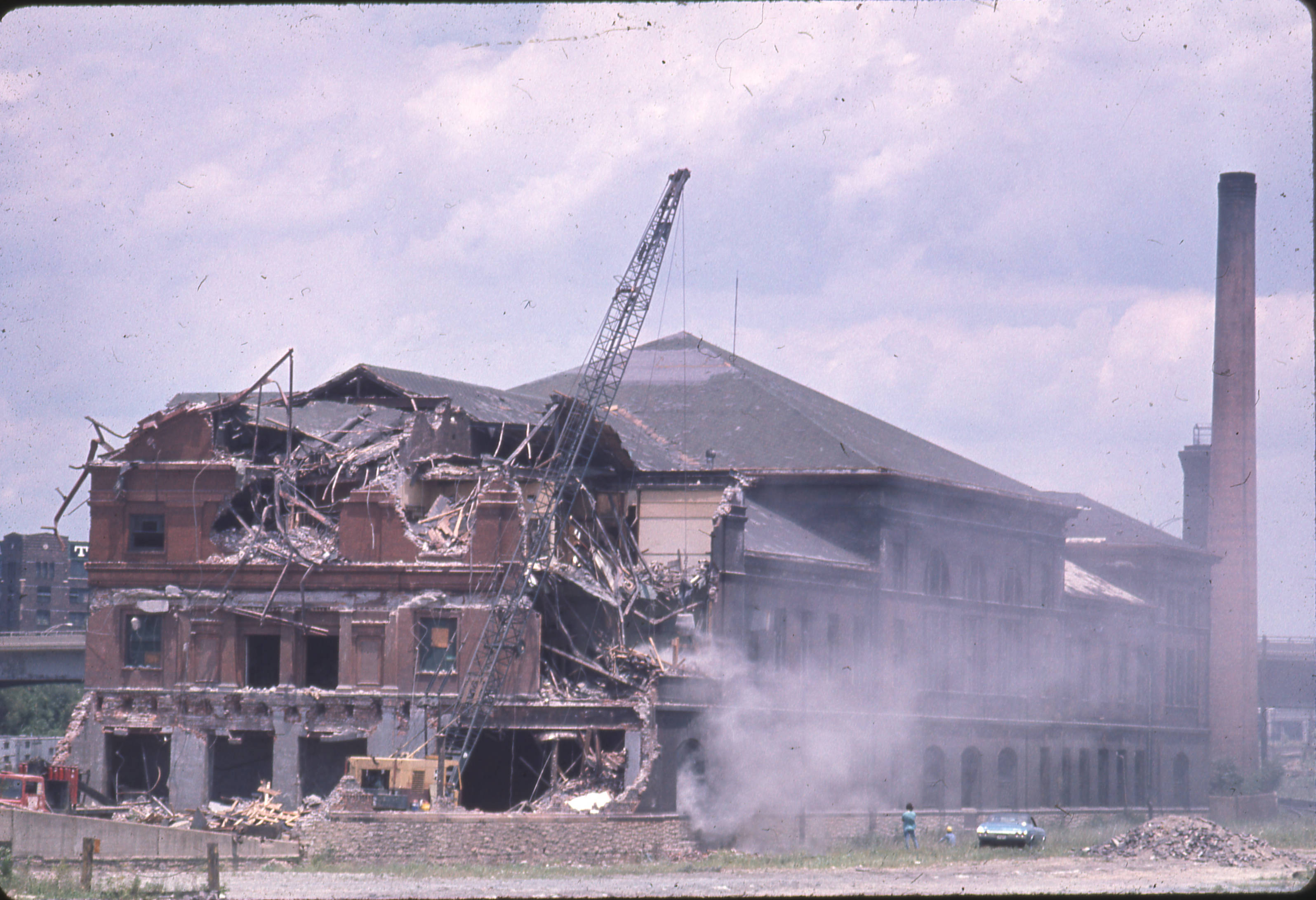
Razing the third Union Station, c. 1977

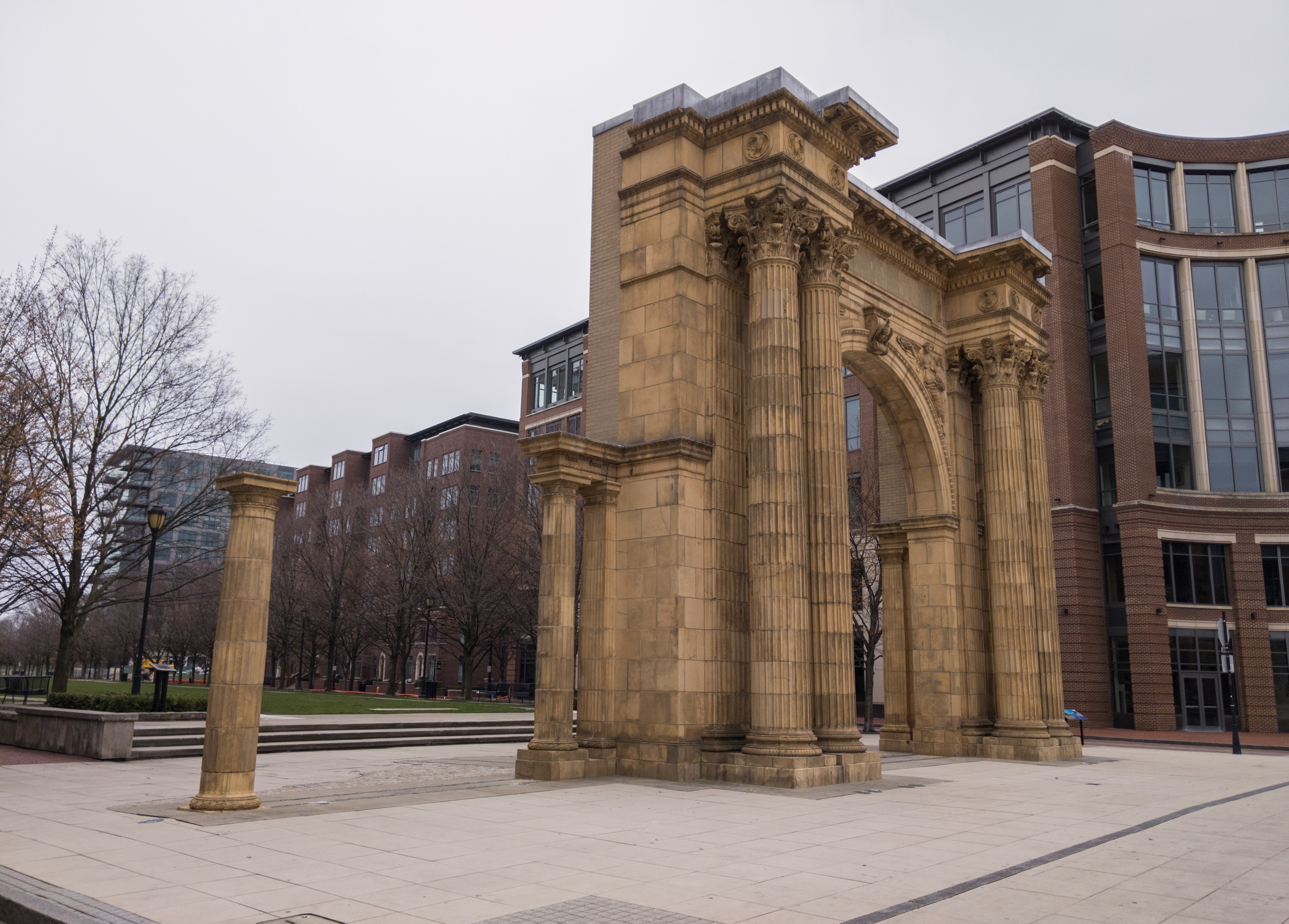
The Union Station arch in its current location in McFerson Commons

Amtrak cut back rail service to a single train, the New York-Kansas City National Limited (formerly the Spirit of St. Louis). The restaurant and newsstand were closed.

The demolition and replacement of Union Station dates to a 1969-1975 lawsuit against the Columbus-based Battelle Memorial Institute (BMI). The institute was formed as a nonprofit and still operates as one, though its improper profit uses led to the lawsuit. As a result, BMI offered about $80 million for various causes, including $36.5 million to establish a convention center at the site of Union Station. BMI established the Battelle Commons Corporation in 1974 to handle the project.

Battelle Commons Corporation applied for grants to create a transit center as part of the convention center, including from the Urban Mass Transit Administration (UMTA) and Federal Highway Administration. The transit center project was supported by the Central Ohio Transit Authority (COTA), Columbus's mass transit agency. The proposed hub, titled TransCenter, was to include 2,000 square feet inside the restored Union Station arcade, containing transit information, ticket offices, a bus waiting and loading area, and entranceways to transit below street-level. A new 20,000-square-foot bus facility and COTA office was to be constructed alongside the arcade. The proposed funding included $6.24 million from the UMTA for buildings and platforms, $1.05 million from the Federal Railroad Administration for restoring the arcade, and Battelle contributing $1.56 million for the building and platforms, and $450,000 for the arcade. The combined project was to cost $9.3 million. It was noted that Battelle made no effort to find funding from obvious sources including the State Historic Preservation Office, the National Endowment for the Arts, Department of the Interior, Community Development Block Grants, or General Revenue Sharing Funds.

On October 19, 1976, Battelle's trustees decided to demolish the station, stating it would be an "imprudent use of Battelle's money", even though it was noted to be a small portion. The organization gave no warning to outside organizations. The State Historic Preservation Office was not advised, nor was COTA; COTA's executive director stated the public mistakenly blamed it for the demolition. The City of Columbus also stated it was not involved in the decision, but knew Battelle was considering it. Battelle believed the demolition would not block the pending federal funding.

At 6 pm on Friday, October 22, 1976, S.G. Loewendick & Sons demolished nearly the entire arcade. By 6 pm on the next day, a temporary restraining order secured by the Ohio Historical Society halted the demolition. The order noted that improper procedures were followed in planning its demolition. Battelle then allowed the historical society 120 days to remove the remaining remnant of the demolition, a single arch left standing; Battelle offered no funds to help preserve or move the arch. COTA's director still expressed his desire for TransCenter to be built, despite the arcade's loss. Battelle published development plans with the arcade removed as soon as October 24. The arcade's demolition prompted the UMTA to withdraw all $6.24 million in funding, stating the act violated the spirit of the law and was inconsistent with UMTA requirements.

While the arcade was gone, Union Station continued to serve rail passengers until the morning of April 28, 1977. On that date, Amtrak moved its operations to a metal shed ("Amshack") east of the station near the 4th Street viaduct when it became apparent that the cost of operating the station was too great. The last train to serve the main station building was a westbound National Limited, which left for Kansas City at 9:17 am that morning.

The station was finally demolished in September 1979. The National Limited itself was eliminated a month later, ending about 130 years of intercity rail service in Columbus.

=== Current state and legacy ===
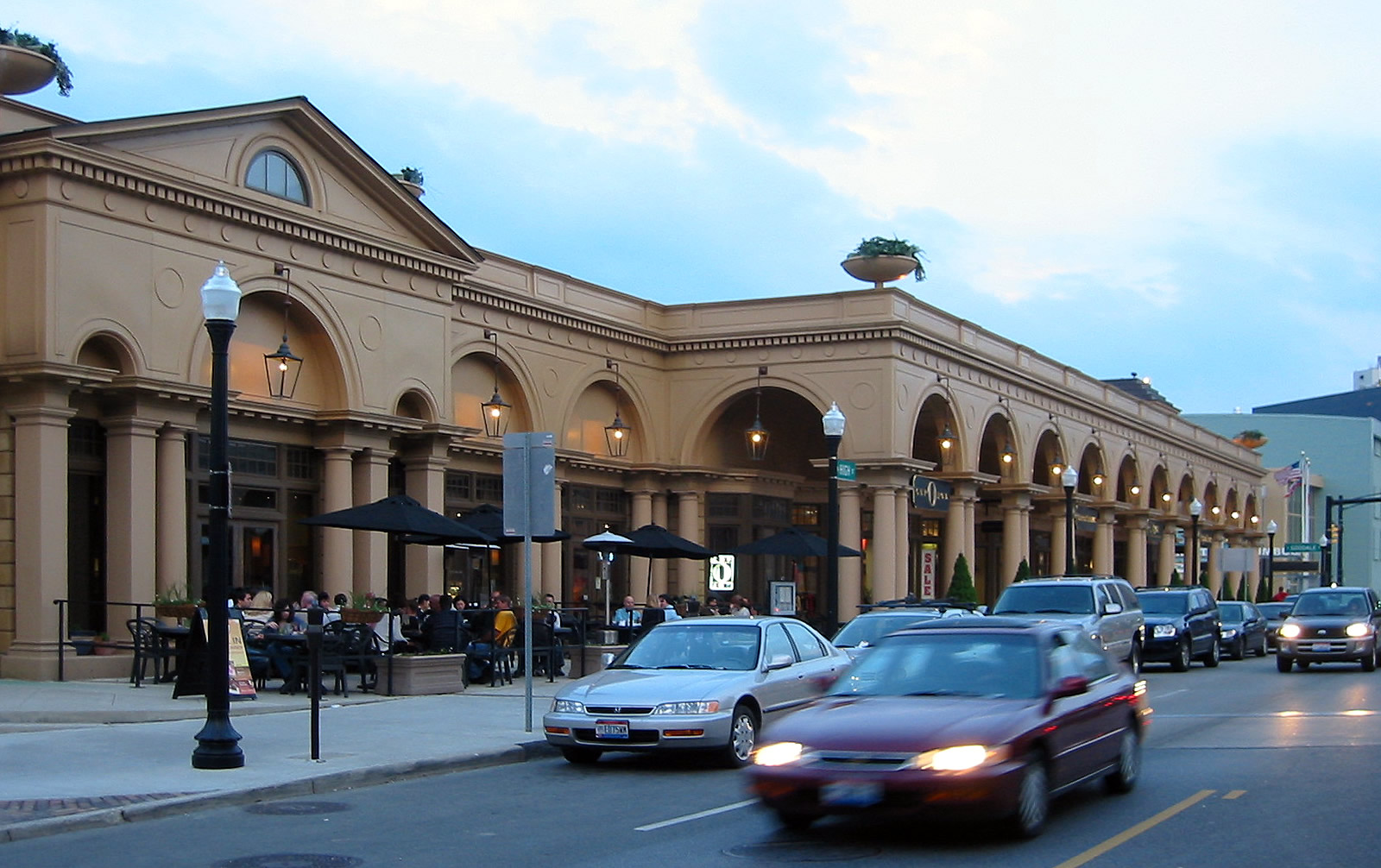
The Cap at Union Station, built in 2004 to reflect the third station's design

The freight yards and servicing facilities located east of the station had been replaced by the construction of the new Buckeye Yard near Hilliard by the Penn Central in the late 1960s. The multitrack yards and shop areas eventually gave way to I-670 in the early 1990s. The viaduct over I-670 was constructed with a cap, and shops lining High Street reminiscent of the long gone arcade.

Amtrak has not returned to Columbus since the end of the National Limited. However, as part of the Ohio Hub plan, there are plans to build a new multi-modal station on at least part of the site of the former rail terminal. It is planned to be located between the Ohio Center and the Greater Columbus Convention Center. A future streetcar or light rail line could be built on the west end of the proposed station.

=== Gallery ===
Views from c. 1975:

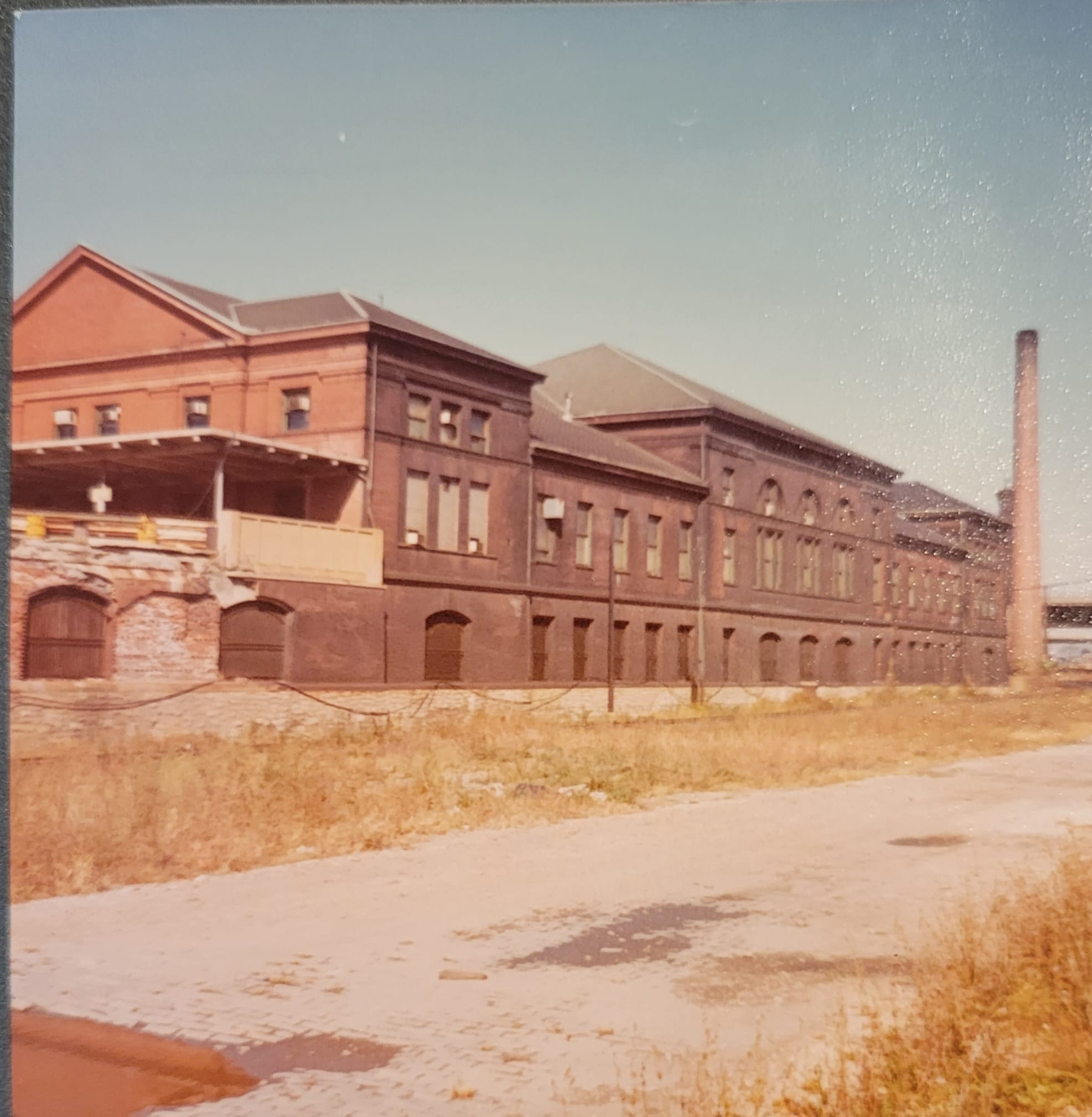
Station building exterior

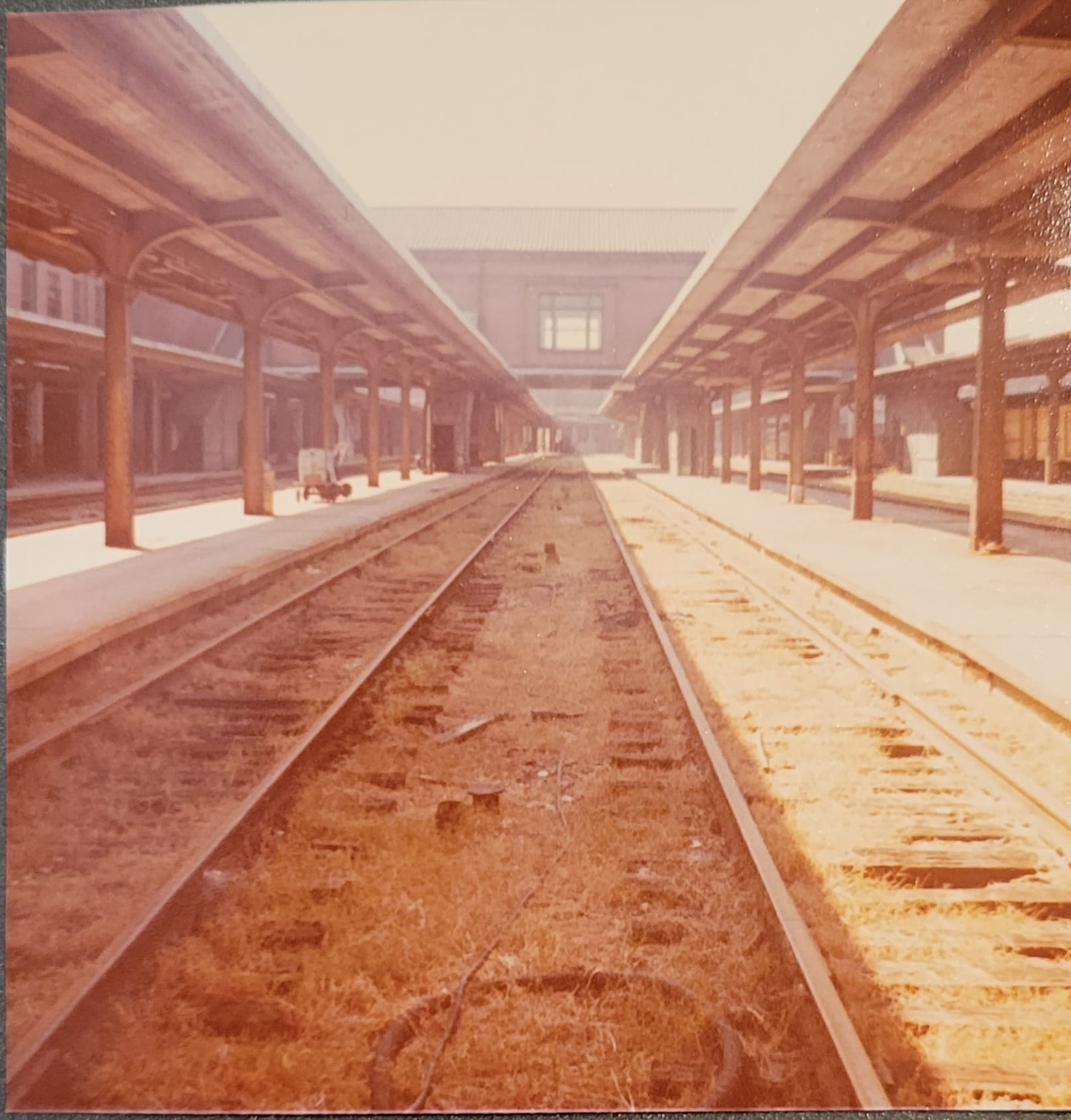
Tracks and platforms

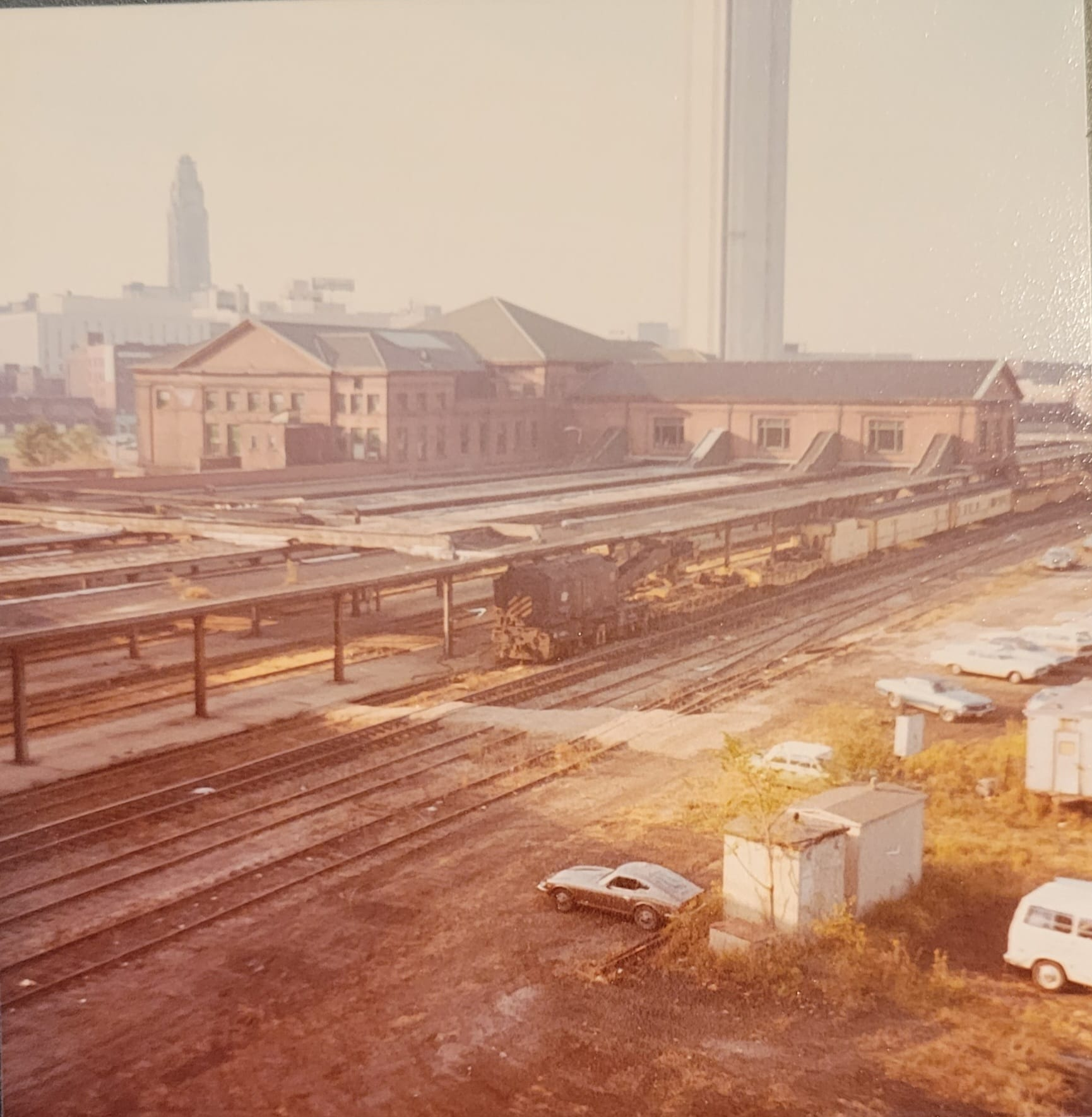
Platform and station view

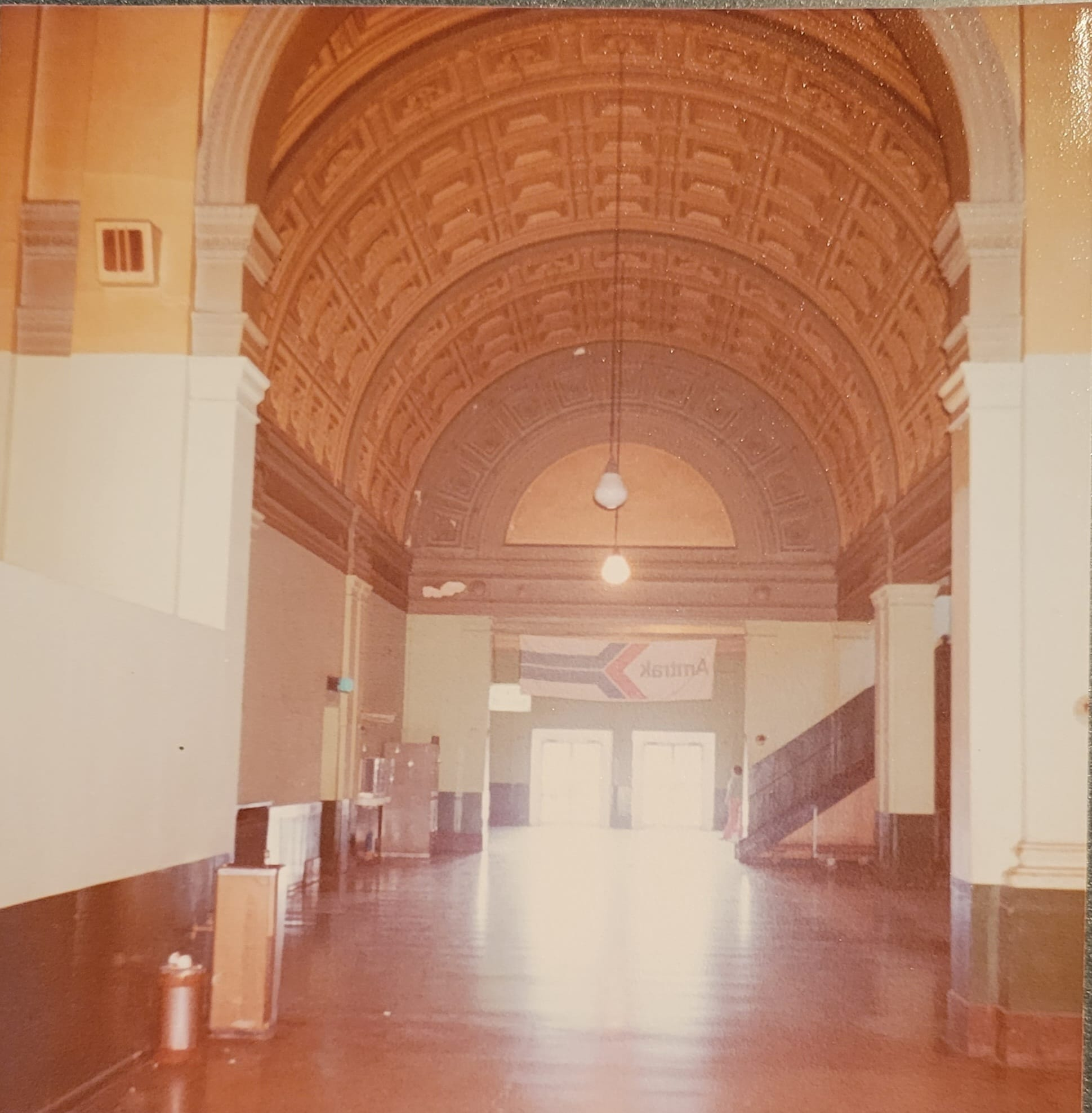
Hall

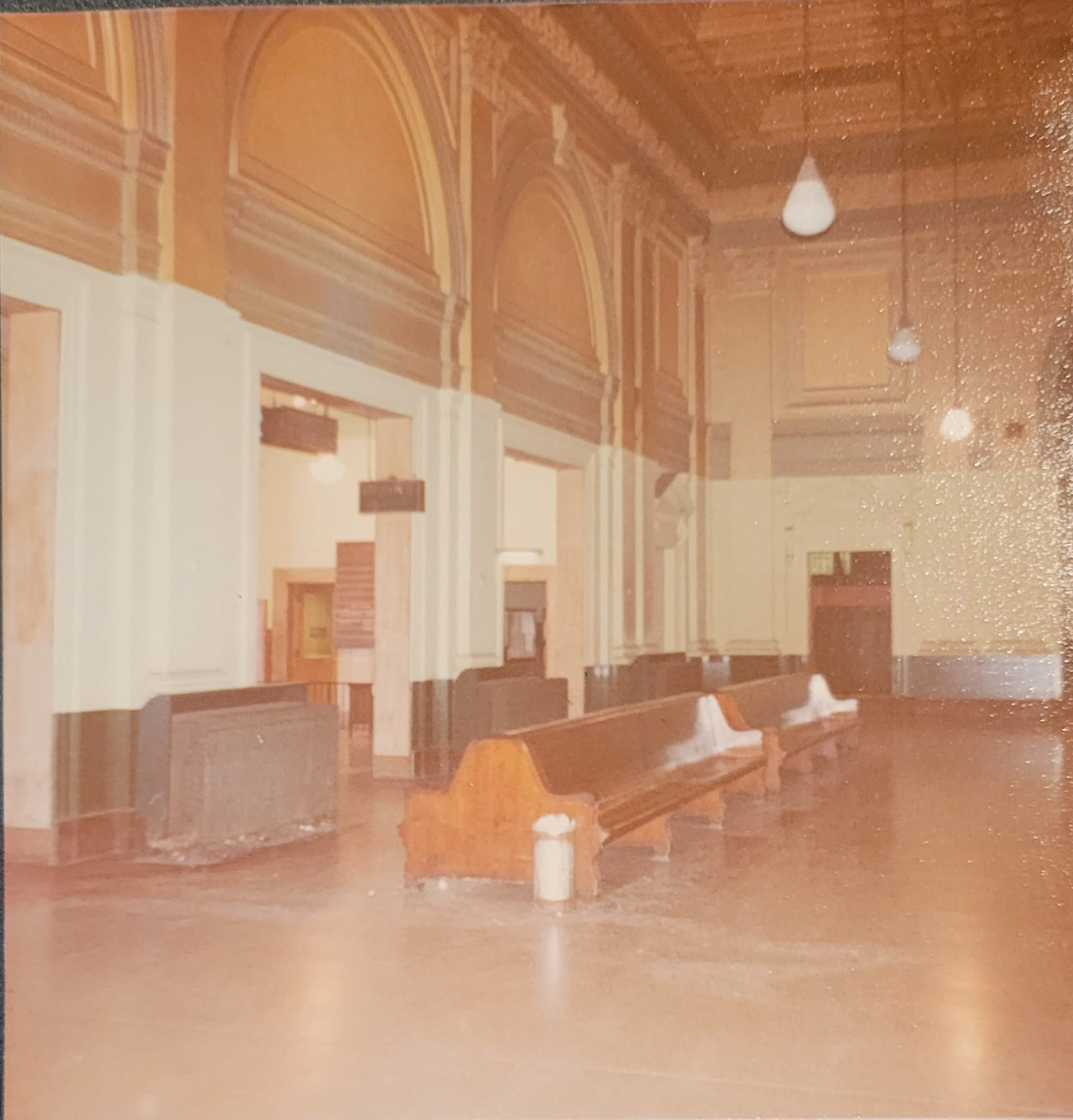
Waiting room

== Proposed new station ==
In July 2021 the Franklin County Convention Facilities Authority contracted with LMN Architects and HNTB Engineering to conduct a site assessment and programming study of three possible Amtrak station locations at or near the Greater Columbus Convention Center.

On Greater Columbus Passenger Rail Station Study, which was released in early January 2022, details a plan for the construction of a new downtown two-level station near the intersection of High Street and Nationwide Boulevard. The proposed single platform / single track station could be built at a cost of $23 million.

== See also ==
- National Register of Historic Places listings in Columbus, Ohio
