= McFerson Commons =

Park in Columbus, Ohio, U.S.

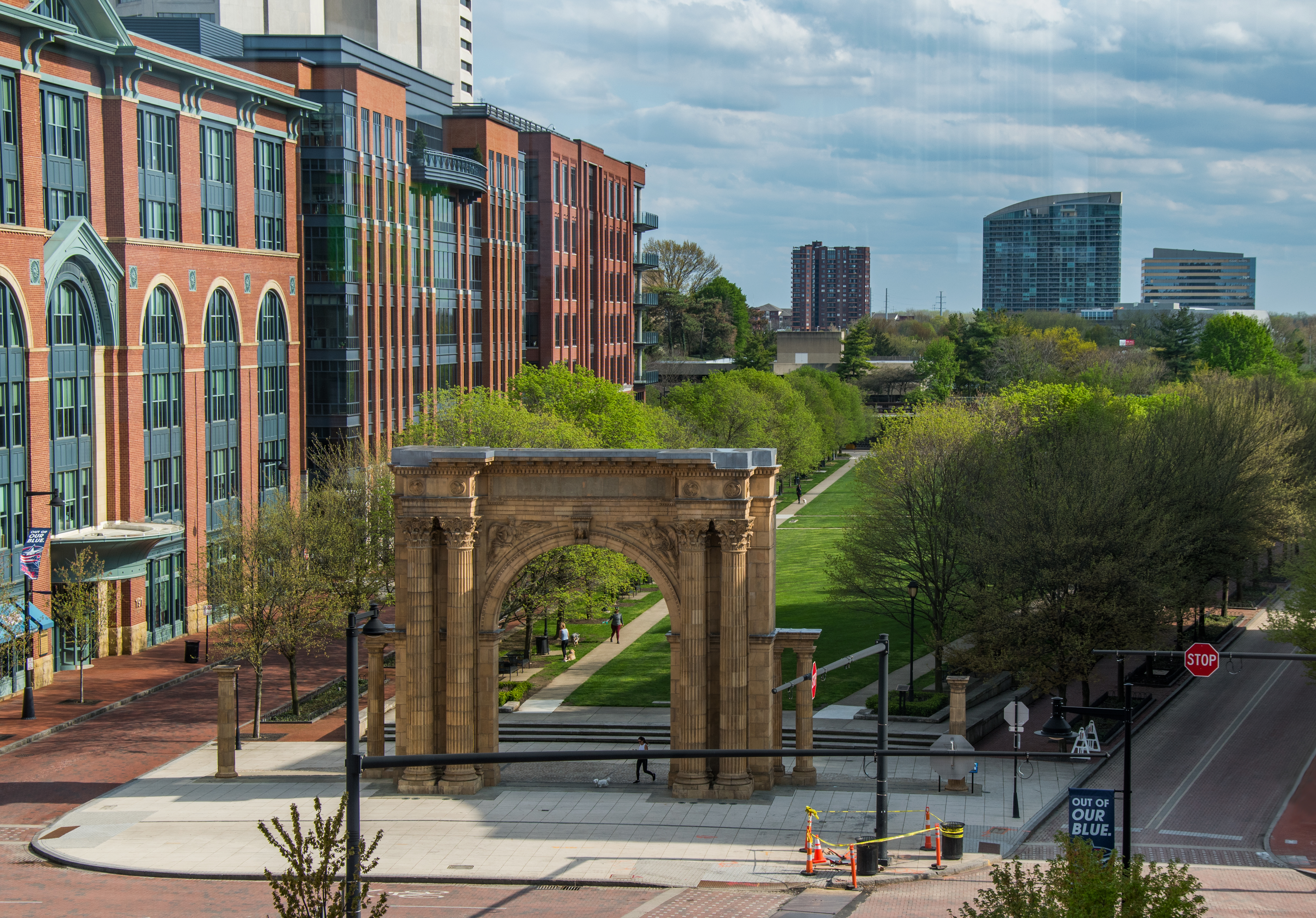
- Interactive map of McFerson Commons
- Location: 218 West Street, Columbus, Ohio
- Coordinates: 39°58′01″N 83°00′26″W
- Area: 2.21 acres (0.89 ha)
- Administrator: Columbus Recreation and Parks Department
- Parking: Meters, surface lots, garages
- Public transit: 3, 8, 71, 72, 73; CoGo
- Website: columbus.gov/McFerson-Commons-Park

McFerson Commons, originally Arena Park, is a 2.2-acre (0.9 ha) park in Columbus, Ohio's Arena District neighborhood. The focal point of the park is the Union Station arch, salvaged before the demolition of Columbus's Union Station.

The park was created around 1999 after demolition of the Ohio Penitentiary, as a recreation area for residents of the surrounding Arena District. In 1999, the park was named for Dimon R. McFerson and the Union Station arch was installed in its current location. The park now hosts annual events, family sports, and other gatherings.

== Attributes and history ==
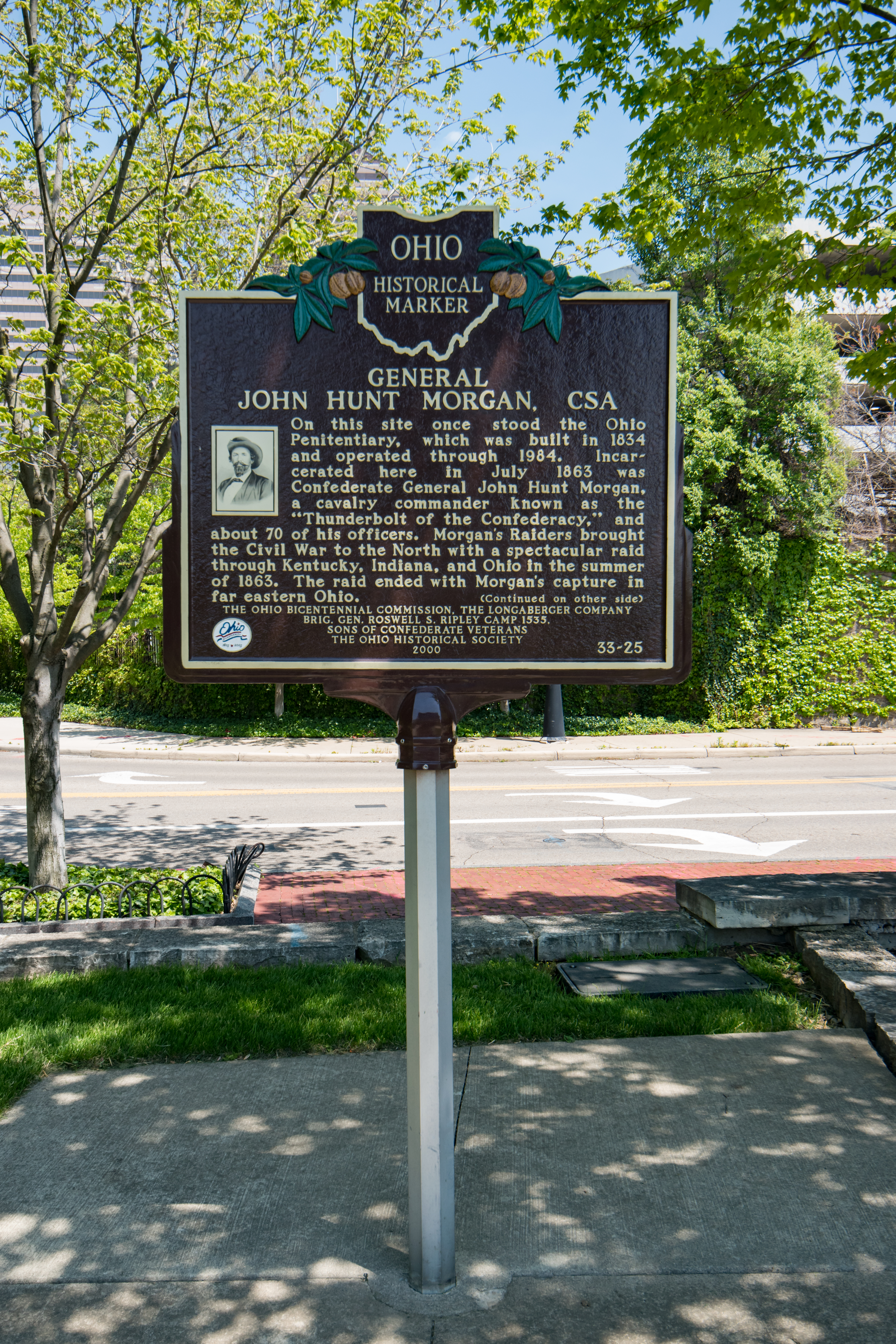
John Hunt Morgan marker (reverse)

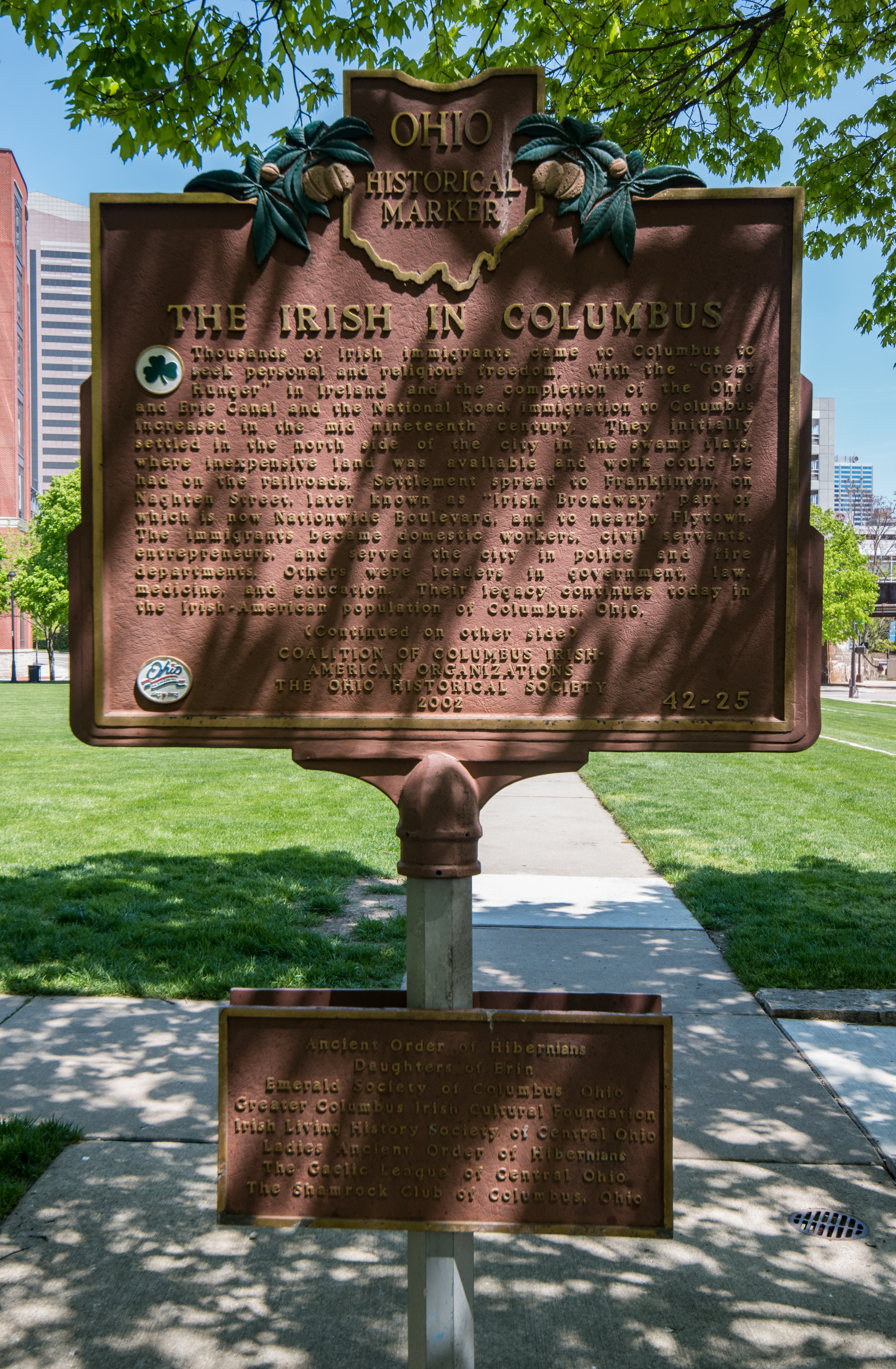
Columbus's Irish population marker (reverse)

The park was developed by Nationwide Insurance after demolition of the Ohio Penitentiary, which occupied the site and surrounding area from 1834 to 1998. The park was originally known as Arena Park, and was renamed for Nationwide's then-retiring chairman Dimon R. McFerson in September 2000.

McFerson Commons neighbors Nationwide Arena and North Bank Park. The park's open lawn space is used for family sports and events.

Events hosted in the park include:

- Arena District Kickball League games, on weekday evenings beginning in August
- Columbus Blue Jackets Winter Park, an NHL-sized ice rink operating for a month each winter
- Opening ceremonies and starting line for the Pelotonia annual biking event
- Viewing of the Red, White & Boom! fireworks display
- 5Ks and other races including the PetPromise Rescue Run, Columbus Breakthrough for Brain Tumors 5K and Bull Run
- Flag football games
- Weddings

=== Union Station arch ===
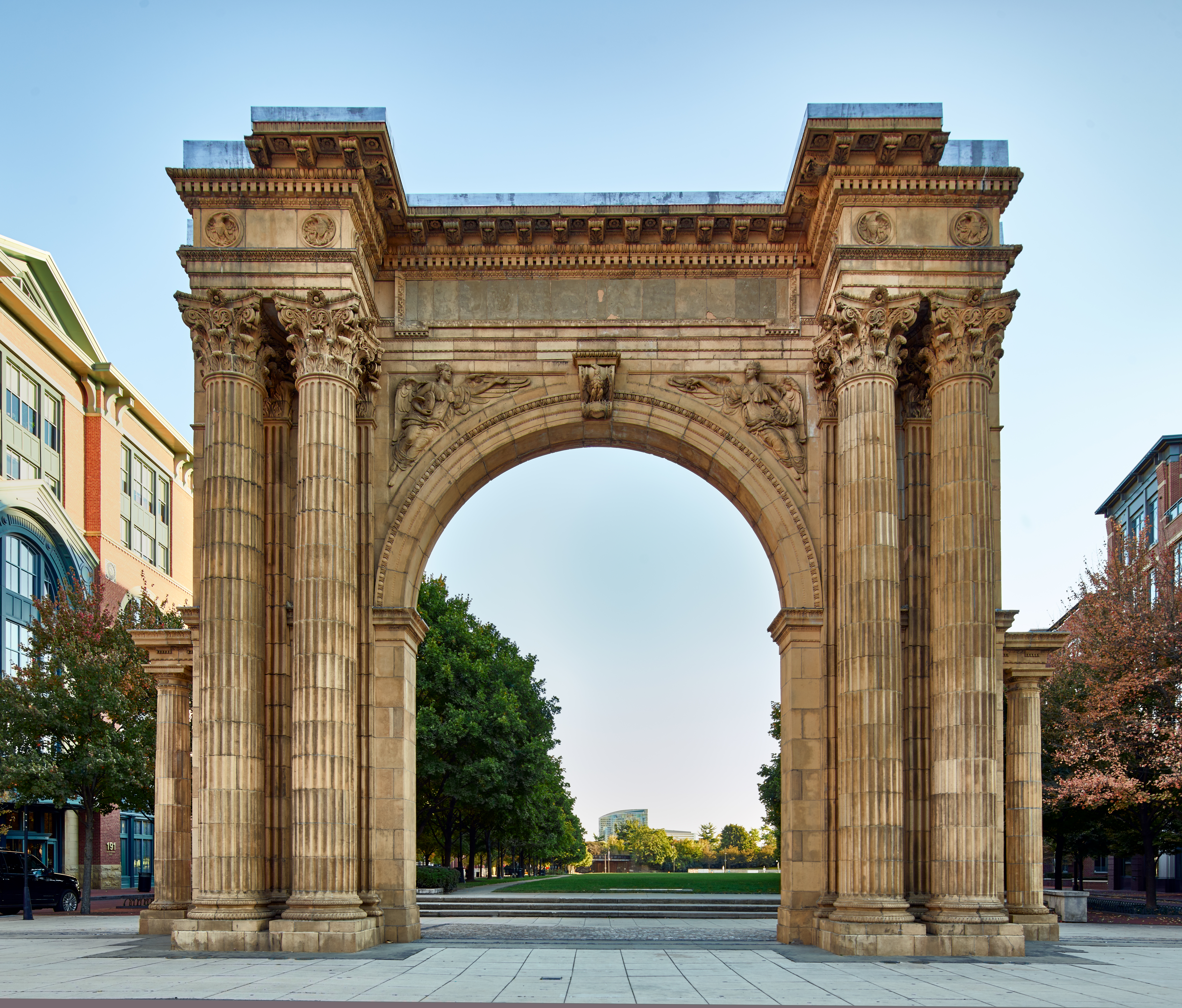
Arch from Union Station

The park, sometimes known as Arch Park, has an old Beaux Arts arch as its central focal point. The arch was part of Columbus's Union Station, designed by Daniel Burnham in 1893, but demolished from 1976 to 1979 to make way for the Greater Columbus Convention Center. The arch, the only remaining portion of the station, was moved to the park.

The arch was originally the northern of two identical grand archways in the colonnade leading to the station. The southern archway was demolished along with a third of the colonnade in 1928. The structure consists of a recessed semicircular arch flanked by four fluted round Corinthian columns. An angel relief is carved into each of the arch's extradoes. The arch has friezes with decorative eagle medallions. Above this is a denticulated cornice, and above that was a wider frieze with triglyphs and alternating medallions with classical busts. Above that was another denticulated cornice with gargoyles. The pedestals above the Corinthian columns featured statue groups.

The arch was moved from its original site during demolition, which began at 6 pm on Friday, October 22, 1976. S.G. Loewendick & Sons then demolished nearly the entire arcade. By 6 pm on the next day, a temporary restraining order secured by the Ohio Historical Society halted the demolition. The order noted that improper procedures were followed in planning its demolition. Battelle then allowed the historical society 120 days to remove the remaining remnant of the demolition, the single arch left standing; Battelle offered no funds to help preserve or move the arch. The arch was moved to a site nearby, landscaped and opened as Arch Park on June 7, 1980. In 1999, the arch moved to its current location. A set of decorative cherubs and medallions topped each of the ends at the top of the arch; the pieces were removed and placed in storage during the move to McFerson Commons, and have not been restored atop the arch since then.

== See also ==
- List of parks in Columbus, Ohio
