= S.G. Loewendick & Sons =

Demolition company in Grove City, Ohio

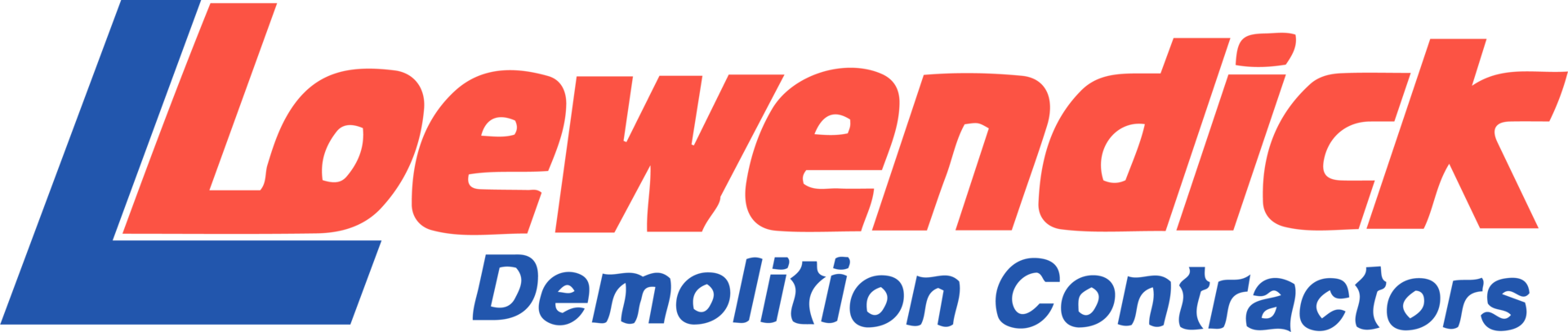
- Industry: Demolition
- Founded: 1929; 97 years ago
- Founder: Sylvester G. Loewendick
- Headquarters: 2877 Jackson Pike, Grove City, Ohio
- Key people: David Loewendick
- Website: loewendick.com

S.G. Loewendick & Sons, also known as Loewendick Demolition Contractors, is a demolition company based in Grove City, Ohio, a suburb of Columbus. The company is the largest specializing in demolition in Central Ohio. It has torn down most of the landmark buildings in Columbus in recent decades, including Union Station, the Ohio Penitentiary, the Christopher Inn, the Deshler Hotel, and the Ohio State University Drake Performance and Event Center.

The company was founded in 1929 by Sylvester G. Loewendick. Its business expanded during a construction boom after World War II, and was involved in numerous large demolition contracts. By 1988, the company was making $5 million annually, and had 100 employees, including eight Loewendick family members. The company is looked upon unfavorably by historic preservationists for its landmark demolitions, although others favorably view its salvage work, recycling, and work during fires.

== History ==
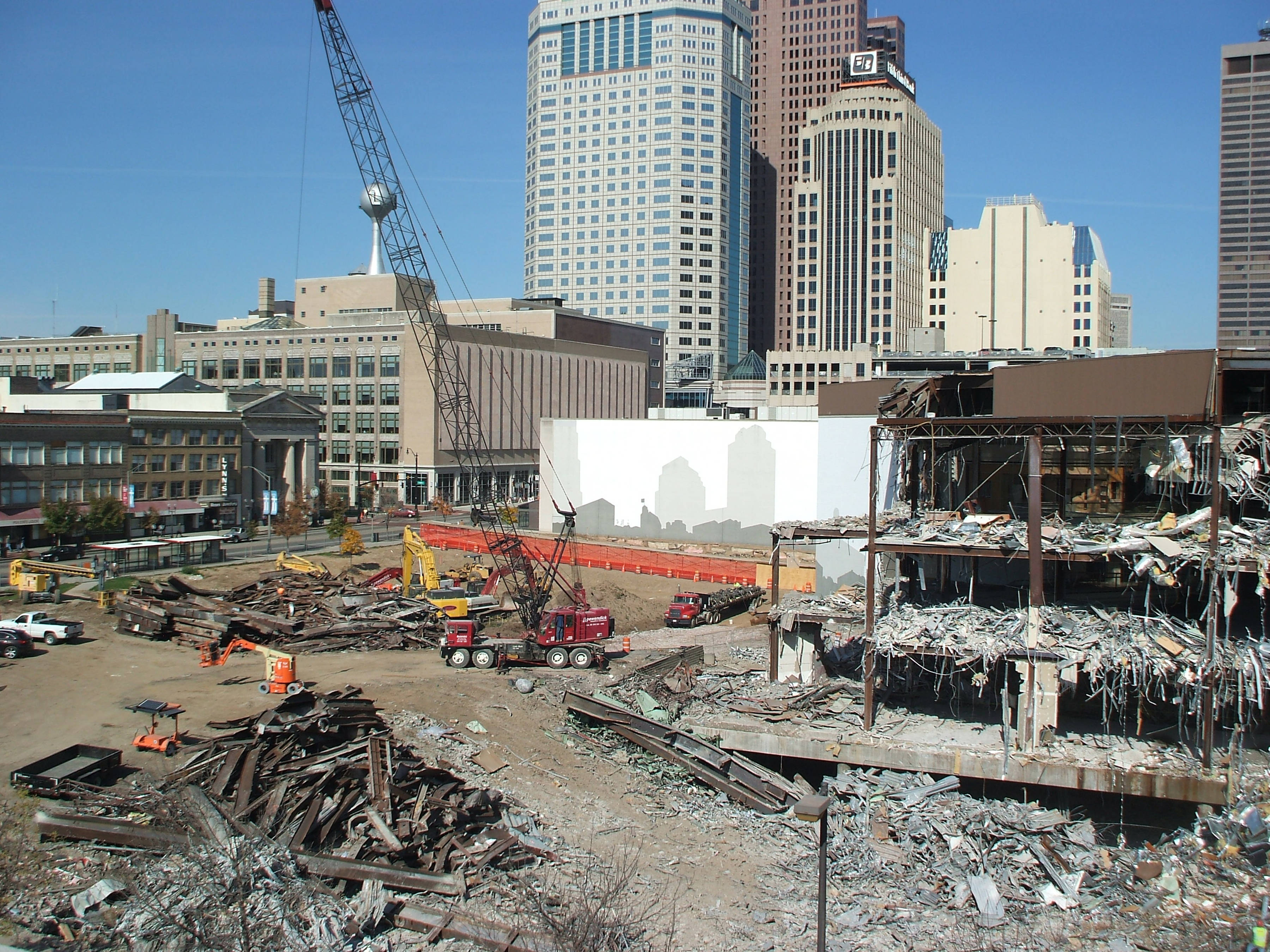
The demolition crew at the Columbus City Center mall in 2009, later made into Columbus Commons

S.G. Loewendick & Sons was founded by Sylvester G. "Tedo" Loewendick. He was the son of a German immigrant who settled in Newark, Ohio. Tedo was employed as a shop foreman and then garage owner for years, though in 1929 moved to demolition, tearing down several houses for material to create his own new house. Tedo also did some construction work; several of his buildings still stood in Newark into the 1980s. The Loewendicks owned a 25-acre farm near Newark, which Tedo's wife ran until they moved to Columbus in the 1950s.

Tedo's son, Jim Loewendick, attributed the business's early success to World War II, saying "Adolf Hitler put the country on its feet". A post-war construction boom in Columbus led to the development of highways and urban renewal, which created a need for demolition contracts. In the 1950s, Tedo dropped construction and began to focus solely on the demolition company, and with his three sons, began to operate in a radius of 500 miles (800 km) around Columbus. Flytown was replaced by the Goodale Redevelopment Project, and the historic Central Market was replaced during the Market-Mohawk project. S.G. Loewendick was significantly involved in that area in the 1960s, including demolishing hundreds of acres of housing for highway development. In 1961, the company demolished 53 houses for a highway interchange near Fort Hayes. In 1963, Loewendick demolished 300 houses, and in the following year they demolished 91 houses for the incoming Nationwide Children's Hospital, 50 houses for Market-Mohawk, and 104 houses for the new I-71. In the 1970s, Jim Loewendick's son died in a freak accident on one of their work sites. In 1974, Tedo died, leaving his son Ralph as the company president. By 1988, the company had a revenue of $5 million per year, owning two landfills, a roll-off container service for construction site dumpsters, and a tire shredder facility. Seven Loewendick family members and one stepson were part of the approximately 100 company employees. Tedo's grandson Dave Loewendick now owns the business. The family also owns Frank Road Recycling Solutions and Central Ohio Contractors.

== Demolition projects ==
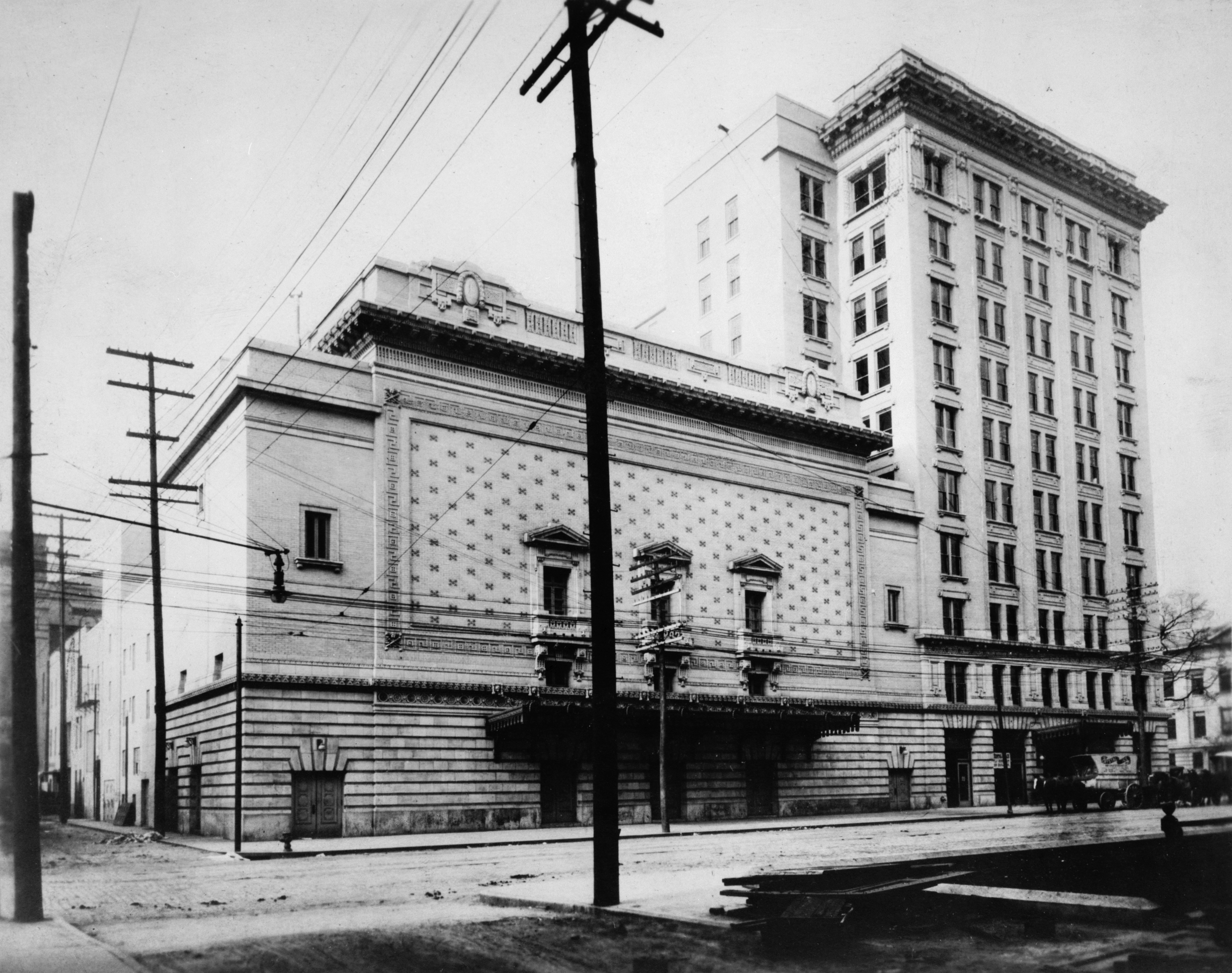
Hartman Building and Theater

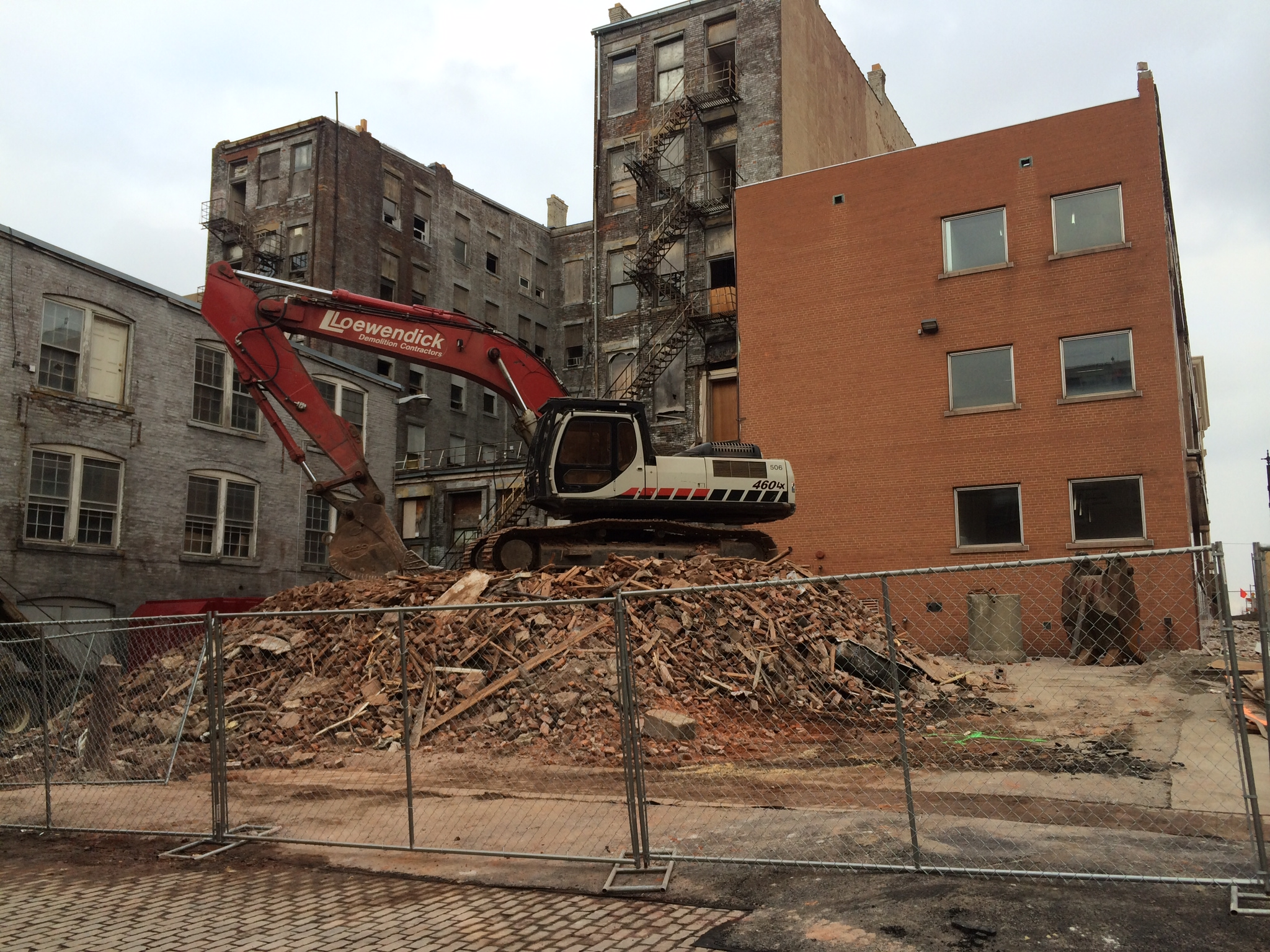
Loewendick excavator at the Trautman Building demolition project, 2014

Loewendick has demolished Columbus landmarks Union Station, the Ohio Penitentiary, the Christopher Inn, and the Deshler Hotel. The company also demolished the downtown Columbus City Center mall, Franklinton's Veterans Memorial (since replaced by the National Veterans Memorial and Museum), a former location of the Columbus Africentric High School, and a Holiday Inn in the suburb of Worthington. The company also was involved in the demolition of the Beasley-Deshler Hotel, the Chittenden Hotel, Halle's, and the Hartman Theater in Columbus. They were also to demolish the Beggs Building, since renovated as part of the Fifth Third Center. In 1961, the company razed the Virginia Hotel and Columbus Citizen building to make room for the currently-named Renaissance Columbus Downtown Hotel.

The company has been involved in dangerous work, including during or after a fire. The Dunhill Clothiers burned down in 1974, and the company hauled aways pieces of the building as it burned. During a fire in February 1977, the company had difficulty tearing down the building, which was covered in 3- to 4-foot icicles. During a fire in the Short North in September 1988, Dave Loewendick helped a fireman out of debris, just before a four-story wall fell behind them. The company won the "Highly Commended Award" in the World Demolition Awards in 2010 for its demolition of Columbus City Center.

The company, originally involved in both construction and demolition, still focuses on reusing items, including salvaging architectural elements. In 2016, the company purchased equipment allowing it to begin crushing and recycling concrete. Its work in the third phase of demolishing the Veteran's Memorial (removing its foundation) therefore involved a 100% recycling rate. On average, the company gets 50-60 percent recyclable material out of their projects. Columbus mandates 25 percent, and the City Center demolition project mandated 50 percent. For that project, the company recycled 90 percent of the materials.

== Reputation ==
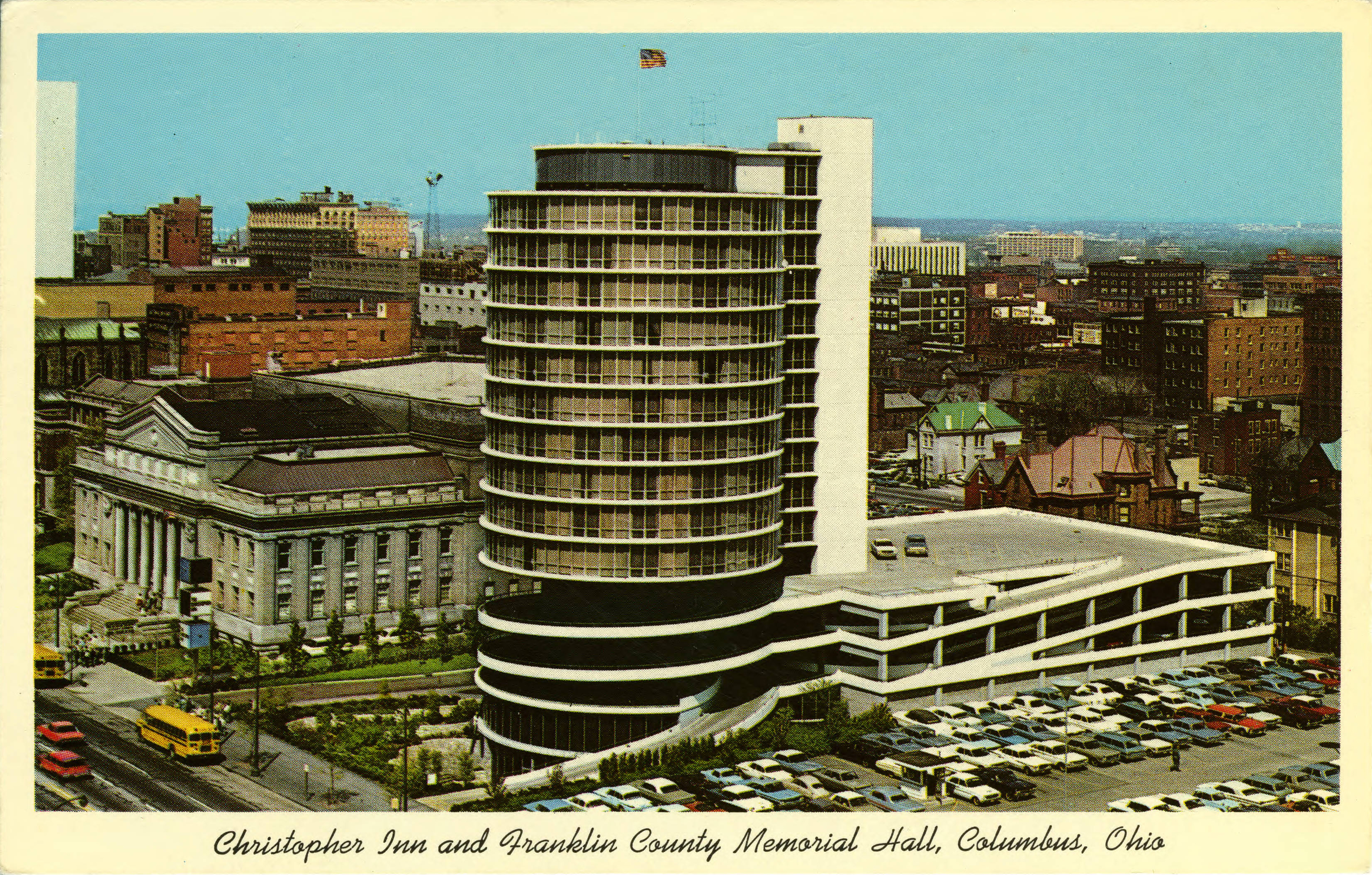
The Christopher Inn and Memorial Hall

S.G. Loewendick & Sons is locally known, as it is the largest demolition company in Central Ohio. It has demolished most of the landmark buildings in Columbus in recent decades. The company offers tours of its facility to local students, educating on recycling; the company also offers the use of a landfill for firefighter search-and-rescue missions.

The business's current owner, Dave Loewendick, is unconcerned about his reputation for demolition, envisioning a pile of rubble where office towers or shopping malls stand. In a 1988 interview, he expressed remorse over not demolishing the Ohio Theatre, saying "We were about six hours from having that building". He expressed interest in demolishing Columbus's Central High School, as well as Memorial Hall, a building next-door to the Christopher Inn his crew demolished. His car license plates read "Raze 1" and "Raze 2".

The Loewendick company's work has been opposed by historic preservationists. The demolition of the Columbus State Hospital was opposed by a Hilltop preservation group. In 1976, the company's demolition of Union Station was approved after orders by Battelle Commons Corporation, which had been planning to keep and restore the station's arcade. The corporation improperly went forward with demolition, and only a single arch could be saved after a court order was handed to the demolition company. In 1980, S.G. Loewendick demolished the Monypeny Hammond building. It was purchased by Nationwide Insurance Company president Dean Jeffers in order to demolish it, contrary to neighborhood redevelopment plans and a unanimous Columbus City Council resolution for the demolition to stop.

== Notable demolition projects ==
- Central Market
- Chittenden Hotel
- Christopher Inn
- Columbus City Center
- Columbus State Hospital
- Deshler Hotel
- Frederick W. Schumacher mansion
- L. Hoster Brewing Company (partial demolition)
- Ohio Penitentiary
- Trautman Building
- Union Station
