= Alfred Kelley mansion =

Former mansion in Columbus, Ohio

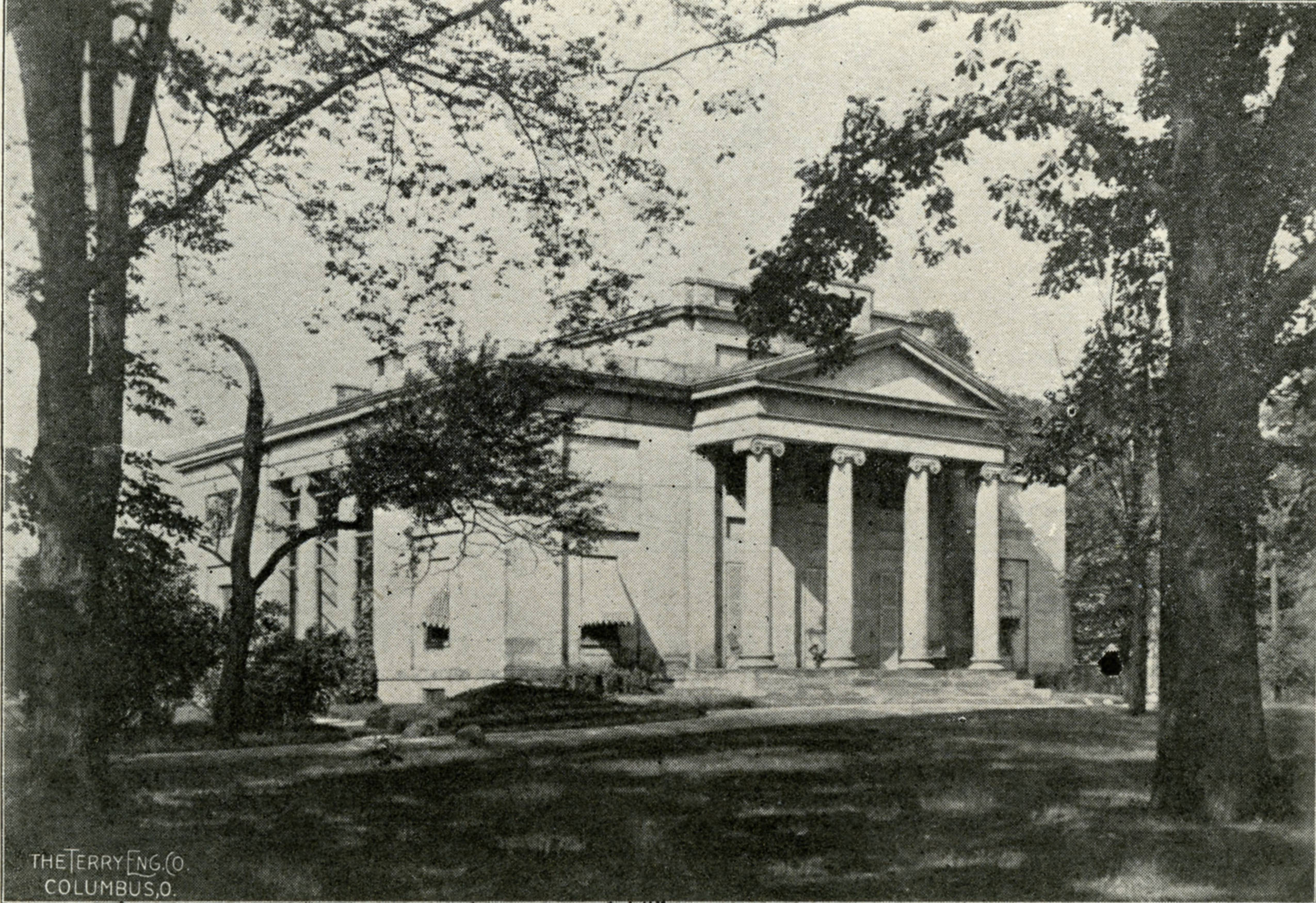
- The mansion c. 1898
- The house and relocations of its remains (coordinates are approximate)

General information
- Architectural style: Greek Revival
- Location: 282 East Broad Street, Columbus, Ohio
- Coordinates: 39.963505°N 82.992693°W
- Completed: June 1838
- Demolished: September 1961
- Owner: Alfred Kelley

The Alfred Kelley mansion was a historic house in Downtown Columbus, Ohio. It was the home of Alfred Kelley, built in 1838. The house stayed in the family for decades, and was later an Ohio governor's mansion, and further on, a Catholic school. It was abandoned in the 1950s, and was deconstructed in 1961 in order to build the Christopher Inn (extant from 1963 to 1988). A preservation committee tried to move and rebuild the house; after years and several moves, the stone remnants were placed at the Hale Farm and Village near Akron in 1973, where they remain today.

== Attributes ==
The Alfred Kelley house was a two-story house, measuring 65 feet (20 m) square and 40 feet (12 m) tall.

It was built with a warm gray sandstone from Eastern Ohio, designed in the Greek Revival style at the height of its popularity. It had a simple, symmetrical, and dignified design, presumably the work of Kelley himself. Its main portico, two stories in height, projected outward from the building. The portico's pediment was topped with a stepped parapet, an unusual feature. The other sides of the building each had recessed entrances, two stories in height, supported by two columns. The building had ten columns in total, all of the Ionic order and each constructed from a single piece of stone, said to weigh 10,000 lbs.

Kelley's property, which cost him $917 ($27,725 in 2025) in 1831, had 18 acres (7.3 ha), from Broad Street north to Long Street, and from Fifth Street east to Seventh Street (now Grant Avenue). The house fronted Broad Street, where his property spanned 918 ft (280 m). The property was deemed "Kelley's Folly" when purchased, as it was remote from most of Columbus at the time, and was mostly a wetland.

== History ==
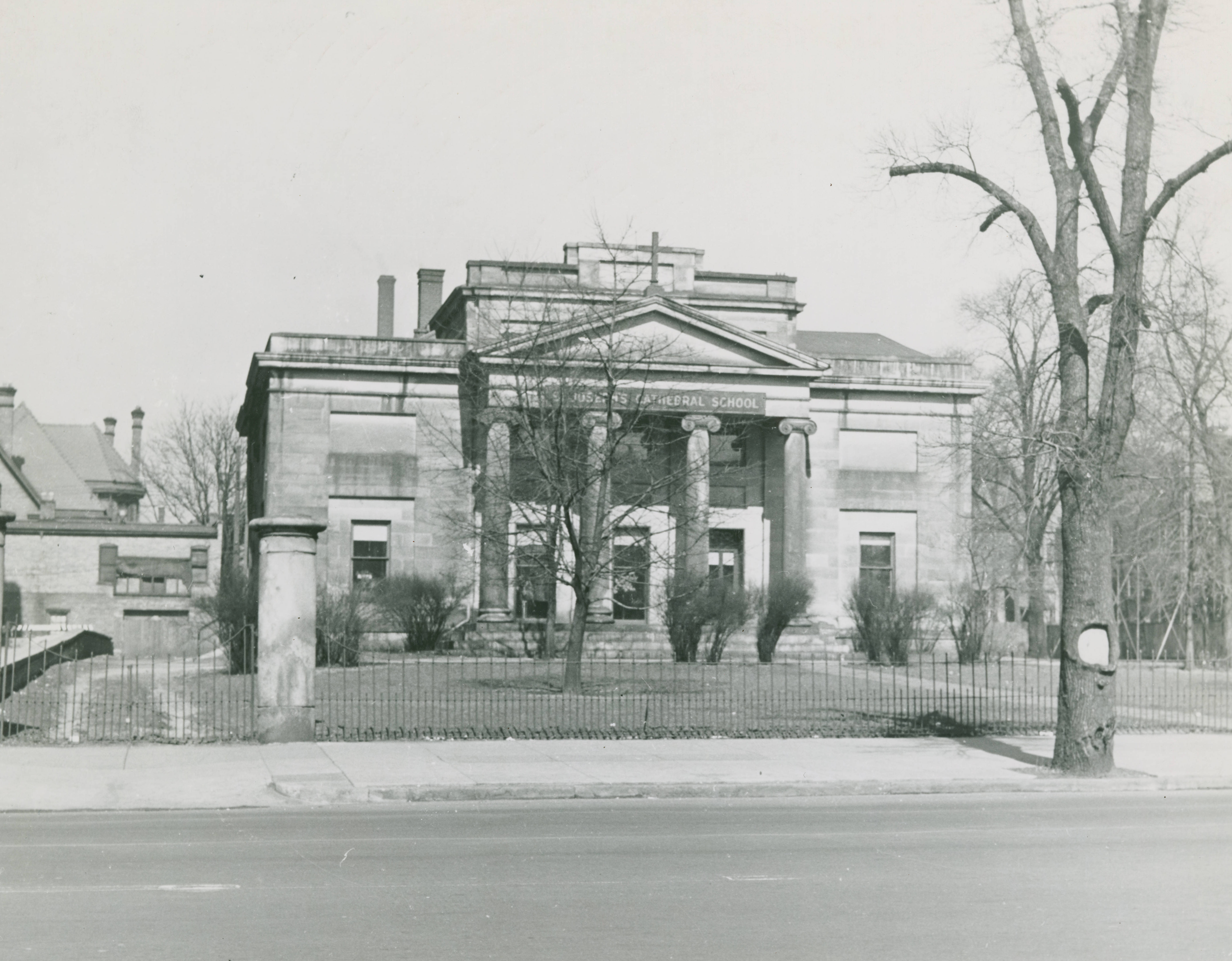
The house c. 1936-43

The mansion was built from 1835 or 1836 to 1838 for Alfred Kelley. Kelley was a notable politician and lawyer, responsible for the Ohio and Erie Canal and Cleveland, Columbus and Cincinnati Railroad. The house cost a reported $15,000 ($426,838 in 2025) to construct, and involved transporting stone via flatboats. The house was constructed on a property with plenty of marshland, so Kelley, a self-made engineer and architect, designed a drainage system there. This included a large vaulted tunnel from the house's cellar to Fifth Street. The work may have delayed the house's construction, which began in 1836 and was completed in June 1838.

At the time of construction, it was the most ornate house in the city, and built in the Greek Revival style at the height of its popularity. The Columbus Dispatch called it the "first pretentious house built in Columbus". In June 1838, the Kelley family moved in; Kelley lived there until his death 21 years later. During the Canal Fund financial crisis in 1842, Kelley pledged his property, including the mansion, to save Ohio from bankruptcy. Until 1859, the house served numerous hospitality functions for state and local leaders. Shortly before Kelley's death, he made several changes to the house, including the construction of ells at its rear.

It served as the governor's mansion for James E. Campbell, from 1890 to 1892; meanwhile Kelley's widow and son maintained it until 1906. The son, Alfred Kelley II, moved in with his wife in 1876 and lived there until 1906. In 1907 the Roman Catholic Diocese of Columbus purchased the building, and it became the parochial school for St. Joseph Cathedral. In 1949, the house was included in a tour of old, historic, and architecturally interesting houses in Columbus, sponsored by the Columbus Gallery of Fine Arts. The house was the starting point of the tour, noted as a fine and early example of Greek Revival architecture.

The Kelley mansion was abandoned around 1959, and vandals ruined much of its interior. Around 1960, the building and its land were sold to a developer who built the Christopher Inn, and the Kelley house was offered for free to anyone willing to move it. In March 1961, the Ohio Historical Society and Franklin County Historical Society joined up with the Columbus Gallery of Fine Arts to form the Kelley House Committee, Inc., a group of preservationists aiming to preserve the mansion. The Kelley House Committee attempted to raise $100,000 to save and move the house. Fundraising was not successful, and in August 1961, the preservation committee decided to dismantle the house and store the pieces until enough money could be raised. About 300 photographs were taken of the building, and measurements and drawings were taken for its 3,000 stone blocks. The house was taken down under supervision in September 1961.

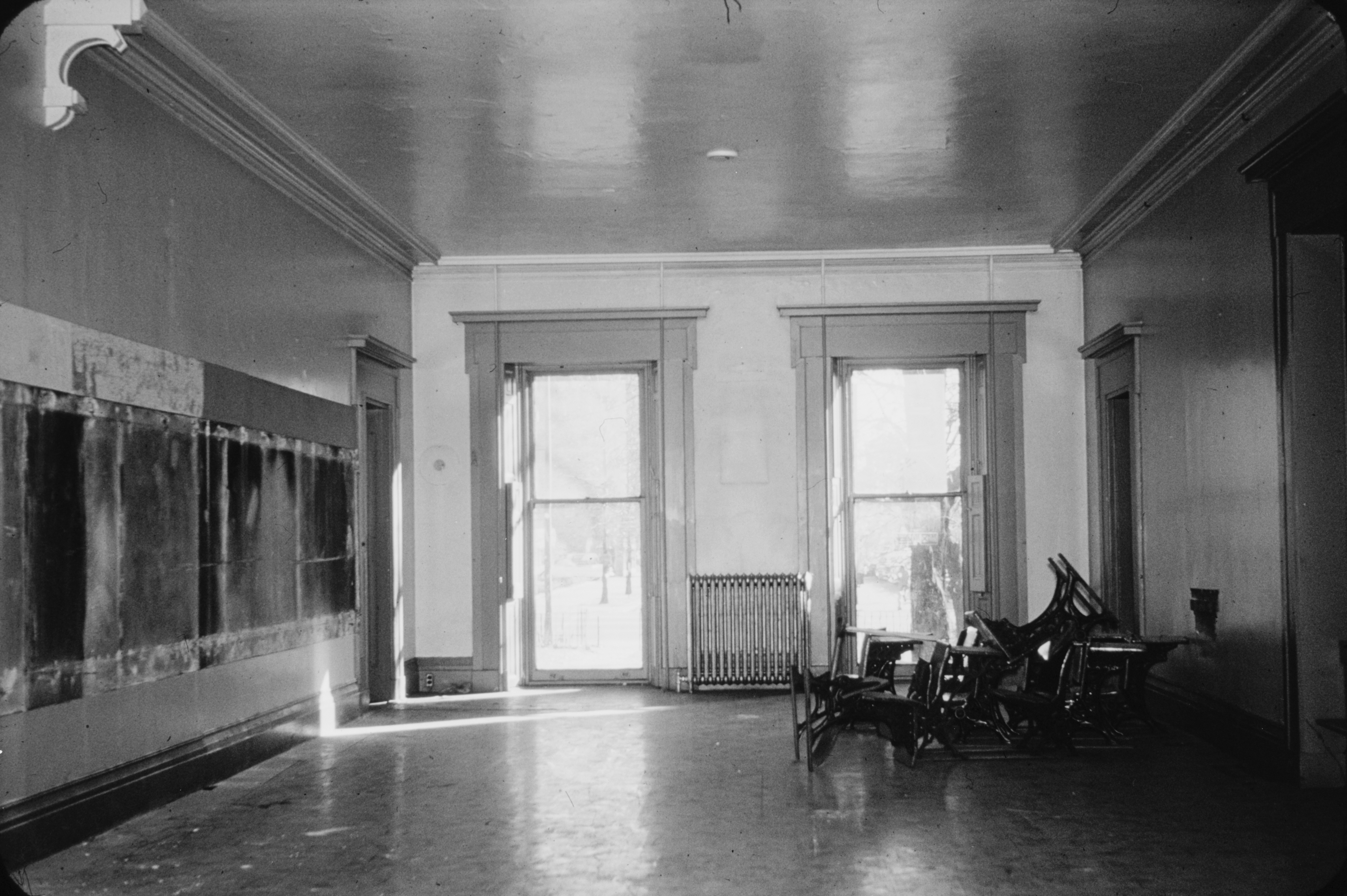
1958 view of a first-floor room, bare except for a pile of discarded desks

The committee asked for additional time on numerous occasions, and decided to move the stone blocks to Wolfe Park in Columbus, where the committee hoped to rebuild the house, creating a museum and memorial to Kelley. The large sandstone blocks remained in Wolfe Park for over four years when the city deemed them an eyesore; the committee still asked for more time. In 1966, the city ordered the stones to be removed, and so five truckloads of the mansion's stones were dumped on the banks of the Scioto Big Run at Big Run Park. After eight months, the stone blocks were moved to the Ohio State Fairgrounds, where it was proposed they could be used in the proposed Ohio Village. In 1971, after sitting in the fairgrounds parking lot for about four years, the Ohio Exposition Commission ordered the stones to be moved or buried. In 1972, the Ohio Historical Society nominated the ruins to the National Register of Historic Places, while noting that the disassembled house did not strictly comply with the register's criteria.

Around 1973, the Western Reserve Historical Society agreed to take the stones and place them in a field at their own historical village museum in Bath Township, near Akron. Around 1973, twenty truckloads of the mansion's stones were moved to the Hale Farm and Village. Many of the stones were missing or weathered; the markings for reassembly were worn off.

The initiative to save the Kelley Mansion failed, though it spurred many of the same preservationists to successfully save the Union Station arch several years later. The Christopher Inn was itself demolished in 1988, and is now the site of surface parking lots.

== See also ==
- List of demolished buildings and structures in Columbus, Ohio
