= Columbus State Hospital =

Psychiatric hospital in Columbus. Ohio

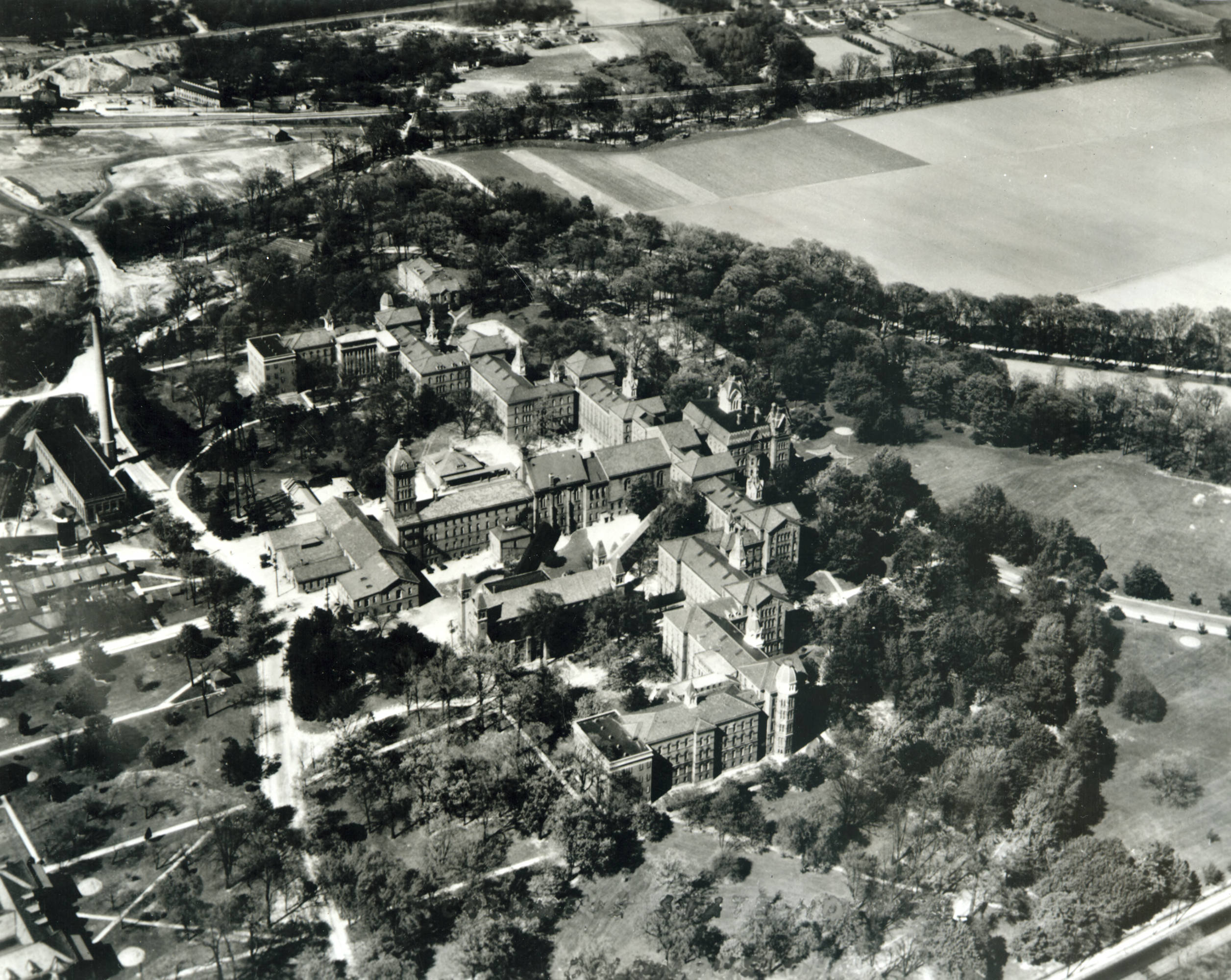
- 20th century aerial view of the hospital

Geography
- Location: 1960 West Broad St., Columbus, Ohio, United States
- Coordinates: 39°57′30″N 83°3′20″W

Organization
- Type: Specialist

Services
- Beds: 850 (1877)
- Speciality: Psychiatric hospital

History
- Founded: 1838
- Closed: late 1980s

Links
- Lists: Hospitals in Ohio
- Central Ohio Lunatic Asylum
- U.S. National Register of Historic Places
- NRHP reference No.: 86000851
- Added to NRHP: April 24, 1986

Columbus State Hospital, also known as the Ohio State Hospital for the Insane, was a public psychiatric hospital in Columbus, Ohio, founded in 1838 and rebuilt in 1877. The hospital was constructed under the Kirkbride Plan.

The building was said to have been the largest in the U.S. or the world, until the Pentagon was completed in 1943.

== History ==
The Lunatic Asylum of Ohio was initially organized by an act of the General Assembly passed on March 5, 1835. The original hospital building, after three years of construction, was completed in 1838 at a cost of about $61,000. Dr. William M. Awl was elected as the first Medical Superintendent of the asylum.

In November 1868, a fire destroyed the asylum, killing six patients and displacing over 300 others. The hospital was rebuilt in the Kirkbride style in 1877. The hospital was closed in the late 1980s, and was listed on the National Register of Historic Places in an attempt to save the building in 1986. The structure was nevertheless demolished between 1991 and 1996 by S.G. Loewendick & Sons.

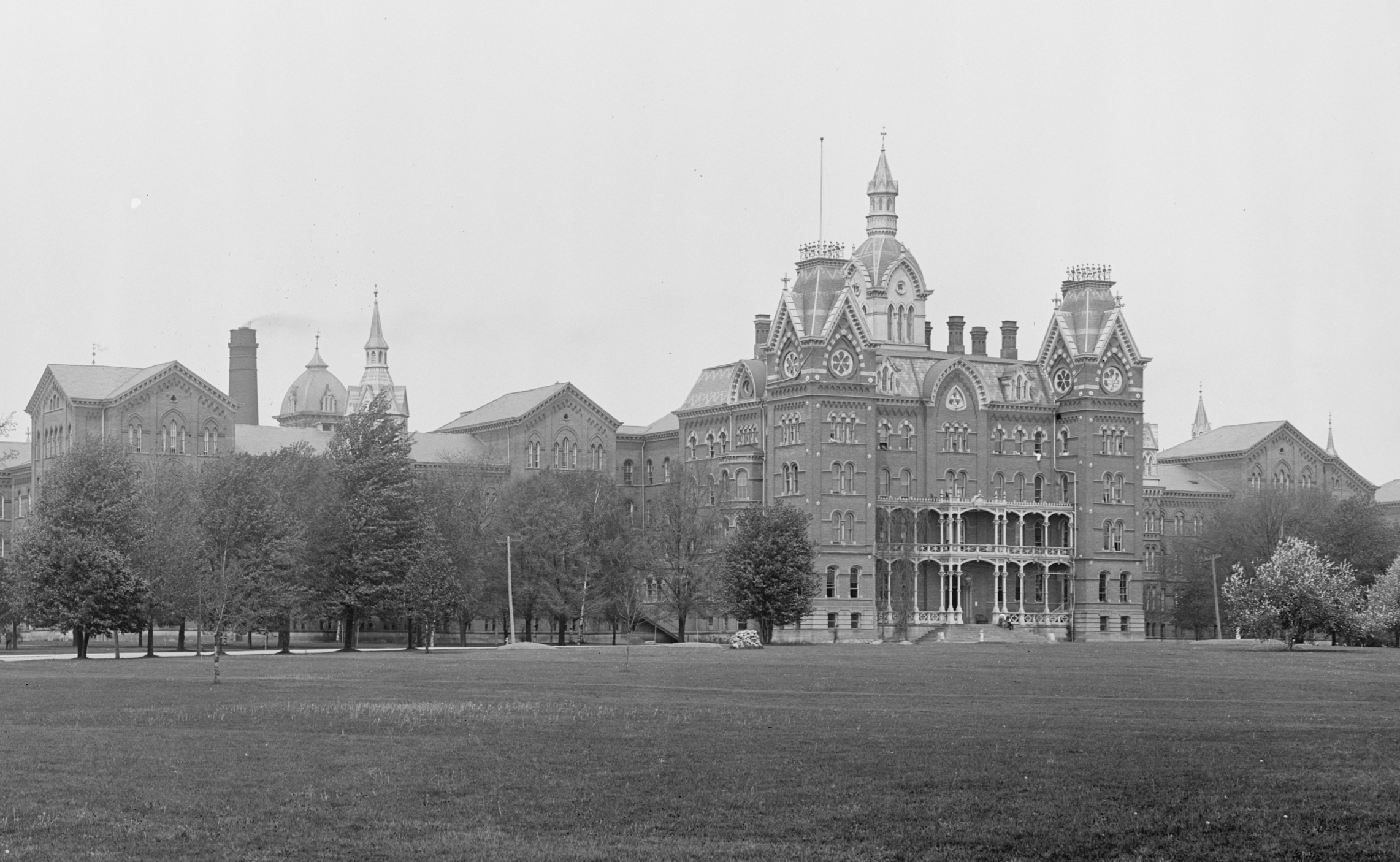
Main structure, c. 1900-1906

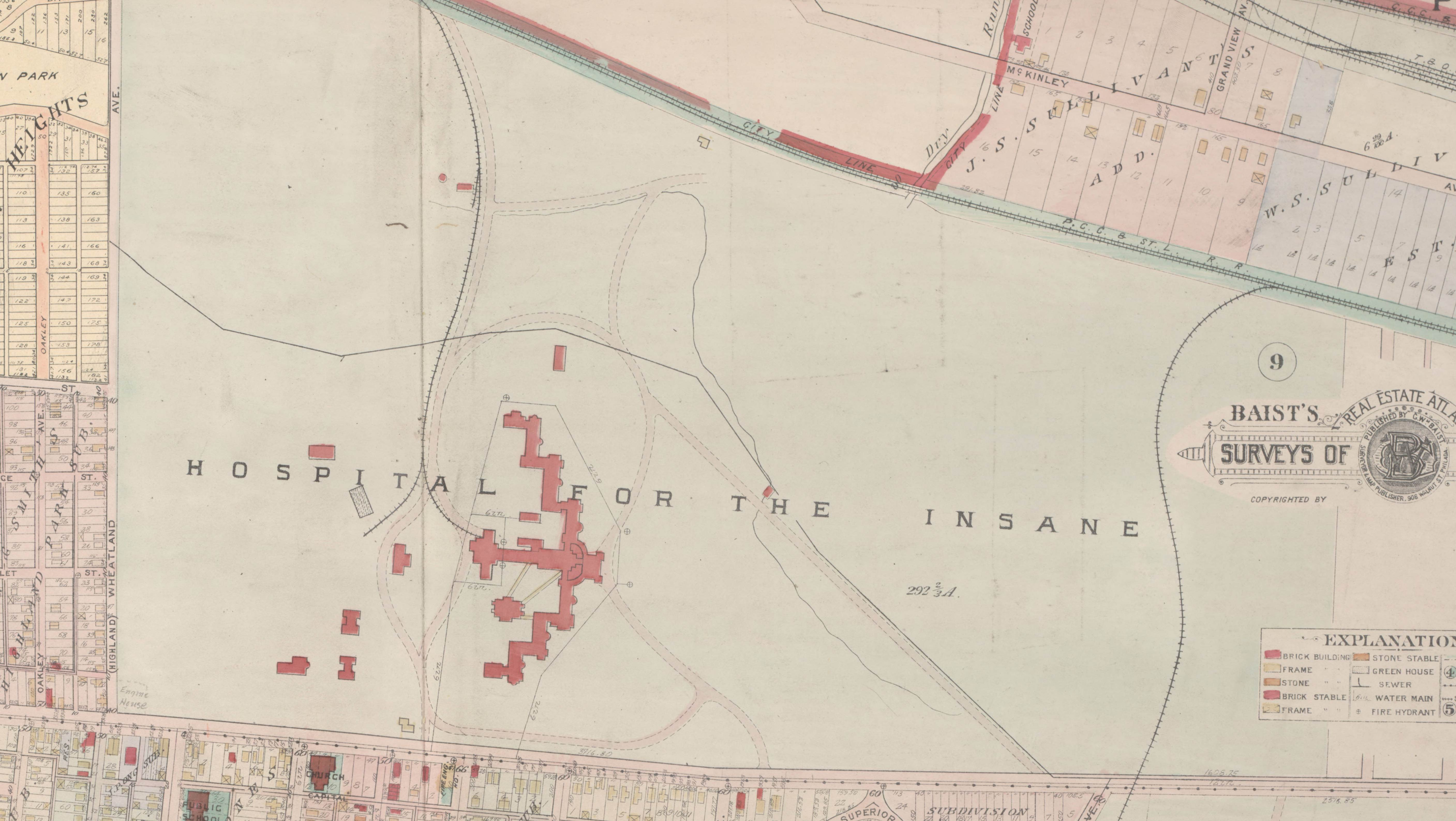
1910 property map

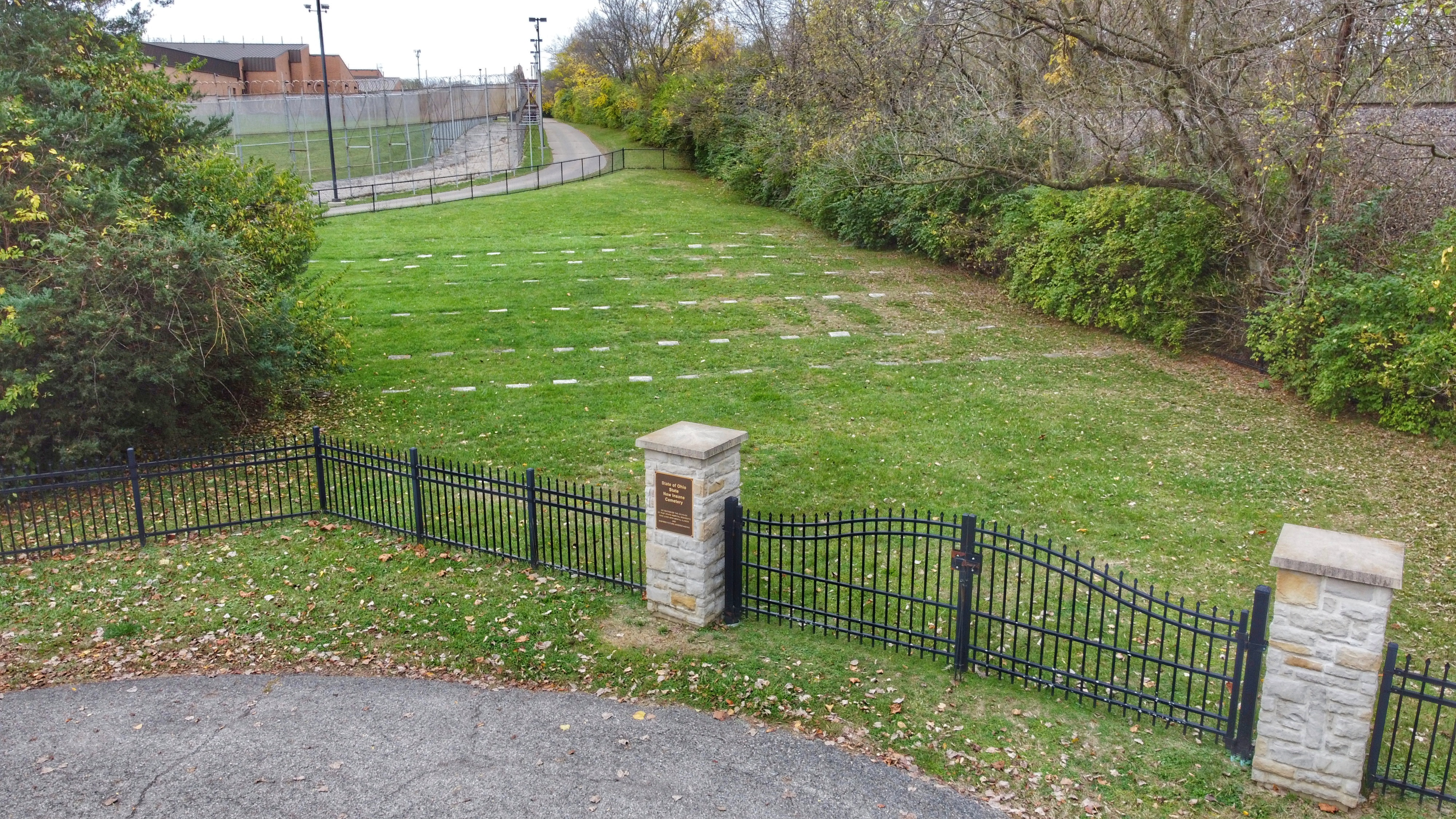
One of three cemeteries used by the asylum

== See also ==
- National Register of Historic Places listings in Columbus, Ohio
