= Christopher Inn =

Former hotel in Columbus, Ohio

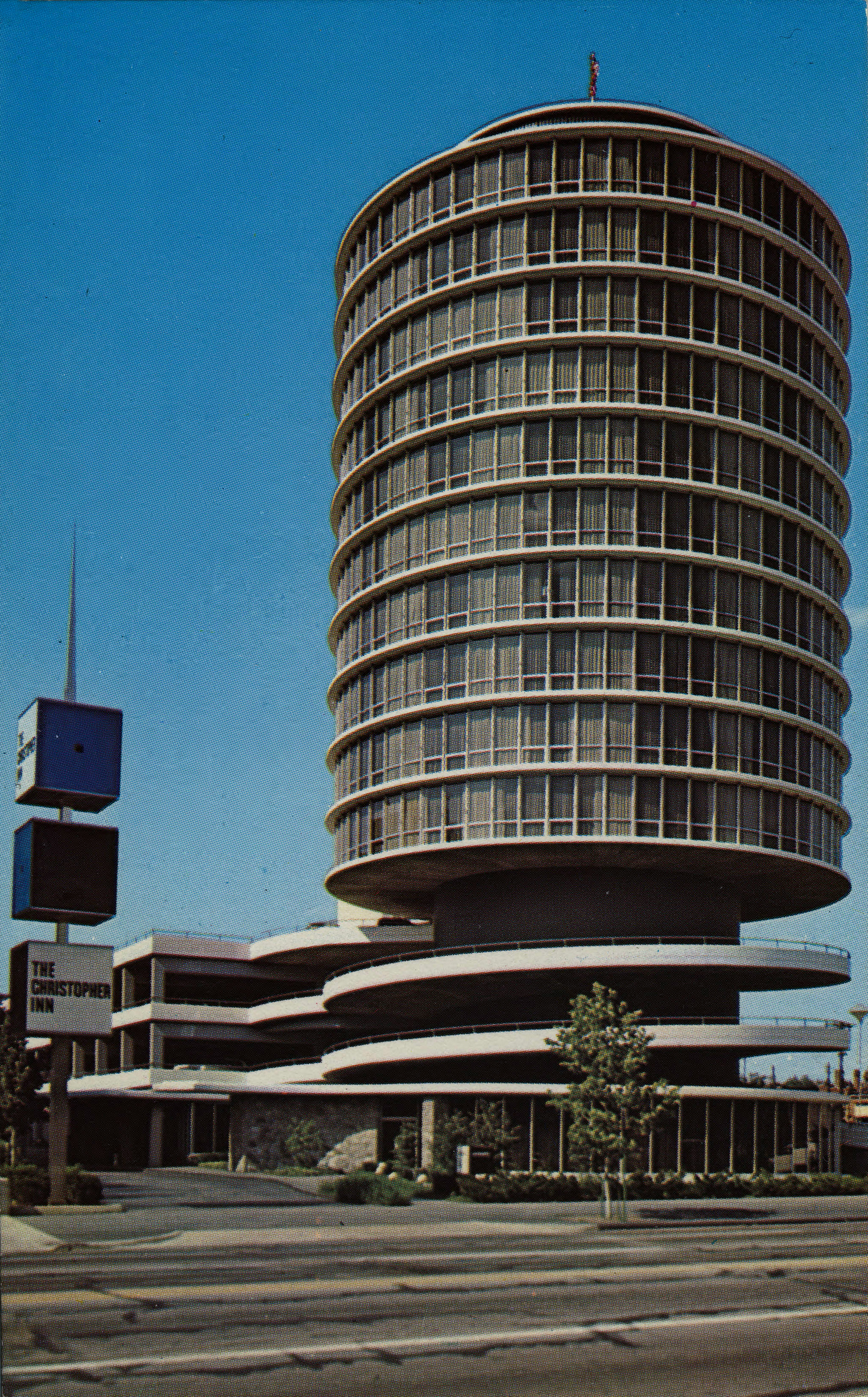
- Interactive map pinpointing the hotel's location

General information
- Architectural style: Mid-century modern
- Location: 300 East Broad Street, Columbus, Ohio
- Coordinates: 39.963505°N 82.992693°W
- Completed: 1963
- Opened: July 29, 1963
- Demolished: April–June 1988

Height
- Roof: 145 ft (44 m)

Technical details
- Floor count: 16

Design and construction
- Architecture firm: Karlsberger & Associates, Leon Ransom

Other information
- Number of rooms: 137

The Christopher Inn was a hotel in Downtown Columbus, Ohio. The cylindrical mid-century modern hotel had 16 floors, 137 wedge-shaped rooms, and modern interiors for its time. It was constructed on the site of the Alfred Kelley mansion, which was disassembled to make way for the new building. The Christopher Inn operated from 1963 to 1988, when it was demolished. The site is now occupied by an 11-story office building constructed in 2001.

== History ==
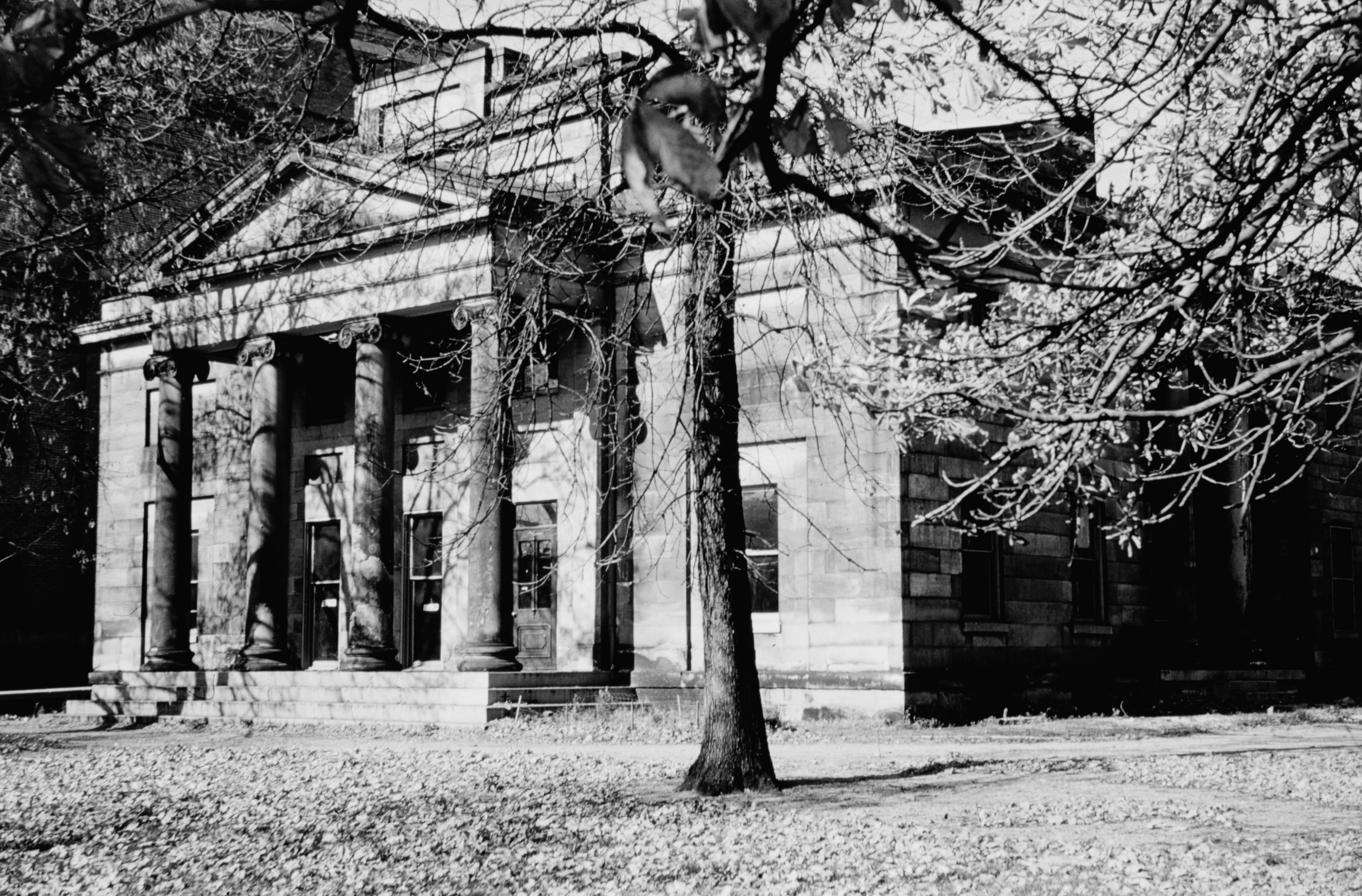
The Alfred Kelley mansion in 1958

The Christopher Inn was built on the site of the Alfred Kelley mansion. Built in 1838 and used as a parochial school for nearby St. Joseph Cathedral in the early 1900s, the mansion was demolished around 1961, and its remains were scattered throughout the Cuyahoga Valley National Park. By 1963, the Christopher Inn was completed on the site. At the time, it was one of the taller buildings in Columbus. The hotel's name referenced Saint Christopher, the patron saint of travelers. It was majority-owned developed by the Pontifical College Josephinum, a Catholic seminary in Columbus. The hotel opened on July 29, 1963; its general manager at opening was Henry I. Orringer. The building quickly became an icon of downtown Columbus.

In 1962, Columbus hotels invested about $5 million in upgrades to décor, air conditioning, and other improvements. These renovations were made in anticipation of competition from the Christopher Inn and the new Columbus Plaza Hotel, both of which opened in 1963.

By 1986, the hotel had gone through several ownership changes and proposals for updates or expansions, including a space needle and a rotating restaurant. By the 1980s, newer high-rises dwarfed the Christopher Inn, and its size was insufficient for the growing crowds in Columbus. It went into foreclosure and was sold at a sheriff's sale in February 1988. Demolition took place from April to June of that year, and the site became a parking lot, now used by the School Employees Retirement System. S.G. Loewendick & Sons, responsible for demolishing many Columbus landmarks, carried out the demolition.

In January 2020, it was reported that a former member of Karlsberger & Associates wanted to rebuild the hotel. Clyde Gosnell, who worked on the original project in the 1960s, began developing new drawings to recreate it using modern technology. The original drawings are held by the Ohio History Connection, which received them in 1985 along with design documents for 54 other projects.

== Attributes and design ==
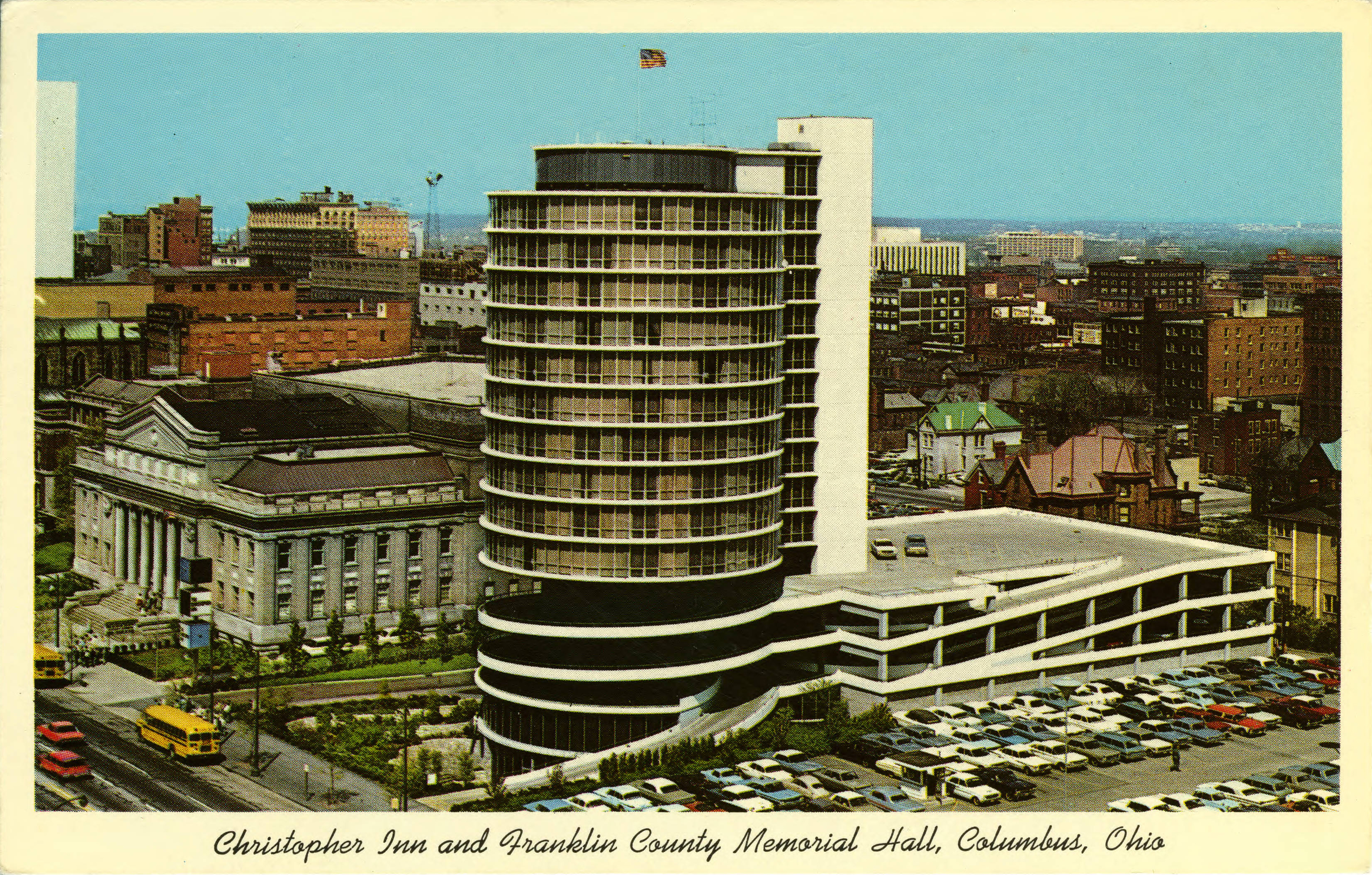
The Christopher Inn and Memorial Hall on Broad Street

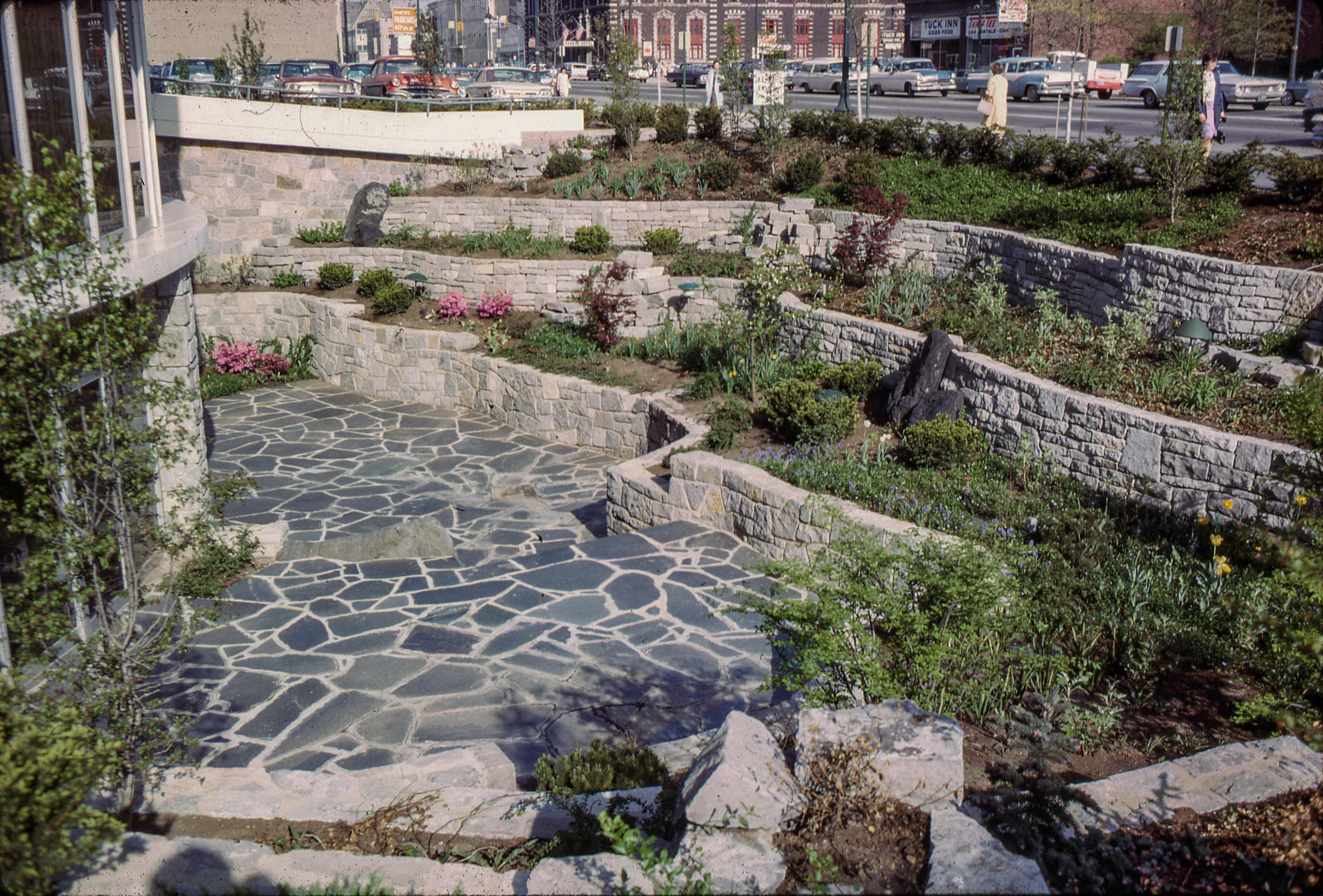
The hotel's stone patio

The Christopher Inn was designed by Karlsberger & Associates, along with Leon Ransom, the first known African American architect of prominence in Columbus. The cylindrical hotel, representative of the mid-century modern style, featured a simple design, ample use of glass, and open interiors. It was considered a motor inn due to its size and the parking located beneath the hotel. The building had 16 floors and 137 pie-slice-shaped rooms, with a heated pool. The structure used 710 glass panels throughout.

The hotel was located next to Franklin County Memorial Hall, which became the Center of Science and Industry (COSI) in 1964. Nearby were the Midland Building and, across the street, the original Wendy's restaurant—today the home of the Catholic Foundation of the Diocese of Columbus and the Museum of Catholic Art and History.

The hotel's interior was considered modern when it opened in 1963 but had become dated by 1977. Custom furniture was made to fit the uniquely shaped rooms, each featuring floor-to-ceiling glass walls with panoramic views of downtown Columbus. Rough stone walls adorned the lower levels, and free-hanging staircases were carpeted in red and gold. The lobby offered a wide view of Broad Street, and the mezzanine overlooked a 36-foot (11 m) circular pool and landscaped stone terrace. The hotel’s restaurant, Henry’s, was described as "stylish and modern."

== See also ==
- List of demolished buildings and structures in Columbus, Ohio
- Renaissance Columbus Downtown Hotel, built nearby at the same time
