= Franklin County Memorial Hall =

Multi-use building in Columbus, Ohio

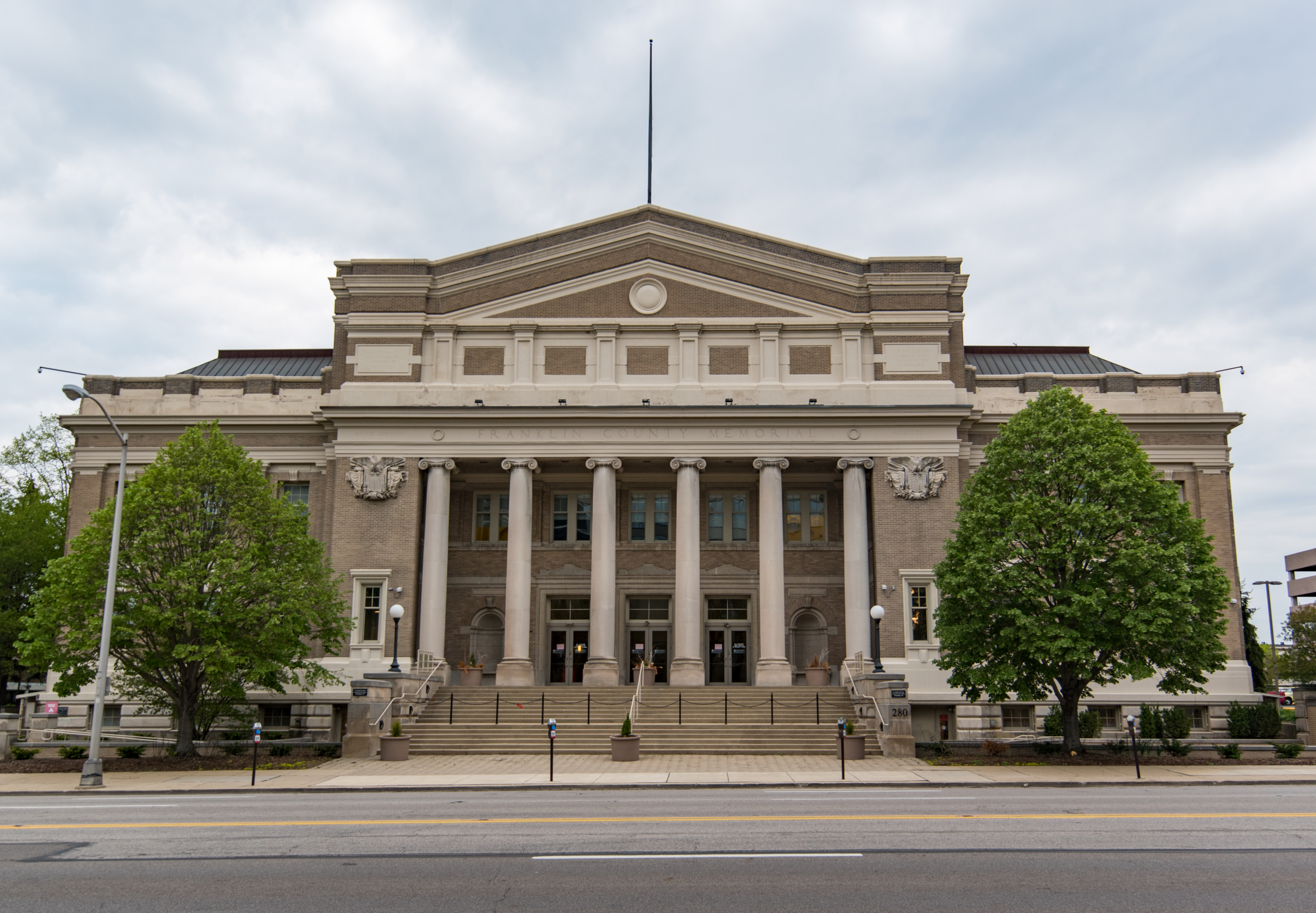
- Interactive map of Franklin County Memorial Hall
- Address: 280 E Broad St., Columbus, Ohio
- Coordinates: 39°57′49.1″N 82°59′36.0″W
- Capacity: 4,200
- Type: Multi-use facility
- Public transit: 10

Construction
- Built: 1906
- Architect: Frank Packard

Franklin County Memorial Hall, also known simply as Memorial Hall, is an office building, multi-use facility, and memorial for war dead in Downtown Columbus, Ohio. The building is best-known today as the headquarters of Franklin County Public Health.

== Uses ==
The building currently holds the offices of Franklin County Public Health (the county's health department), Franklin County Veterans Services, and still retains a war memorial. The building was built from 1905 to 1906 by local architect Frank Packard. The building features a 4,200-seat auditorium, which was the second largest in the United States behind Madison Square Gardens when it was completed. The building has been used to host a variety of events:

- Musical events that included Rudolph Valentino, Paul Whitman and the Vienna Boys Choir
- Large church events
- Speaking events for William Jennings Brian, Homer Rodeheaver and DeWolfe Hopper
- Sporting events
- High school graduations
- Political and religious debates
- Columbus Philharmonic Orchestra (1941-1949)
- Radio shows in the early 20th century

It was home to the Franklin County Historical Society, which operated the Franklin County Museum of History here. The historical society also created the museum COSI (the Center of Science and Industry). COSI operated out of Memorial Hall from 1964 to 1999 before it relocated to its current space in Franklinton.

== Gallery ==
The building c. 1900-10

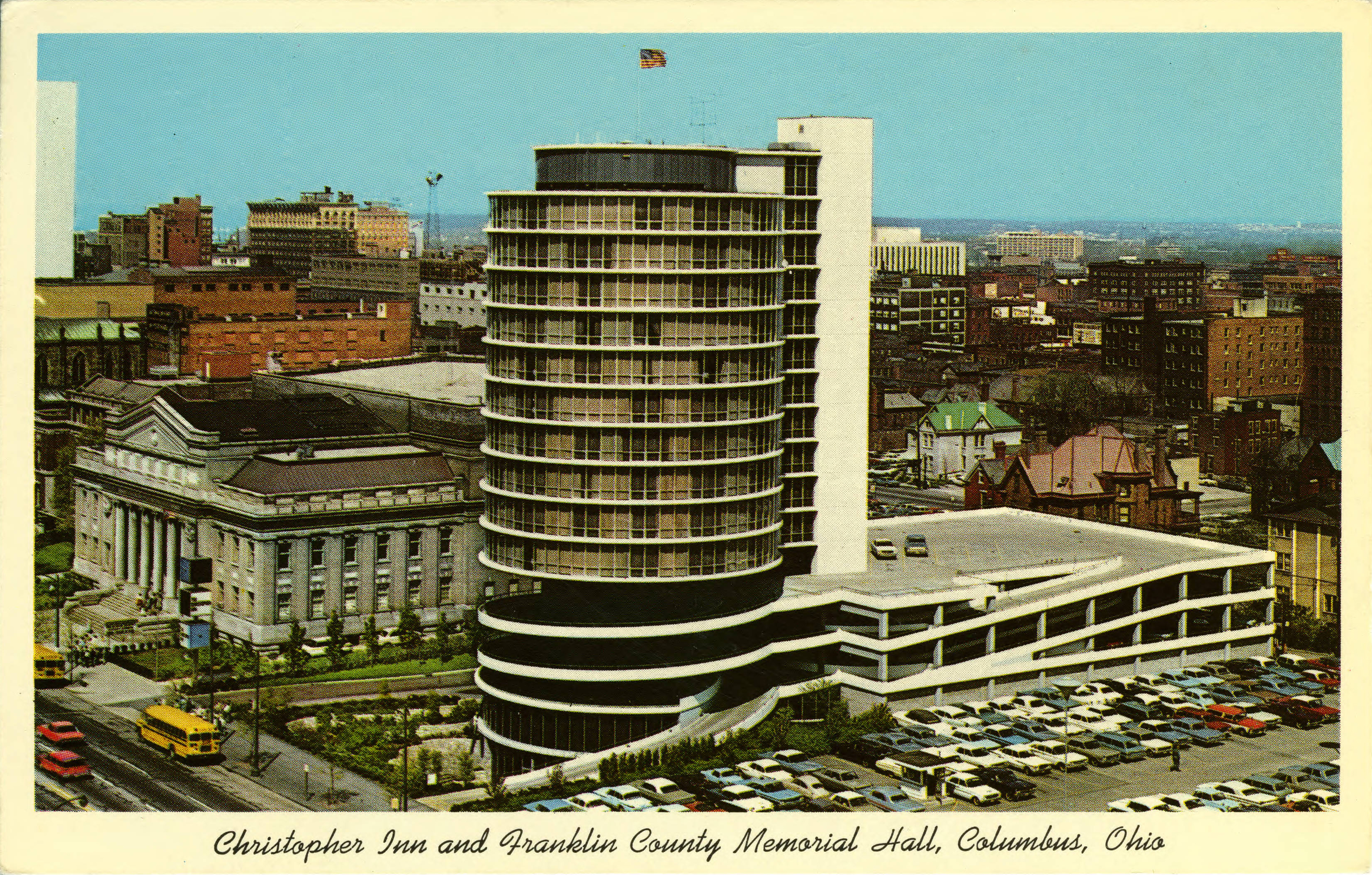
Memorial Hall and the Christopher Inn on Broad Street, c. 1963

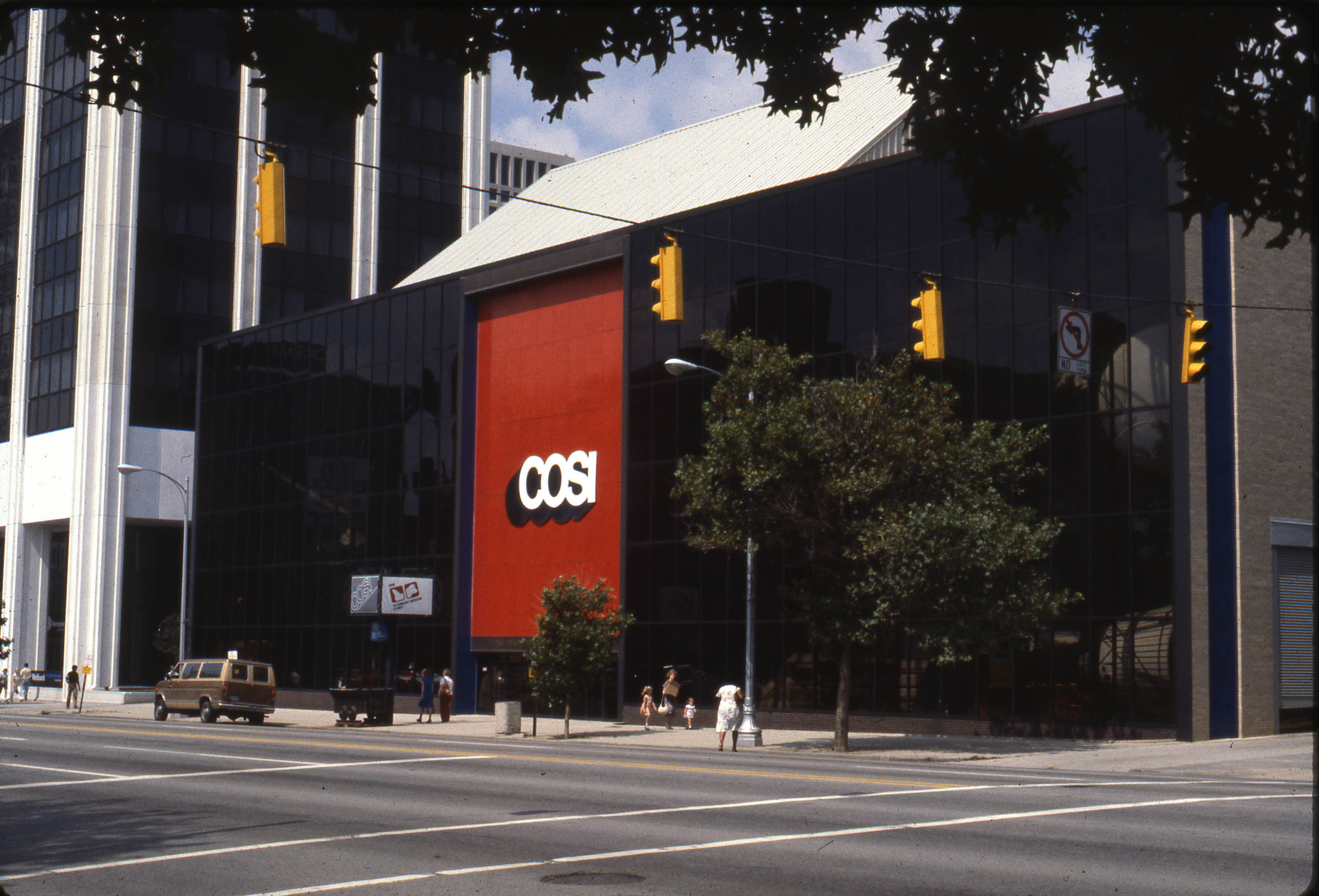
The building with a modern front while owned by COSI, 1986
