= Trautman Building =

Former building in Columbus, Ohio

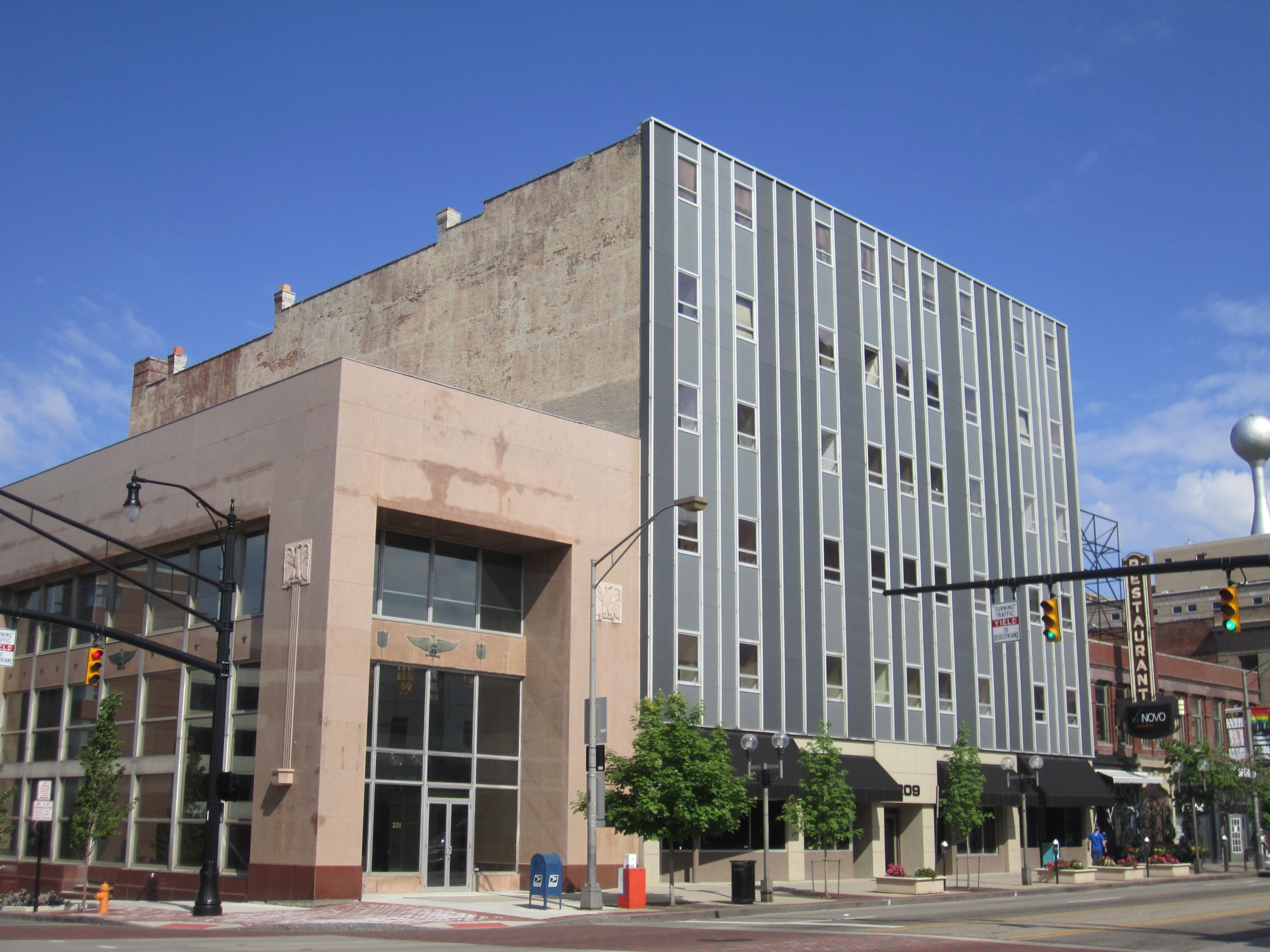
- The Trautman Building (right) beside the Hub Savings & Loan Building (left), 2013
- Site where the building stood
- Alternative names: Comstock Building

General information
- Type: Commercial
- Location: 209 or 203-213 S. High Street, Columbus, Ohio
- Coordinates: 39.957755°N 83.000091°W
- Completed: 1893
- Demolished: 2014

Technical details
- Floor area: 63,611 sq ft (5,909.7 m^{2})

The Trautman Building, previously known as the Comstock Building, was a five-story commercial building in the River South District of Downtown Columbus, Ohio. The structure was completed in 1893 and was owned by the Trautman family from 1945 to 2007. It served as a commercial building until 2008 and was demolished in 2014. It was replaced with a high-rise apartment building that year.

== History ==
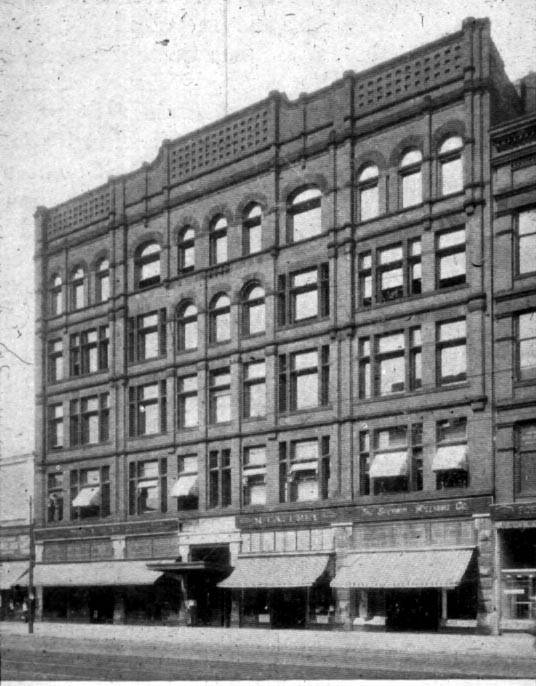
The building's original facade, 1919

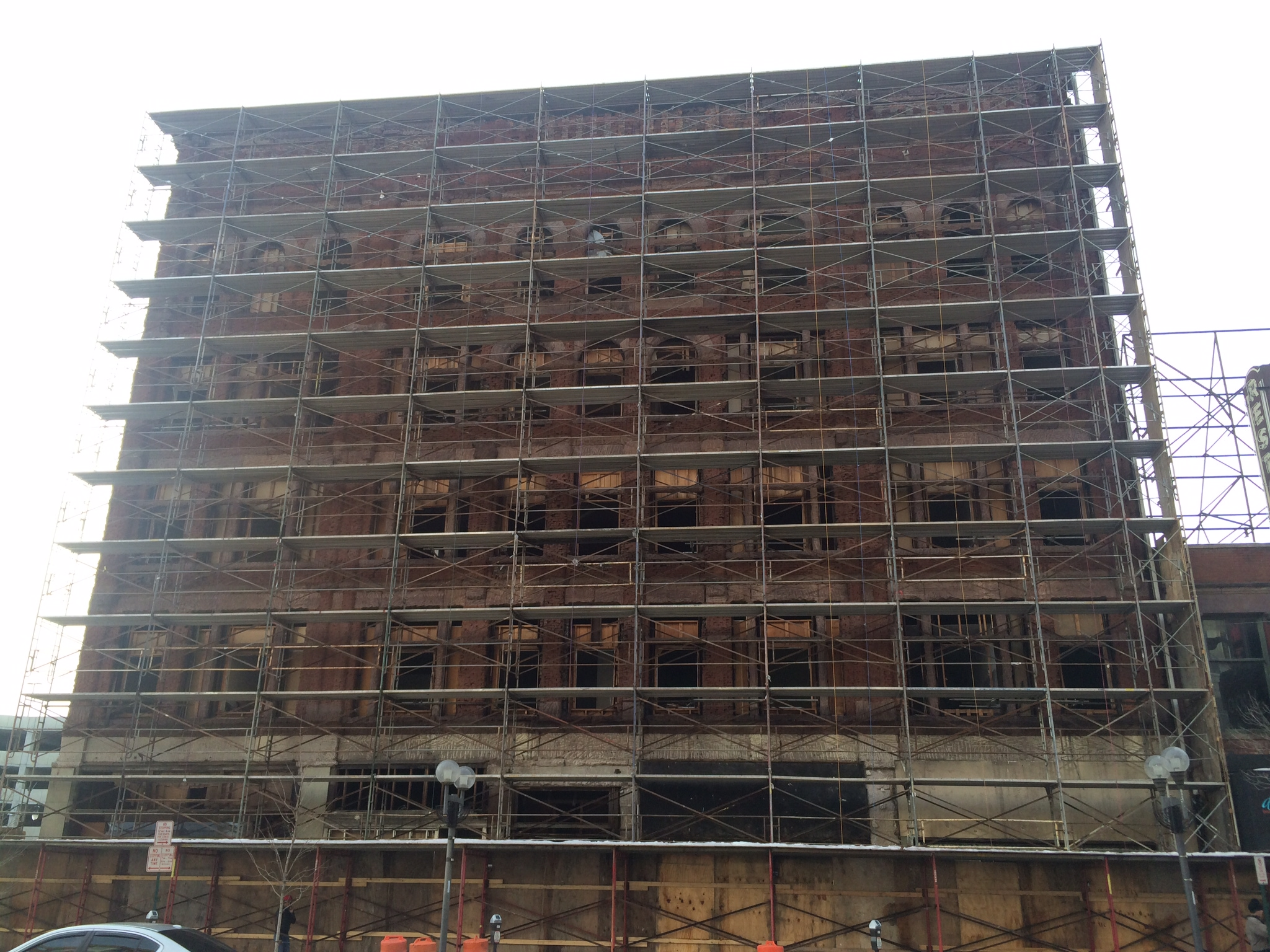
Remnants of the original facade revealed in 2014

The site of the building previously housed the Metropolitan Opera House (also called the Cotton Block or Comstock's Opera House), a large brick building built in 1862. The building burned down in a fire in 1892.

The Trautman Building, first known as the Comstock Building, was constructed in 1893. The Trautman family bought it in 1945. It was renovated in 1964, with a major change to its facade, adding a modern slipcover over it. The family sold the building to the Columbus Downtown Development Corporation in April 2007.

In 2007, the building was envisioned for a live/work space for artists, assessed by Artspace Projects. Around 2008, Lifestyle Communities purchased the building along with the neighboring Hub Savings & Loan Building at 221 S. High at a price of $750,000. The prior owner, the Columbus Downtown Development Corp., had purchased them for a combined $3.3 million. The building's 31 tenants were abruptly forced out that year, with 50 days' notice, leaving it vacant until demolition. The nonprofit development company sought another developer willing to renovate it into residential units and first-floor retail space. The company believed it would not qualify for historic-site tax credits, and would demolish it if renovators were not found.

In 2012, amid planned demolition, the Columbus Landmarks Foundation sought a stay on demolition for the building and the Hub Savings & Loan Building. The foundation asked for the 1960s facade to be removed, to assess the condition of the original facade, as well as an independent reuse assessment and for the proposed project's details to be finalized before demolition.

Columbus City Council approved the demolition project in November 2013. In 2014, LC contracted S.G. Loewendick & Sons to demolish the Trautman Building, the Hub Savings & Loan Building, and other surrounding buildings. LC sought about $1 million for removal of asbestos and other hazardous wastes. LC RiverSouth, an eight-story apartment complex, now stands on its site and blocks nearby. The replacement building is sometimes also known as the Trautman Building.

== Attributes ==
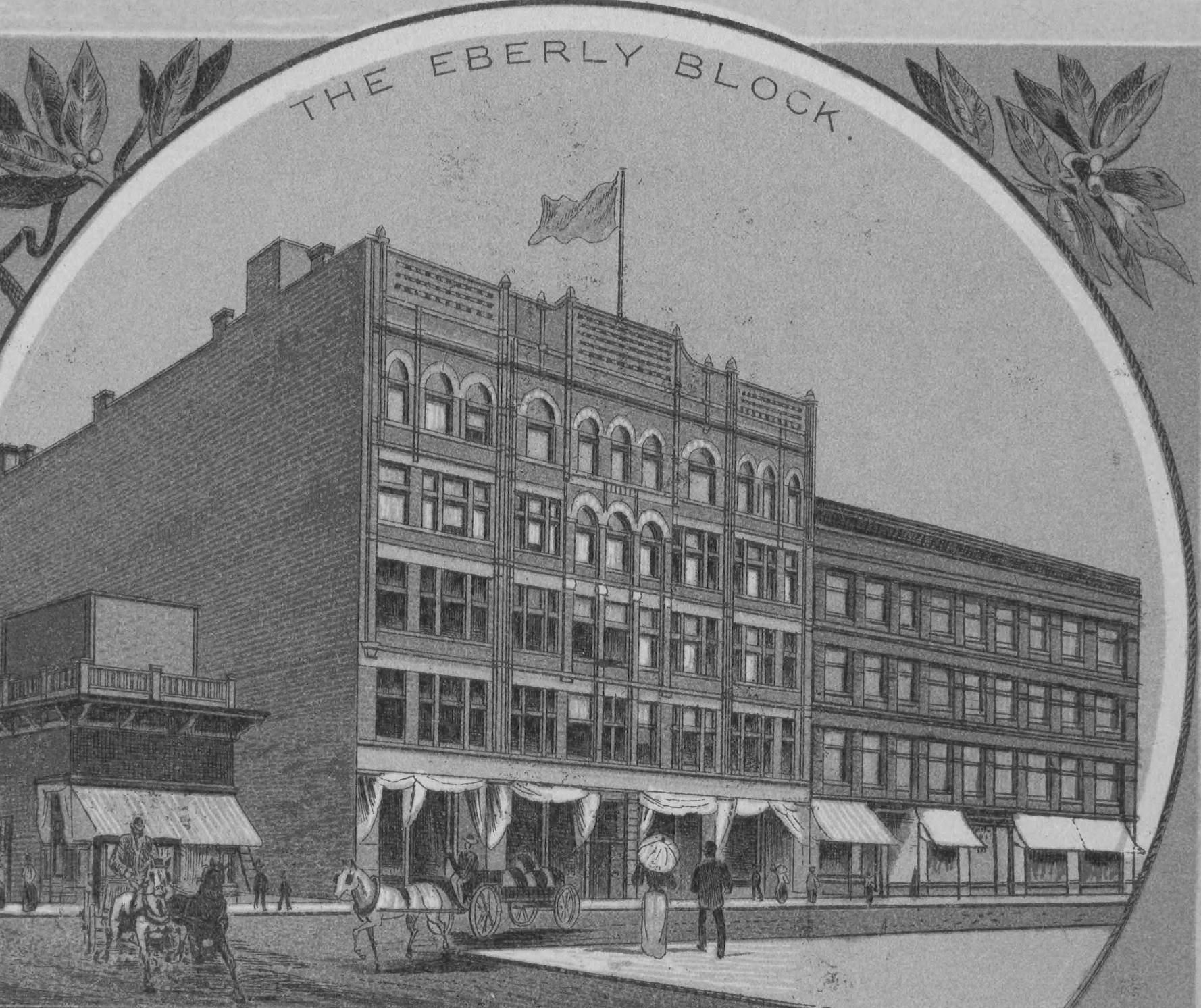
Illustration from 1893

The Trautman Building had five stories and 63,611 sq ft (5,909.7 m^{2}). It had two three-story annexes behind it, appearing to be as old as the main building. The building had tall ceilings of 10–11 feet as well as large front windows, both cited as benefits for reuse.

The building featured a 3-x-25 ft. panoramic mural, painted by local artist Sara Carr in 1960 at the request of Warner Trautman. The mural, Columbus on a Summer Morning, showed the view from the roof of the building at the time. Carr leased an art studio in the building, and painted the mural in return for the use of a rural cottage Trautman owned. The mural was reported as at risk in 2008, when the building was planned to be demolished.
