= Renaissance Columbus Downtown Hotel =

Hotel on Columbus, Ohio, US

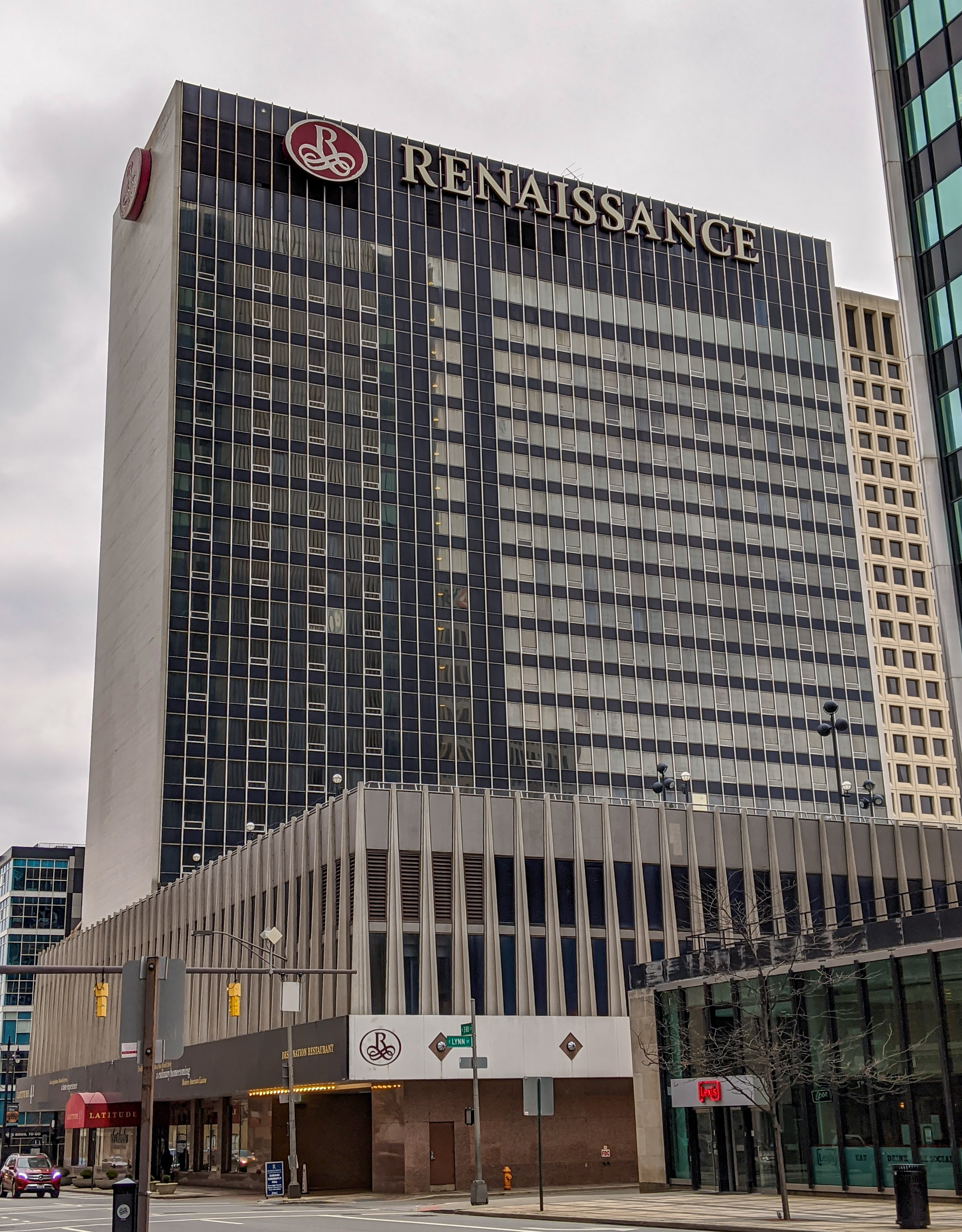
- Interactive map of the Renaissance Columbus Downtown Hotel area
- Former names: Columbus Plaza Hotel, Sheraton Columbus Hotel, Adam's Mark Columbus
- Hotel chain: Renaissance Hotels

General information
- Architectural style: International style
- Location: 50 N. Third Street, Columbus, Ohio
- Coordinates: 39.963555°N 82.997704°W
- Opened: November 18, 1963

Height
- Height: 244 ft

Technical details
- Floor count: 22

Design and construction
- Architecture firm: Kellam & Foley

Other information
- Public transit access: 3, 6, 8, 10, 51, 52, 61, 71, 72, 73, 74, 75, Zoo Bus

The Renaissance Columbus Downtown Hotel is a Renaissance Hotel in Downtown Columbus, Ohio. The hotel has 22 stories, and was designed by Columbus architects Kellam & Foley in the International style.

The building was built on the site of the Virginia Hotel and Columbus Citizen building, both demolished in 1961 to make room for the new hotel. It opened as the Columbus Plaza Hotel in 1963, and became a Sheraton Hotel in 1965, operating until 1987. Numerous plans fell through, and the hotel remained vacant for about a decade. In 1997, it reopened as the Adam's Mark, after extensive renovations. The hotel remained open during a 2005-2006 renovation, converting it into a Marriott Renaissance hotel.

== Attributes ==
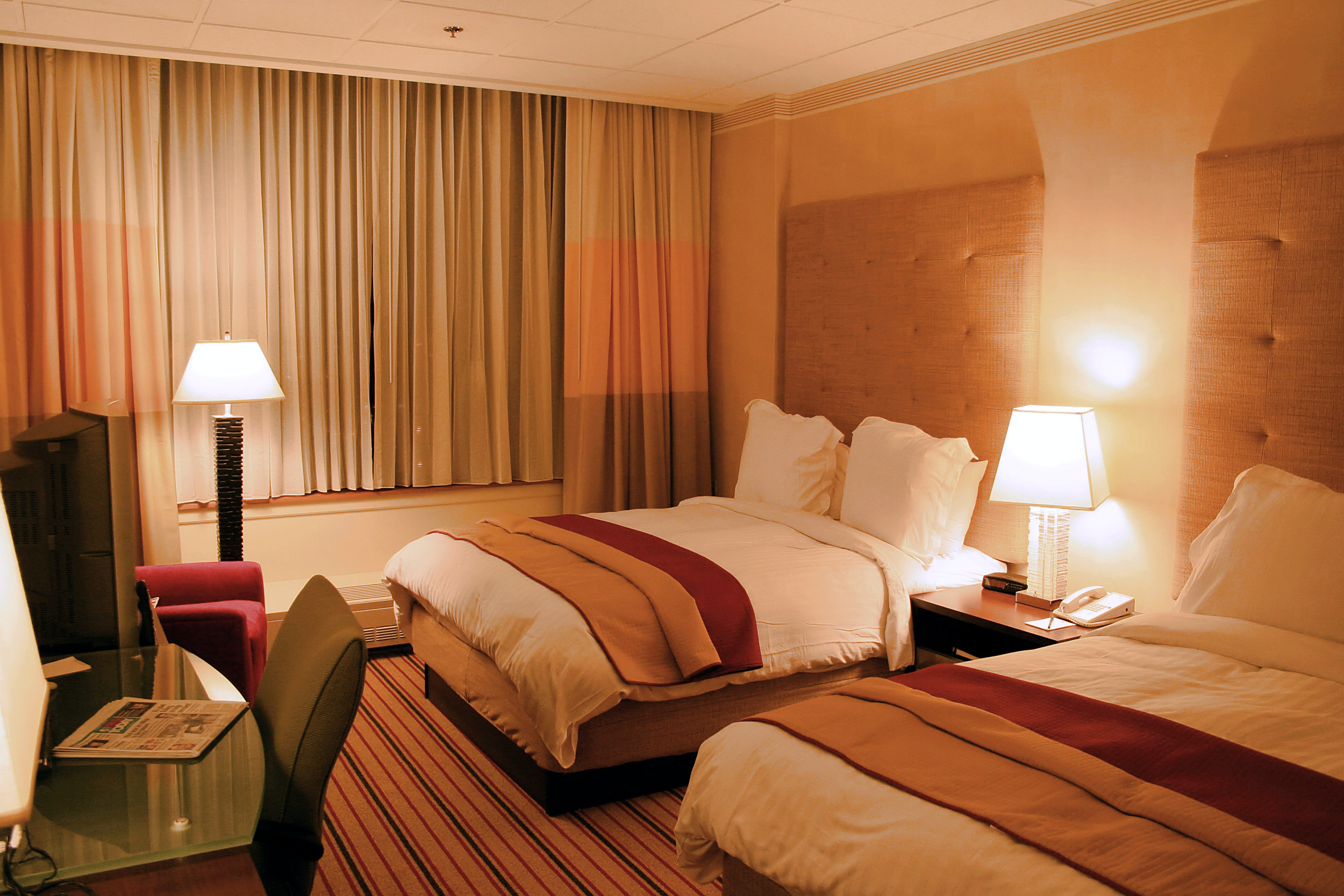
A guest room in 2006

The hotel is located in Downtown Columbus, Ohio, a half-block from the Ohio Statehouse on Capitol Square.

The hotel was originally designed as a motor hotel, with 20 stories, and a cost of $6 million. The motel was expected to begin operation in early 1963. It would have seven parking levels comprising three stories, built below the hotel and ground.

The motel was originally proposed to have the luxuries of a hotel but the conveniences of a motel. It would have as many self-service elements as possible, including self-parking, and rooms with vending machines for soft drinks, coffee, and cigarettes. Guests would check into the hotel, seen via closed circuit television cameras and receive keys via pneumatic tubes. Tipping would be discouraged.

The hotel's swimming pool was designed to sit atop a large two-story portion of the building, partly cantilevering over city sidewalks. The outdoor pool was to have a large semi-spheric inflated cover to allow for its use in cold months.

Kellam & Foley, a local architecture firm, was hired to design the building.

== History ==
=== Prior buildings on-site ===
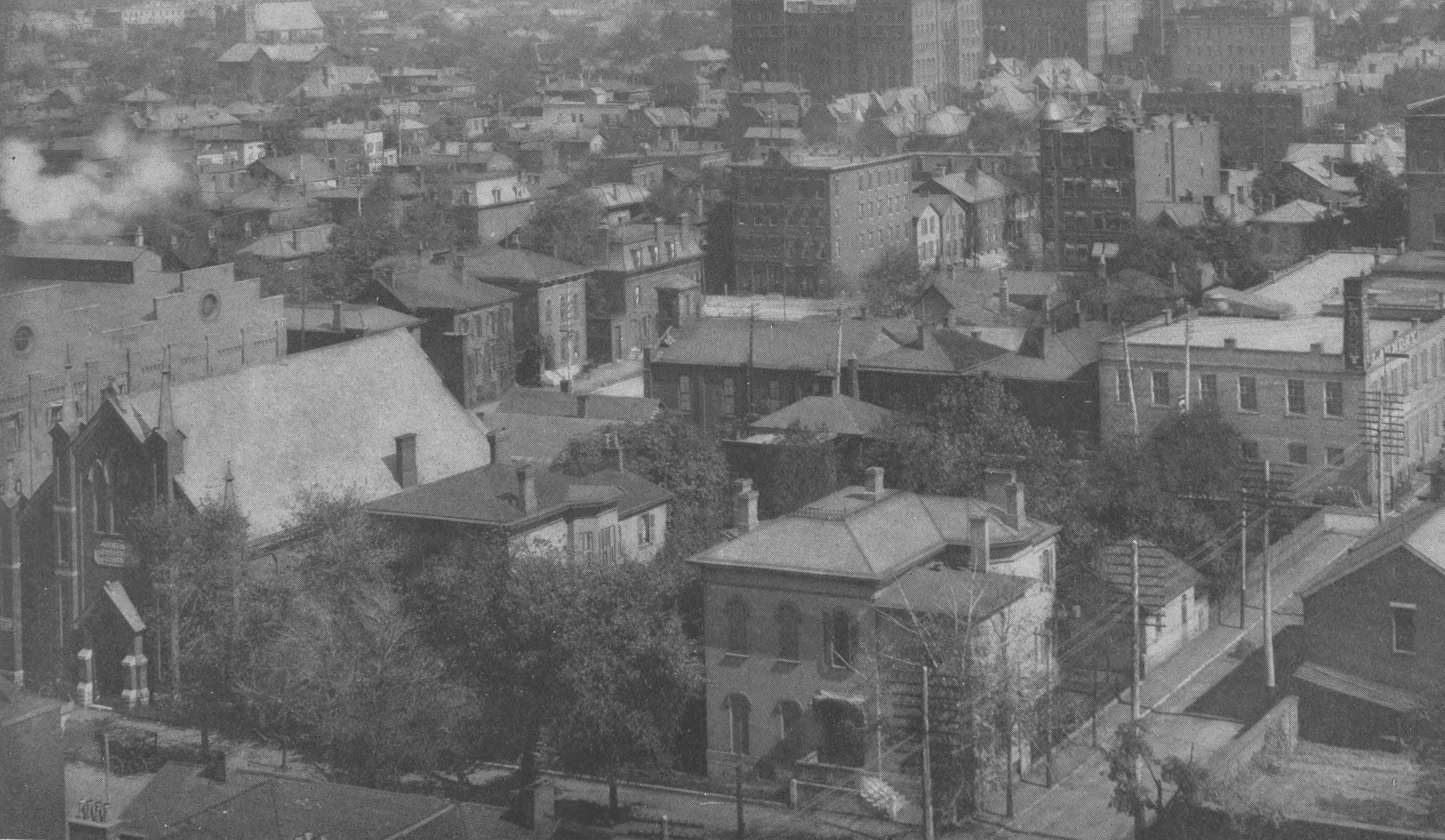
Hotel site in 1910: the Central Christian Church and residences

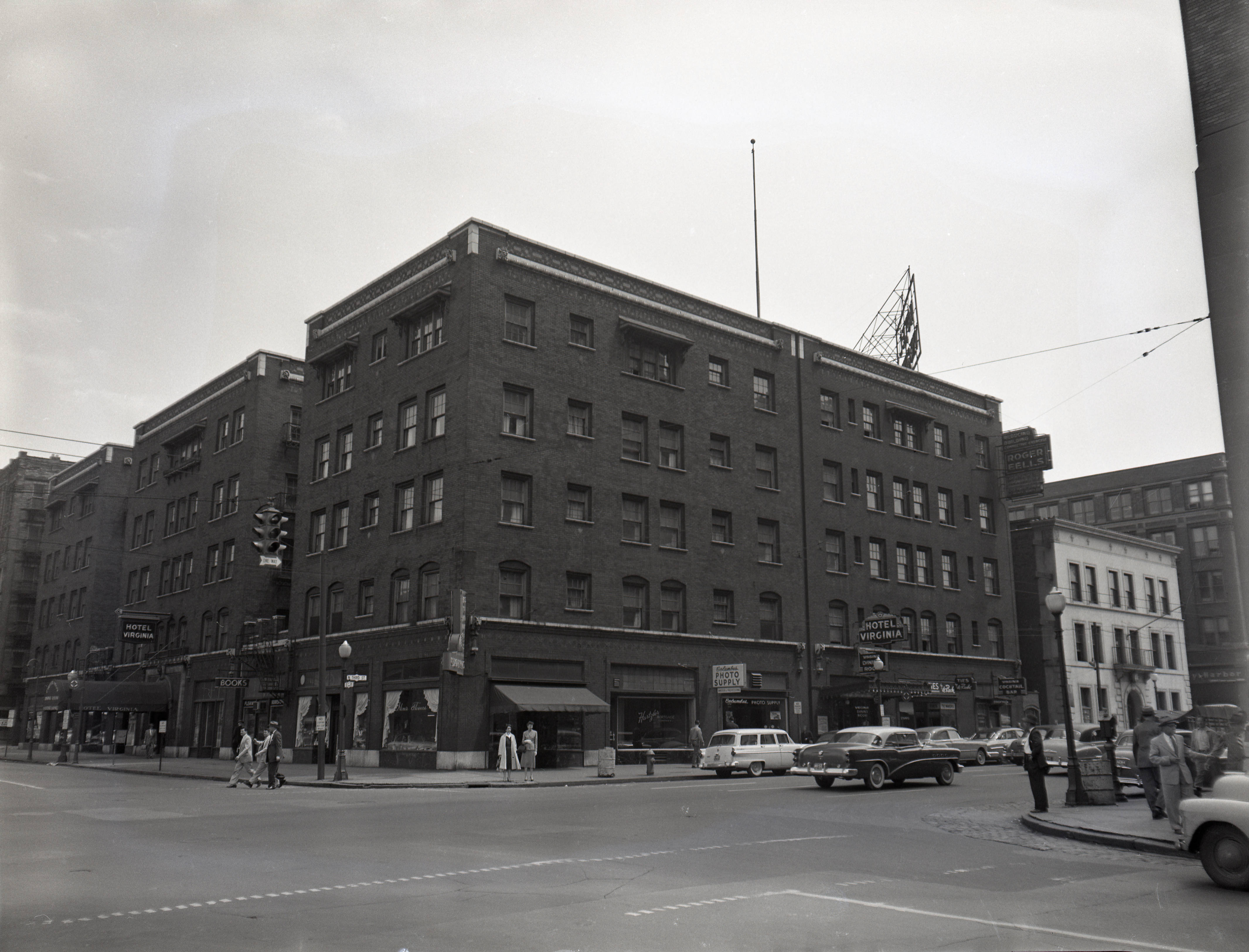
The Hotel Virginia and Columbus Citizen building, 1955

The hotel was built on the site of the Columbus Citizen building as well as the Virginia Hotel, also known as Hotel Virginia. The site held the Central Christian Church earlier on, beginning around 1873; the congregation moved to the Broad Street Christian Church in 1907, using the building until its dissolution in 2009. The Columbus Citizen building was in use until shortly before demolition, though The Columbus Citizen had merged with The Ohio State Journal to create The Columbus Citizen-Journal in 1959, and was no longer housed in the building.

The Virginia Hotel was initially designed as a "Bachelor's Hall", an apartment building for men, with 60 rooms, including 48 apartments. The ground floor was to a large cafe and storerooms. It was to be four stories tall, designed by Frank Packard and built for F. W. Schumacher, vice president of the Peruna Drug Company. Schumacher became a wealthy investor and patron of the Columbus Museum of Art. On May 24, 1908, the building opened as the Virginia Apartments, an apartment building with two floors exclusively for bachelors and one floor for families. Schumacher was married to Samuel B. Hartman's daughter, thus inheriting wealth, though he hoped for a fortune of his own. The hotel was his first investment property, named for one of his daughters.

In 1916, the Ohio Republican Party held its annual convention and rally at the Virginia, and endorsed Charles Evans Hughes as candidate for U.S. President. In 1924, the hotel also hosted the national convention of the Grand Army of the Republic and its auxiliary, the Woman's Relief Corps.

The hotel was purchased by the School Employees Retirement Board of Ohio (SERS) in January 1960, as an investment purchase. The board would contrinue the hotel's operation. By this point, the building had five stories, 150 rooms, and measured 127.5 ft by 187.5 ft. In April 1961, the board also purchased the Columbus Citizen building; the board planned to remove the building's equipment and raze it. It would operate a parking facility pending final plans of a multi-story motel with self-parking facilities.

=== Current building ===
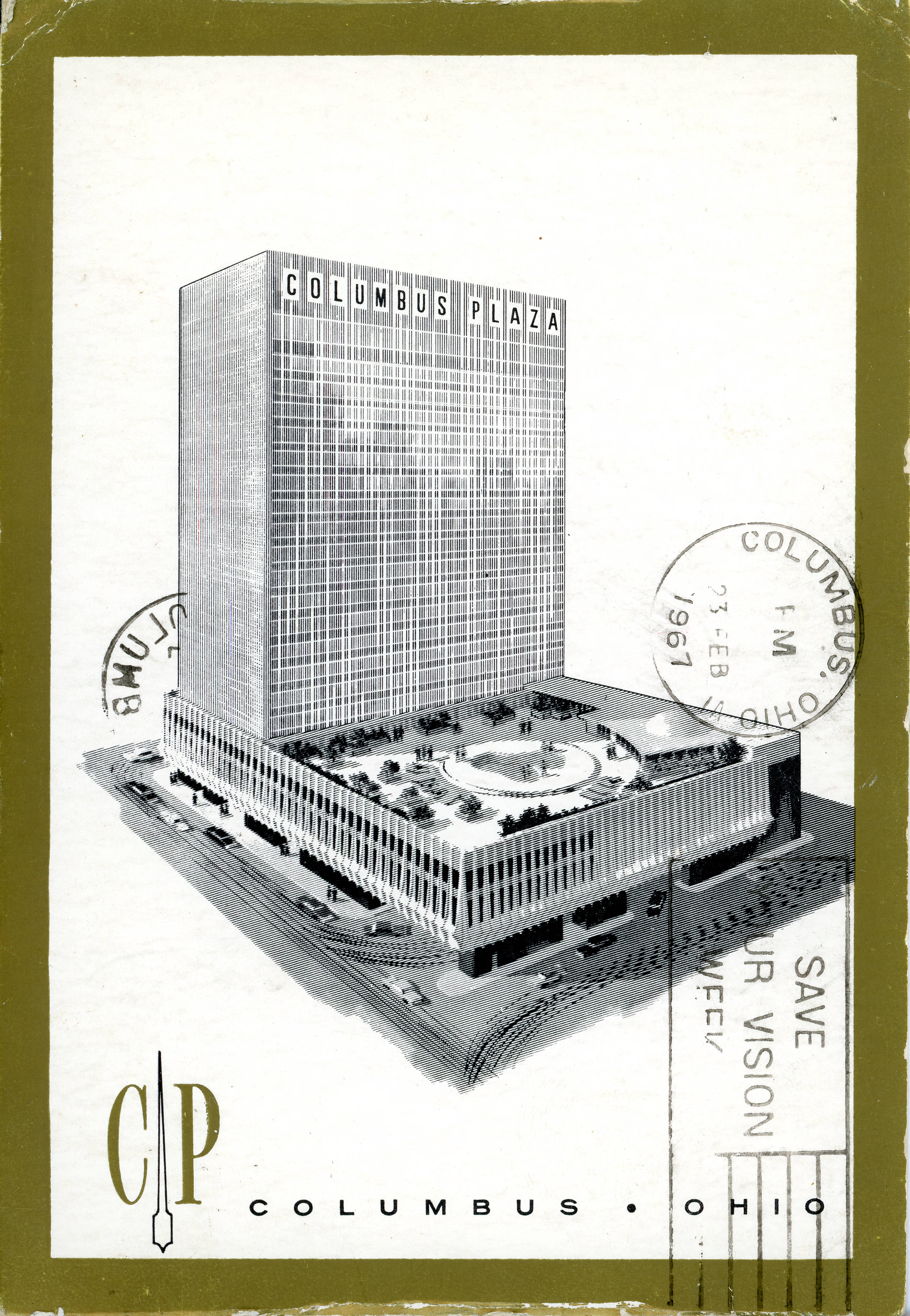
Postcard sketch of the hotel as the Columbus Plaza

During the building's construction in 1963

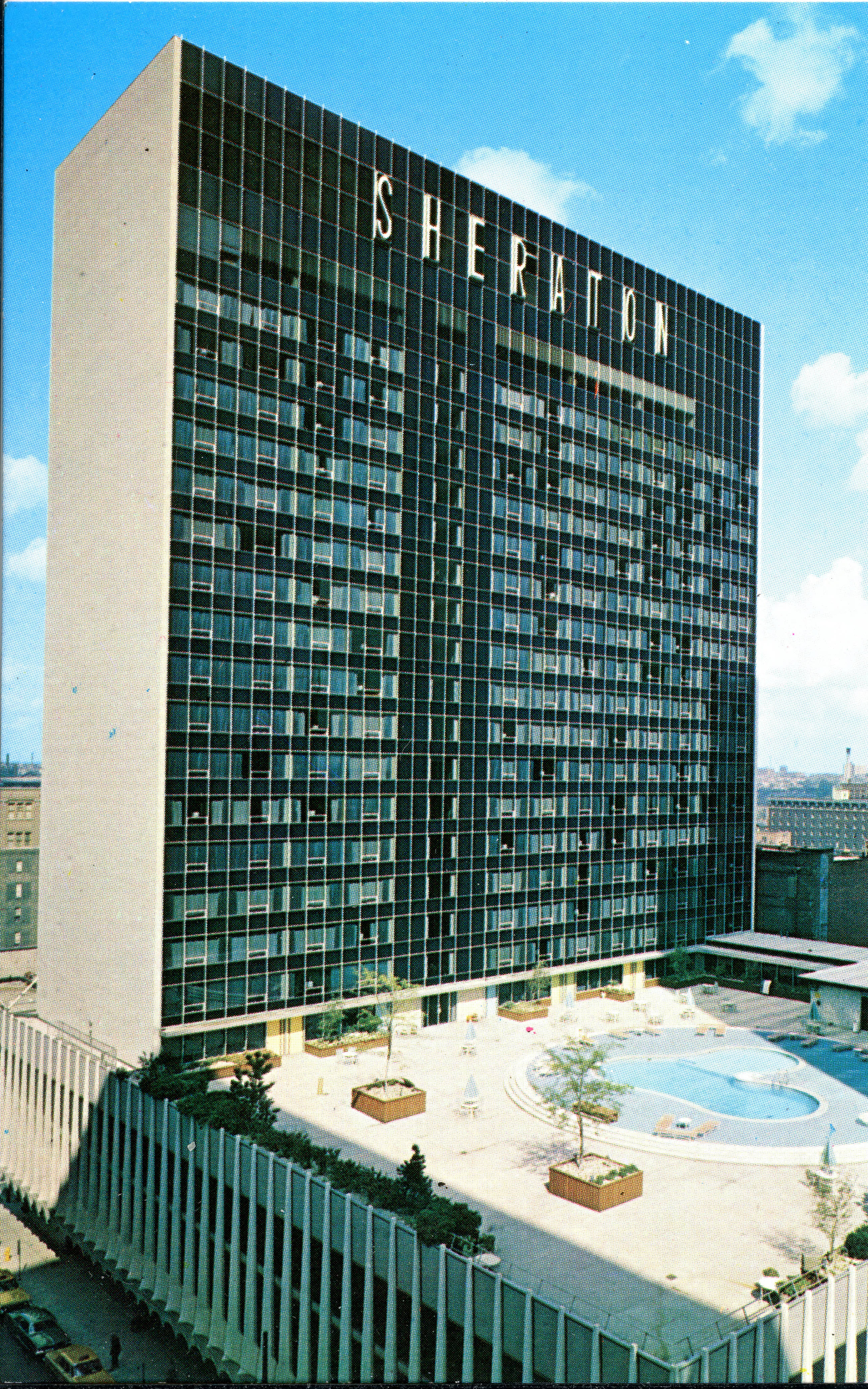
During operation as a Sheraton hotel

On June 14, 1961, the new hotel building was formally proposed at the site, as a "multi-story hotel, with drive-in facilities". The School Employees Retirement Board would have the Virginia Hotel closed, have the Columbus Citizen building's tenants vacated, and the buildings demolished. If investments in a hotel would not materialize, the site would be kept as a parking lot. Later that month, the board aimed to build a $4.7 million hotel with 315 bedrooms and suites, 10 to 12 stories, a 500-person ballroom, six retail stores, and self-service parking for 260 cars. By July, the price changed to $7 million, with 12 stories, to be completed by late 1962. It was to be the first hotel built in Downtown Columbus in over 30 years (after the Fort Hayes Hotel in the mid-1920s). The basement would be used by civic organizations. The building's first story would have retail stores and hotel entrances on Gay and Third Streets, with a drive-in entrance on Third Street. The level would also have kitchens and private dining spaces. The second floor would have a ballroom, restaurant dining room, and bar. The third to fifth floors would have 270 parking spaces, accessed by an automobile elevator. The sixth and seventh would have about 50,000 square feet of office space. The eighth through twelfth floors would hold about 325 guest rooms and suites. A pool and garden on the eighth floor would be exposed to the sky via a four-story central lightwell.

The Columbus Plaza Hotel was approved by the city's planning commission in September 1961. Executives began to inspect hotels in other U.S. cities, anticipating construction to begin once the Virginia Hotel and Citizen Building were razed. The Virginia Hotel closed on August 10, 1961; resident made new arrangements, many to other downtown hotels. S.G. Loewendick & Sons demolished both buildings from late September to December 1961. By April 1962, work on the foundation began, with building construction to take place from May 25, 1962 to September 1963. The hotel was to be the second-tallest building in Columbus, after LeVeque Tower, though Chase Tower held that title soon afterward.

In 1962, Columbus hotels spent about $5 million in upgrades to decor, air conditioning, and other alterations. The hotels were aiming to meet competition from the new Columbus Plaza, as well as from the Christopher Inn, hotels both set to open in 1963.

It opened to the public, along with a ribbon-cutting ceremony, on November 18, 1963. The hotel faced legal battles since its opening, as Ohio's attorney general challenged the right for SERS to invest in and own a hotel. It became a Sheraton hotel in January 1965 under two temporary agreements and later under a long-term lease. The hotel's name was changed to the Sheraton Columbus Motor Hotel in May of that year, and official conversion into a Sheraton began in June, and included numerous branding changes, office expansions, and other improvements. In 1981, further changes took place, giving the hotel "old world charm", taking influences from high-end European hotels. The hotel lost its Sheraton franchise in fall 1986, and the owners hoped to use half of the building for condominiums. That plan was scrapped by January 1987, with new plans to sell half of the building's rooms as private investments, to be rented and maintained by the hotel's management company. The hotel was $14 million in debt at this point, with not enough demand for hotel rooms in Downtown Columbus. The hotel closed on December 1, 1987, gradually beginning in June, including canceling reservations, closing its restaurant, and reducing to a skeleton staff to operate the hotel. Multiple plans to sell the building collapsed, and it was purchased by MetLife around 1989 in a sheriff's sale. A plan in 1990 was to convert the building into apartments; other ideas included a health club, a high-rise parking garage, and a trading company headquarters. In January 1996, it was purchased by HBE Corp., parent company of the Adam's Mark, part of an upscale hotel chain. The hotel reopened as the Adam's Mark on March 21, 1997 after $25 million in renovations. The renovations included extra rooms (415, up from 380), making it the second-largest hotel downtown.

After struggling to make a profit, the hotel owners placed the building for sale in 2003. It was purchased in 2004 to be converted into a Marriott. The hotel remained open during a 2005-2006 renovation, converting it into a Marriott Renaissance Hotel.

== See also ==
- List of tallest buildings in Columbus, Ohio
