= Paul Whitman =

American artist

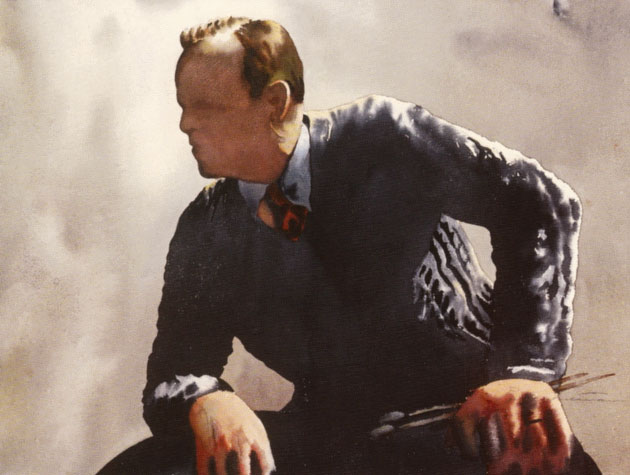
- Paul Whitman Self Portrait.
- Born: April 23, 1897; Denver, Colorado
- Died: December 12, 1950 (aged 53); Carmel-by-the-Sea, California
- Style: landscape and waterfront paintings
- Spouse: Anita Moll
- Website: Paul Whitman website

Paul Lingenbrink Whitman (April 23, 1897–December 12, 1950) was an American artist who lived and worked in the Monterey Peninsula area. He worked in a variety of media that included etching, charcoal drawing, watercolor, oil, lithography, and sculpture.

== Career ==
Whitman was a painter, etcher, illustrator, lithographer, muralist, sculptor and teacher. He was one of the original members of the Carmel Art Association in Carmel and a one time vice-president.

His works are included in the collections of the National Gallery of Art, Mills College Art Museum, the Monterey Museum of Art and the Fine Arts Museums of San Francisco.

== Personal life and death ==
Whitman and his wife Anita had three children. Whitman died on December 12, 1950.
