= Neighborhoods in Columbus, Ohio =

Columbus, the state capital and largest city in Ohio with a population of approximately 933,000 as of 2024, has numerous neighborhoods within its city limits. Neighborhood names and boundaries are not officially defined and may vary or change over time due to demographic and economic variables. Columbus's African American population is largely concentrated in neighborhoods northeast and southeast of Downtown, as well as areas immediately west and east of Downtown such as Franklinton and the Near East Side. The West Side, particularly The Hilltop and Valleyview, is home to a significant and diverse Hispanic population, with people of Mexican descent comprising the largest Hispanic group. Northeast neighborhoods such as Northland and North Linden have notable Puerto Rican and Somali populations — Columbus is home to one of the largest Somali communities in the United States. Areas near Ohio State University have significant populations with origins from India and China.

Neighborhoods in this article are organized by cardinal direction — north, east, south, and west — with intercardinal subsections (northeast, northwest, southeast, southwest) nested within each. Downtown neighborhoods are listed as a distinct section.

== Downtown Columbus ==
Downtown Columbus is the Central Business District of Columbus, centered on the intersection of Broad and High streets. The area encompasses all land inside the inner belt and is home to most of the city's tallest buildings, the Ohio Statehouse, and major institutions including Columbus State Community College, Franklin University, Columbus College of Art and Design, OhioHealth Grant Medical Center, and the main branch of the Columbus Metropolitan Library. Downtown is broadly divided into three areas — the Discovery District, the High Street Corridor, and the Riverfront — and is surrounded by distinct neighborhoods in each direction: The Short North, Italian Village, and Victorian Village to the north; Olde Towne East and King-Lincoln Bronzeville to the east; the Brewery District and German Village to the south; and Franklinton to the west. The northwest quadrant includes the Arena District, anchored by Nationwide Arena, home of the Columbus Blue Jackets. According to the 2024 State of Downtown Columbus report, more than 92,000 people are employed Downtown and approximately 12,500 residents call it home, with nearly 1,500 new housing units under construction as part of ongoing reinvestment.

=== Arena District ===
The Arena District is a mixed-use planned neighborhood in northwest Downtown Columbus, developed through a partnership between Nationwide Realty Investors (a subsidiary of Nationwide), the City of Columbus, and private investors. It is anchored by Nationwide Arena — home of the Columbus Blue Jackets — along with Huntington Park baseball stadium. The district has expanded well beyond its original 75-acre footprint as adjacent blocks have attracted additional commercial and residential development.

=== Discovery District ===
The Discovery District occupies the eastern part of Downtown Columbus, bordered by the I-670 Innerbelt to the north, I-71 to the east, Fulton Street to the south, and Fifth Street to the west. It is home to the Columbus Metropolitan Library, the Columbus Museum of Art, the French Topiary Gardens at Old Deaf School Park, and several institutions of higher education including Columbus College of Art and Design, Franklin University, and Columbus State Community College.

=== Park Street District ===
Park Street District is a subneighborhood of the Arena District, centered on the Park Street thoroughfare and comprising mainly restaurants and bars. It is often considered part of the Short North due to overlapping boundaries and shared attractions such as the North Market.

=== Riverfront ===
The Riverfront District runs along the Scioto River in southwest Downtown Columbus, bounded by Town Street to the north, Wall Street to the east, Mound Street to the south, and the Scioto River to the west.

=== Uptown District ===
The Uptown District is a neighborhood in Downtown Columbus bounded by Nationwide Boulevard to the north, South Fourth Street to the east, East Town Street to the south, and South Front Street to the west.

== North ==
=== Near North ===
==== Short North ====
The Short North is a neighborhood centered on the High Street corridor immediately north of Downtown, extending south of the Ohio State University campus. Known for its art galleries, specialty shops, pubs, nightclubs, and coffee houses, most of its tightly packed brick buildings date from the early 20th century. The city installed 17 lighted metal archways across High Street, reminiscent of arches present in the area in the early 1900s. The Short North hosts a monthly Gallery Hop drawing large crowds to its art galleries and is home to the annual Columbus Pride parade.

==== Italian Village ====
Italian Village is a designated historic district just north of Downtown, containing a mix of residential, commercial, and industrial buildings whose architecture reflects Italian immigrant influence. Part of the broader Short North area, Italian Village has consistently seen some of the highest rates of home value appreciation in Columbus and is known for its historical and cultural preservation.

==== Milo-Grogan ====
Milo-Grogan is a small neighborhood on the near north side of Columbus, bordered by the Norfolk Southern railroad on the north, Cleveland Avenue on the east, I-670 on the south, and the Conrail tracks on the west. One of Columbus's oldest African American communities, Milo-Grogan has been the subject of ongoing revitalization investment tied to the broader redevelopment of the I-670/Cleveland Avenue corridor.

==== Weinland Park ====
Weinland Park is a neighborhood north of Downtown bounded by 12th Avenue on the north, 5th Avenue on the south, the Conrail Railroad tracks on the west, and King Avenue on the east, named for Edgar L. Weinland, a member of Ohio State University's first law class. A streetcar-era development that attracted working- and middle-class families in the 1930s and 1940s, the neighborhood fell into decline with the collapse of local industry and has since undergone significant reinvestment, including new housing, a food district, and commercial development anchored by its proximity to the University District.

==== University District ====
The University District surrounds the main campus of Ohio State University, encompassing the densely populated residential and commercial area between campus and the neighboring communities of Clintonville, Weinland Park, and Fifth by Northwest. The district is home to a large student population and a concentration of restaurants, shops, and entertainment venues along North High Street and campus-adjacent corridors.

==== Glen Echo ====
Glen Echo is a north-central Columbus neighborhood situated along the Glen Echo Ravine, which forms the informal southern boundary of Clintonville. It is characterized by natural ravine landscape and mature residential housing stock.

==== Clintonville ====
Clintonville is a neighborhood in north-central Columbus with approximately 28,600 residents, according to the 2019–2023 American Community Survey, bounded on the south by the Glen Echo Ravine, on the east by the railroad right-of-way east of Indianola Avenue, on the north by the Worthington city limits, and on the west by the Olentangy River. The neighborhood spans ZIP codes 43202 and 43214 and is broadly divided into four sub-areas: South Clintonville, North Clintonville, Beechwold, and North-of-Morse. Clintonville grew as a streetcar suburb along the High Street corridor and retains a strong identity as a walkable, tree-lined urban neighborhood valued for its architectural variety and community character.

South Clintonville is the oldest section of the Clintonville neighborhood, south of North Broadway Street, with housing stock built primarily before 1930 in styles ranging from American Foursquare to various revival forms. North Clintonville is the central section, bounded by Overbrook Ravine to the north and North Broadway Street to the south, with homes built at a higher price point that have driveways rather than alleys and include subdivisions such as Indian Springs, Northridge, Dominion Park, and Northmoor. Beechwold is the northern section, named for the Jeffrey family summer estate on North High Street, roughly bounded by Rathbone Avenue to the north, I-71 to the east, West Weisheimer Road to the south, and the Olentangy River to the west; Old Beechwold was listed on the National Register of Historic Places in 1987. North-of-Morse is the northernmost section, bordered by the Worthington city limits to the north, I-71 to the east, Morse Road to the south, and the Olentangy River to the west, and contains Graceland Shopping Center.

=== Northeast ===
==== Northland ====
Northland is a broad residential and commercial area on the north side of Columbus, east of I-71 along Morse Road within the I-270 outerbelt. Best known as the former site of Northland Mall (1964–2002) and as home to Northland High School, the area encompasses multiple subdivisions and commercial corridors and has developed a distinct identity in recent years driven in part by significant growth in its immigrant and refugee population — Global Mall, a Somali shopping center, anchors a commercial corridor that now serves Columbus's large East African community.

==== Forest Park ====
Forest Park is a neighborhood just north of Linden, bounded by Morse Road to the north, Cooke Road to the south, I-71 to the west, and Maize Road to the east. It is considered part of the larger Northland area.

==== Northwood Park ====
Northwood Park is a north Columbus neighborhood near Ohio State University, known for its early 20th-century architecture, proximity to Tuttle Park, and dining along North High Street.

==== Linden ====
Linden is a neighborhood in the northeastern part of Columbus extending from 8th Avenue to Ward Road (south to north) and from the Conrail tracks to Joyce Avenue/Westerville Road (west to east), divided by Hudson Street into North Linden and South Linden. North Linden is bounded by Cooke and Ferris roads to the north and is home to Linden Park and the Linden Community Center. South Linden, south of Hudson Street, includes some of Columbus's oldest African American residential communities. Linden-McKinley STEM Academy serves the area.

==== Argyle Park ====
Argyle Park is a residential neighborhood on the northeast side of Columbus, east of Linden, bounded by East Hudson Street on the north, Woodland Avenue on the east, East 17th and 26th avenues on the south, and Billiter Boulevard on the west.

=== Northwest ===
==== Victorian Village ====
Victorian Village is a residential neighborhood north and near west of Downtown, characterized by an older housing stock, established trees, and a quieter urban character than the adjacent Short North. Its main thoroughfare is Neil Avenue, which runs north–south and eventually crosses through the Ohio State University campus.

==== Harrison West ====
Harrison West is a historic urban neighborhood north and near west of Downtown, bounded by Harrison Avenue on the east, Goodale Street on the south, Fifth Avenue on the north, and Olentangy River Road to the west. Established in the late 19th and early 20th centuries on farmland along the Olentangy River, it is characterized by Victorian and Edwardian-style homes more modest than those in Victorian Village, with brick streets and fine examples of turn-of-the-century American town planning and architecture. In 2008 the neighborhood expanded to include Thurber Village to the southeast. Just south of Harrison West, the former neighborhood of Flytown was demolished in the 1960s during urban renewal and replaced by I-670 and commercial development.

==== Flytown ====
Flytown was a historic working-class neighborhood south of Harrison West, populated primarily by Irish and German immigrants in the 19th and early 20th centuries. It was demolished in the 1960s as part of urban renewal and no longer exists as a residential community; the area is now occupied by I-670 and the James Thurber Village apartment and business complex.

==== Fifth by Northwest ====
Fifth by Northwest — also known as 5xNW or the Tri-Village area — covers approximately 700 acres roughly bounded by Glenn Avenue and Kinnear to the north, Third Avenue to the south, Kenny Road and Olentangy River Road to the east, and Northstar Road to the west. Just north of Grandview Heights and northwest of Harrison West, the neighborhood features walkable commercial development along Grandview Avenue and is adjacent to Upper Arlington and Marble Cliff.

==== West Olentangy ====
West Olentangy is a northwest Columbus neighborhood along the Olentangy River corridor between the University District and the I-270 outerbelt.

== East ==
=== Near East ===
==== Near East Side ====
The Near East Side is a historic community immediately east of Downtown Columbus, bounded by I-670 to the north, I-70 to the south, Alum Creek to the east, and I-71 to the west. It encompasses several distinct neighborhoods — including Mount Vernon, King-Lincoln Bronzeville, Eastgate, Franklin Park, Olde Towne East, and Woodland Park — and has been the focus of sustained city revitalization investment, including the renovation of the Lincoln Theatre and the expansion of Nationwide Children's Hospital.

==== King-Lincoln Bronzeville ====
King-Lincoln Bronzeville is a neighborhood on the Near East Side named for the King Arts Complex and the historic Lincoln Theatre, which anchor its arts and music identity. Revitalization efforts have included restoration of the Lincoln Theatre, new residential construction, and retail expansion along Mount Vernon Avenue and East Long Street.

==== Mount Vernon ====
Mount Vernon is a Near East Side neighborhood whose limits are defined by its main thoroughfares: Mount Vernon Avenue, East Long Street, Atcheson Street, and Champion Avenue. It borders Interstates 71 and 670 and is part of the broader King-Lincoln Bronzeville community.

==== Olde Towne East ====
Olde Towne East is one of Columbus's oldest and largest historic neighborhoods, located on the Near East Side with over 1,000 homes dating as far back as the 1830s. The area features more than 50 architectural styles including Italianate, Queen Anne, and Victorian, and is situated among Downtown, Franklin Park, King-Lincoln Bronzeville, and Livingston Park North.

==== East Broad Street Historic District ====
The East Broad Street Historic District was listed on the National Register of Historic Places in 1987 and encompasses the section of East Broad Street from Ohio Avenue on the west to Monypenny Street on the east.

==== Eastgate / Nelson Park ====
Developed in 1916, the Eastgate neighborhood includes Nelson Park, Eastgate Elementary School, and the East Broad Street and Nelson Road intersection. The neighborhood is commonly referred to by both names interchangeably.

==== Franklin Park ====
The Franklin Park neighborhood is bounded by East Broad Street to the north, Alum Creek to the east, East Main Street to the south, and Wilson Avenue to the west, and is named for the 88-acre park at its heart, which contains the Franklin Park Conservatory and Botanical Gardens.

==== South of Main ====
South of Main is a Near East Side neighborhood bounded by Main Street to the north, Alum Creek to the east, I-70 to the south, and Wilson Avenue to the west.

==== Woodland Park ====
Woodland Park was established at the turn of the twentieth century as one of Columbus's first planned upscale suburban neighborhoods, bounded by Maryland Avenue to the north, Nelson Road to the east, East Broad Street to the south, and Taylor Avenue to the west. The neighborhood attracted founding families, industrialists, and artists, and retains an eclectic architectural mix including Colonial, Federal, Arts and Crafts, Victorian, Tudor, Mission, Foursquare, and Cape Cod styles.

==== Wolfe Park ====
Wolfe Park is a neighborhood on the east side of Columbus, surrounded on three sides by the city of Bexley and bounded on the west by Alum Creek and Franklin Park. Formerly known as the Marion Heights Addition, it was platted in 1909.

==== Old Oaks ====
Old Oaks is a historic district east of Downtown Columbus, bounded by Mooberry Street to the north, Kimball Place to the east, East Livingston Avenue to the south, and South Ohio Avenue to the west. The neighborhood is characterized by American Foursquare, Neoclassical Revival, and Modified Queen Anne architecture and is part of the historic Livingston Avenue streetcar corridor.

==== Livingston Park ====
Livingston Park is a neighborhood bounded by South 3rd Street to the west, Livingston Avenue to the south, Mooberry Street to the north, and Ohio Avenue to the east, sharing its name with the oldest publicly owned parkland in Columbus. Its western commercial areas include the site of Nationwide Children's Hospital.

==== Driving Park ====
Driving Park is an urban residential neighborhood on the Near East Side, just south of Interstate 70, bounded by I-70 on the north, the N&W Railway on the east, East Whittier Street on the south, and Lockbourne Avenue on the west. Situated between Bexley and German Village, it was part of one of Columbus's earliest streetcar suburb corridors along Livingston Avenue.

==== Berwick ====
Berwick is a middle-class east-side neighborhood bordered by Livingston Avenue to the north, Alum Creek to the west, I-70 to the south, and S. James Road to the east, situated just south of the suburb of Bexley and known for its diverse racial and religious population.

=== Far East ===
==== Far East Side ====
East Columbus — commonly called the Far East Side — encompasses the broad residential and commercial areas east of Alum Creek and beyond the I-270 outerbelt, including Eastland, Walnut Ridge, and the Brice-Tussing area. The area has expanded substantially through annexation and is home to major commercial corridors and a mix of postwar and newer residential subdivisions. The former Eastland Mall site is the subject of a large-scale city redevelopment initiative.

== South ==
=== Near South ===
==== Brewery District ====
The Brewery District is located just south of Downtown, bounded by I-70 on the north, South Pearl Street on the east, Greenlawn Avenue on the south, and the Scioto River on the west. German immigrant Louis Hoster opened the area's first brewery in 1836, and at its peak the district housed five major breweries before Prohibition ended the industry in 1920. After decades as an industrial and warehouse area, the district was redeveloped beginning in the 1990s and is now home to restaurants, bars, residential lofts, and cultural venues, including Shadowbox Live.

==== German Village ====
German Village is a historic neighborhood just south of Downtown, settled by German immigrants in the mid-19th century who once constituted as much as a third of Columbus's total population. The neighborhood is characterized by sturdy red-brick homes with wrought iron fences along tree-lined, brick-paved streets, with a commercial strip centered on South Third Street. Schiller Park at the southern end — named after Friedrich von Schiller — hosts recreational facilities, gardens, and an amphitheater with free summer Shakespearean performances. German Village was listed on the National Register of Historic Places on December 30, 1974 and is the largest privately funded historic district on the National Register in the United States.

==== Merion Village ====
Merion Village is a neighborhood just south of German Village, with homes built primarily around the turn of the 20th century. The neighborhood has seen ongoing residential renovation and increased public safety investment in recent years.

==== Hungarian Village ====
Hungarian Village is a south Columbus neighborhood between Merion Village and Reeb-Hosack/Steelton Village, encompassing the area between Woodrow and Hinman avenues, between South High Street and Parsons Avenue. At the turn of the 20th century, it became home to Hungarian, Croatian, and Italian immigrants, and later sheltered refugees from the failed Hungarian Revolution of 1956.

==== Schumacher Place ====
Schumacher Place is a small neighborhood east of German Village, bordered by East Livingston Avenue to the north, Parsons Avenue to the east, East Whittier Street to the south, and South Grant Avenue to the west. It is architecturally similar to German Village and is sometimes mistaken for part of it.

==== Southern Orchards ====
Southern Orchards is a near south-side neighborhood anchored by Nationwide Children's Hospital, one of the nation's leading pediatric medical centers, whose ongoing expansion has driven significant reinvestment in the surrounding community. The hospital's Healthy Homes program has improved more than 70 properties in the area since 2008.

==== Reeb-Hosack / Steelton Village ====
Reeb-Hosack/Steelton Village is a south-side neighborhood between Reeb Avenue and Hosack Street, bordered by South High Street to the west and Parsons Avenue to the east.

==== Near South Side ====
The Near South Side is a south Columbus neighborhood bordered by Whittier Street to the north, Lockbourne to the east, Frebis Avenue to the south, and Parsons Avenue to the west, encompassing civic organizations including Thurman Square, Ganthers Place, South Central Commons, and Edgewood.

=== Southeast ===
==== Innis Gardens ====
Innis Gardens is a south Columbus neighborhood bordered by Moler Road to the north, Fairwood Avenue to the east, Innis Avenue to the south, and Lockbourne Road to the west.

==== Edgewood Acres ====
Edgewood Acres is a south Columbus neighborhood bordered by Thurman Avenue to the north, Lockbourne Road to the east, Frebis Avenue to the south, and South Champion Avenue to the west.

==== Lincoln Park / Vassor Village ====
Lincoln Park/Vassor Village is a south Columbus neighborhood bordered by East Whittier Street to the north, Fairwood Avenue or Alum Creek Drive to the east, Moler Road or Frebis Avenue to the south, and Lockbourne Road to the west.

== West ==
The West Side encompasses the southwestern quadrant of the city and is among Columbus's largest geographic regions. Unlike most Columbus neighborhood designations, "the West Side" is a collective identity used by residents, media, and civic institutions rather than a formally defined boundary. The area is bounded on the north by Interstates 70 and 670, on the east by Interstate 71, and on the south and west by the city limits extending beyond the I-270 outerbelt, encompassing ZIP codes 43204, 43222, 43223, and 43228.

=== Near West ===
==== Franklinton ====
Franklinton is one of the oldest communities in central Ohio, founded in 1797 by Lucas Sullivant on the west bank of the Scioto River — predating Columbus itself by 15 years. The neighborhood is bounded by the Scioto River on the north and east, Greenlawn Avenue on the south, and I-70 on the west, with West Broad Street (U.S. Route 40) as its main thoroughfare. Long nicknamed "The Bottoms" for its low-lying position below the flood level of the Scioto and Olentangy rivers, Franklinton was barred from new development by the federal government in the 1980s until the completion of a 7.2-mile floodwall in 2004. Since then, the neighborhood has experienced arts-led revitalization centered on the Franklinton Arts District and the Columbus Idea Foundry, one of the largest makerspaces in the world, with major mixed-use developments including WestRich and The Peninsula underway along the Scioto riverfront.

==== The Hilltop ====
The Hilltop is the largest neighborhood area on the West Side, sitting atop a rise above the Scioto River valley. The Greater Hilltop Area is bounded by I-70 on the north, the B&O Railroad to the east and south, and the I-270 outerbelt on the south and west, with West Broad Street (U.S. Route 40), Mound Street, and Hague Avenue as its main thoroughfares. Predominantly single-family residential, the area encompasses approximately 9,917 acres and functions as a collection of smaller sub-neighborhoods — reflected in its motto, "A Neighborhood of Neighborhoods." The Hilltop includes the following sub-neighborhoods:

- Highland West — The original historic settlement of the Hilltop, begun in the early to mid-1800s, bordered by West Broad Street to the north, I-70 and Franklinton to the east, Sullivant Avenue to the south, and Hague Avenue to the west. Named for the end-of-the-line streetcar that served the area in the late 1800s, its earliest settlers were of English, Welsh, and African American descent.
- North Hilltop — A sub-neighborhood in the greater Hilltop area, bordered on the north by Valleyview Drive.
- Westgate — Developed in the early 1920s on the former site of Camp Chase, the Civil War prison and training camp, and bounded by West Broad Street to the north, Sullivant Avenue to the south, Hague Avenue to the west, and Demorest Road to the east. The neighborhood's street names reflect the Quaker settlers who occupied the land between the Civil War era and residential development; its housing stock includes Cape Cods, bungalows, Tudor cottages, and Colonial Revival homes.
- Georgian Heights — Bordered by Sullivant Avenue to the north, Demorest Road to the east, Clime Road to the south, and Georgesville Road to the west.
- Holly Hill — A 1960s suburban neighborhood of brick ranch and bi-level houses adjacent to Georgian Heights.
- Brookshire — A community along Briggs Road between Binns Boulevard and Eakin Road.
- Briggsdale — A neighborhood along Briggs Road, bounded by Eakin Road, Harrisburg Pike, and Demorest Road, on the south Hilltop and northern southwest side.

==== Cherry Creek ====
Cherry Creek is a West Side neighborhood along the Scioto River corridor between Franklinton and the core Hilltop neighborhoods.

==== Murray Hill ====
Murray Hill is a residential neighborhood on the West Side.

==== Riverbend ====
Riverbend is a residential neighborhood on the West Side, near the Scioto River.

==== Hardesty Heights ====
Hardesty Heights is a residential community on the West Side.

==== Wiltshire Heights ====
Wiltshire Heights is a residential community on the West Side.

=== Far West ===
==== Lincoln Village ====
Lincoln Village is a planned community in the far western portion of the West Side, founded in 1955 by the Peoples Development Company — a real estate subsidiary of Nationwide Insurance — on 1,270 acres of farmland. Named for Nationwide president Murray D. Lincoln, the $30 million development was designed as a self-contained community with its own school, library, churches, civic center, and shopping center, built to house 10,000 residents. Featured in Life magazine at its opening, Lincoln Village was deliberately sited near the General Motors and Westinghouse plants to serve West Side industrial workers.

== See also ==
- Columbus, Ohio
- West Side, Columbus, Ohio
- Franklinton, Columbus, Ohio
- German Village
- The Hilltop, Columbus, Ohio
- Short North
- Clintonville (Columbus, Ohio)
