= Gilbert Hamilton (disambiguation) =

Gilbert Hamilton (1869–1947) was a Swedish nobleman and soldier.

Gilbert Hamilton may also refer to:

== People ==
- Gilbert Hamilton (minister) (1715–1772), Scottish minister
- Gilbert P. Hamilton (1890–1962), American film director
- Gilbert Van Tassel Hamilton (1877–1943), American physician and writer
- Gilbert Hamilton of Glenarbuck (1744–1808), Scottish merchant

== Other uses ==
- Gilbert H. Hamilton House, a historic building in Columbus, Ohio
