= Briggsdale =

Briggsdale may refer to one of the following places in the United States:

- Briggsdale, Columbus, Ohio, a neighborhood of Columbus
- Briggsdale, Colorado, an unincorporated community
