= Argyle Park (Columbus, Ohio) =

Neighborhood in Columbus, Ohio, United States

Coordinates: 40°00′23″N 82°57′29″W

Interactive map of the neighborhood

Argyle Park is a residential neighborhood in the Northeast side of Columbus, Ohio, east of Linden. It is bounded by East Hudson Street on the north, Woodland Avenue on the east, East 17th and East 26th avenues on the south, and Billiter Boulevard on the west.

== Schools ==
- Hamilton Elementary School
- Linden-McKinley High School
- Welcome Center High School
