= University District (Columbus, Ohio) =

Neighborhood of Columbus, Ohio

- Neighborhood of Columbus
- Interactive map of University District
- Coordinates: 40°00′41″N 83°00′34″W
- Country: United States
- State: Ohio
- County: Franklin
- City: Columbus

The University District (or University Area), is a 2.8-square-mile (7.3 km^{2}) area located 2 miles (3.2 km) north of Downtown Columbus, Ohio that is home to the main campus of Ohio State University, the Battelle Institute, and Wexner Medical Center. It is generally accepted as the area bounded to the north by Clintonville at Glen Echo Ravine; to the south by the Short North at 5th Avenue; to the west by the Olentangy River and to east by the Conrail railroad tracks. Points of interest include, but are not limited to, the Ohio Stadium and Old North Columbus. The district is Columbus' most densely populated area and contains more than 650 businesses, human service agencies, churches, and schools. University District businesses include boutiques, mixed retail, several tattoo studios, the Gateway Film Center, and a diverse range of restaurants and bars.

== Neighborhoods ==
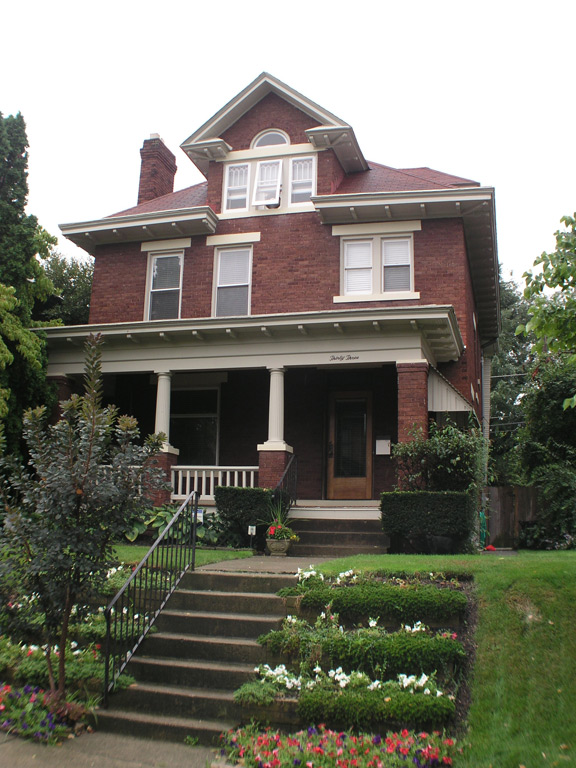
Northwood Park has many homes with rich histories

The University District comprises many diverse neighborhoods, each with its own unique housing stock and cultural identity. There are a variety of residential neighborhoods, several historic districts as well as the off-campus core student neighborhood.

The residential neighborhood with higher concentrated rental property and student housing is located east of High Street south of 17th Avenue and north of 11th Avenue. This is often referred to as the off-campus neighborhood, and, in the past ten years, it has gone through considerable redevelopment and revitalization as a result of the work of Campus Partners. The center of it is the University District Central, which ranges from 13th to 18th Avenues, west of N. Fourth Street.

Old North Columbus, commonly referenced as the general area north of Woodruff, east to Silver Drive, west to the Olentangy River Road, and north to Slate Run, was once the village of North Columbus that was platted in 1842. Old North Columbus includes several smaller neighborhoods within these general boundaries, including the Iuka Ravine and Indianola Forest (Lane Avenue to Woodruff Avenue, between High Street and N. Fourth Street), Oakland & Northwood Avenue Area (Patterson Avenue to Northwood Avenue, between Pearl Alley and Indianola Avenue), Tuttle Park, and Glen Echo (north of Hudson Street and east of Indianola). Old North Columbus was home several historic Columbus Public Schools, such as Northwood Elementary (closed in 1980s?), Medary Elementary (closed in 2006), North High (closed 1970s), and the Special Education Center. Old North has several parks, such as Tuttle, Glen Echo, Maynard & Summit, Iuka Ravine, and Indianola Middle School, as well as multiple churches, restaurants, and other small businesses.

The southern area of the University District also has a higher density of homeownership and includes land west of High Street, ranging from Fifth Avenue to 11th Avenue (The Circles, Dennison Place, and NECKO),* as well as land on the east side of High Street, ranging from Fifth Avenue to 12th Avenue (Weinland Park).

== History ==
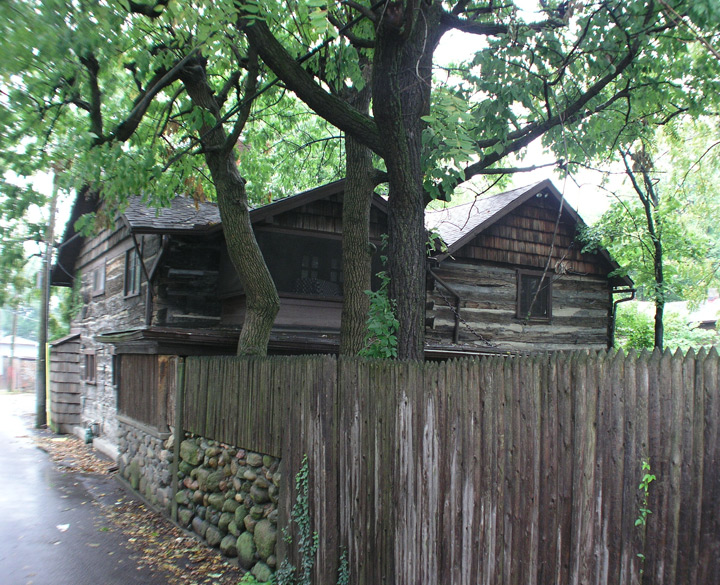
Conn Baker relocated portions of an 1806 log cabin to the University District in 1904

=== Inception ===
The University District (or University Area) was not originally part of the city of Columbus. Platted in 1812 as a new city to be the State capital, Columbus was a small town until late in the nineteenth century. One of the major events in the evolution of the area was the decision to locate the State Agricultural College Grounds (Ohio State University) on the site of the Neil farm in 1870, south of the community of North Columbus. The university grew slowly at first, but began to expand significantly under the presidency of William Oxley Thompson from 1900 to 1925.

As the area grew, fashionable residential suburbs grew up around the campus in places like the Dennison Addition and the Indianola subdivision with its curved roads and ravine. In the 1890s the streetcar transformed the area allowing middle-class people to more easily live in the University Area and make the thirty-minute journey to work in downtown Columbus.

=== Indianola Park ===
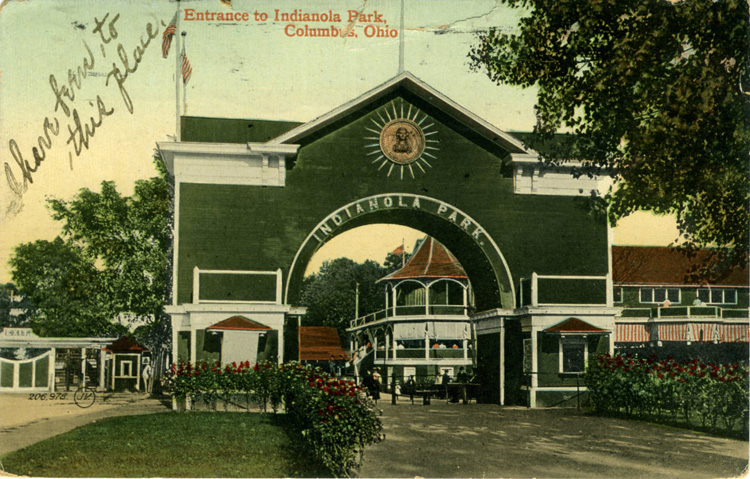
Indianola Park's entrance was on the corner of 19th Avenue and 4th Street.

Indianola Park was an amusement park that operated in the University District from 1905 to 1937. It was the biggest draw of the region, and streets carts took people to and from the location. The park peaked in popularity in the 1910s, entertaining crowds of up to 10 thousand with the numerous roller coasters and rides, with up to 5 thousand in the massive pool alone. The park was also the home field for the Columbus Panhandles for half of a decade. In the 1920s, new owners bought and remodeled the park, and it did well until it closed its doors at the end of the Great Depression.

=== Population explosion ===
Up until the end of World War II, the University Area was occupied by more homeowners than renters. That fact changed with the return of thousands of veterans from the war. The population in the University Area quadrupled.

To house the growing population, high rise dormitories were built at both ends of the main campus and hundreds of owner occupied houses were either converted to rooming houses, rental units, or were torn down to make way for apartment buildings. The increased density gave rise to problems around vehicular congestion, crime, and litter.

To cope with these problems, a number of organizations came into being: the University Community Association, an umbrella for the neighborhood organizations in the area; the University District Organization, a neighborhood planning and development organization; the University Community Business Association, the voice of economic enterprise in the area; and the University Area Commission, an advisory commission to Columbus City Council.

== University Area Commission ==
The University Area Commission (UAC) as an administrative unit was created in 1972 by an act of the Columbus City Council. The University Area Commission is a voluntary, elected, citizens advisory board. In creating the city's first area commission, Columbus City Council delegated certain development oversight and planning responsibilities to stakeholders living in the communities affected by council decisions. Accordingly, new development plans are generally submitted first to an area commission and then to the city council for approval.

The UAC oversees development in what the city refers to as "the university area", bounded in the west by the Olentangy River, in the north by Glen Echo Ravine, in the east by the Conrail line, and in the south by 5th avenue. The Ohio State University itself expands north and west over the Olentangy River for several miles and into Upper Arlington.

== Development ==
The City of Columbus has designated portions of the University District as a Community Reinvestment Area that is "ready for revitalization", with available 15-year, 100 percent tax abatements for all projects that include 10 percent affordable housing, with options to buy out of the requirement.

== Gallery ==
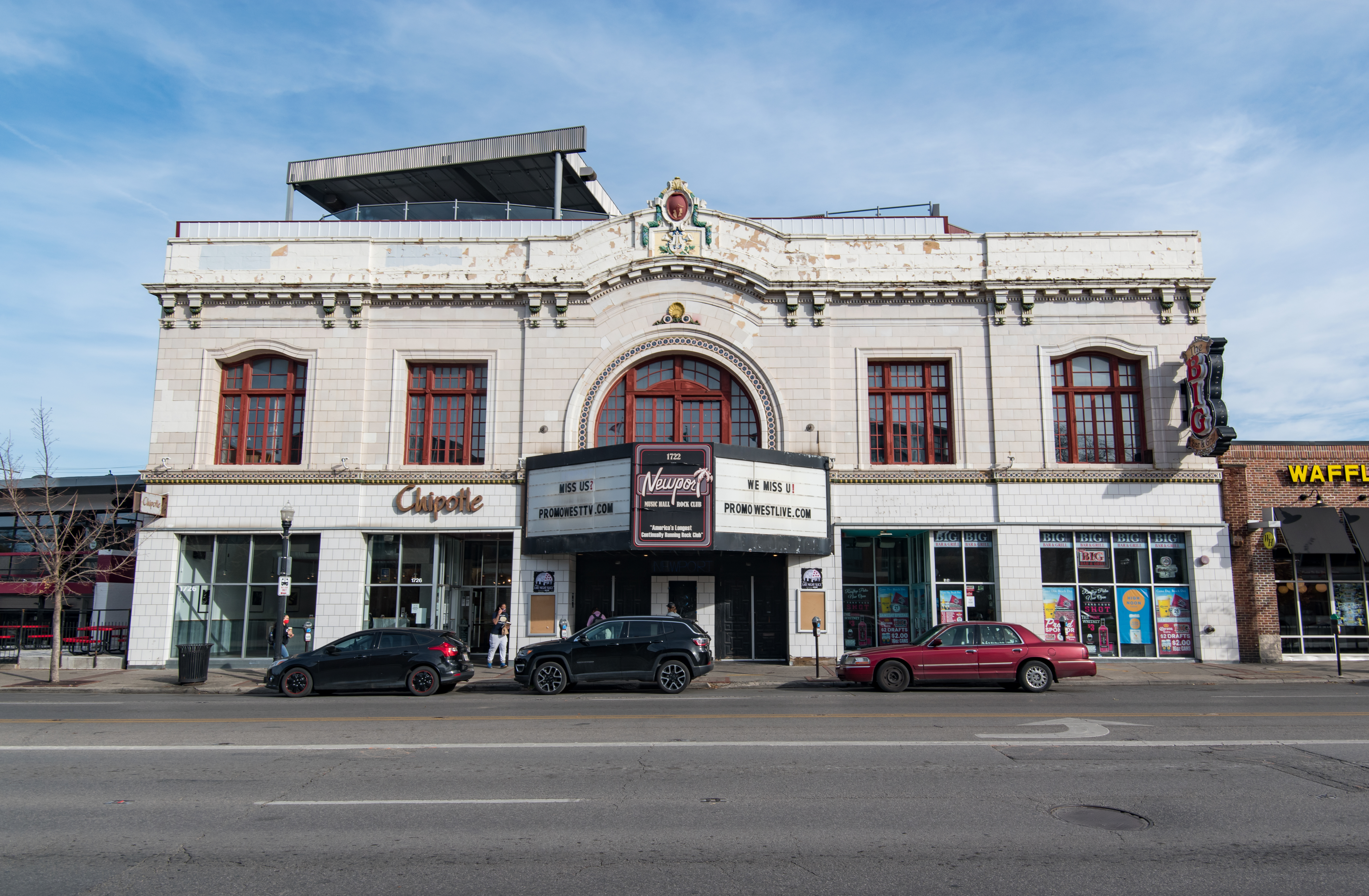
The Newport Music Hall

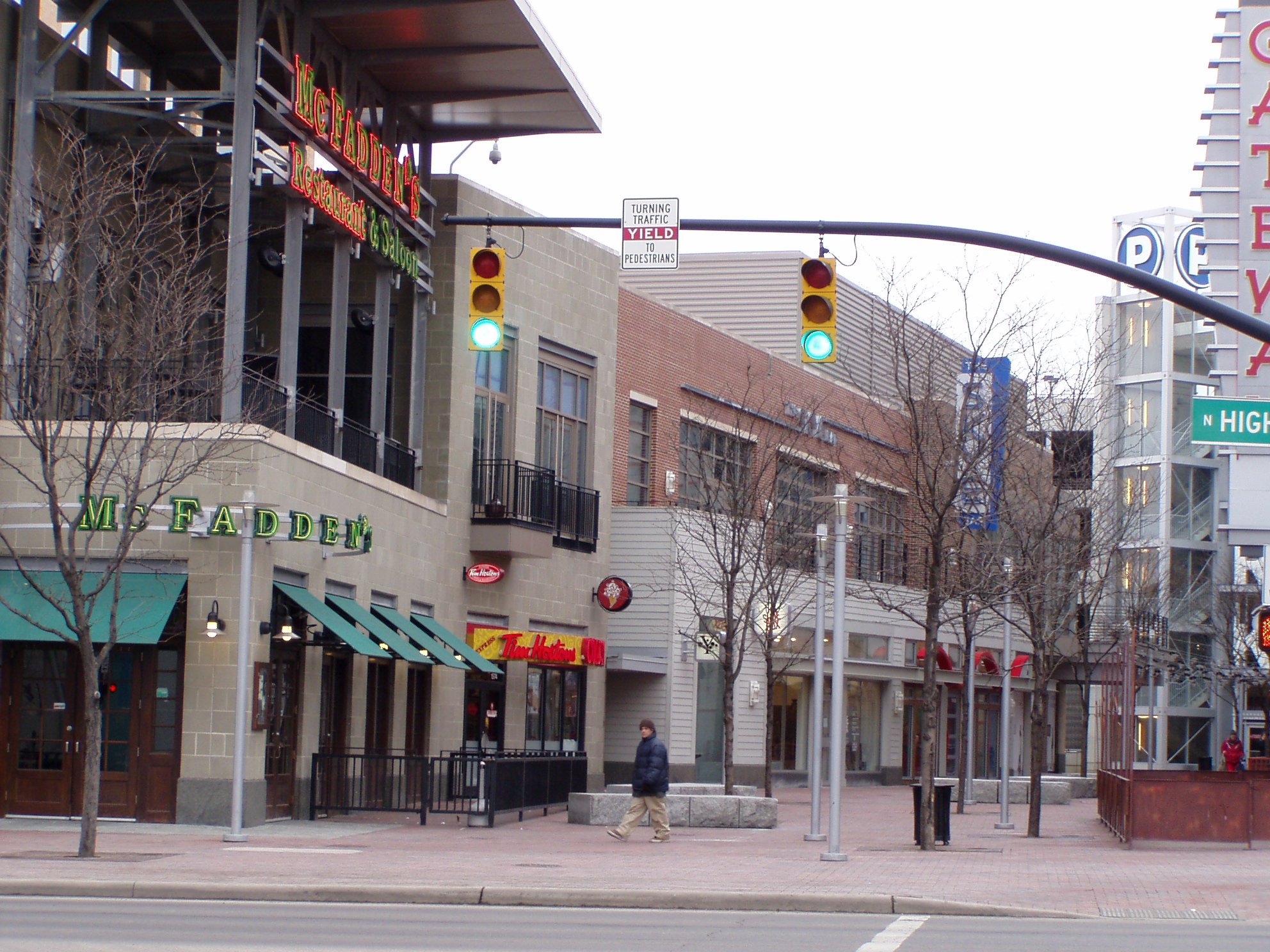
South Campus Gateway

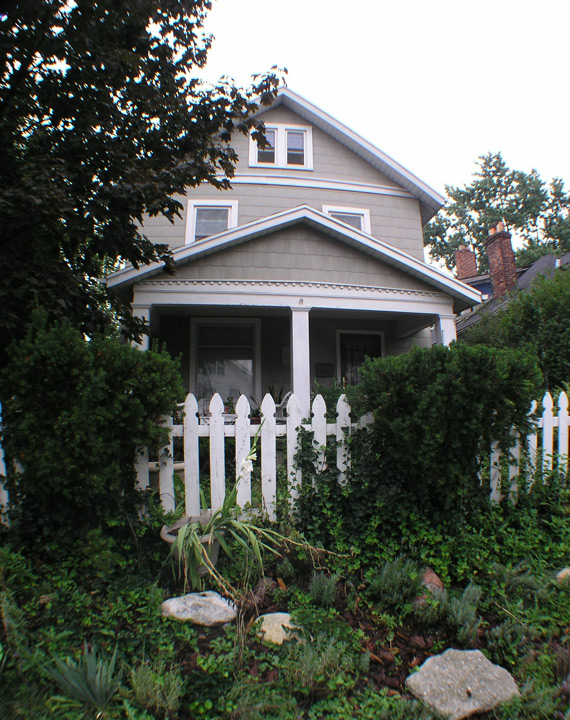
Glen Echo Neighborhood home

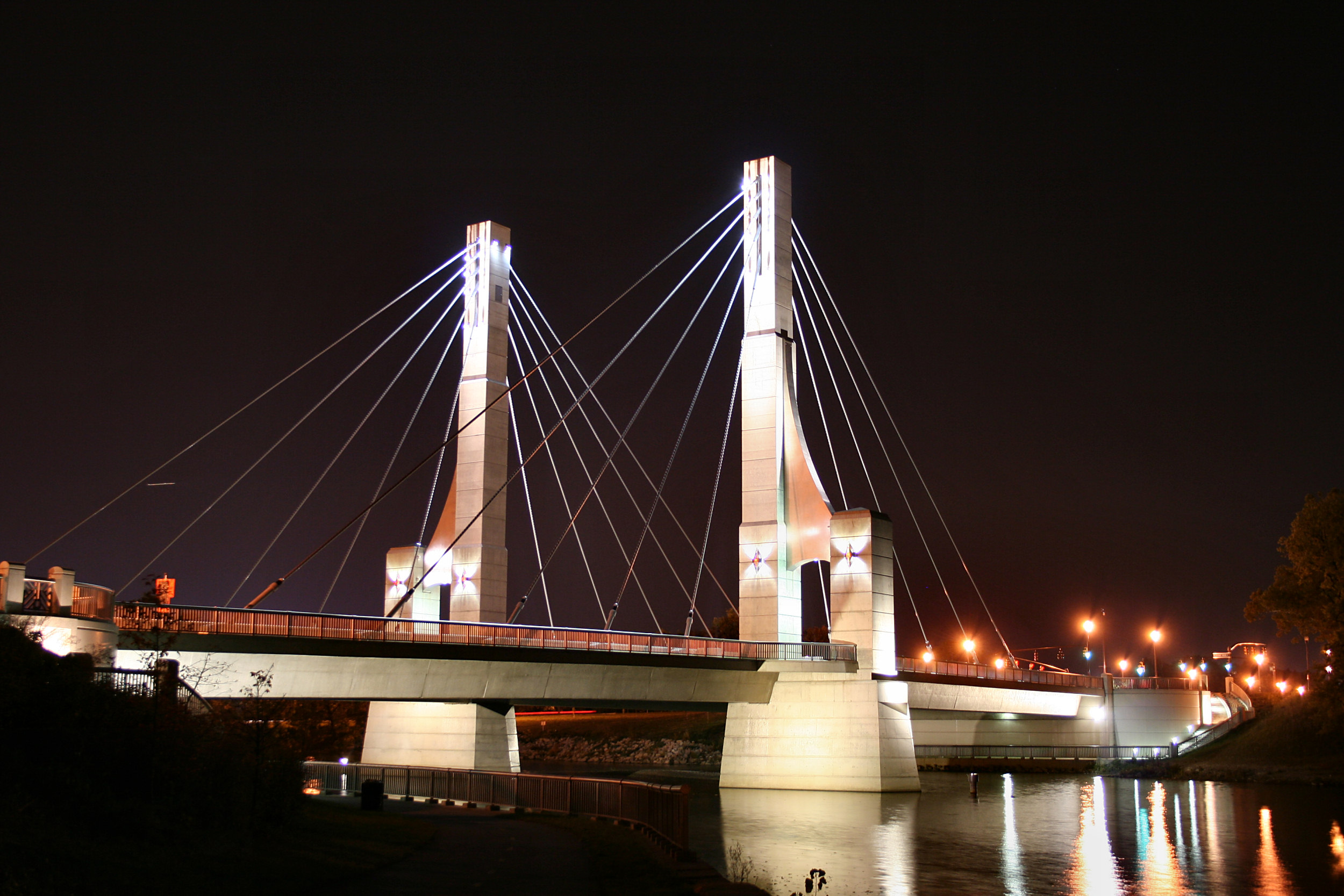
Cable-stayed bridge over the Olentangy River at Lane Avenue

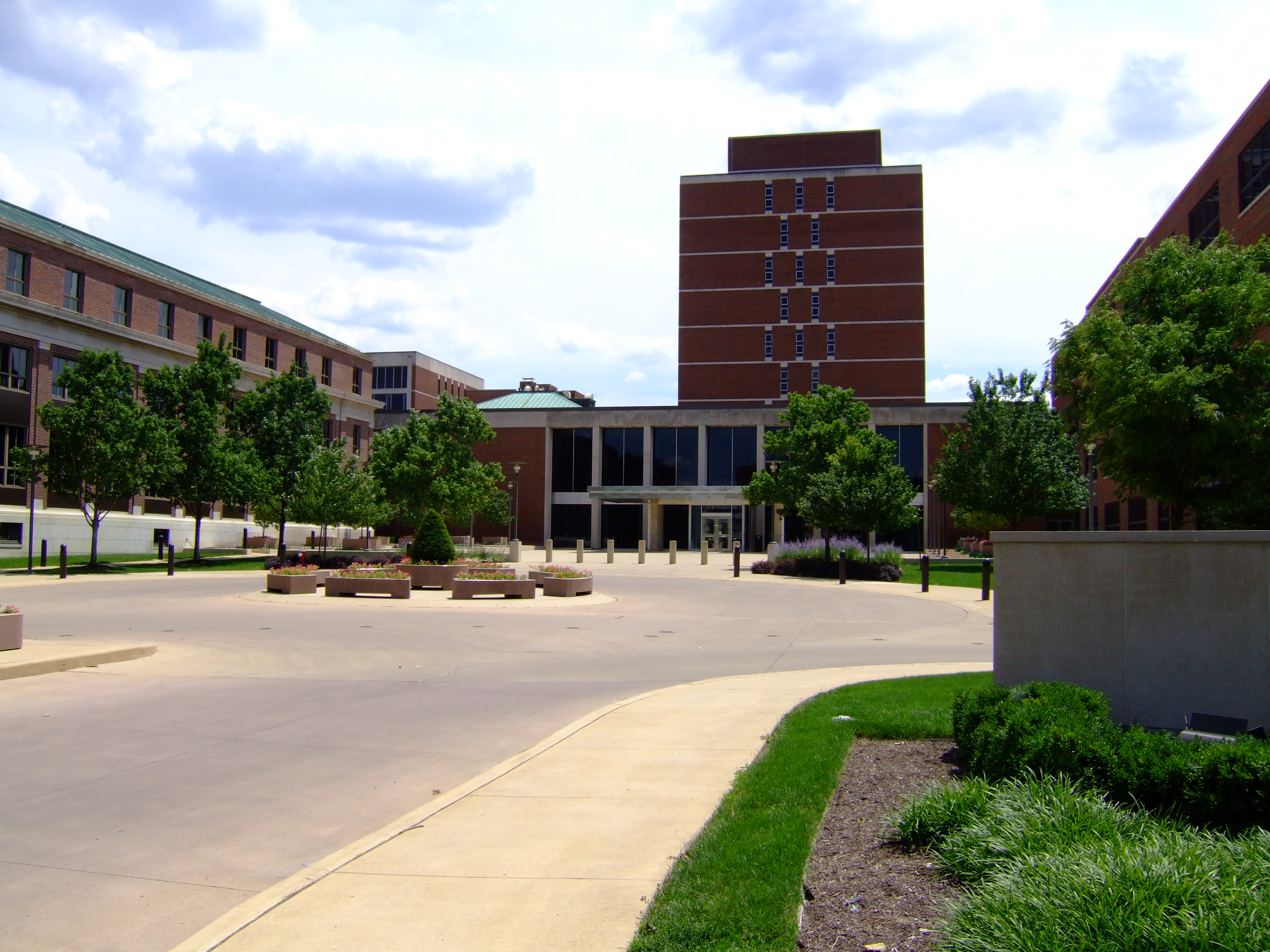
The main entrance to Battelle Memorial Institute in Columbus

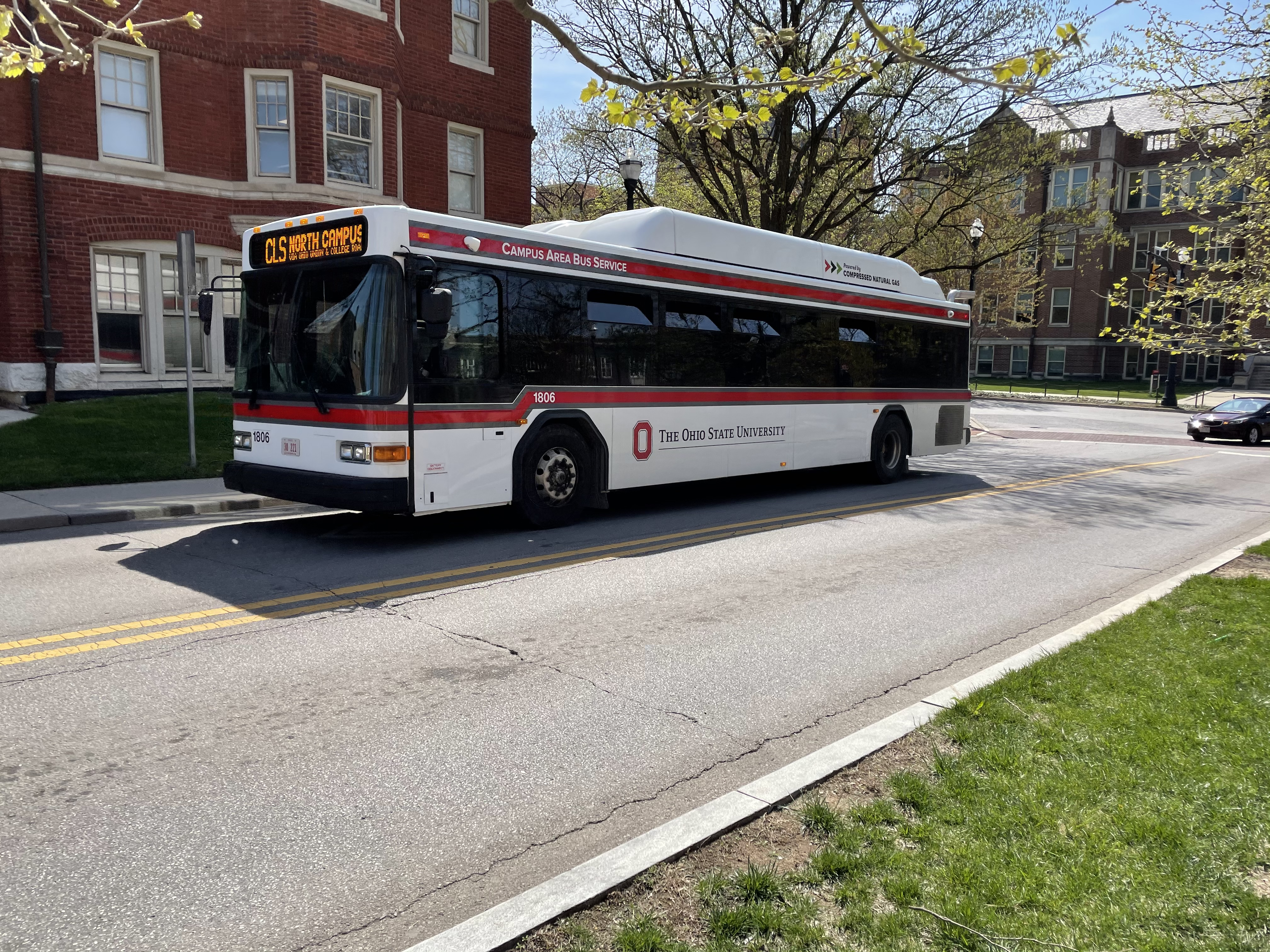
An Ohio State CABS Bus

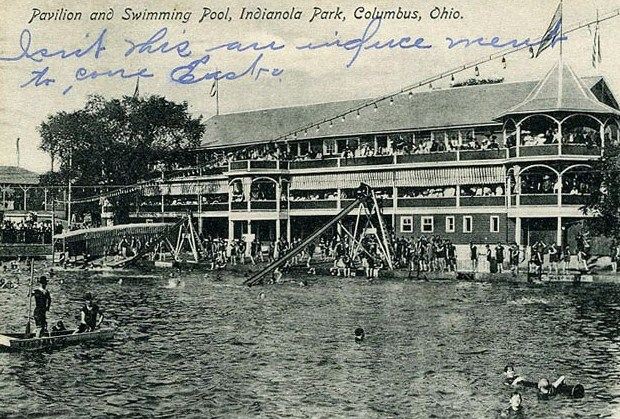
Defunct Indianola Park pavilion and pool

== Notable residents ==
=== Writers and artists ===
- George Bellows, artist
- Milton Caniff, cartoonist
- Harlan Ellison, writer
- Roy Lichtenstein, artist
- R.L. Stine, writer
- James Thurber, humorist/cartoonist
- Jay DeMarcus, musician

=== Astronauts ===
- Charles Bassett, astronaut
- Nancy Currie, astronaut
- Richard Linnehan, astronaut
- Ronald Sega, astronaut

=== Inventors ===
- Cromwell Dixon, inventor and aviator
- Charles Kettering, inventor
- Roy Plunkett, inventor

=== Viral Celebrities ===
- Ted Williams, former homeless man, radio personality
