= Briggsdale (Columbus, Ohio) =

Neighborhood of Columbus, Ohio

Coordinates: 39°55′33″N 83°03′30″W

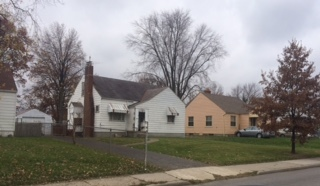
Typical homes in Briggsdale

Interactive map of the neighborhood

Briggsdale is a neighborhood of Franklin County in the city of Columbus, Ohio. The neighborhood is on the west/southwest side of the city within the Hilltop area. The area was first settled and founded by the family of Joseph M. Briggs, after whom the neighborhood was named. Joseph Briggs was an active figure in the early years of the township and county operations. The Briggsdale Methodist church was founded with his help, and it now exists as the New Horizons Methodist Church. The present-day Briggsdale neighborhood is located near the historical Green Lawn Cemetery to the north as well as Briggs High School to the west.

== History ==
=== Family history ===
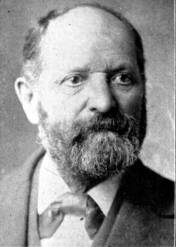
Joseph M. Briggs

Joseph M. Briggs was born on November 25, 1833 to Nicholas Joseph Briggs and Martha J. Chambers in Columbus, Franklin County, Ohio. Joseph M. Briggs was raised on the family's home farm and attended Ohio Wesleyan University, where he met his wife Louisiana Ransburgh, who was 17 years old at the time, 16 years younger. They married October 16, 1867. Briggs died August 31, 1913, of a fractured rib. He and his wife, who died from choking on brandy in 1950 while hospitalized at Mount Carmel for bronchial pneumonia, are buried alongside each other at Green Lawn Cemetery on Sullivant Avenue just north of the present-day Briggsdale neighborhood.

Joseph M. Briggs was a prominent and influential citizen of Franklin Township. He served as the township accessor prior to serving as treasurer for six years. In 1880, he was elected as county commissioner then reelected in 1883 for a total of six years. While county commissioner, Briggs activated several substantial county improvements including the construction of the Broad Street and State Street bridges. Beginning in 1887, he served as the postmaster of Briggsdale. Briggs was also a member and trustee of the Briggsdale Methodist church to which he contributed funding for the new building. In addition to his service for the county, Joseph Briggs possessed a lot of high-value property in the city of Columbus including 27 residences from which he accumulated great wealth from renting.

Louisiana Ransburgh, wife of Joseph M. Briggs, became a historic cultural figure of the area known as the ″Veiled Lady of Champ Chase.″ Each year, in the cover of the night, Louisiana slipped out of the house donning dark clothing and a veil and placed flowers on the graves of confederate soldiers buried at the Camp Chase Confederate Cemetery (also known as the Green Lawn Cemetery). Louisiana's efforts helped clean up the forgotten and overgrown cemetery grounds.

== Geography ==
The present-day neighborhood is bounded by Briggs Road, Eakin Road, and Hopkins Avenue on the north, Brown Road on the east, Demorest Road on the west, and Clime Road on the South. The current neighborhood covers about 0.04 square miles. Briggsdale is approximately five miles outside of downtown Columbus. The neighborhood is located nearby Harrisburg Pike (Route 62) and the passenger railroad tracks operated by the Columbus and Xenia Railroad.

== Transportation ==
The Briggsdale neighborhood is serviced by the COTA bus Grove City Local Lines #3 and #9 . This line runs along Harrisburg Pike.

== Structures and landmarks ==
=== New Horizons Methodist Church ===
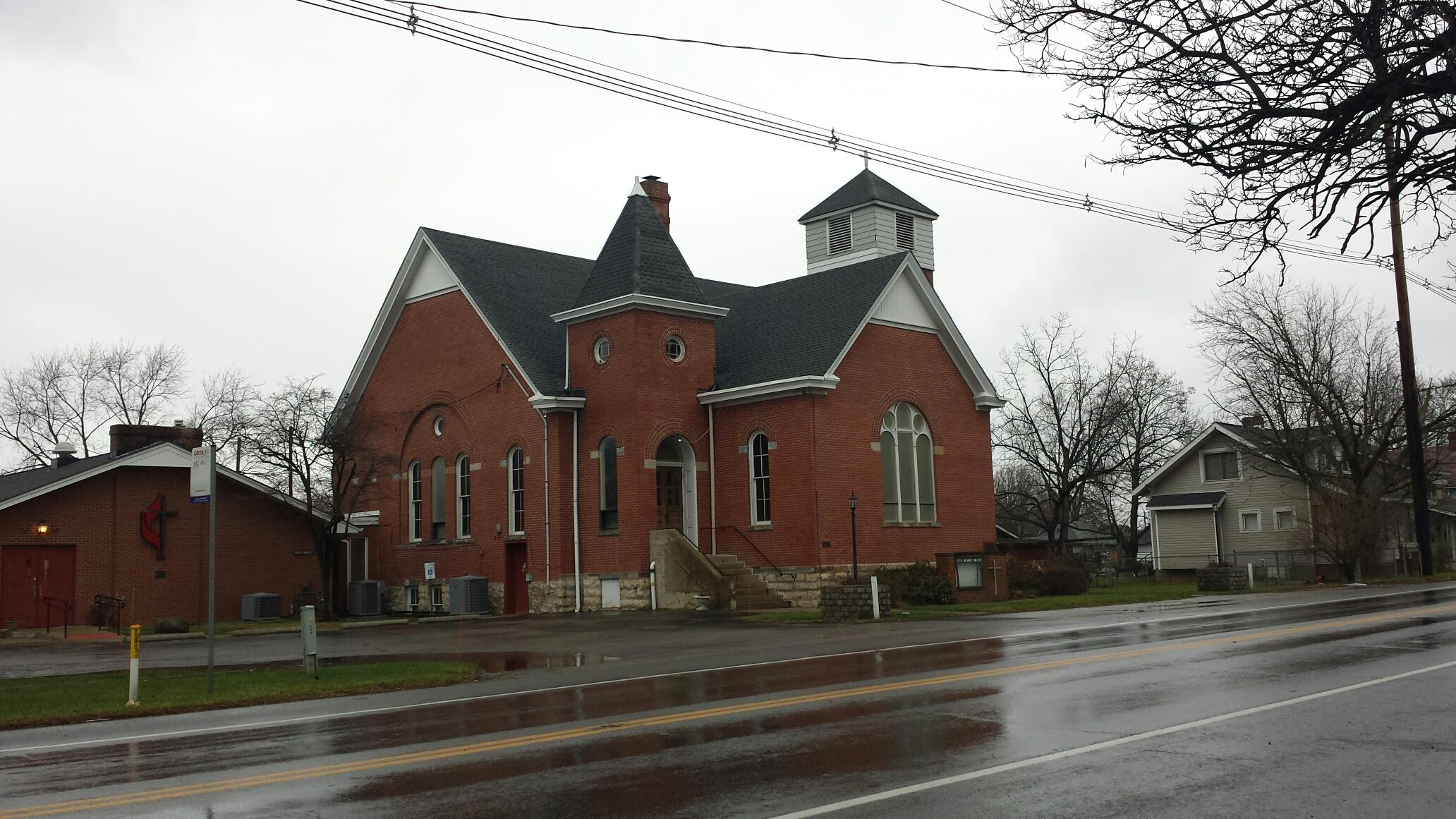
New Horizons Methodist Church

Originally a pioneer class of Methodism meeting in a community member's home, the Briggsdale Methodist Church began in 1822. The meetings moved to a log house on land donated by the family of Samuel White. The log house was replaced by a brick building in 1844 and later another building in 1902 to accommodate the growing congregation. The church was forced to close in 1917 but reopened in 1924. Then in 1928, the original structure burned down. The main sanctuary was rebuilt in 1929 by W.S. Brown. In 2001, the Briggsdale Church merged with the Salem Heights Methodist Church of Grove City, Ohio, to form the current New Horizons United Methodist Church.

New Horizons Methodist Church is a red brick building located on Harrisburg Pike near the southern edge of Briggsdale. The Briggsdale Apartments complex is across the street from the church. New Horizons continues traditions from the historical Briggsdale Church congregation such as the Chicken and Noodle Dinner originating over 50 years ago.

=== Briggs Mart ===
Briggs Mart is a small convenience store located on Briggs Road down the street from the High School.

== Residential ==
=== Briggsdale Apartments ===
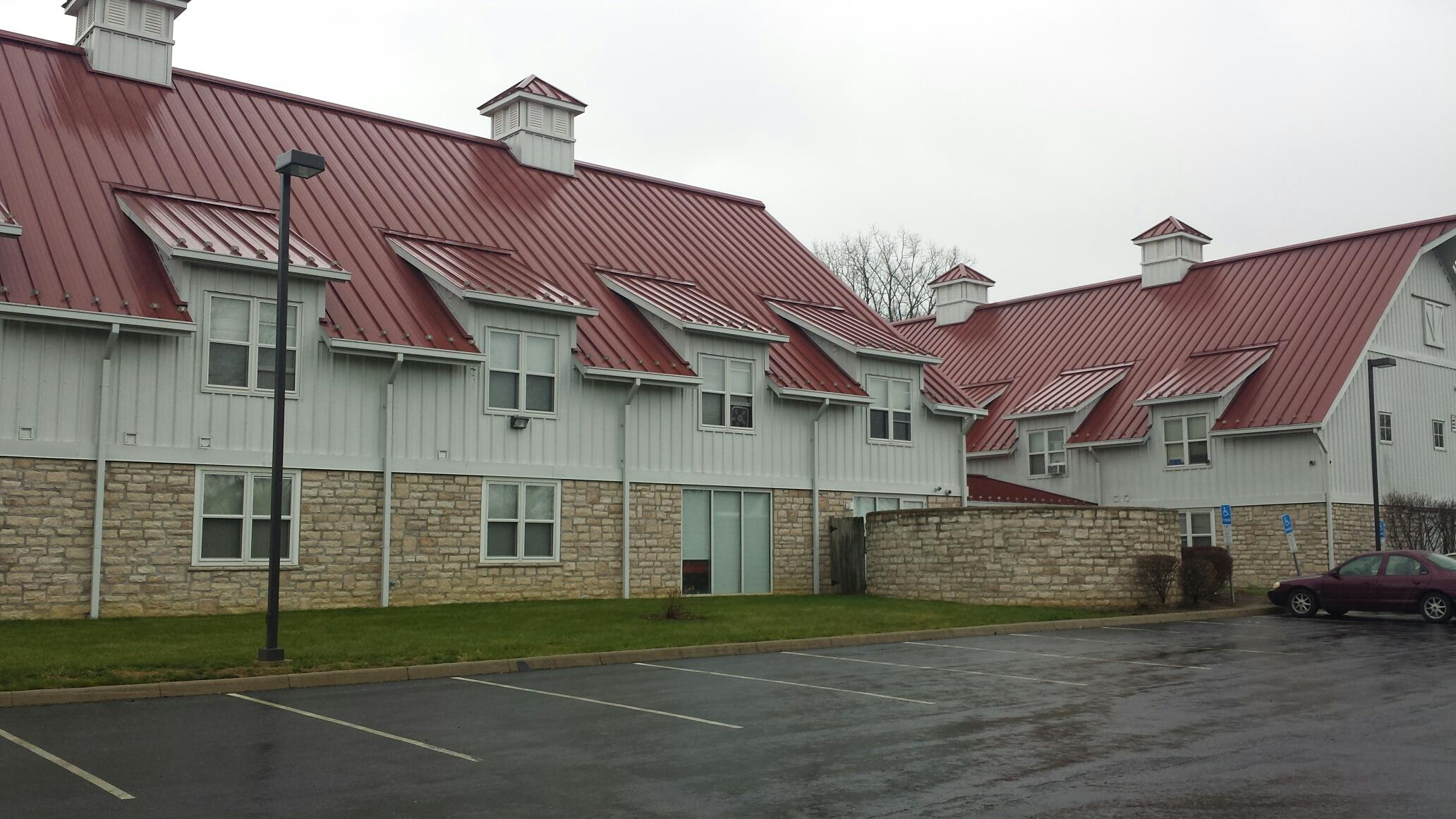
Briggsdale Apartments Community Housing Network

The Briggsdale Apartments are a built aspect of the Rebuilding Lives Program, a community effort to end chronic homelessness in Franklin County. Opening in March 2006 for occupancy, the apartment complex was developed and is owned and operated by the Community Housing Network. The construction cost under $4 million and took place from July 2005 to February 2006. The project received large community support through funding from the Ohio Housing Finance Agency, HOME funds from the city of Columbus, Franklin County, and HUD. The apartments are supportive single room occupancy (SRO) units for individuals disabled by mental illness, afflicted by substance addiction, or have experienced a history of chronic homelessness. The complex consists of two buildings designed to look like farm residences in the spirit of the original Briggs farm. The apartment complex is located at 1670 Harrisburg Pike, Columbus, Ohio. The location was selected because of its proximity to public transportation, convenience shopping and employment opportunities for the residents. The apartments include 35 SRO units, a community space, computer lab for resident use and offices for 24-hour staffing. The Community Housing Network works in conjunction with the Southeast, Inc. to provide the apartment residents with supportive services such as mental health and chemical dependency counseling and budgeting education.

== Education ==
=== Briggsdale School ===
The school building, located on Harrisburg Road, was built in 1909 but since then has been demolished.

=== Briggs High School ===
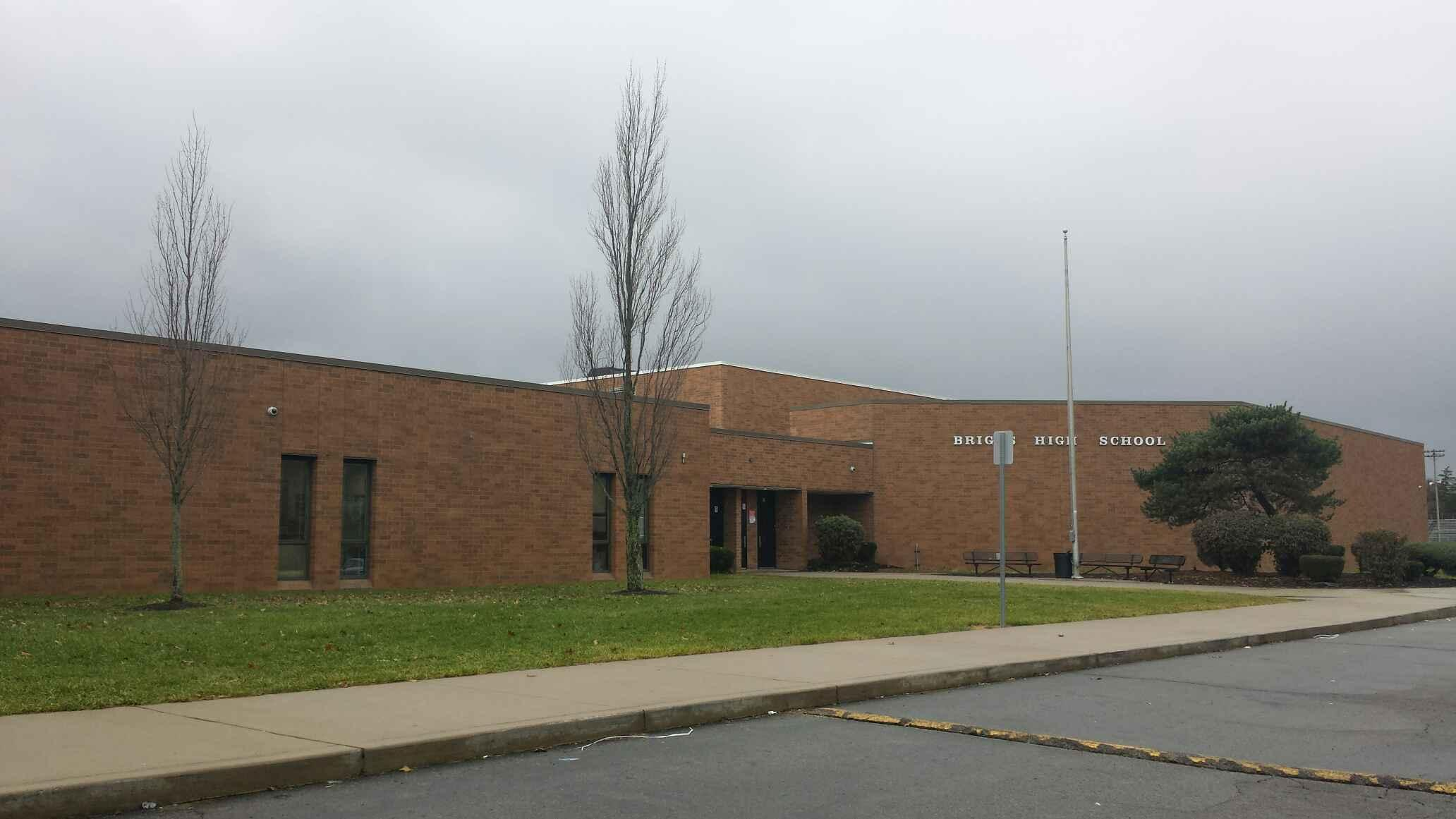
Briggs High School

Briggs High School, located northwest of the neighborhood on Briggs Road, is part of the Columbus City Schools network. The public school accommodates grades 9-12. The school colors are purple and gold, and the sports mascot is the Bruin. Briggs High School offers traditional CCS college preparatory curriculum as well as Advanced Placement courses and special elective courses.

== See also ==
- Neighborhoods in Columbus, Ohio
