= Berwick (Columbus, Ohio) =

Berwick, Ohio
- Neighborhood of Columbus
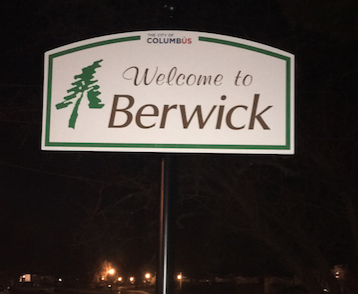
- Welcome sign by S. James Rd and Scottwood Rd
- Interactive map of Berwick, Ohio
- Coordinates: 39°56′24″N 82°55′35″W
- Country: United States
- State: Ohio
- County: Franklin
- City: Columbus
- ZIP Code: 43209
- Area code: 614

Berwick is a residential neighborhood located on the east side of Columbus, Ohio. It is one of the most unique neighborhoods in Columbus with mid-century homes, wide winding streets, and a "suburban" feel. Berwick is characterized by its warm nature and welcoming community atmosphere, as well as its diverse population, including significant numbers of African American and Jewish citizens. The median household income is higher than the state average at $84,173, and the average household net worth is $509,793. The median age of residents is 46. Notable Columbus citizens, including Heisman Trophy Winner Archie Griffin and Columbus Mayor Michael B. Coleman, have resided in the area.

== History ==
Berwick is built on land owned by Emil Ambos, a Columbus businessman who purchased the land for his "pleasure ground." Homes started being built in Berwick in 1927. In 1932, the Berwick Construction Company began building the Berwick Golf Course, roughly from Berwick Ave. south to Scottwood Rd., with homes along the golf course.Within a few years of the completion of the project, the town experienced a population boom at the beginning of the 1950s. In 1955, the eastern part of the golf course was developed for additional housing. Berwick Elementary was built in 1956 at 2595 Scottwood Rd.

A few years after this population boom, the neighborhood experienced some racial tension. Bruce Black, former president of the Berwick Civic Association states, "The neighborhood had some racial growing pains in the early 1970s as African-American families migrated to the area. Some white families moved, fearing their property values would plummet."

In 2015, Berwick garnered national attention as a result of a recent scandal involving Bob Hsieh, an employee of the Columbus Development Department. Hsieh was accused of dishonesty, misuse of property and failure of good behavior after he helped Jianhua Li, a Chinese businesswoman, purchase Columbus Mayor Michael B. Coleman’s Berwick home; an act committed without the authorization of his business. He hired lawyers, established bank accounts, and paid someone to maintain the property in an effort to make the house more desirable.

== Geography ==
Berwick is situated between Interstate 70 and Bexley, Ohio. The border of Berwick is Livingston Avenue to the North, James Road to the East, and Interstate 70 to the South and West. The population is currently set at 4,322 according to the 2015 census

Most of the neighborhood is relatively flat. The area contains many spacious ranch houses and suburban streets that weave around the remains of the Berwick Golf Course and through the neighborhood.

Berwick is roughly nine square miles. The town is located four miles east of downtown Columbus, providing Berwick residents with a close commute to downtown.

== Culture ==
This neighborhood has grown since 2009 because of its diverse mix of cultures, affordable housing and overall location in relation to the rest of the metropolitan area. The population according to census 2015 data rose from 4,160 in 2009 to 4,322 in 2015.

A recent analysis of the population of Berwick by Realtor.com stated, "70% of people are married and 30% of people are single. The percent of people married is 2% lower than the ratio of Columbus Metro at 72%. In Berwick, the male-to-female ratio is 1,918 to 2,405, which is 17% lower than the ratio of Columbus Metro at 979,841 to 1,013,818. Age demographic data is sourced from census, 2015."

TAT Ristorante di Famiglia, which was opened in 1929 on the corner of college and Livingston Avenues, claims to be the oldest Italian restaurant in the city. Another well-known restaurant located in Berwick is simply called "The Berwick."

Located nearby in downtown Columbus, there are three downtown theaters – the Ohio Theater, The Columbus Palace Theatre, and the Southern Theater. The theaters are all live venues that host musicians, stand-up comedians, off-Broadway productions, and symphonies, and other events.

== Residential ==
It is slightly cheaper to live in Berwick rather than the city of Columbus because the cost of living is lower by three percent. In addition to that, housing costs are also ten percent lower than the rest of Columbus. The average cost of a one-bedroom apartment is approximately $660 per month, compared to an average of $765 per month in Greater Columbus. As of 2015, over 1,800 homes have been built in Berwick.

Recent studies have shown that Berwick is a much safer area than many of the other neighborhoods of Columbus. An analysis of crime in Columbus based on 2015 census data showed that, "Berwick has 36% less property-based crime than Columbus, and is 68% above the national average. Berwick also claims 20% less personal crime than Columbus and when compared to that of the United States average, Berwick experiences 54% less personal crime."

== Education ==
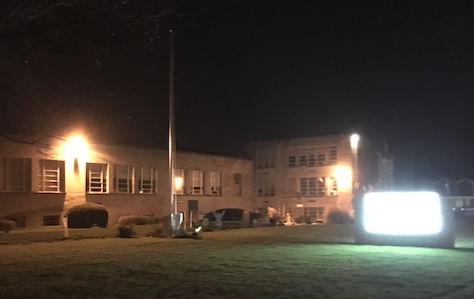
All Saints Academy

Berwick's educational system is split between local schools and the larger Columbus City School District. Schools located in Berwick include Berwick Alternative K-8 School and All Saints Academy, a private kindergarten through eighth-grade school with about 275 students, located at 2855 E. Livingston Ave. in the neighborhood.

In Berwick, 13% of residents 18 and over graduated with only a high school diploma and 47% completed a bachelor's degree or higher, which is 10% higher than that of Columbus Metro.

== Transportation ==
The main form of transportation in this area is driving, as most of the residents own cars. Another alternative is walking along the sidewalks. Some areas do not have sidewalks, so walking is typically reserved to certain areas. There are no bike lanes, so cyclists will have trouble traveling through the neighborhood.

The Columbus metropolitan is very accessible for drivers via Route 33 on the west side of the neighborhood. Route 33 and Interstate 70 connect with each other, allowing the driver to go east or west.

One other option a resident has is taking the COTA bus, which offers $2.00 one way passes across town and $4.50 full day passes.

== Landmarks and structures ==
Berwick Park (south of Berwick neighborhood), a four-acre park tucked away in a quiet neighborhood street, is one notable landmark in the community. The open field provides residents with a quiet place to relax, take a walk, or read. The park often hosts many cultural and educational events.

== Gallery ==
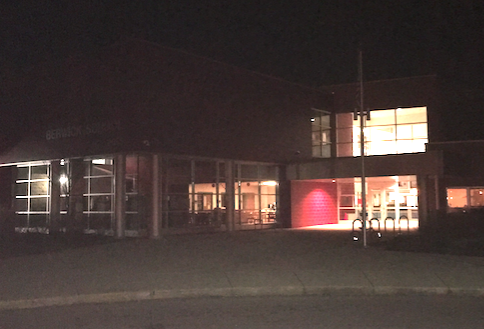
Berwick Alternative K-8

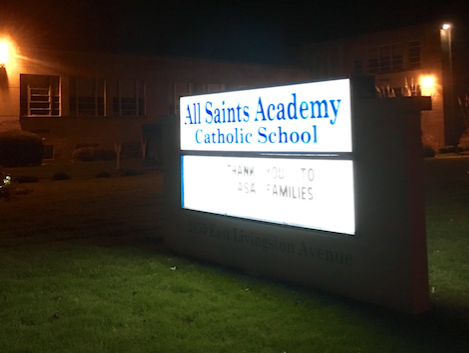
"Welcome Sign" in front of All Saints Academy
