= Southern Orchards =

- Neighborhood of Columbus, Ohio
- Interactive map of Southern Orchards
- Coordinates: 39°56′47″N 82°58′25″W
- ZIP Code: 43206
- Area code: 614

Southern Orchards is an established neighborhood near the south side of Columbus, Ohio. It is located immediately southeast of downtown and is the 23rd most walkable neighborhood in Columbus with 3,538 residents. The neighborhood is the target of revitalization and beautification largely due to its anchor institution Nationwide Children's Hospital and a renewed interest in urban living in the city's core. Since 2008, more than 90 properties have been improved through the hospital's Healthy Homes program and continued revitalization is occurring along the major streets of Livingston and Parsons Avenues as the city moves to reconnect downtown to its surrounding neighborhoods.

== History ==
The first development in the Near Southside Area was the city's land purchase of what is now Livingston Park in front of Nationwide Children's Hospital in 1839. Initially used as a graveyard, the graves were relocated and the land was developed into Livingston Park in 1885. What is now Nationwide Children's Hospital was founded in 1892. By the mid-1870s, land south of Livingston was subdivided into streets and lots. One of the early subdivisions to develop was Swayne's Addition at the corner of Parsons and Livingston Avenues. Wager Swayne served in the American Civil War and rose to the rank of Major General. Beck Street was originally called Swayne Street before it was changed; however, Wager Street still remains. The new subdivision developed quickly, and within 20 years the neighborhood expanded further, with parcels east of 22nd Street given the name Olde Orchard in the county auditor's records. In time, the area became known as Southern Orchards, to differentiate itself from the Olde Orchard neighborhood being developed at the time southeast of what is now John Glenn Columbus International Airport.

== Geography ==
=== Boundaries ===
Southern Orchards is bounded by East Livingston Avenue to the north, East Whittier Street to the south, Studer Avenue to the east, and Parsons Avenue to the west. The area includes 7 primary road corridors as identified through the 1993 Columbus Thoroughfare Plan –Livingston Avenue, Whittier Street, Parsons Avenue, Ohio Avenue, Champion Avenue, Lockbourne Road and Fairwood Avenue. Interstate 70 also follows the northern border of the planning area before it turns south between the Norfolk Southern Railway and Alum Creek.

=== Land Use ===
The Livingston Avenue and Parsons Avenue corridors consist of predominantly commercial, office, and multifamily development. A majority of the neighborhood remains single-family residential units.

==== Residential ====
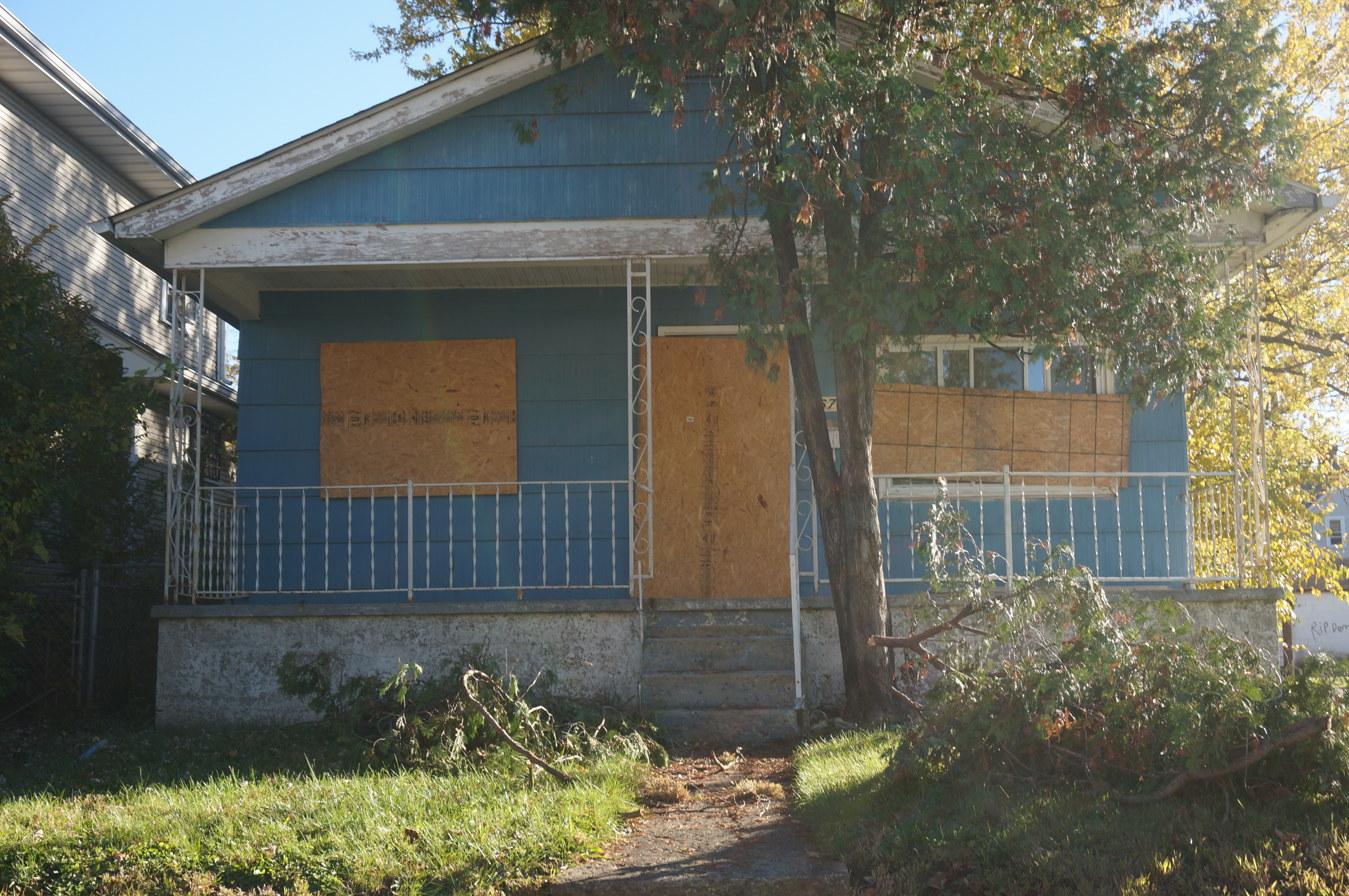
Vacant housing

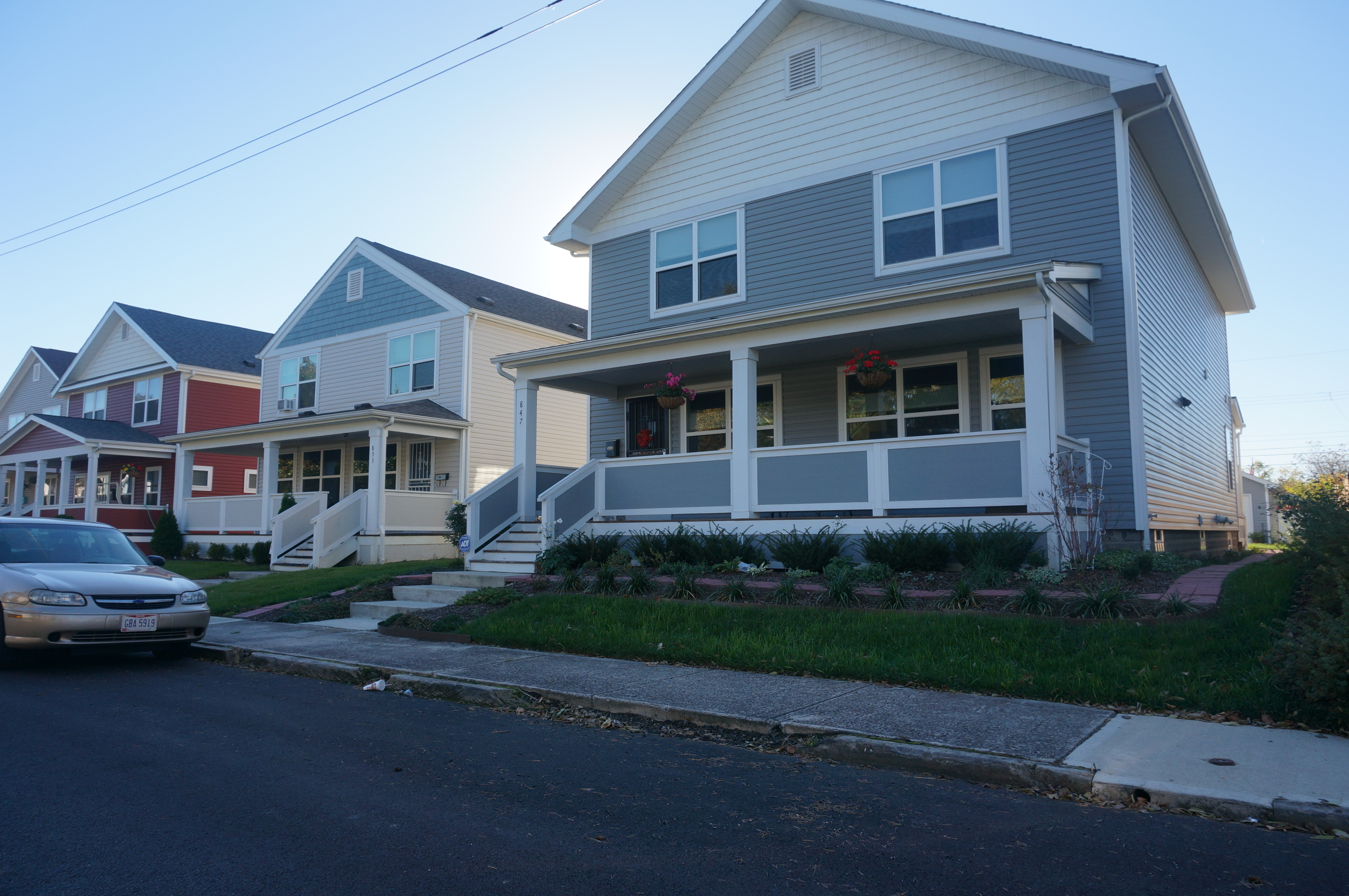
New housing

Home vacancy is a major problem within the area; in 2012, over 369 of the homes in the neighborhood were vacant, indicating over a 20% vacancy rate. Much work has gone into revitalizing the area and building new homes due to the efforts of the mayor and his team, Nationwide Children's Hospital, and several other donors. In 2012, the Urban Infrastructure Recovery Fund Program included the Southern Orchards Civic Association for the Proposed Project List. Total funding of $270,000 was used to improve Martin Park with walkways, benches, trees, fencing and playground equipment and to construct curb ramps on Whittier Street between Wilson Avenue and Wager Street. Multifamily zoning is located along Whittier Street and Livingston Avenue.

==== Commercial ====
Parsons Avenue and portions of Livingston Avenue have the Urban Commercial Overlay (UCO) zoning designation. The UCO does not address land use; it focuses on protecting the unique architectural and aesthetic characteristics of older urban commercial corridors and encourages pedestrian-oriented development featuring retail display windows, reduced building setbacks, rear parking lots, and other pedestrian-oriented site design elements. Parsons Avenue is in the Neighborhood Commercial Revitalization (NCR) district. The program's goal is to stimulate business development along designated NCR areas. The NCR program offers technical assistance, loans and matching grants, capital improvements and planning services in conjunction with the established business association in six commercial areas surrounding downtown. CVS Pharmacy, Aetna Building Maintenance, E-Jay's Drive Thru, Revol Wireless, Mezmerize, Crazy Chicken, Papa John's, and Nexcel/FoodMart are some businesses located in the neighborhood. Grocery stores in the Southern Orchards include Little's IGA (supermarkets). In 1999, the Free Store on Parsons Avenue opened, which accepts donations and distributes clothes and household items to the area's poor. By the end of this year, 150,000 people will have walked through its doors since it opened. Community Development for All People is affiliated with the United Methodist Church and was incorporated as a nonprofit community-development corporation in 2003. The city then designated it as the community housing-development organization for the area so it could receive federal funding.

== Revitalization ==
From Parsons to Linwood, the Southern Orchard neighborhood has multiple blocks with brick homes vs. wood-frame houses. Locals are attempting to revitalize Southern Orchards neighborhood, as immobile cars, some even sitting on cinder blocks, are spread throughout the area. The neighborhood group that is leading the change is the Southern Orchards Civic Association, led by President Rachel Robinson and Vice-president Elaine Dollenmayer.

=== Southern Gateway Initiative ===
The Southern Gateway Initiative began as a private investment by local neighborhood champions to revitalize the near south side area with new housing, health and wellness facilities, and upgraded neighborhood infrastructure. Over $5.7 million in private dollars was raised towards the initiative and the City of Columbus invested $18 million more dollars to rehabilitate homes and upgrade even more infrastructure.

=== Southside Home Ownership Program ===
The Southside Home Ownership Program oversaw the renovation of 14 houses in the Southern Orchards area. The renovated homes were vacant and sold as owned homes. Eligible buyers had an income below 80% of the median area income. Grants were used to subsidize the homes and provide down payment assistance.

=== Healthy Homes ===
Church and Community Development for all People (CD4AP) teamed up with Nationwide Children's Hospital in 2008 to form the Healthy Neighborhoods, Healthy Families (HNHF) Realty Collaborative, with the intent to rehabilitate, repair, and build homes within a 38 block area to the immediate south and east of the hospital's main campus. The goal of Healthy Homes is to continue making improvements on homes throughout the community over a 5-year period.

=== Livingston Avenue Area Commission (LAVA-C) ===
Boundaries:

- North: I-70
- East: Alum Creek
- South: E. Livingston/ E. Whittier Street
- West: Lehman St./Kennedy Dr.

Commission Meetings take place on the third Tuesday of each month at 6:30 pm at the St. John's Learning Center located at 640 S. Ohio Ave.

== Structures & Landmarks ==
=== Livingston Park ===
Livingston Park, located north of Southern Orchards, is the oldest piece of park property in the City of Columbus and is listed on the list of Nationally Registered Historic Landmarks.[14] Plant Pride on Parsons', beautification efforts began in 2010.[15] Plant Pride on Parsons is a community greening partnership developed to assist revitalization of the historic Parsons commercial corridor by abating litter and graffiti and creating a botanical gallery of hand-painted flowering containers and nature-scape murals.[16]

=== Children's Hospital Campus ===
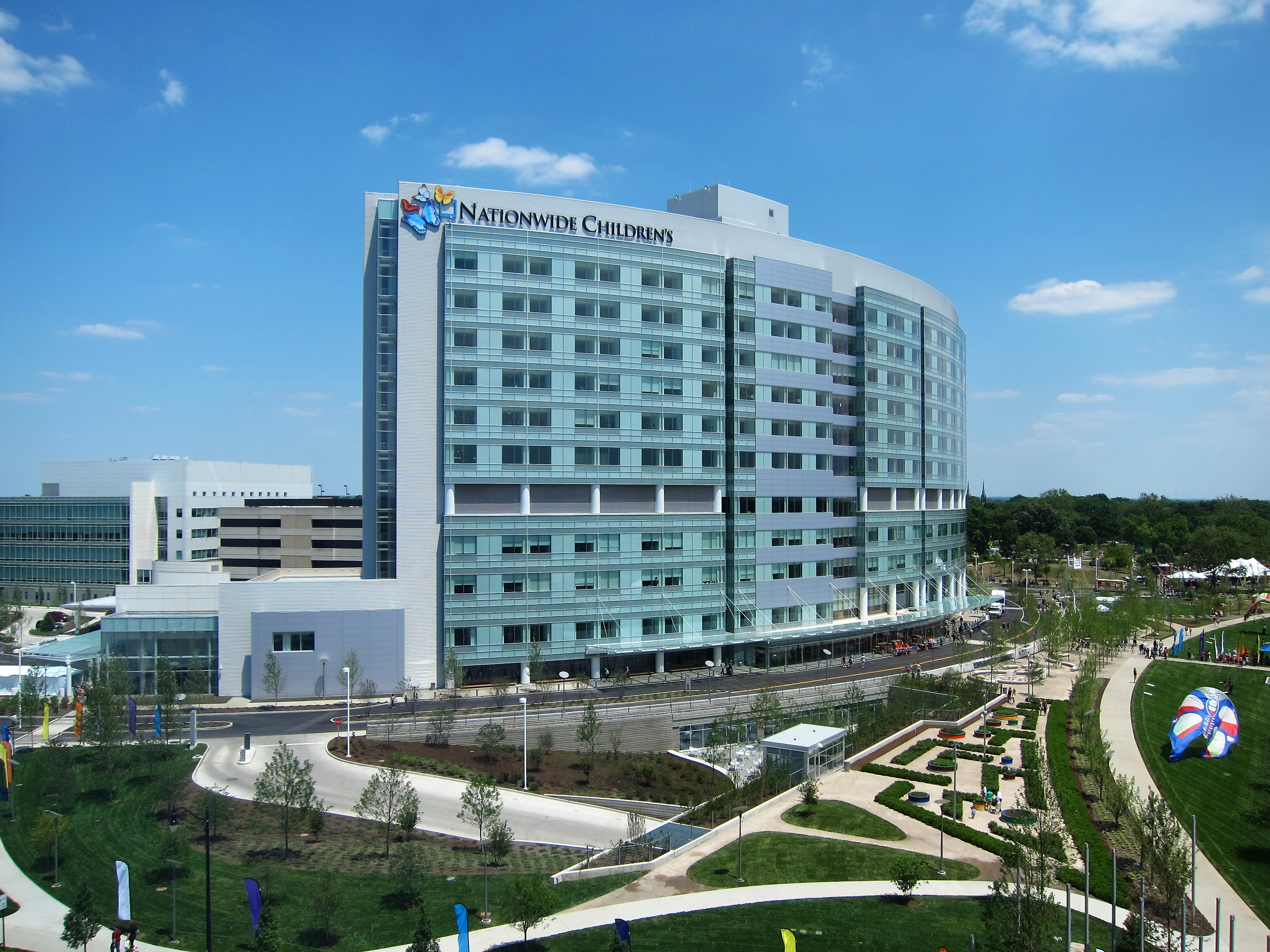
Nationwide Children's Hospital

Nationwide Children's Hospital is the fourth largest children's hospital in the country serving over 37 counties in Ohio. The hospital has more than 1,100 medical staff members and 9,200 employees with the continued mission of providing medical care to children regardless of their ability to pay. Nationwide Children's completed an $800 million expansion project, which includes a new $480 million main hospital and a performance space for patient activities. The new hospital, which opened in 2012, has all private rooms and a new emergency department. Surrounding neighborhood investment by the hospital includes: 3 to $5 million to buy and renovate up to 50 houses in the area, the establishment of significant green spaces on the hospital campus, and Nationwide Children's Hospital's Research 3 building.

=== Ronald McDonald House ===
The Ronald McDonald House of Central Ohio (RMHC), located in the Southern Orchards, has been serving families of sick children for more than 30 years, providing housing, food, and peace of mind to its visitors. The current building is the second location for the house which is now located on the south side of Livingston Avenue facing Children's Hospital. The current location opened in 2008 with 80 bedrooms and has since expanded by 57 more rooms in 2014 and is one of the largest Ronald McDonald Houses in the nation.

=== Livingston Avenue Elementary School ===
Livingston Avenue Elementary School is located in the area serving Kindergarten through 5th grade. In 2012, because of declining enrollment, nearby Heyl Elementary School was closed.

=== Faith centers ===
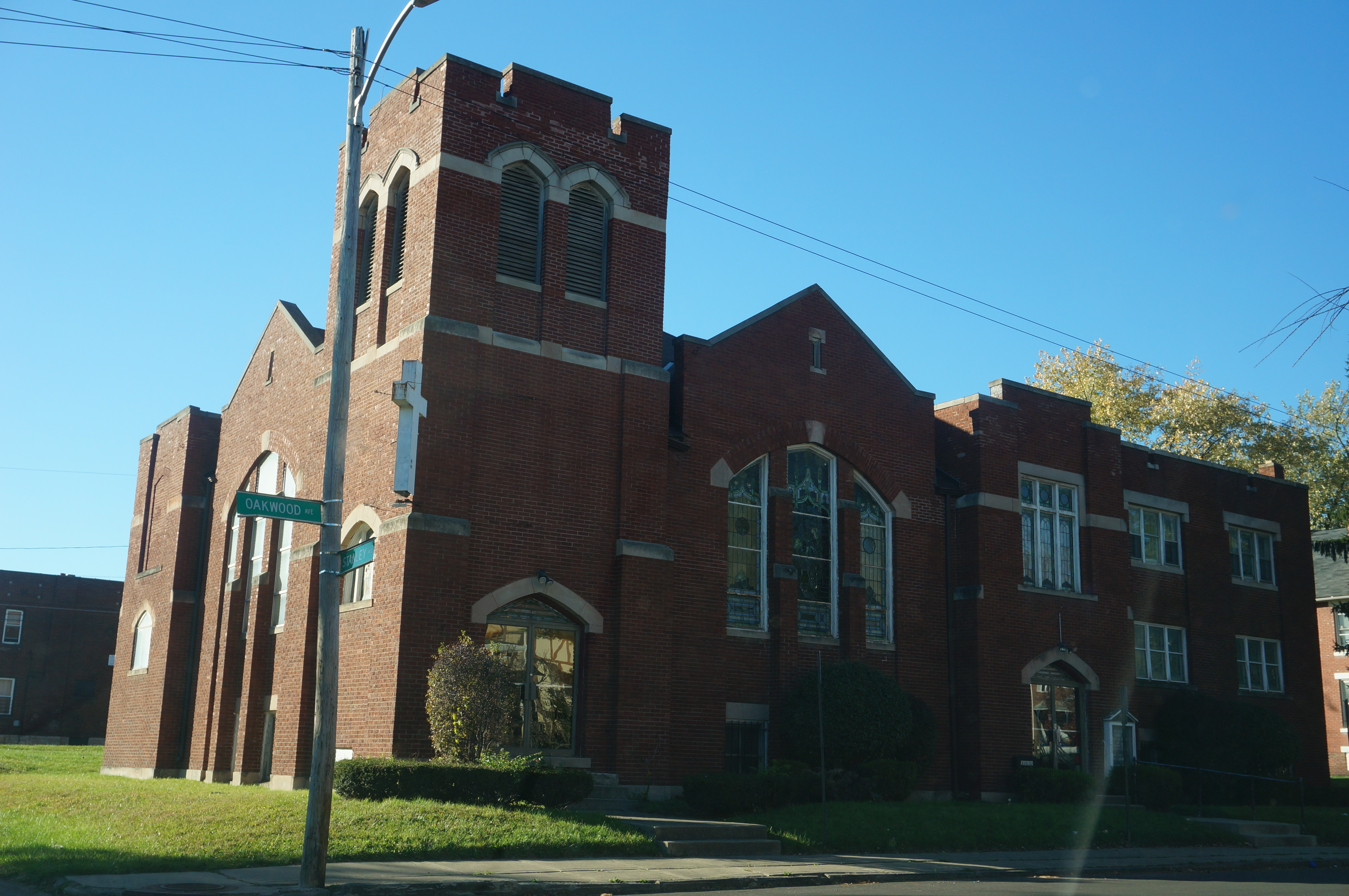
Family Missionary Baptist Church

The Family Missionary Baptist Church and Guiding Light Christian Center are central community centers. They provide faith, recreation, and youth services.

=== Theodore Roosevelt Junior High School ===
Construction of Theodore Roosevelt Junior High School began in 1913 and it was demolished February 11, 1987. The building was a public school that sat at 1046 Struder Ave and served the Near South and Driving Park neighborhoods.

=== Kossuth Street Garden ===
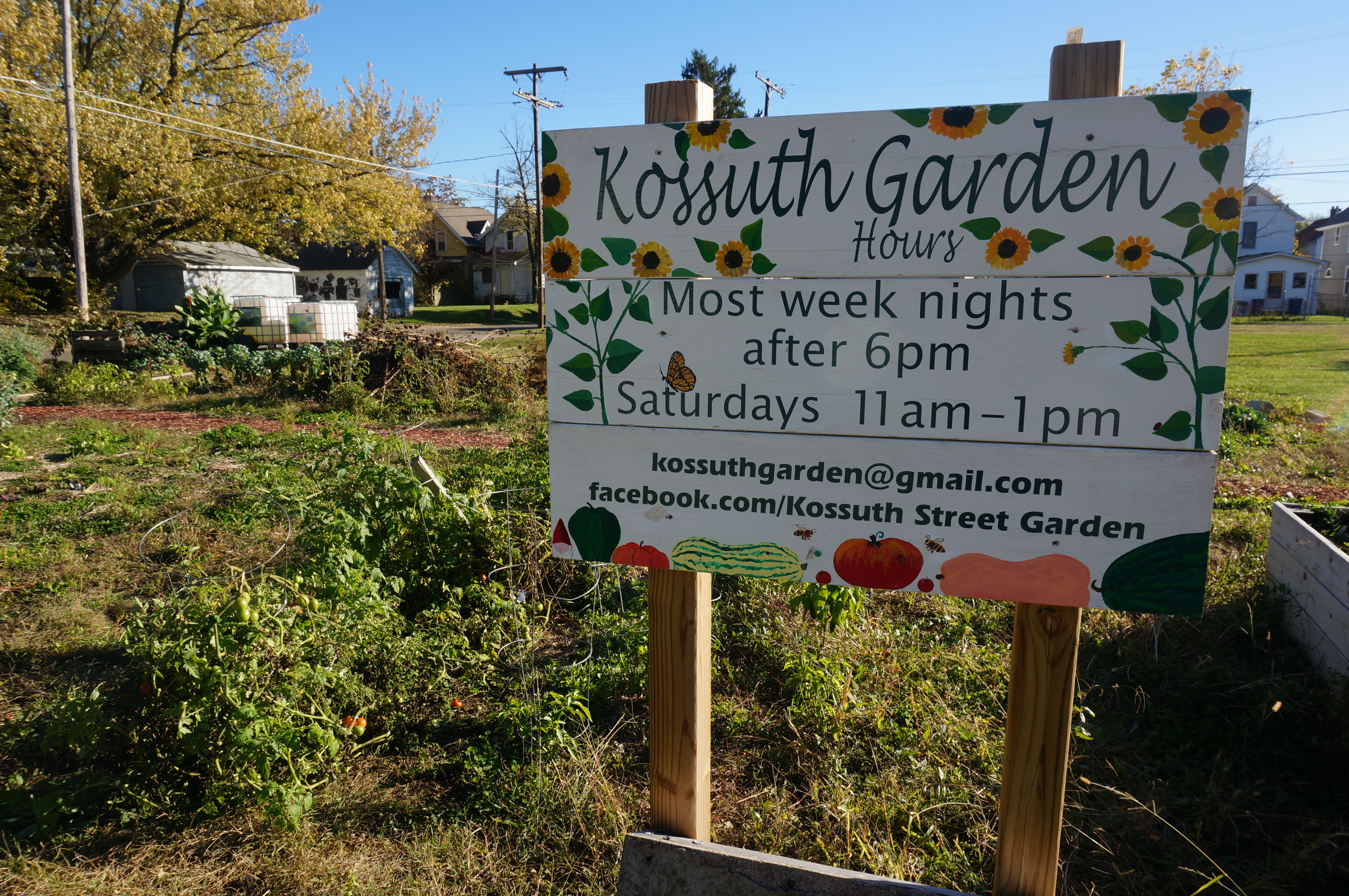
Garden 6

Kossuth Street Garden formerly covered the lot at 641 East Kossuth Street, spanning the space between Ann Street and South 17th Avenue. Founder and director Michael Doody has been serving the community since 2007. In 2023, the garden was removed and construction began on ten single-family homes.

=== Parks and recreation ===
Kobacker Park, located at 570 Kossuth Street, is a .34 acre neighborhood, open-lot park. .

Roosevelt Park, located at 1046 Studer Ave., is a 2.91 acre neighborhood park that includes picnic tables, looping walking path and play equipment for children.

Martin Park, located at 950 Wagner St., is a mowed open lot park.

=== Columbus Library Branches ===
Columbus Metropolitan Library branches near the area include the Driving Park Branch, which is located in the northeastern portion of the planning area at Kelton and Livington Avenues, and the Parsons Avenue Branch, located just southwest of the planning area at the corner of Stewart and Parsons Avenues.

== Transportation ==
To help address the gaps in the sidewalk infrastructure, the city of Columbus plans to construct sidewalks on Whittier Street, between Lockbourne Road and Fairwood Avenue. The recently adopted Columbus Bicentennial Bike Plan suggests several routes to be constructed in the Near Southside Area including Cycling infrastructure. Bike boulevards are recommended for Denton Alley, and East Gates and Kossuth Streets. It recommends bike lanes for Lockbourne Road, and Parsons, Champion, Ohio, and Livingston Avenues. Central Ohio Transportation Authority (COTA) bus service provides a network of coverage in the Near Southside Planning Area. Local routes serve Livingston Avenue, Parsons Avenue, and Whittier Street Line numbers 001, 004, 005. Crosstown routes serve both Ohio and Champion Avenues; Line number 022 The COTA routes connect residents to downtown and to the broader region.
