= Georgian Heights =

Neighborhood in Columbus, Ohio, United States

Coordinates: 39°56′17″N 83°06′32″W

Interactive map of the neighborhood

Georgian Heights is a neighborhood in West Columbus, in Columbus, Ohio, United States. It neighbors Holly Hill. The two are bounded together by Sullivant Avenue on the north, Clime Road on the south, Georgesville Road on the west, and Demorest Road on the east. There is a 10.7 acre public park, Georgian Heights Park, in the center of the area. Georgian Heights has a youth travel football team called the Georgian Heights Packers. The neighborhood is generally lower-middle class.

== Schools ==
Children from Georgian Heights attend Georgian Heights Elementary, Eakin Elementary, Stiles Elementary, and Prairie Norton Elementary. From there they go to Wedgewood Middle School or Norton Middle School, and then to Franklin Heights High School, Briggs High School, Central Crossing High School or West High School.
