= Glen Echo (Columbus, Ohio) =

- Glen Echo Historic District
- U.S. National Register of Historic Places
- U.S. Historic district
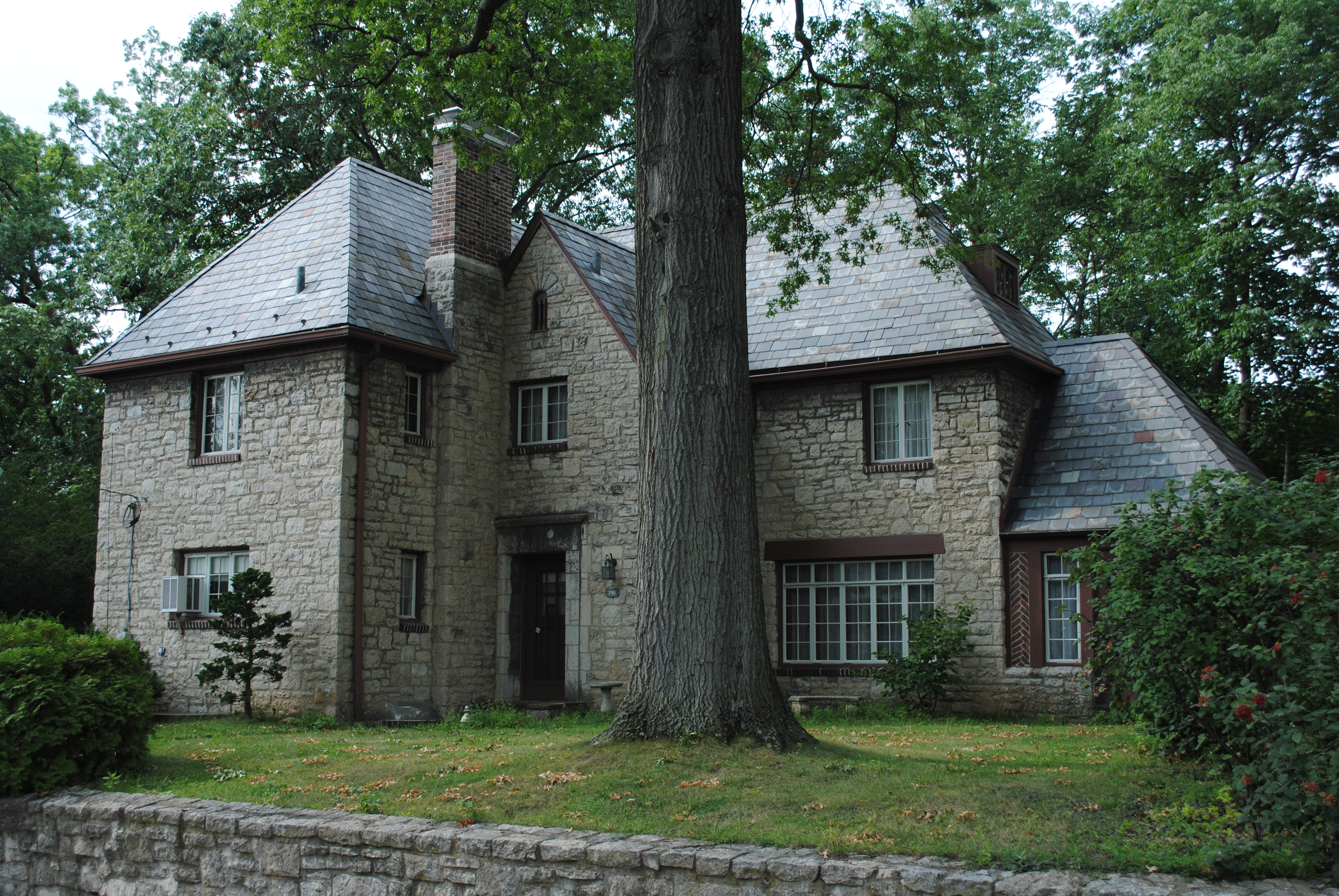
- The Gilbert H. Hamilton House
- Interactive map of the neighborhood
- Location: Roughly bounded by Glen Echo Ravine, Big Four RR tracks, Indianola Ave., and Hudson St., Columbus, Ohio
- Coordinates: 40°1′1″N 82°59′59″W
- Built: 1910
- Architect: Columbus Real Estate & Improvement C; Gregg, Romeo
- Architectural style: Bungalow/Craftsman, Shingle Style, Tudor Revival
- NRHP reference No.: 97001241
- Added to NRHP: October 24, 1997

Glen Echo is a neighborhood located in the far northern part of the University District in Columbus, Ohio. The area was listed on the National Register of Historic Places in 1997. The name Glen Echo refers to Glen Echo Ravine, which runs along the northern edge of the neighborhood. Principal streets in the area are Glen Echo Drive, Summit Street, Glenmawr Avenue, North Fourth Street, Arcadia, Cliffside Drive, and more. One street, Parkview Drive, was platted in the ravine basin, but was later abandoned.

The district originated in 1909 when the Columbus Real Estate and Improvement Company platted 47 acres (19 ha) as "Indianola Park View" for a planned residential subdivision and a part of the Glen Echo Ravine was delineated as a park, the first such donation to the city of Columbus by a real estate developer. The wooded Glen Echo Ravine significantly influenced the original layout, design, and overall character of the district. The neighborhood's developer was also involved with the development of Walhalla Ravine and Eastgate. Prior to its development, the area was considered for a major hospital; however, those plans were abandoned.

A 1909 Ohio State publication described the new north side park as a place of beauty where large oak and elm trees shaded a wading pond, five small lakes connected by a single stream, rustic benches, foot bridges and springs lined with cobblestones. Glen Echo's picturesque environs hosted picnic dinners, equestrians and motorists who enjoyed this oasis of greenery. In 1910 the development was annexed to the City of Columbus and in 1912 Glen Echo Park was dedicated to the city. Glen Echo Park, which is is maintained by Columbus Recreation and Parks department, and has an official address of 530 Cliffside Drive. Visitors can enter the park from the ramp at the intersection of Cliffside Drive and N. 4th St., or via stairs near 530 Cliffside Drive.

Most of the homes in the Glen Echo neighborhood were built between 1909 and 1943 and include American Craftsman style bungalows, Shingle Style, Tudor Revival and Colonial Revival, many with front and/or sleeping porches. Most homes, however are not "high style" structures, and would be classified as either traditional American Foursquare or American Vernacular in style. The homes are a mix of single and double units with a high home-owner occupancy rate. Grassy boulevards are features of Glenmawr Avenue and North Fourth Street; these elliptical islands are classified as parks with the Columbus Department of Recreation. Stone stanchions and street furniture are a hallmark of Glenmawr Avenue. The 1997 listing of the neighborhood on the National Register of Historic Places was made based on the neighborhood's overall fabric as a middle class development, rather than as a collection of high style architecture.

Homes in the neighborhood are kept in good repair. A move by some residents put the question of the neighborhood's leaving the University District up for discussion; however, the city of Columbus does not have a mechanism for detaching neighborhoods from one area Commission and reattaching that area to another commission. The neighborhood is represented by an active 501(c)(3) nonprofit, Friends of Glen Echo, dedicated to protecting and preserving Glen Echo and its natural spaces. Other nonprofits and associations also dedicate volunteer time and resources to Glen Echo's preservation and improvement: FLOW, Friends of the Ravines, and the Glen Echo Bird Club.

== See also ==
- National Register of Historic Places listings in Columbus, Ohio
