= Northwood Park (Columbus, Ohio) =

Historic district in Ohio, United States

Coordinates: 40°00′32″N 83°00′23″W

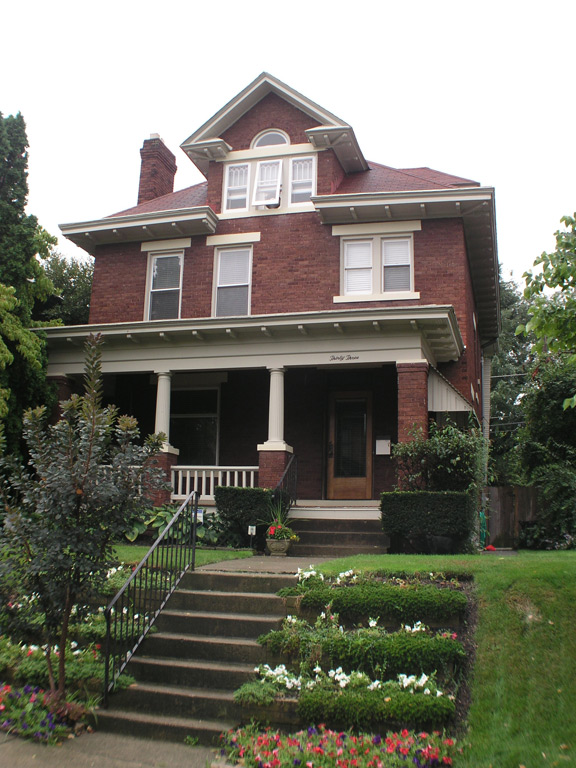
- Contributing property in the neighborhood and district
- Interactive map highlighting the district among other historic sites
- Location: Columbus, Ohio

Columbus Register of Historic Properties
- Designated: February 8, 1989
- Reference no.: CR-45

The Oakland & Northwood Avenue Area (sometimes referred to as Northwood Park) is located in the northern University District in Columbus, Ohio and is bounded by Patterson Avenue to the north and Northwood Avenue to the south & Pearl Alley to the west and Indianola Avenue to the east . It is sometimes considered to go as far north as Blake Ave.

The Northwood & Oakland Avenue Area was settled between the early 1900s and the 1940s, making it one of the first subdivisions to be built on the then "outskirts" of the City of Columbus. The homes are traditionally American Four Square with some Classical, Prairie, Colonial, and Craftsman mixed in to create a unique tree lined neighborhood.

The neighborhood is known for its strong sense of community, large homes, beautiful gardens and brick alleys. It also has a very high percentage of owner-occupancy.

Northwood Park is listed on the Columbus Register of Historic Properties as the Northwood Park Historic District. It was added on February 8, 1989, with the designation CR-45.
