= Flytown =

Human settlement in Columbus, Ohio, US

Coordinates: 39°58′20″N 83°00′34″W

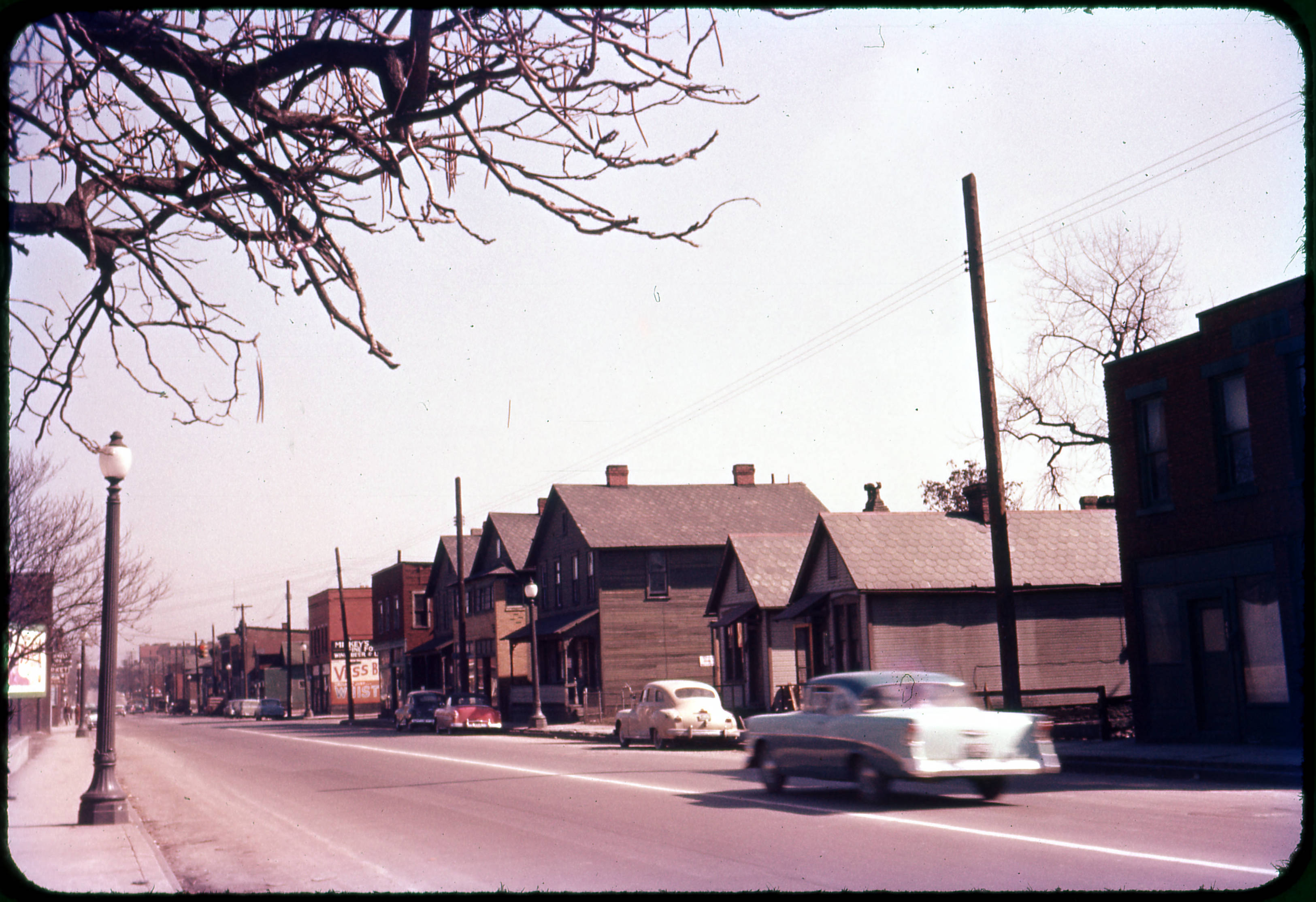
A portion of the neighborhood, approximately 423-471 W. Goodale Street, 1957

Interactive map of the neighborhood's approximate location

Flytown was a neighborhood just northwest of downtown Columbus, Ohio, United States. Flytown encompassed portions of the present-day Arena District and western sections of the Victorian Village. In the 19th century, it was considered the center of the Irish-American community in the city after the arrival of immigrants fleeing the Great Famine, and Naghten Street, now Nationwide Boulevard, was nicknamed the "Irish Broadway".

== Origins ==
Flytown began to spring up in the mid-19th century, when primarily Irish, German, and Welsh immigrants settled in the area to labor in nearby factories. The neighborhood comprised a 25-block area west of Neil Avenue, east of the Olentangy River, and south to a nearby industrial district along the Scioto River. The name "Flytown" resulted from homes which "flew up over night".

Flytown was first laid out in city plots in 1865.

=== Growth ===
As the immigrants moved in, the neighborhood became distinctive. West Goodale Street became its primary artery as commercial establishments took root to cater to the inhabitants, including saloons and shops, and boarding houses sprang up to house the laborers. Naghten Street, now Nationwide Boulevard, became known as the "Irish Broadway" being the center of the Irish-American community in the city. Industrial firms located in the area included Columbus Forge and Iron, Columbus Coop Foundry, the Simplex Foundry, Columbus Coffin Company, Capital City Products, and the Dresser-Ideco Company.

The immigrants went on to become domestic workers, civil servants, small businessman, police and fire officers, and became present in the political class, as well as the legal, medical, and education communities.

==== O'Shaughnessy family ====
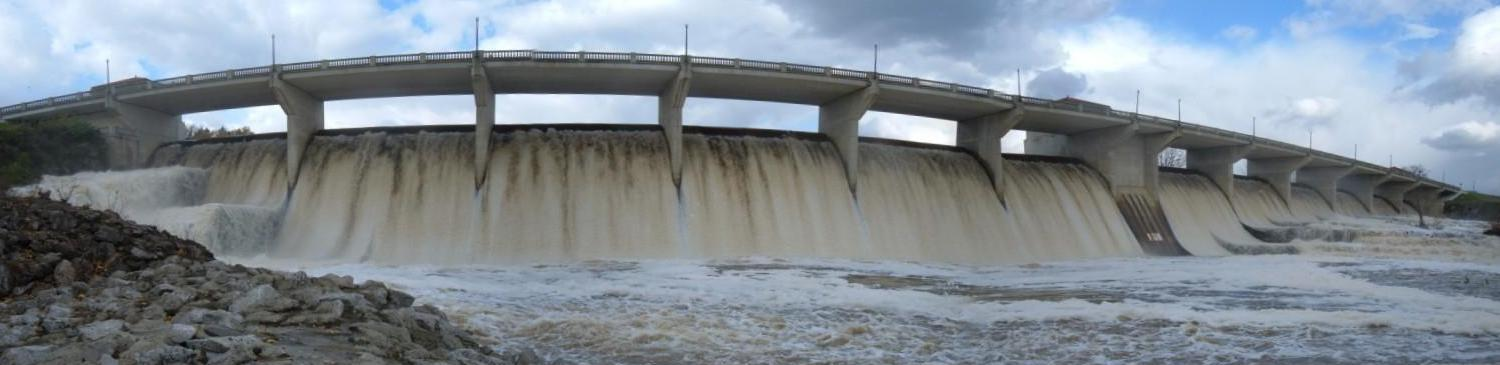
The O'Shaughnessy Dam is named in honor of Jeremiah O'Shaughnessy from Columbus's Irish-American community

Born to Irish immigrants north of Columbus in 1853, Jeremiah O'Shaughnessy began working at age 17 digging the foundation of what would become the city water works, located just west of Flytown. Working his way up to engineer, he eventually became superintendent of the Columbus City Water Works, dedicating much of his life to the city's water system. He would collaborate with the construction of the Columbus Experiment, at the time a revolutionary environmental project and one of the largest water plants built in the United States. In 1913, he pushed a storage dam project, which when completed in 1925, was considered the "best inland city reservoir and dam in the United States." It was named O'Shaughnessy Dam in his honor.

Aside from his water works activities, he would establish O'Shaughnessy Undertaking Co. in 1889, and his descendants, including his grandsons Thomas, Jeremiah, Jr. and Robert Emmet, would go on to become elected officials. Today, the political family is represented by former City Councilmember, Ohio Secretary of State candidate, and Franklin County Clerk of Courts Maryellen O'Shaughnessy, whose father Robert was a state senator and World War II veteran.

O'Shaughnessy's Public House in the Arena District is dedicated to the Irish-American experience in the city and named in honor of the family. It was completed with imported Irish fixtures constructed by local artisans of Irish descent.

=== Melting pot ===
As the Irish immigrants became successful, they moved out. By the late nineteenth century, the neighborhood became a microcosm of America in becoming a melting pot neighborhood. Many Italian and eastern European natives moved in and it became known as a port-of-entry for the immigrants. The St. Francis of Assisi Church was constructed in 1895 on Buttles Avenue to cater to the Irish and Italian immigrants. The Godman Guild House was built for troubled youth in 1898, eventually helping establish the neighborhood's first library, public bath, public gym, and first kindergartens.

==== Racial tensions ====
In the 1910s, many rural southern African Americans fleeing the Ku Klux Klan migrated to the city, settling in the neighborhood and becoming a considerably large population. Many European Americans and some of the African Americans native to the neighborhood moved out and racial tensions began to flare. Segregation became commonplace and enforced at the Godman Guild House, including at their summer resort, The Reservation.

== Decline ==
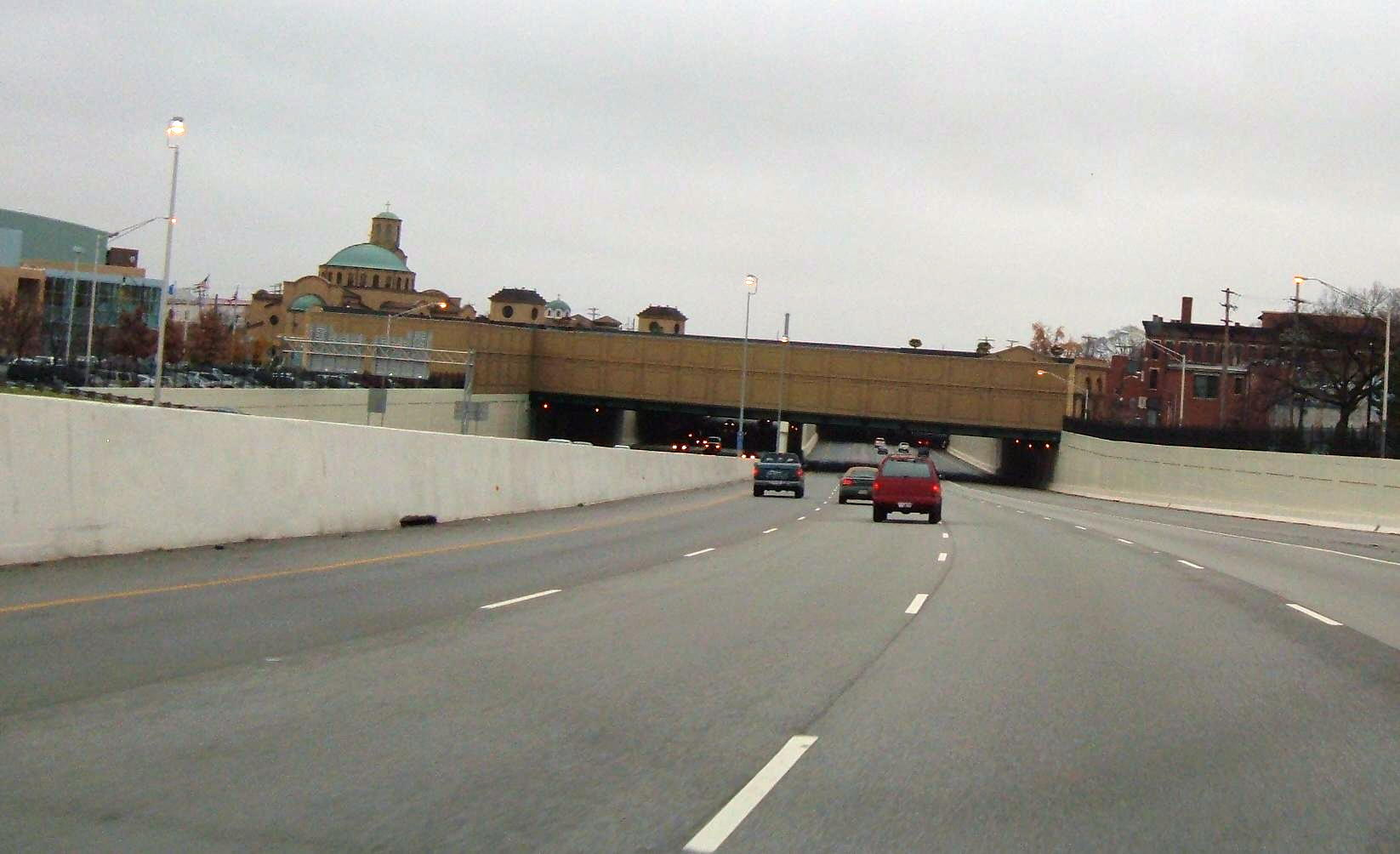
Interstate 670 traveling west, with the Greek Orthodox Cathedral and the Short North Cap in the background.

The neighborhood, considered lower-class, was hit hard by the Great Depression, beginning a cycle of decline. By 1953, the Columbus Redevelopment Authority (CRA) declared the area blighted and a bond was passed to raze much of the neighborhood. The Goodale Expressway, which would eventually become Interstate 670, began construction, resulting in further destruction of the neighborhood as it cut through its heart.

In total, 118 acres (0.48 km^{2}) were cleared, 547 families, 71 individuals, and 73 commercial businesses displaced by the CRA's renewal project.

== Renewal ==
The Goodale Expressway was part of the city's renewal project for Flytown, one of three such projects, which included the Market-Mohawk downtown and Bolivar Arms on the Eastside. The city invested $6 million in what they called Thurber Village in Flytown's place and high-rise apartment complexes sprang up, including Thurber Towers and Westminster Terrace. The Thurber Village Shopping Center was constructed next to these towers. The project helped contribute to the renewal of nearby Victorian Village and the Short North, which was also faced with serious decline.

== Present ==
Today, the neighborhood is rarely referred to as Flytown as neighboring areas have incorporated much of what was Flytown as part of their own. The Victorian Village and Arena District have become some of the city's most attractive neighborhoods, which have included the construction of Nationwide Arena, Huntington Park, commercial facilities, condominiums, and restoration of many homes and manors built from the previous centuries, which survived.

During the construction of Nationwide Arena, many Irish-American immigrant artifacts from the 19th century were unearthed, including dining plates and saucers. O'Shaughnessy's Public House was constructed to honor the former Irish-American center of the city and the Ohio Presbyterian Retirement Services, which operates the apartment towers in Thurber Village, proposed in 2010 a new 14-story, $43-million tower. However, in 2012, the parent company approved construction of only a seven-story, 67-unit building due to be completed in autumn 2015.

An Ohio historic marker at McFerson Commons in the Arena District notes the Flytown neighborhood, as well as a marker in Goodale Park.

=== Culture ===
The Flytown Soul Revue is a local band from city.

Rahsaan Roland Kirk was raised in Flytown.
