= Holly Hill (Columbus, Ohio) =

Area in West Columbus, Ohio, United States

Coordinates: 39°56′12″N 83°05′47″W

Interactive map of the neighborhood

Holly Hill is a neighborhood located in West Columbus, Columbus, Ohio, United States. Holly Hill is a traditional 1960s suburban neighborhood consisting of mostly brick ranch houses and some bi-level houses. The houses range in size from approximately 860 square feet (80 m^{2}) up to 1,500 square feet (140 m^{2}). Holly Hill is located next to Georgian Heights.
