= Gilbert H. Hamilton House =

Historic house in Ohio, United States

- U.S. National Register of Historic Places
- Columbus Register of Historic Properties
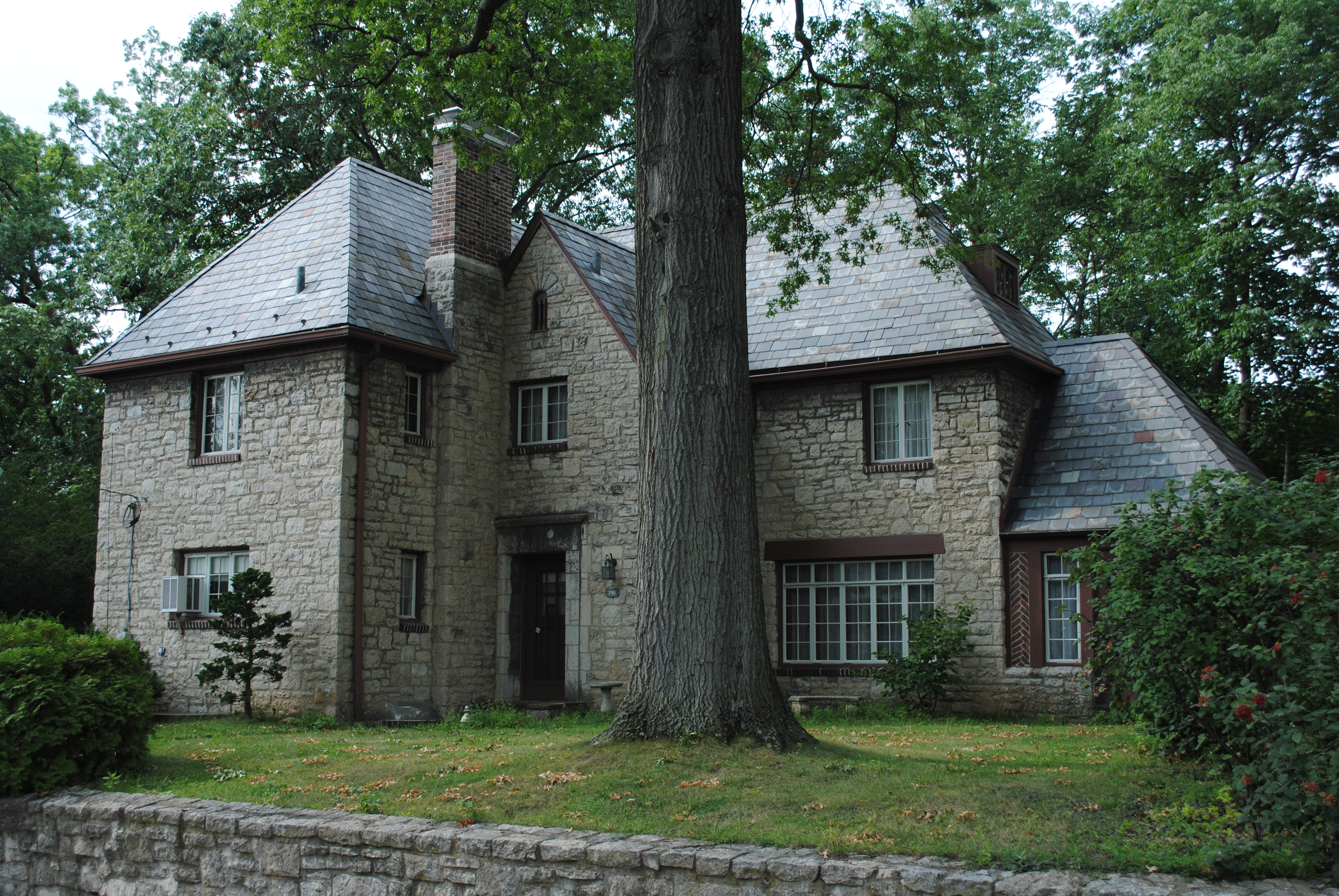
- Interactive map highlighting the building's location
- Location: 290 Cliffside Drive, Columbus, Ohio
- Coordinates: 40.01874°N 83.00438°W
- Built: 1927
- Architectural style: Tudor Revival
- NRHP reference No.: 89000175
- CRHP No.: CR-1

Significant dates
- Added to NRHP: December 16, 1992
- Designated CRHP: July 9, 2018

The Gilbert H. Hamilton House is a historic building in the Glen Echo neighborhood of Columbus, Ohio. It was listed on the National Register of Historic Places in 1992 and the Columbus Register of Historic Properties in 2018. The house, completed in 1927, overlooks the Glen Echo Ravine. It was built for Gilbert H. and Caroline J. Hamilton; the family lived there until 1952.

== See also ==
- National Register of Historic Places listings in Columbus, Ohio
