= Briggs High School (Ohio) =

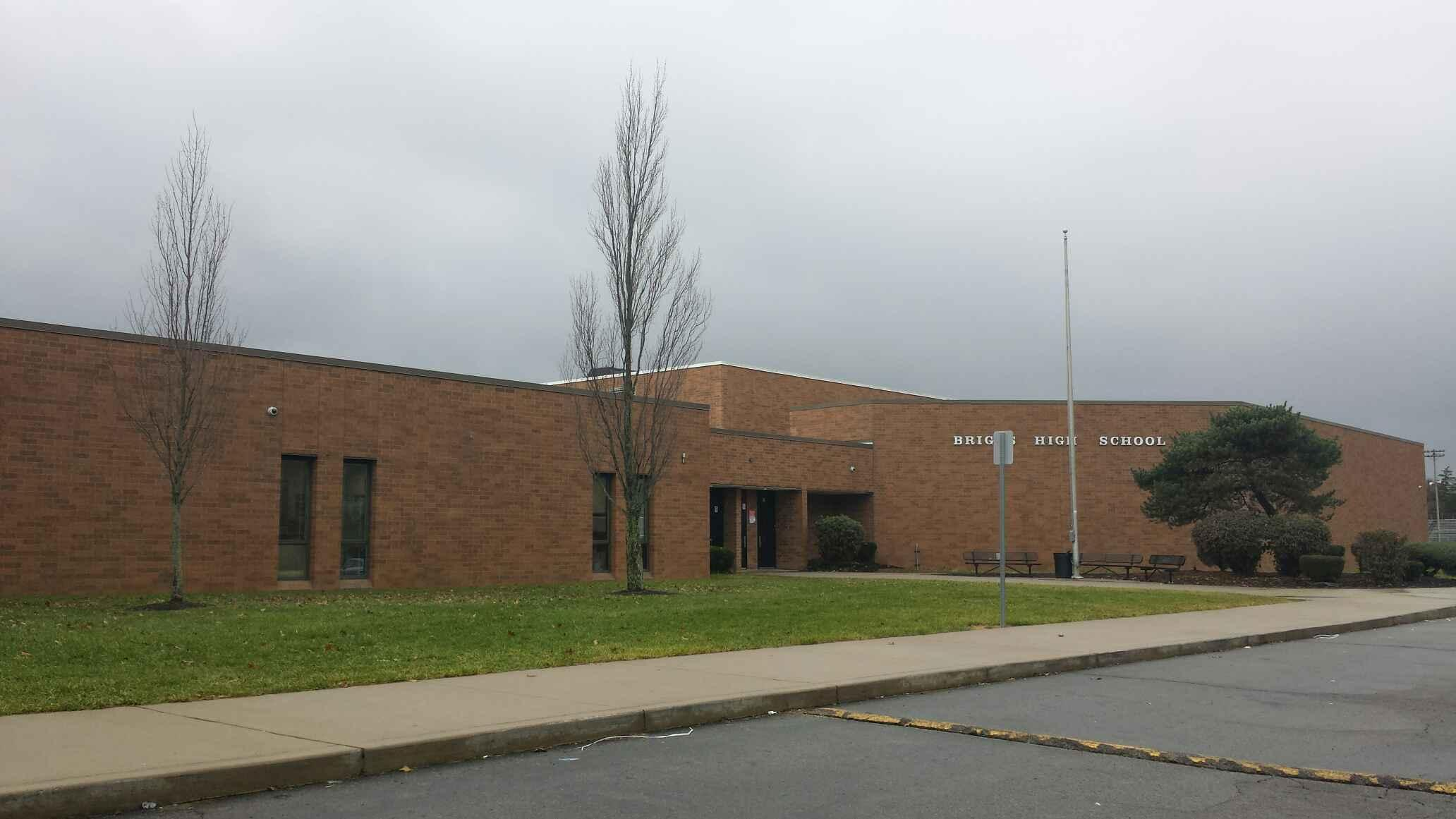

Location
- 2555 Briggs Road; Columbus, (Franklin County), Ohio 43223; United States
- Coordinates: 39°55′41″N 83°3′54″W

Information
- Type: Public high school
- School district: Columbus City Schools
- Superintendent: Angela Chapman
- Principal: Pamela Smith
- Teaching staff: 50.00 (FTE)
- Grades: 9-12
- Student to teacher ratio: 19.52
- Colors: Purple and gold
- Athletics conference: Columbus City League
- Mascot: Bruin Bear
- Team name: Bruins
- Rival: West High School
- Accreditation: North Central Association of Colleges and Schools
- Website: briggshs.ccsoh.us

Briggs High School is a four-year high school (grades 9–12) located on the southwest side of Columbus, Ohio. It is a part of Columbus City Schools. The building was built in 1974.

Briggs' mascot and sports teams are known as the Bruins, and the school colors are purple and gold.

== Notable alumni ==
- Tom Shearn, former MLB player (Cincinnati Reds)
- Ty Howard, Ohio State University defensive back, NFL defensive back (Arizona Cardinals, Cincinnati Bengals)
