= Lepidopilum affine =

Conservation status
- Critically Endangered (IUCN 2.3)

Scientific classification
- Kingdom: Plantae
- Division: Bryophyta
- Class: Bryopsida
- Subclass: Bryidae
- Order: Hookeriales
- Family: Callicostaceae
- Genus: Lepidopilum
- Species: L. affine

Binomial name
- Lepidopilum affine Müll.Hal.

Synonyms
- Hookeria grevilleana Taylor; Hookeria affinis (Müll.Hal.) Müll.Hal.; Lepidopilum grevilleanum Spruce; Lepidopilum undulatum Hampe & Lorentz; Lepidopilum mittenii Müll.Hal.; Lepidopilum obtusulum Müll.Hal.; Lepidopilum pumilum Mitt.; Lepidopilum ambiguum Broth.; Lepidopilum subobtusulum Broth.; Lepidopilum allionii Broth; Lepidopilum antisanense E.B.Bartram; Lepidopilum pulcherrimum Steere

Species of moss

Lepidopilum affine is a species of moss in the family Callicostaceae. It is endemic to Ecuador. Its natural habitat is subtropical or tropical moist lowland forests. It is threatened by habitat loss.
