= Lepidopilum =

Scientific classification
- Kingdom: Plantae
- Division: Bryophyta
- Class: Bryopsida
- Subclass: Bryidae
- Order: Hookeriales
- Family: Callicostaceae
- Genus: Lepidopilum (Brid.) Brid.

Diversity
- 53 species, see text

Synonyms
- Pilotrichum subg. Lepidopilum Brid.; Campylotrichum Sikora; Acamptodous Duby; Puiggaria Duby

Genus of mosses

Lepidopilum is a genus of moss in family Callicostaceae. There are over 50 species in the genus.

== Species ==
This genus includes the following species:

- Lepidopilum affine Müll.Hal.
- Lepidopilum amplirete (Sull.) Mitt.
- Lepidopilum angustifrons Hampe
- Lepidopilum apophysatum Hampe
- Lepidopilum arcuatum Mitt.
- Lepidopilum armatum Mitt.
- Lepidopilum aurifolium Mitt.
- Lepidopilum ballivianii Herzog
- Lepidopilum brevifolium Mitt.
- Lepidopilum brevipes Mitt.
- Lepidopilum caudicaule Müll.Hal.
- Lepidopilum chloroneuron (Taylor) Spruce
- Lepidopilum convallium (Brid.) Mitt.
- Lepidopilum curvifolium Mitt.
- Lepidopilum curvirameum (Müll.Hal.) Paris
- Lepidopilum cuspidans Mitt.
- Lepidopilum diaphanum (Sw. ex Hedw.) Mitt.
- Lepidopilum erectiusculum (Taylor) Mitt.
- Lepidopilum exiguum B.H.Allen
- Lepidopilum filosum Herzog
- Lepidopilum frondosum Mitt.
- Lepidopilum glaziovii Hampe
- Lepidopilum hirsutum (Besch.) Broth.
- Lepidopilum inflexum Mitt.
- Lepidopilum krauseanum Müll.Hal.
- Lepidopilum lastii Mitt.
- Lepidopilum leiomitrium Müll.Hal.
- Lepidopilum leucomioides Broth.
- Lepidopilum longifolium Hampe
- Lepidopilum maculatum Müll.Hal.
- Lepidopilum mniaceum Müll.Hal.
- Lepidopilum mosenii Broth.
- Lepidopilum muelleri (Hampe) Hampe
- Lepidopilum nitidum Besch.
- Lepidopilum niveum (Müll.Hal.) Kindb.
- Lepidopilum ovalifolium (Duby) Broth.
- Lepidopilum pallidonitens (Müll.Hal.) Paris
- Lepidopilum pectinatum Mitt.
- Lepidopilum pergracile Müll.Hal.
- Lepidopilum permarginatum R.S.Williams
- Lepidopilum phyllophilum Broth.
- Lepidopilum polytrichoides (Hedw.) Brid.
- Lepidopilum rupestre Broth.
- Lepidopilum scabrisetum (Schwägr.) Steere
- Lepidopilum stillicidiorum Mitt.
- Lepidopilum subsubulatum Geh. & Hampe
- Lepidopilum subulatum Mitt.
- Lepidopilum surinamense Müll.Hal.
- Lepidopilum tenuissimum Herzog
- Lepidopilum tortifolium Mitt.
- Lepidopilum ultramarginatum B.H.Allen
- Lepidopilum verrucipes Cardot
- Lepidopilum wallisii Müll.Hal.
