= Stenodesmus =

Stenodesmus may refer to:

- Stenodesmus (millipede), a genus of millipedes in the family Xystodesmidae
- Stenodesmus (plant), a genus of mosses in the family Daltoniaceae
