= Franklinton Post Office =

- U.S. National Register of Historic Places
- Columbus Register of Historic Properties
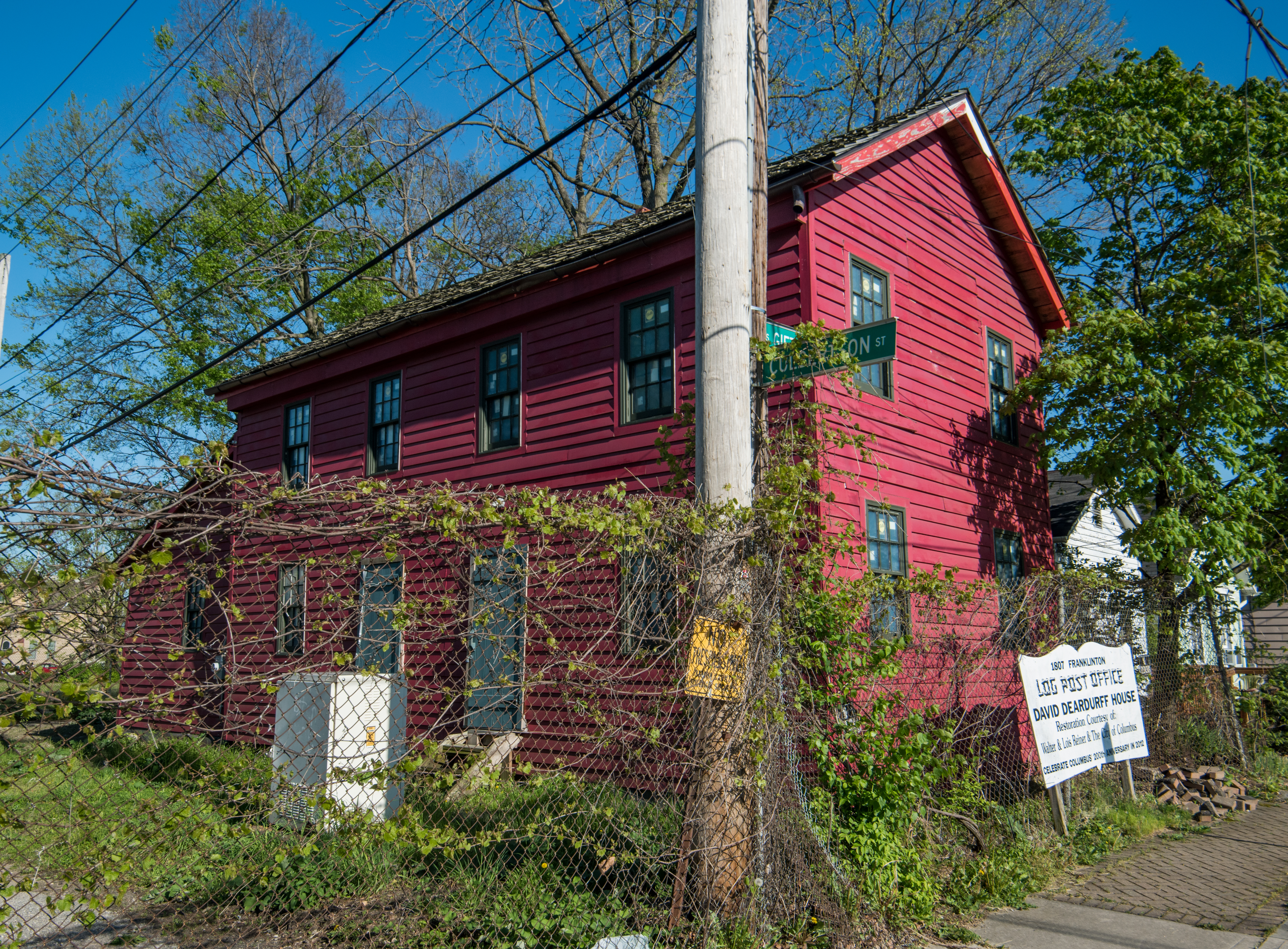
- Interactive map highlighting the building's location
- Location: 72 S. Gift St., Columbus, Ohio
- Coordinates: 39.958883°N 83.015240°W
- Built: 1807
- NRHP reference No.: 73001435
- CRHP No.: CR-56

Significant dates
- Added to NRHP: March 20, 1973
- Designated CRHP: September 18, 2001

The Franklinton Post Office is a historic building in the Franklinton neighborhood of Columbus, Ohio. It was listed on the National Register of Historic Places in 1973. Also known as the David Deardurff House, it was built of hand-hewed logs by Deardurff in 1807. The two-story house sits on a limestone foundation. It is the oldest building in Columbus still on its original foundation. The building is on Gift Street, an area owned by Franklinton founder Lucas Sullivant, given to early settlers. The first post office in Franklinton was established here.

== See also ==
- National Register of Historic Places listings in Columbus, Ohio
