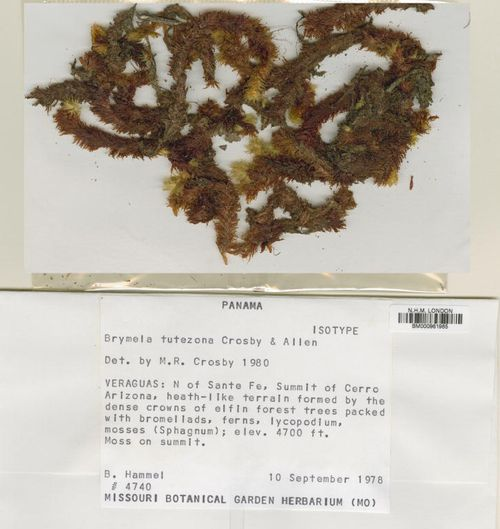
- Isotype specimen of Brymela tutezona

Conservation status
- Critically Endangered (IUCN 2.3)

Scientific classification
- Kingdom: Plantae
- Division: Bryophyta
- Class: Bryopsida
- Subclass: Bryidae
- Order: Hookeriales
- Family: Callicostaceae
- Genus: Brymela
- Species: B. tutezona

Binomial name
- Brymela tutezona Crosby & B.H.Allen

= Brymela tutezona =

Species of moss

Brymela tutezona is a species of moss in the family Callicostaceae. It is a critically endangered species endemic to Panama.

== Distribution and habitat ==
Brymela tutezona is known only from the summit of Cerro Arizona, north of Santa Fe, in the Veraguas Province of Panama. It is an epiphyte that grows on the leaves and branches of trees and shrubs at 890–1,570 m (2,920–5,150 ft) above sea level in elfin cloud forest habitat, growing in the canopy alongside bromeliads, clubmosses, ferns, and other mosses.
