= Franklinton Apartments at State and May =

- U.S. National Register of Historic Places
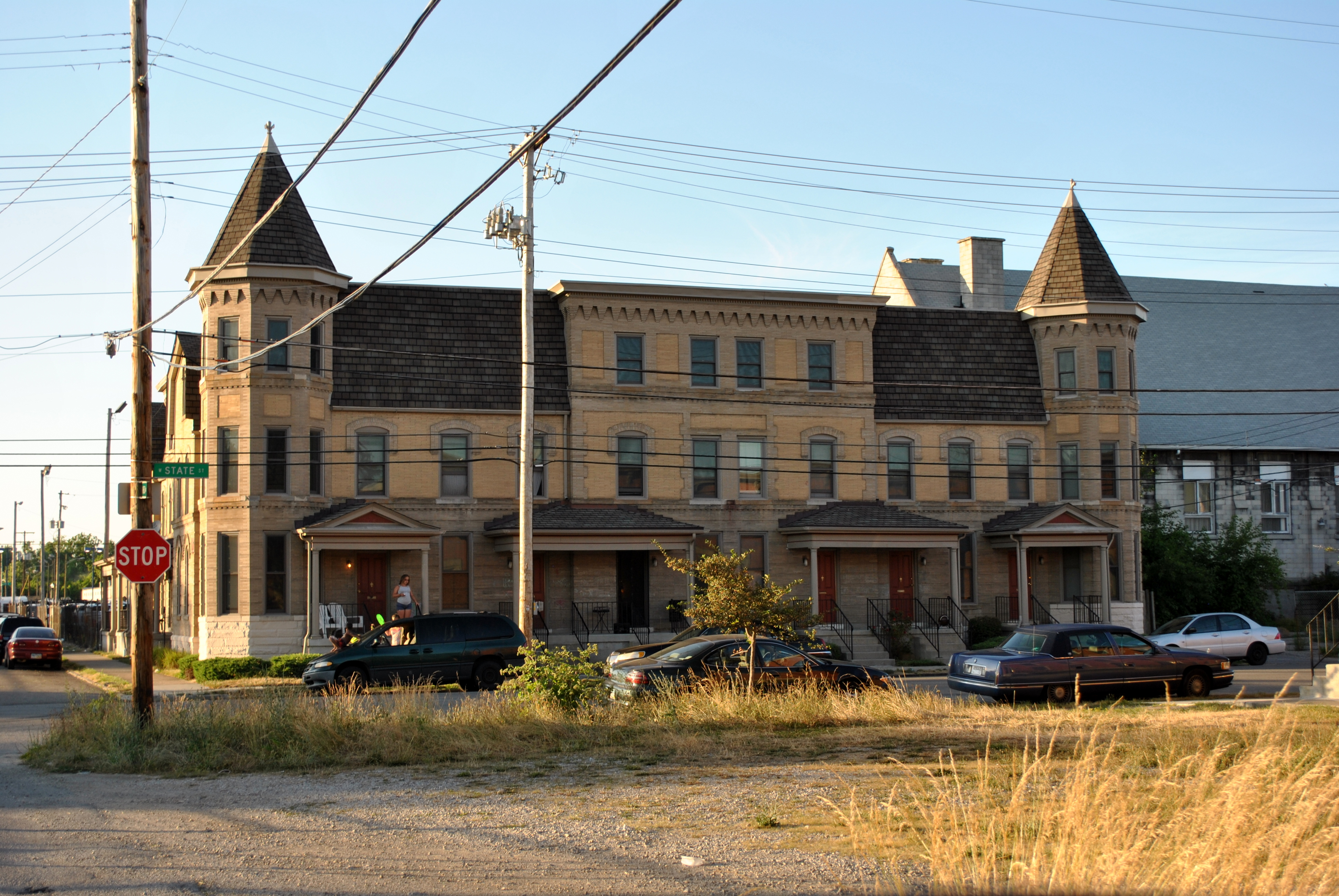
- Interactive map highlighting the building's location
- Location: 494-504 State St., 74-82 S. May Ave., Columbus, Ohio
- Coordinates: 39.958791°N 83.013774°W
- Built: 1900
- NRHP reference No.: 05000027
- Added to NRHP: April 22, 2005

The Franklinton Apartments at State and May is a historic building in the Franklinton neighborhood of Columbus, Ohio. The building was built in 1900 and listed on the National Register of Historic Places in 2005. The building is significant as it represents the neighborhood's residential investment following an industrial boom. It is also one of four L-shaped corner rowhouses built in Franklinton in 1900, and another was built in 1910. It is a defined property type relatively unique to the neighborhood, with only one other known example elsewhere in the city.

== See also ==
- National Register of Historic Places listings in Columbus, Ohio
