= Amblytropis =

Scientific classification
- Kingdom: Plantae
- Division: Bryophyta
- Class: Bryopsida
- Subclass: Bryidae
- Order: Hookeriales
- Family: Callicostaceae
- Genus: Amblytropis (Mitt.) Broth.

Species
- See text.

Genus of mosses

Amblytropis is a genus of moss in family Callicostaceae.

== Etymology ==
The genus name is from the Greek amblys "blunt", "obtuse" and tropis "ship, keel", referring to the petals.

== Species ==
The genus Amblytropis contains the following species:

- Amblytropis gemmacea (Mitt.) Broth.
- Amblytropis hispidula (Mitt.) Broth.
- Amblytropis ovata (Mitt.) Broth.
- Amblytropis setosa (Mitt.) Broth.
