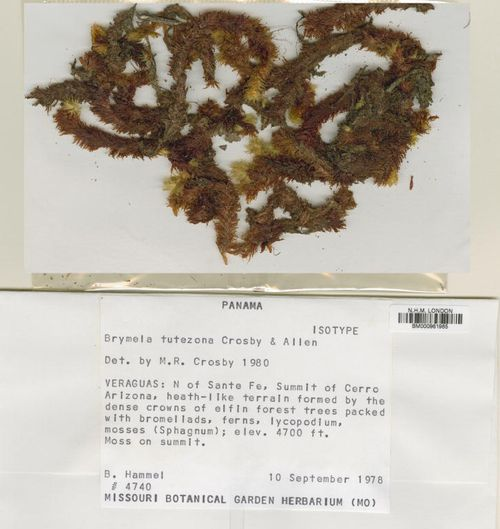
- Isotype specimen of Brymela tutezona

Scientific classification
- Kingdom: Plantae
- Division: Bryophyta
- Class: Bryopsida
- Subclass: Bryidae
- Order: Hookeriales
- Family: Callicostaceae
- Genus: Brymela; Crosby & B.H.Allen

Type species
- Brymela tutezona Crosby & B.H.Allen

Diversity
- 14 species, see text

= Brymela =

Genus of mosses

Brymela is a genus of moss in family Callicostaceae. It includes 14 species native to the Neotropical realm.

== Distribution and habitat ==
Brymela species are restricted to the Neotropical realm, with species distributed in Central America, the Caribbean, and the Tropical Andes of north-western South America. They grow primarily in montane regions.

== Description ==
Plants in the genus Brymela are dioicous mat-forming mosses that may be green, yellowish green, yellowish red, or red in colour. The stems are irregularly branched and yellowish or transparent when young, becoming reddish as they mature. The rhizoids are smooth, reddish brown in colour, and may be sparsely branched or entirely unbranched.

== Species ==
This genus includes the following species:

- Brymela acuminata (Mitt.) W.R.Buck
- Brymela angustiretis (E.B.Bartram) B.H.Allen
- Brymela antioquiana S.P.Churchill & J.J.Atwood
- Brymela cavifolia (Mitt.) Vaz-Imbassahy & D.P.Costa
- Brymela complanata B.H.Allen
- Brymela crosbyi (B.H.Allen) B.H.Allen
- Brymela fissidentoides (Hook. & Wilson) W.R.Buck
- Brymela fluminensis (Hampe) W.R.Buck
- Brymela laevinervis (Renauld & Cardot) B.H.Allen
- Brymela obtusifolia (E.B.Bartram) W.R.Buck
- Brymela parkeriana (Hook. & Grev.) W.R.Buck
- Brymela rugulosa (Mitt.) W.R.Buck
- Brymela tutezona Crosby & B.H.Allen
- Brymela websteri (H.A.Crum & E.B.Bartram) W.R.Buck
