= William Starling Sullivant =

American botanist

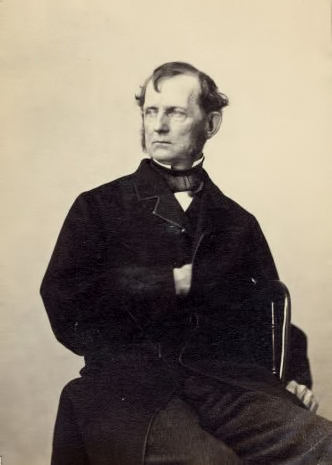
- Sullivant in 1864
- Born: January 15, 1803; Franklinton, Ohio
- Died: April 30, 1873 (aged 70); Columbus, Ohio
- Education: Ohio University
- Alma mater: Yale (Baccalaureate 1823)
- Spouses: Jane Marshall (m. 1824); Eliza Griscom Wheeler (m. 1834); Caroline Eudora Sutton (m. 1851)
- Children: 13, including T. S. Sullivant
- Scientific career
- Fields: Botany
- Author abbrev. (botany): Sull.

William Starling Sullivant (January 15, 1803 – April 30, 1873) was an early American botanist recognized as the foremost authority on bryophytes in the United States.

== Biography ==
Sullivant was the oldest son of Lucas Sullivant and Sara (Starling) Sullivant. He was born in Franklinton, Ohio, a frontier town that had recently been established by his father and which eventually became part of Columbus, Ohio. He was sent to Kentucky for his initial education, then spent a year studying at Ohio University when it first opened in Athens, Ohio. Later he transferred to Yale and received a bachelor's degree in 1823.

The death of his father that same year obliged Sullivant to return home and take over management of the family business. He became a surveyor and civil engineer and successfully invested in mills, stone quarries, canals and other endeavors. He became interested in botany around 1834, influenced in part by his second wife, Eliza Griscom Wheeler. Initially he was interested in flowering plants and in 1840 published A Catalogue of Plants, Native and Naturalized, in the Vicinity of Columbus, Ohio.

Sullivant collected plants throughout the Ohio region and built up a large herbarium with an emphasis on grasses and sedges. He identified and published several new plant species. He became acquainted with other botanists in America, notably Asa Gray and John Torrey. Their support encouraged Sullivant to continue his botanical studies and he turned his focus to mosses and liverworts.

In 1843 Sullivant traveled with Asa Gray through the Allegheny Mountains collecting mosses. He presented his findings in a bound two-volume folio, Musci Alleghanienses (1845, 1846), containing dried specimens of the mosses he had collected along with accompanying text in Latin for each species. He also authored the sections on mosses and liverworts in Gray's Manual of the Botany of the Northern United States (1848). Sullivant's contribution was later published separately under the title, The Musci and Hepaticae of the United States, east of the Mississippi River (1856).

He was elected as a member to the American Philosophical Society in 1862.

In 1864 Sullivant published his most important work, Icones Muscorum, containing 129 illustrations and descriptions of the mosses indigenous to eastern North America. The breadth of this work and the excellent illustrations cemented Sulivant's reputation as the pre-eminent American bryologist of his time. With Leo Lesquereux, he published two editions of an exsiccata work called Musci Boreali-Americani Quorum Specimina Exsiccata (1856, 1865).

He contracted pneumonia and died in Columbus on April 30, 1873. He had been working on a supplement to Icones Muscorum which was completed in 1874 by his colleagues, Leo Lesquereux. Lesquereux and Thomas P. James also completed his Manual of Mosses of North America in 1884.

During his career Sullivant had named and described 270 species of bryophytes and had gained worldwide recognition as the preeminent authority on North America mosses and related plants. He built an herbarium of some 18,000 moss specimens which were donated to Harvard University. The Sullivant Moss Society was named in his honor and later became known as the American Bryological and Lichenological Society.

He married three times: Jane Marshall in 1824, Eliza Griscom Wheeler in 1834 and Caroline Eudora Sutton in 1851. His second wife Eliza was a botanical collector and it was she who collected the holotype specimen for the genus Sullivantia. He had thirteen children with his three wives. His son, T. S. Sullivant, was the influential cartoonist published in Life and other magazines.

== Works ==
- A Catalogue of Plants, Native and Naturalized, in the Vicinity of Columbus, Ohio (1840).
- Musci Alleghaniensis (1845,1846).
- Contributions to the Bryology and Hepaticology of North America (1846, 1849)
- The Musci and Hepaticae of the United States, east of the Mississippi River (1856)
- Icones Muscorum (1864)
- Supplement (to Icones Muscorum) (1874) (posthumously completed by Leo Lesquereux and Asa Gray)
- Manual of Mosses of North America (1884) (posthumously completed by Leo Lesquereux and Thomas P. James)

== Bibliography ==
- Gray, Asa (1875). "Biographical Memoir of William Starling Sullivant" (PDF). Biographical Memoirs. National Academy of Science.
- Smith, Annie Morrill (1905). "William Starling Sullivant. January 15, 1803-April 30, 1873". The Bryologist. 8 (1): 1–3. doi:10.2307/3238449. JSTOR 3238449.
- Sterling, Keir B., ed. (1997). Biographical Dictionary of American and Canadian Naturalists and Environmentalists. Greenwood Press. pp. 763–765.
