= Franklinton (Columbus, Ohio) =

Neighborhood in Columbus, Ohio

- Neighborhood
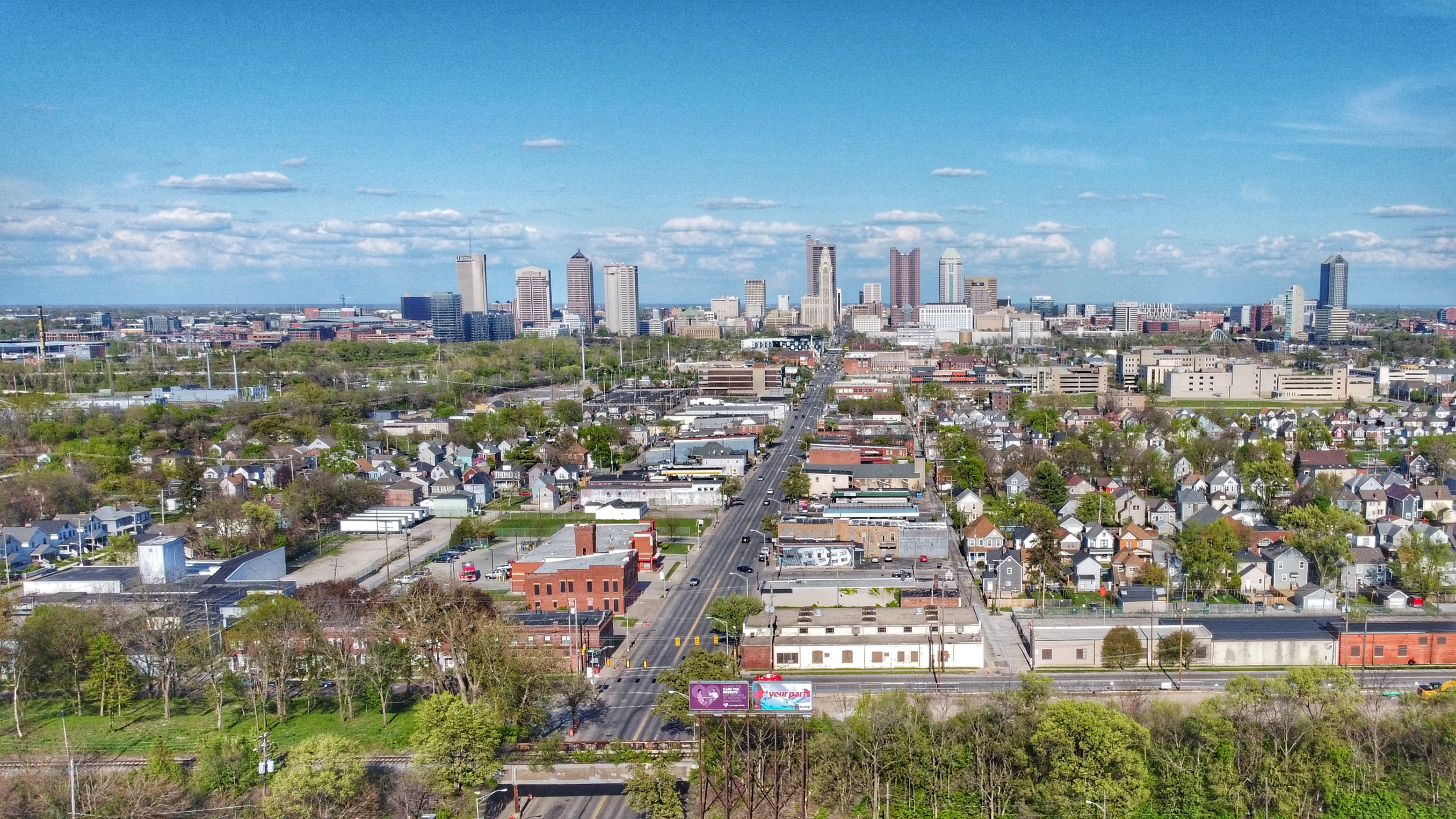
- Franklinton centered on Broad Street, west of Downtown
- Interactive map of Franklinton
- Coordinates: 39°57′15″N 83°01′37″W
- Country: United States
- State: Ohio
- County: Franklin
- City: Columbus
- Founded: 1797
- Founder: Lucas Sullivant
- ZIP Code: 43215, 43222, 43223
- Area code: 614/380

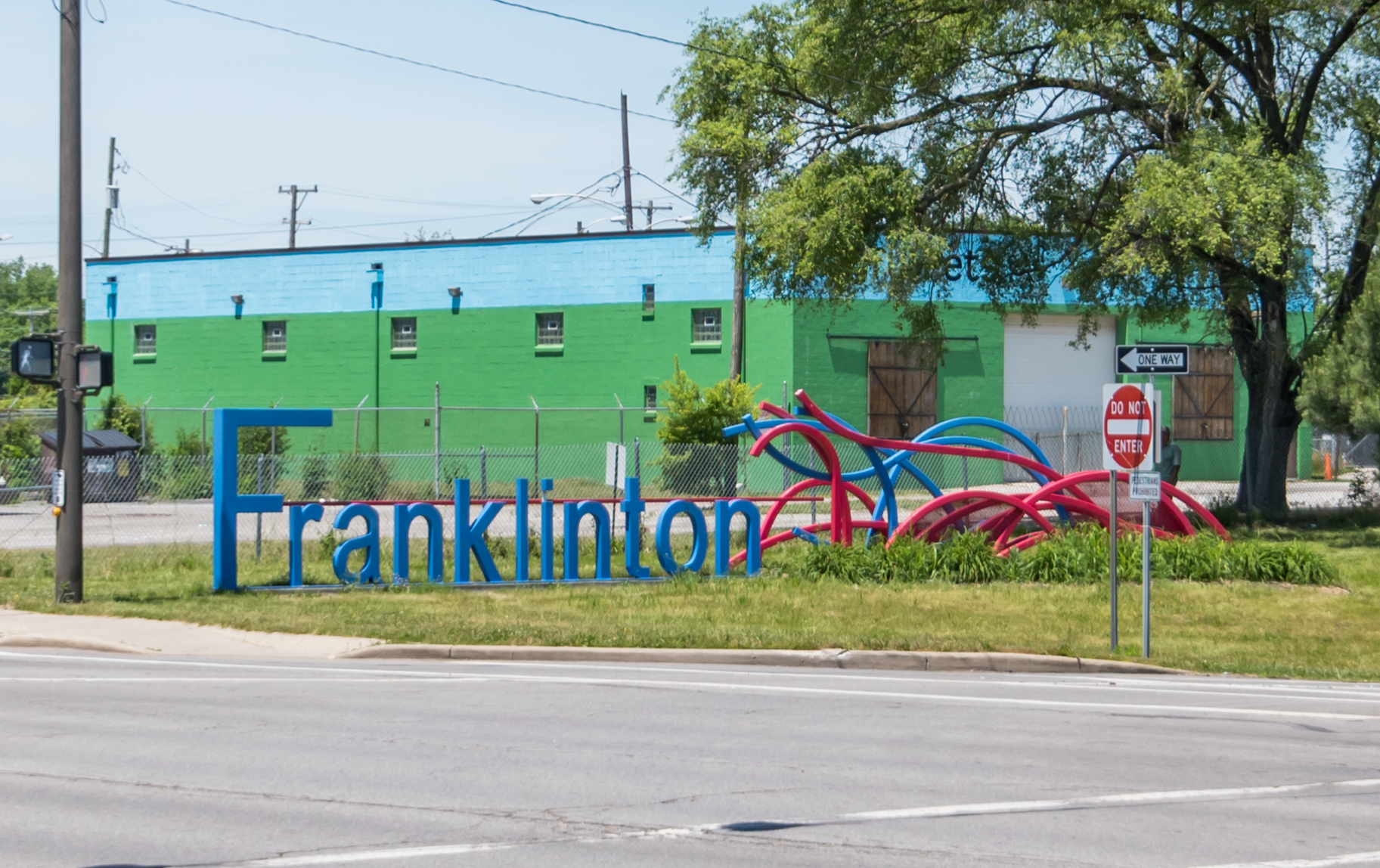
Neighborhood road sign

Franklinton is a neighborhood in Columbus, Ohio, just west of its downtown. Settled in 1797, Franklinton is the first American settlement in Franklin County, and was the county seat until 1824. As the city of Columbus grew, the city annexed and incorporated the existing settlement in 1859. Franklinton is bordered by the Scioto River on the north and east, Harmon Avenue on the east, Stimmel Road and Greenlawn Avenue on the south, and Interstate 70 on the west. Its main thoroughfare is West Broad Street, one of the city's two main roads.

A portion of the neighborhood is sometimes called The Bottoms because much of the land is subject to flooding from the Scioto and Olentangy rivers, and a floodwall is required to contain the rivers and protect the area from floods. The low-lying bottom land was well suited for farming, with the river serving as a direct connection to the Ohio River. The floodwall, completed in 2004, spurred developments in East Franklinton. The projects involved demolition of three public housing projects, displacing its former residents to other areas. The developments are predominantly luxury mixed-use buildings, spurring significant gentrification in the neighborhood.

== History ==
=== Settlement and founding (1795–1859) ===
Lucas Sullivant, founder of Franklinton

In 1795 Lucas Sullivant was employed by the Commonwealth of Virginia to survey the Central Ohio portion of the Virginia Military District. Sullivant, along with approximately 20 men surveyed the western side of the Scioto River at the confluence of the Olentangy and Scioto Rivers. As payment for his work, Sullivant was given 6,000 acres in the Refugee Tract reserved for those who aided the American Revolution.

Sullivant, after surveying the land, returned to Kentucky where he courted Sarah Starling, the daughter of his mentor Colonel William Starling. In 1797, Sullivant returned to the Ohio and laid out a village of 220 lots in Franklin County, which he named Franklinton in honor of the recently deceased Benjamin Franklin. This original settlement fronted the forks of the rivers. In 1798, a year later, a flood submerged most of the town. Sullivant then relocated the settlement to an adjacent space, simply on a higher elevation off of the riverbank.

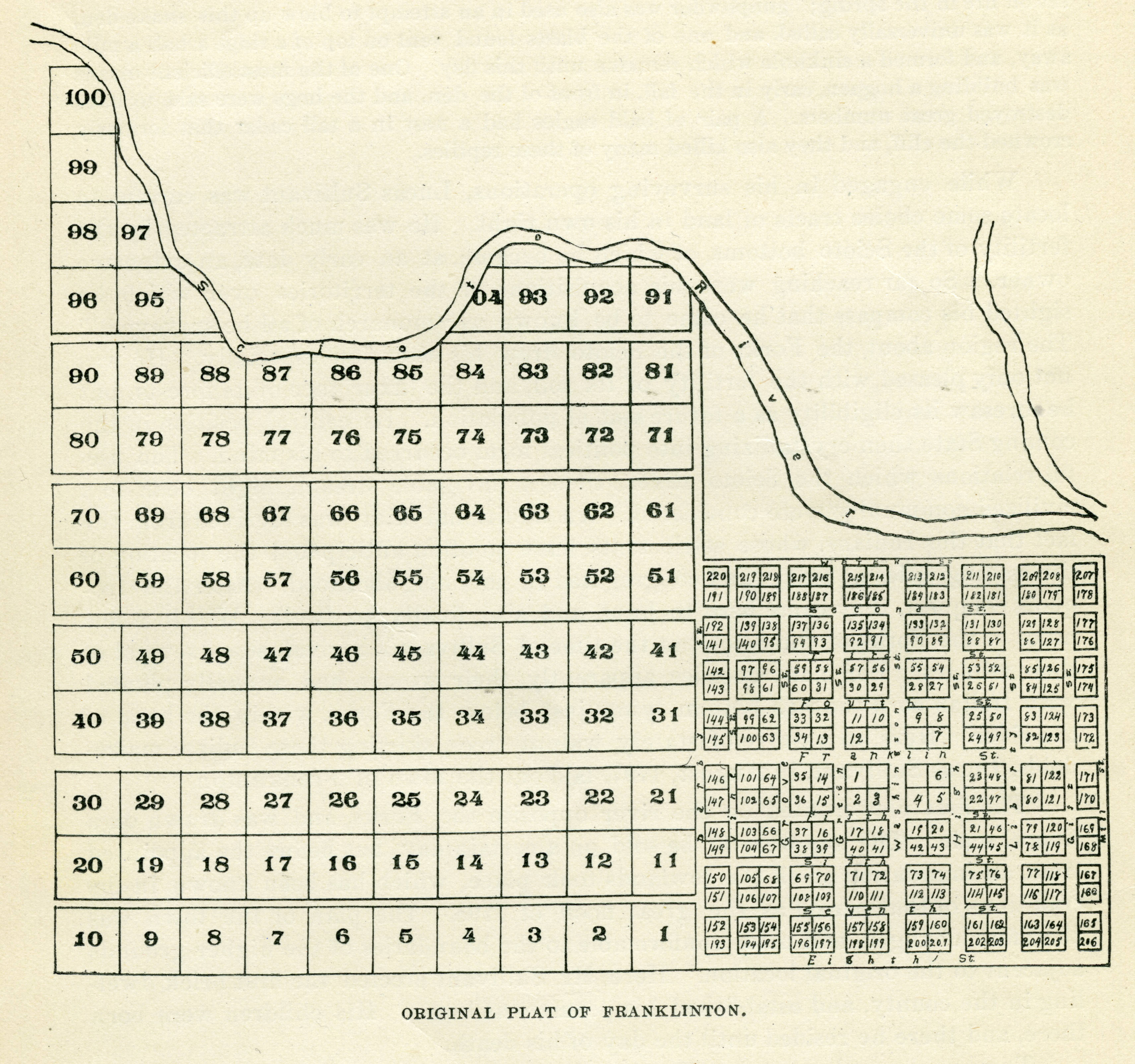
Original Franklinton plat map

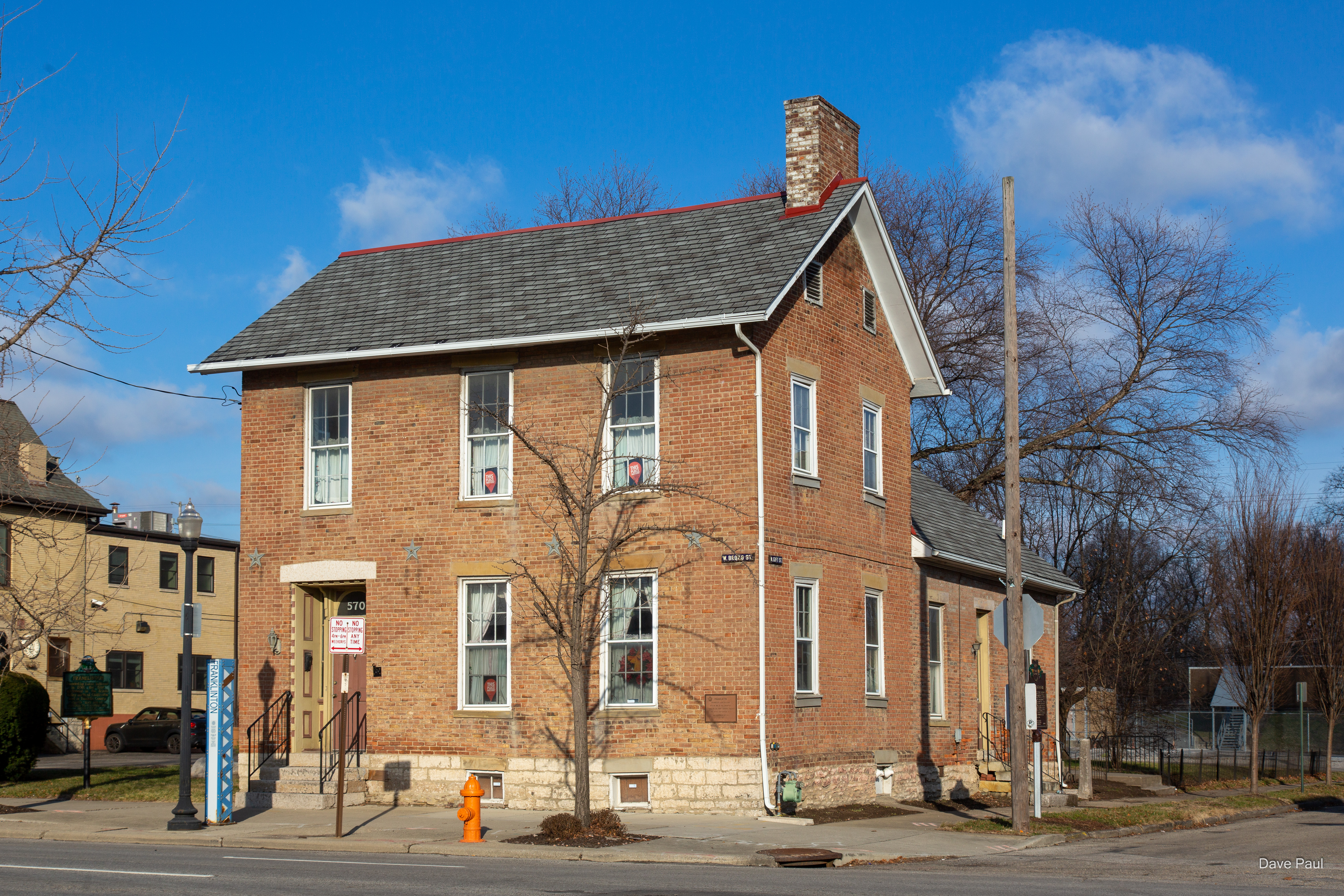
Gen. William Henry Harrison Headquarters in Franklinton

The replatted town was laid out in blocks that contained four lots in a square, with each lot measuring 99' wide by 115' deep. To encourage people to move to the new settlement, Sullivant offered free land for anyone willing to build a house along Gift Street, near the eastern edge of his plat. Along with platting and settling the town, Sullivant also built several structures out of brick and glass from Philadelphia. These buildings included a courthouse, a brick home to impress Starling (who was wed to Sullivant in 1801), a brick church and the first bridge across the Scioto River.

The town of Franklinton was then made the county seat of Franklin County in 1803, when Franklin County was created from Ross County. The population and town grew during the War of 1812, as Franklinton served as a staging point for General William Henry Harrison's Army of the Northwest. Following the war, the community continued to grow with the expansion of the country's railway system along with the construction of a new state capital, Columbus, on the opposite side of the Scioto River. Columbus's growth eventually led to it being named county seat in 1824 and Franklinton was annexed by the city in 1859.

In 1846, traveler Henry Howe had this to say about Franklinton: "Franklinton lies on the west side of the Scioto, opposite Columbus. It was the first town laid off in the Scioto valley north of Chillicothe. From the formation of the county, in 1803, it remained its seat of justice until 1824, when it was removed to Columbus. During the late war, it was a place of general rendezvous for the northwestern army, and sometimes from one to three thousand troops were stationed there. In those days, it was a place of considerable note; it is now a small village, containing, by the census of 1840, 394 inhabitants."

He visited again in 1886, writing: "Franklinton now is included in the city of Columbus. It has changed less than any part of the city so near the centre, and preserves to this day many of its old style village features. It is a quiet spot, but cannot much longer so remain in the rapid progress of improvements."

=== Post-annexation (1860–1899) ===
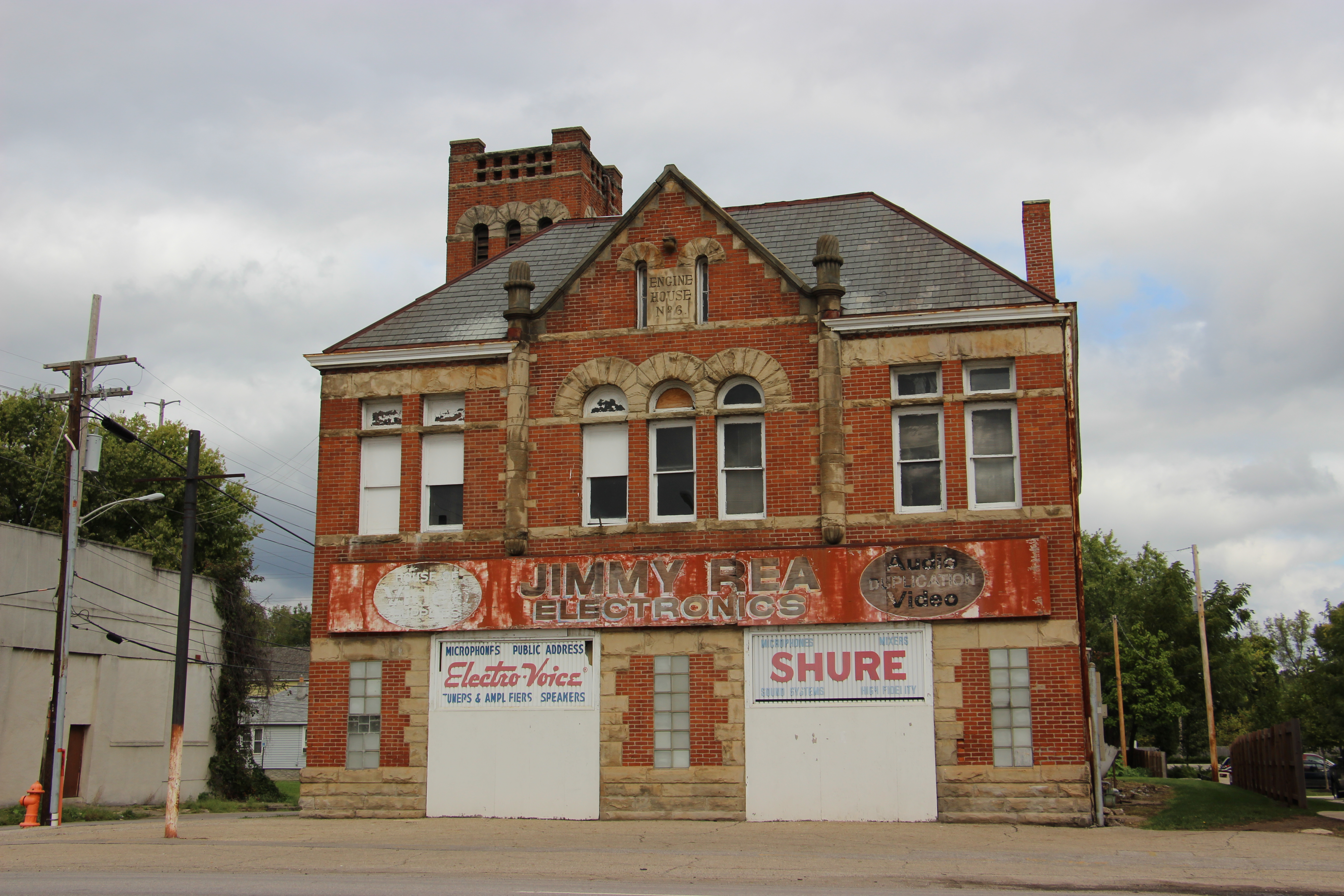
Engine House No. 6, a city fire station from 1892 to 1966

During the last half of the nineteenth century, four railroads were established in Franklinton and brought commercial and industrial growth. In 1850, the Columbus and Xenia Railroad Company was chartered to build and operate a railroad that ran from Columbus, Ohio to Xenia, Ohio. This railroad was the first to run through Columbus and into central Franklinton. The growth of local railroads and governmental action in the United States, including Abraham Lincoln's Pacific Railroad Acts, caused railroads to become a major form of transportation in the twentieth century. By 1902, the popularity of the railroads forced Ohio canals into retirement. The need for interurban travel created Columbus interurban railways.

Franklinton quickly transformed from a farming based community to an urban society known for its railroad cars and horse-drawn buggies. The railroad service and industrial development drew people from the southwest part of the state and West Virginia. Many of these people chose to reside in the East Franklinton area to be closer to the industrial activity. Although Franklinton continued to grow as an industrial center, the frequent flooding near most of the industrial development proved to be problematic. Franklinton experienced multiple minor floods, which ravaged the west side in 1798, 1832, 1834, 1847, 1852, 1859, 1860, 1862, 1866 (the river rose 12 feet that year), 1868, 1869, 1870, 1875, 1881, and 1883.

In 1889, the city spent $50,000 to construct massive levees along the banks of the Scioto. The majority of the current houses in Franklinton were built after the completion of these levees.

On September 14, 1897, Columbus held a three-day сentennial celebration for Franklinton. Local and notable guests were invited to speak at the celebration. Though the speeches praised Lucas Sullivant's courage and hard work, many agreed that, in retrospect, the flood-prone area had been unfit for settlement. Also, the original neighborhood design had not included alleys.

=== 20th century ===
Franklinton experienced extreme flooding in the Great Flood of 1913. After two days of steady rain, the wooden levees holding the Scioto River collapsed on March 25, 1913. The flood engulfed the neighborhood of Franklinton with 7–17 feet of water. Police officers in horse-drawn carriages traveled the flooded streets, warning residents to head to the higher ground of the adjacent Hilltop neighborhood. While recording the devastation of the flooding, Robert F. Wolfe, publisher of The Columbus Evening Dispatch, chartered an interurban train from Columbus to Buckeye Lake and took nine motorboats and 20 rowboats with him to the river's edge. From Rich & Scioto Street he was able to help residents who could not get to higher ground. The rising of the waters swept 93 people to their deaths and left 20,000 people homeless. It also destroyed nearly 500 buildings and every bridge in the downtown area. A large number of residents relocated to the Hilltop. As a result, property values dropped as much as 50 percent. Early estimates of the flood damage to homes and businesses came in at $5 million with the eventual total climbing to $22 million. The damages from the Great Flood of 1913 led to some the first watershed planning and flood-control measures.

In 1943, B & T Metals in East Franklinton was involved in producing uranium reactor fuel for the Manhattan Project. Between March and August of that year, the company was contracted to extrude about 50 tons of uranium for the Hanford reactor, in the early stages of the U.S. nuclear weapons program during World War II. Workers were given no protection from radiation, though were given physicals every week. The site was remediated in 2001, and most of the building was demolished in 2011. The northwest corner of the building remains standing, at 435 W. Town St., where most of the contamination was centered.

A rescue boat during the 1913 flood

The 1959 Flood was the last major flood to hit the Franklinton area. On January 22, 1959, the Frank Road crest on the Scioto River came and was 27.22 ft. above the flood stage level. The frozen ground throughout the area was partly responsible for the large volume and rapid rate of runoff of the heavy rain.

From 1977 to 1985, the gay club Rudely Elegant operated on West Broad Street in Franklinton, in the art-deco Avondale Theatre. The club was notable for its street presence, at a time when Midwest gay clubs would be unmarked and accessed from alleyways. The club was open to straight people as well, and became known for its themed costume parties; some called it the Studio 54 of the Midwest. It was operated by Corbett Reynolds, a leading figure in the city's LGBT community, and now stands as a Lev's pawn shop. The club and its owner were featured in a Columbus Museum of Art exhibition in 2019–20.

In 1983, The Federal Emergency Management Agency determined almost all of Franklinton to be in a floodplain and at risk from a flood with a 1% chance of annual occurrence. As a community that participates in the National Flood Insurance Program, the City Council adopted an ordinance that restricted new construction in the area. All construction in the area was to meet the minimum criteria of the National Flood Insurance Program. These restrictions caused Franklinton to have a gradual population decline.

During the latter half of the twentieth century, the construction of the Interstate Highway System had a major effect on Franklinton. The inner belt construction of the 1960s removed several buildings along Sandusky Street, resulting in lowered property values and driving families out of East Franklinton. In addition to the land use and population changes that occurred, the inner belt formed a barrier which sealed off the side of East Franklinton that was not bordered by the Scioto River. This isolation was reinforced with the construction of West Interstate 70.

=== 21st century ===
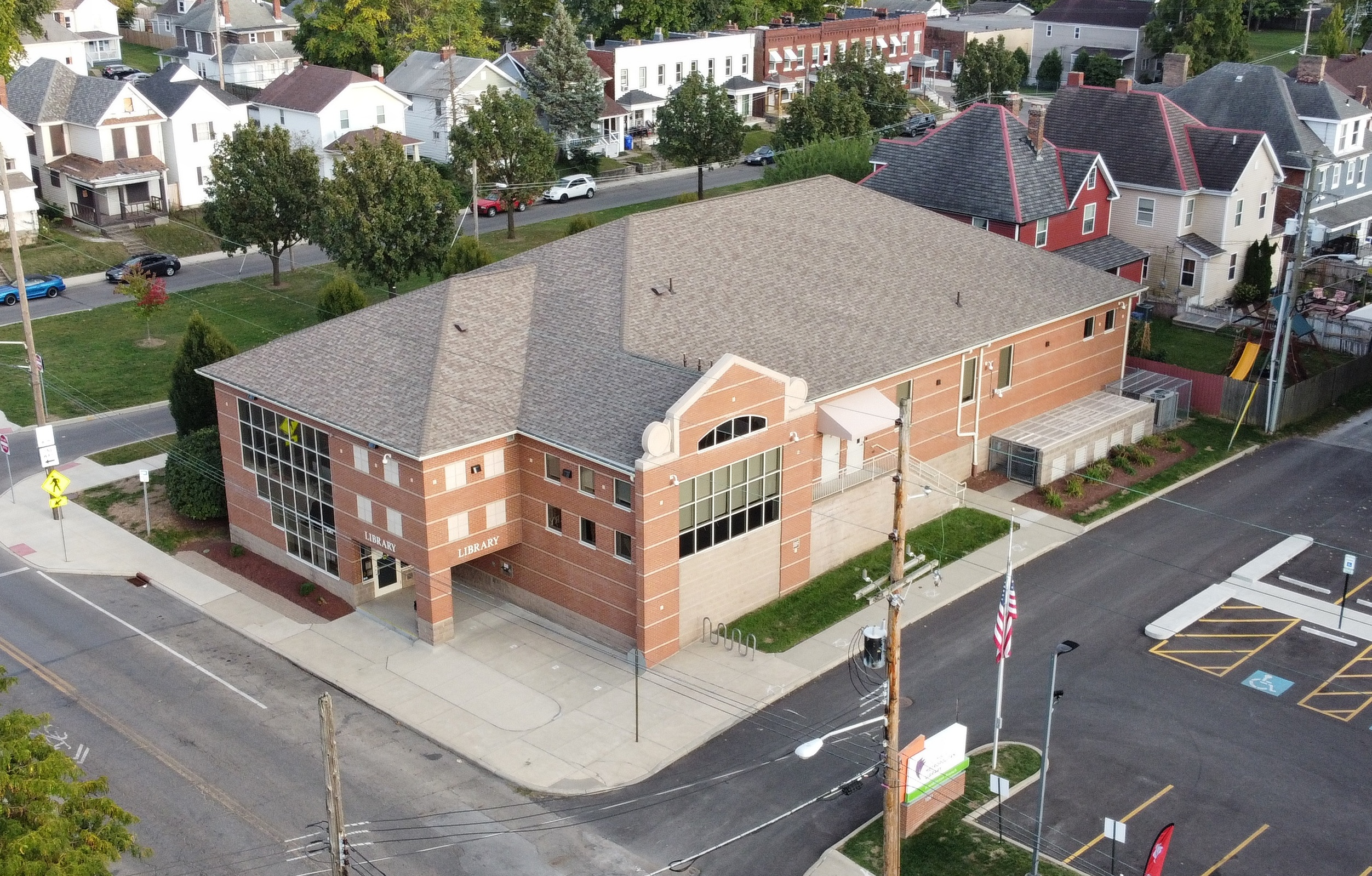
Franklinton branch of the Columbus Metropolitan Library

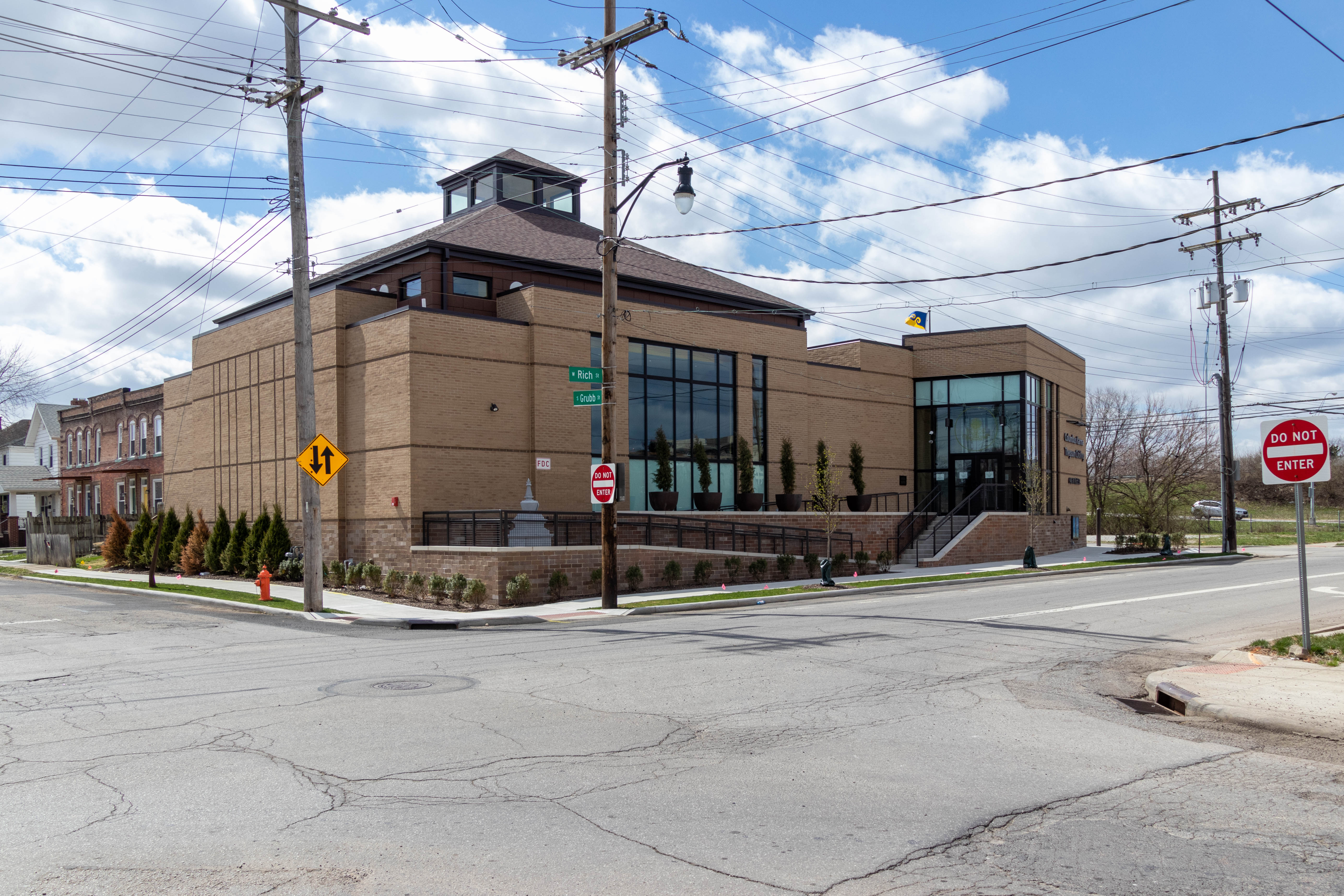
Columbus Karma Thegsum Chöling, a Buddhist temple reconstructed in 2022

Today, Franklinton is an urban neighborhood consisting of about 36,000 residents. Though recent redevelopment efforts have improved the area, 56% of Franklinton residents lack a high school diploma, over 60% of residents live below the poverty line, and 93% of students at the school's public elementary school are eligible for free or reduced lunch.

The Franklinton Floodwall, completed in 2004, is 7 miles long, cost $134 million, and is able to protect the area to crests of up to 30.9 ft. The wall's completion released the area from being considered a floodplain, as well as releasing the previous building restrictions that often prevented development in the past. As a result, commercial and industrial activities are starting to grow in the East Franklinton Area. This resurgence is evidenced through multiple community plans, as well as the creation of the Franklinton Area Commission.

Between 2009 and 2011, the Columbus Metropolitan Housing Authority demolished three housing projects in the East Franklinton area. Two high rises, Sunshine Annex and Sunshine Terrace, and a 127 unit apartment complex, Riverside Bradley. The population in East Franklinton was greatly reduced as a result.

During this time, the city of Columbus rehabbed 16 homes through a program called Home Again.

Also during this time, Franklinton benefited from the Housing and Economic Recovery Act of 2008 (signed into law by George W. Bush) and its follow up, the American Recovery and Reinvestment Act of 2009 (signed into law by Barack Obama). The funds from these acts passed through the Neighborhood Stabilization Program, and led to the building, rehabilitation, or demolition of over 100 houses in Franklinton, through organizations like Habitat for Humanity and the Franklinton Development Association.

The City of Columbus is focusing on creating a new Short North style neighborhood in Franklinton through developing an urban creative district. This new neighborhood is now centered between Gift, Town, Lucas, and Rich Streets, with hope to expand to East Franklinton. The developers have purchased existing buildings and are working to refurbish some existing buildings to retain the character of the neighborhood.

== Geography ==
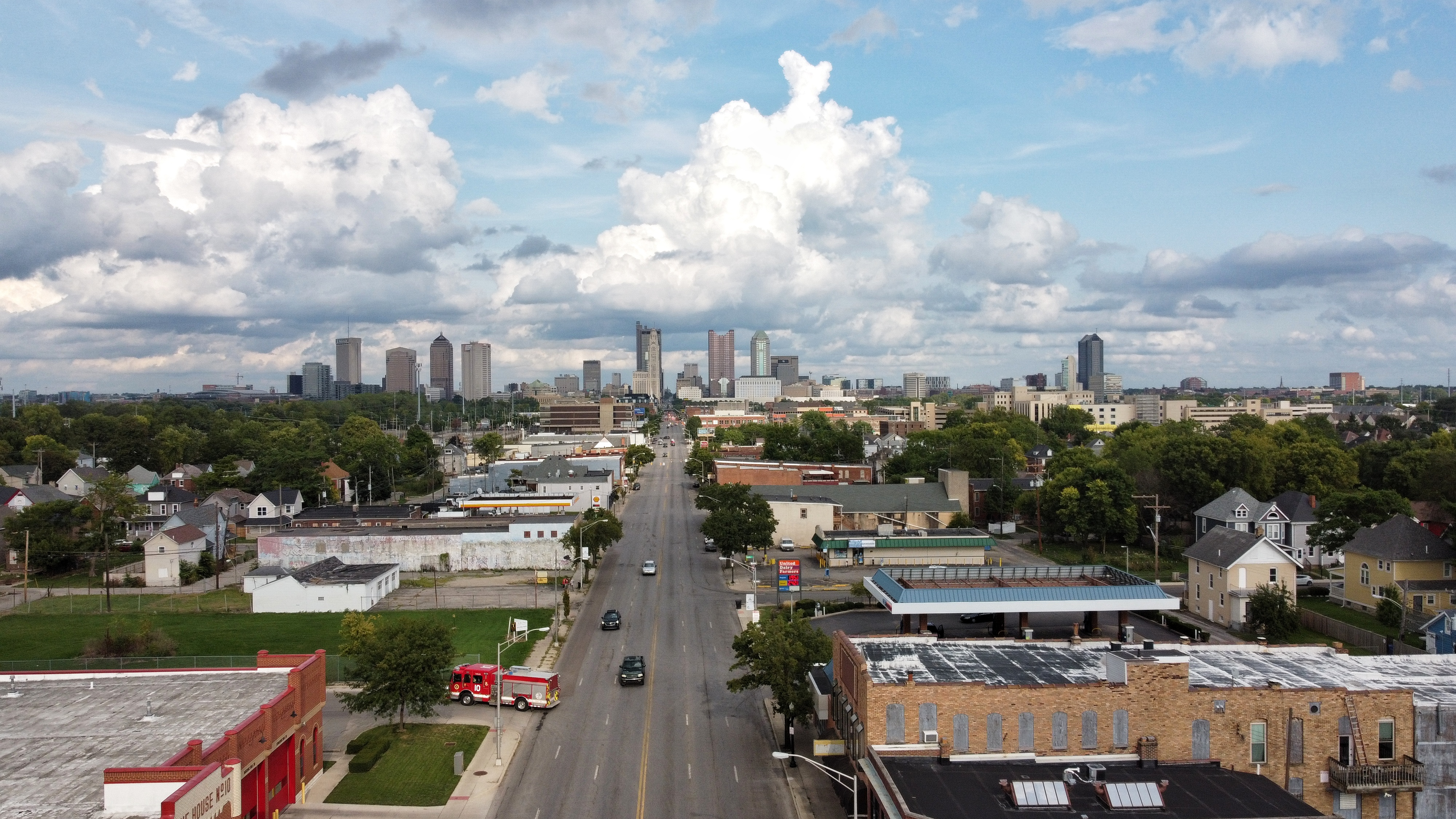
West Broad Street in the neighborhood's center

Franklinton is a neighborhood bordered by the Scioto River on the north and east, Harmon Avenue on the east, Stimmel Road and Greenlawn Avenue on the south, and Interstate 70 on the west. West Broad Street, also known as U.S. Route 40 or the National Road, is Franklinton's main thoroughfare. It is the neighborhood immediately west of Downtown Columbus, Ohio. A floodwall is required to contain the rivers and protect the area from devastating floods. Just west of Franklinton is a large group of smaller neighborhoods commonly referred to as "The Hilltop".

=== Scioto Peninsula ===
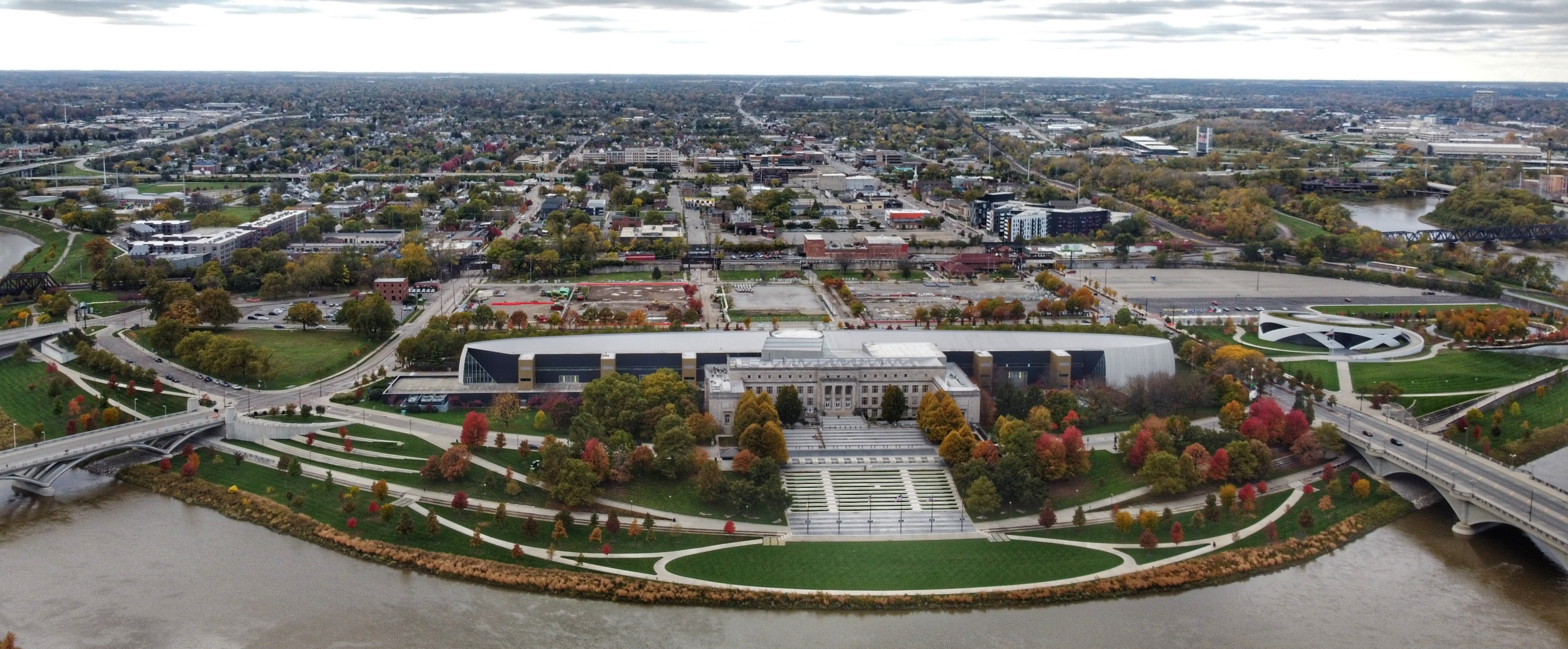
The Scioto Peninsula, in the foreground

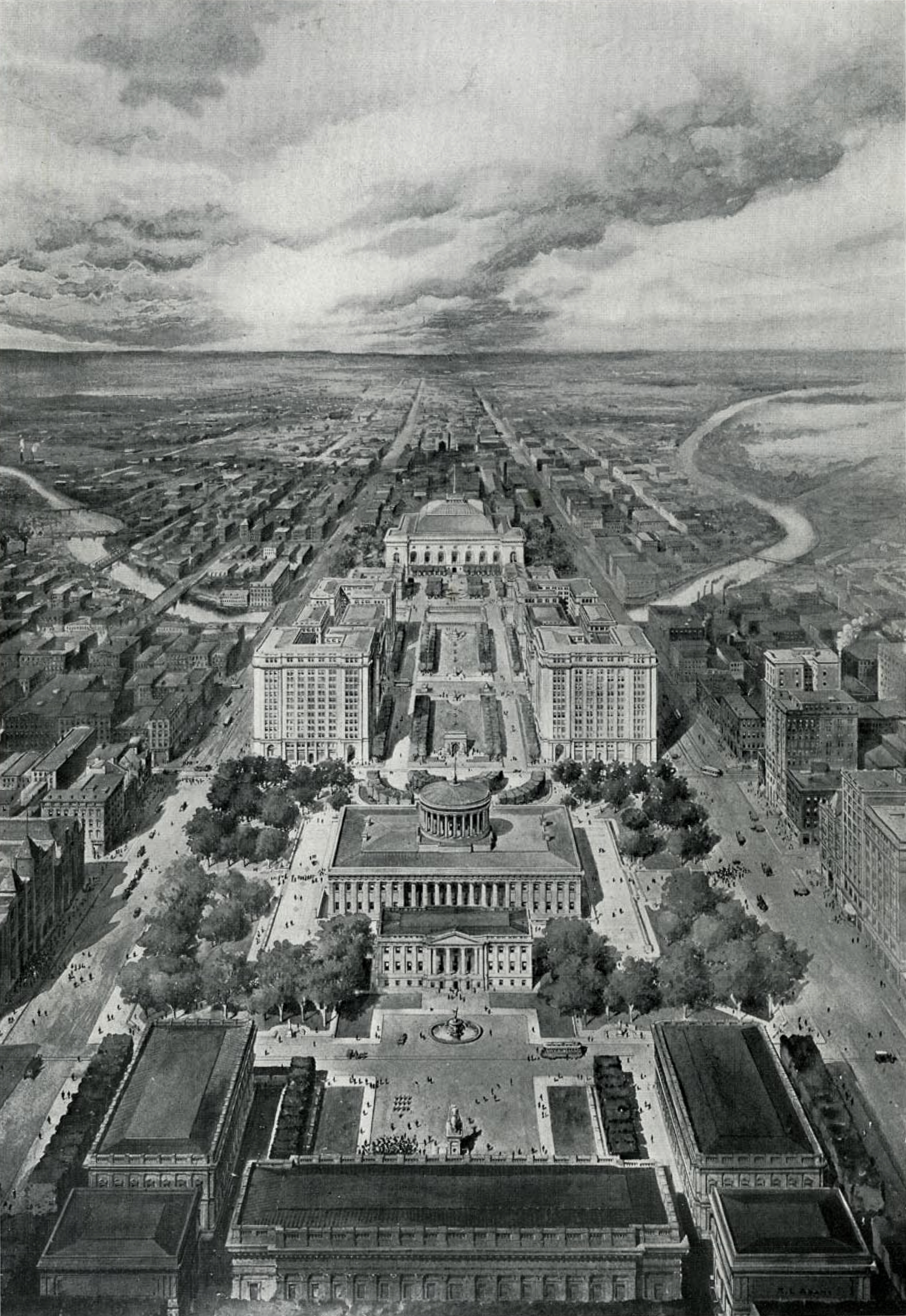
The 1908 Columbus Plan envisioned a new civic center branching across the Scioto River

The Scioto Peninsula is a geographic peninsula on the west bank of the Scioto River. The land was part of the early Franklinton settlement, and it is still largely considered part of the neighborhood, though some definitions place it in Downtown Columbus. The city government first designated the land as part of downtown in 1998, due to park improvements and COSI's establishment there at the time. The 2003 Franklinton Plan acknowledged that neighborhood residents perceive the space as distant and separated from their neighborhood, and recommended plant- and tree-lined corridors to visually link the areas.

The peninsula is defined by the Scioto River to the east, northeast, and southeast, and the easternmost set of Norfolk Southern railway tracks to the northwest, west, and southwest. The land, once primarily industrial, houses the National Veterans Memorial and Museum, the COSI science museum, the Toledo and Ohio Central Railroad Station, a police station, the Lower Scioto Greenway, and the parks Genoa Park, Dorrian Green, and the Memorial Grove. All other spaces are used for parking or are vacant lots awaiting redevelopment.

Redevelopment planning dates as early as 1908 with the Columbus Plan, which envisioned a set of large buildings and lush grounds from downtown into Franklinton, similar to the National Mall in D.C. The planned development only partially took place, and only on the peninsula with the creation of Central High School in 1924. The first modern planning for the site began in 1986 with the Riverfront Strategic Plan, followed by the Scioto Peninsula Plan in 1989. Redevelopments in 1997 displaced homeless residents of the area, and forced the closure of a shelter and relocation of another. The nonprofit Community Shelter Board established the Scioto Peninsula Relocation Task Force to find stable housing and support services for these displaced residents.

The Scioto Peninsula project (also branded as The Peninsula) was first planned in 2012. It subsequently went through multiple design and developer changes. The first phase, which was approved in May 2020 and broke ground that September, includes four buildings: an office building, hotel, and two apartment buildings, all estimated to open in summer 2022. It is estimated the site may eventually hold 20 buildings, including 1,800 residences, 400 hotel rooms, 2 million square feet of offices, and 200,000 square feet of restaurant and retail space. The 20-acre site is part of the downtown community reinvestment area, and so will receive a 15-year, 100 percent tax abatement once completed.

Land use changes

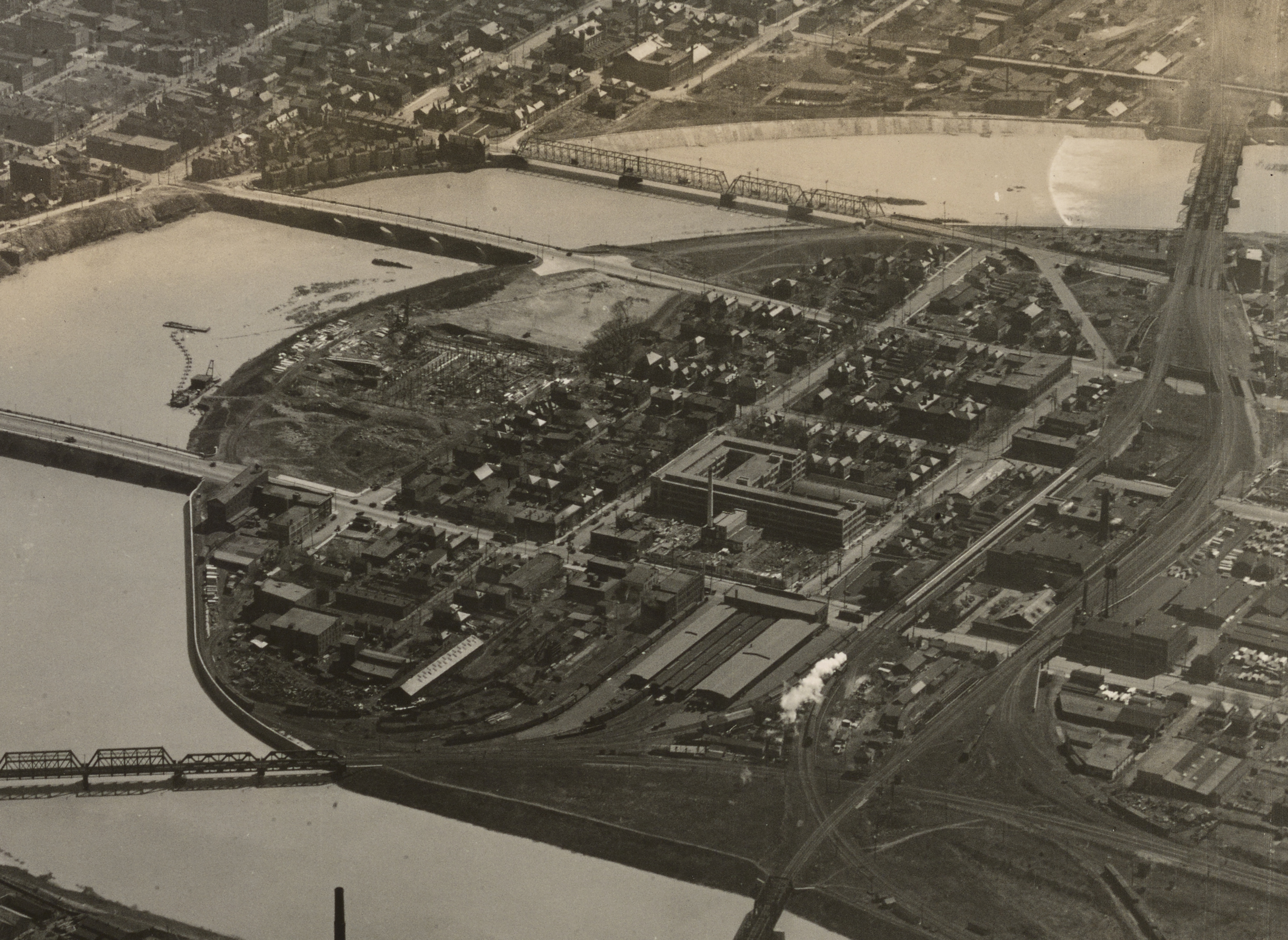
The peninsula c. 1923

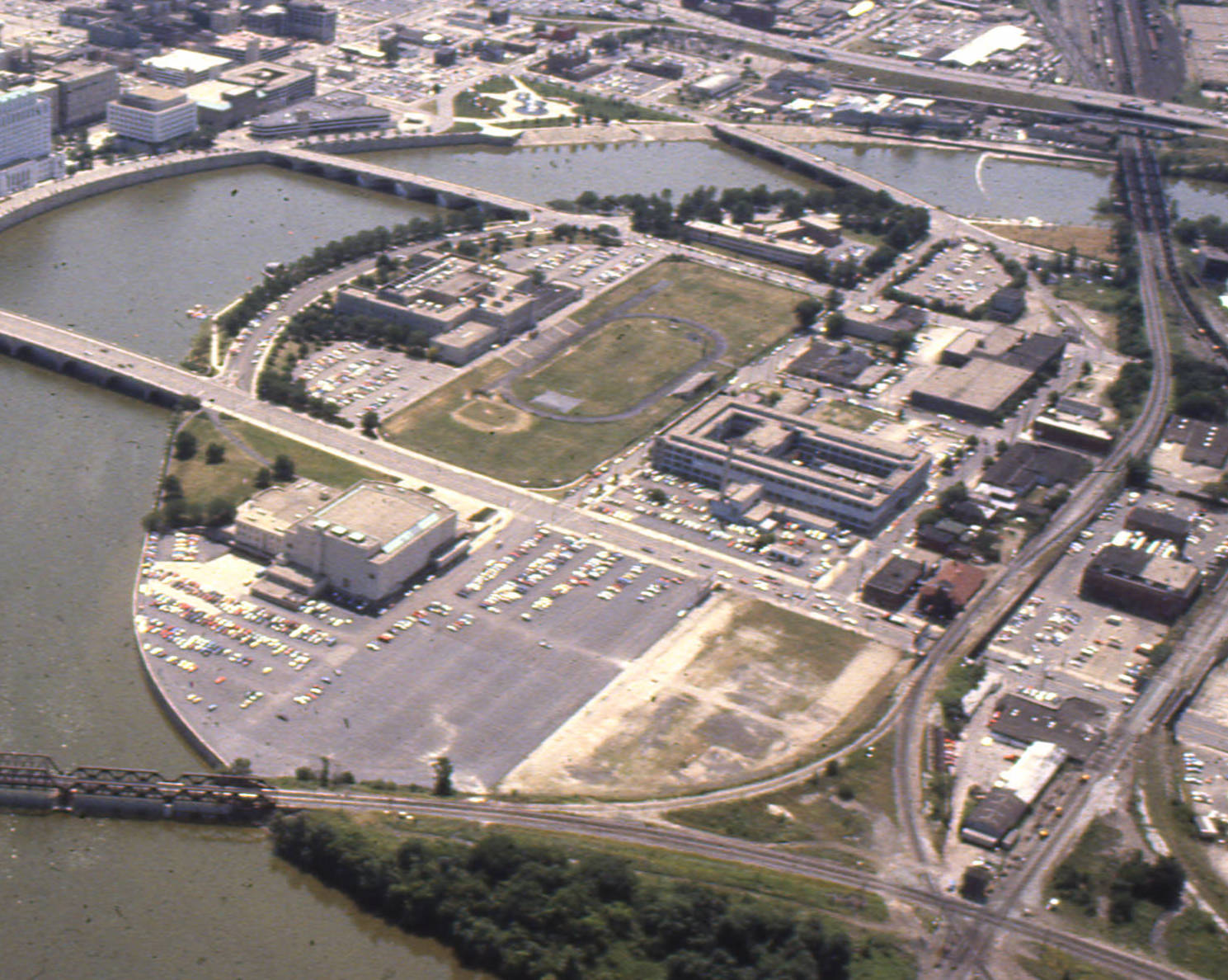
The peninsula in 1981

== Demographics ==
The neighborhood has seen a wide population change over its history. Its population peaked in the 1950 census, with 26,500 people. Since that year, it has seen a consistent decline to an estimated 8,132 in 2017.

== Land use ==
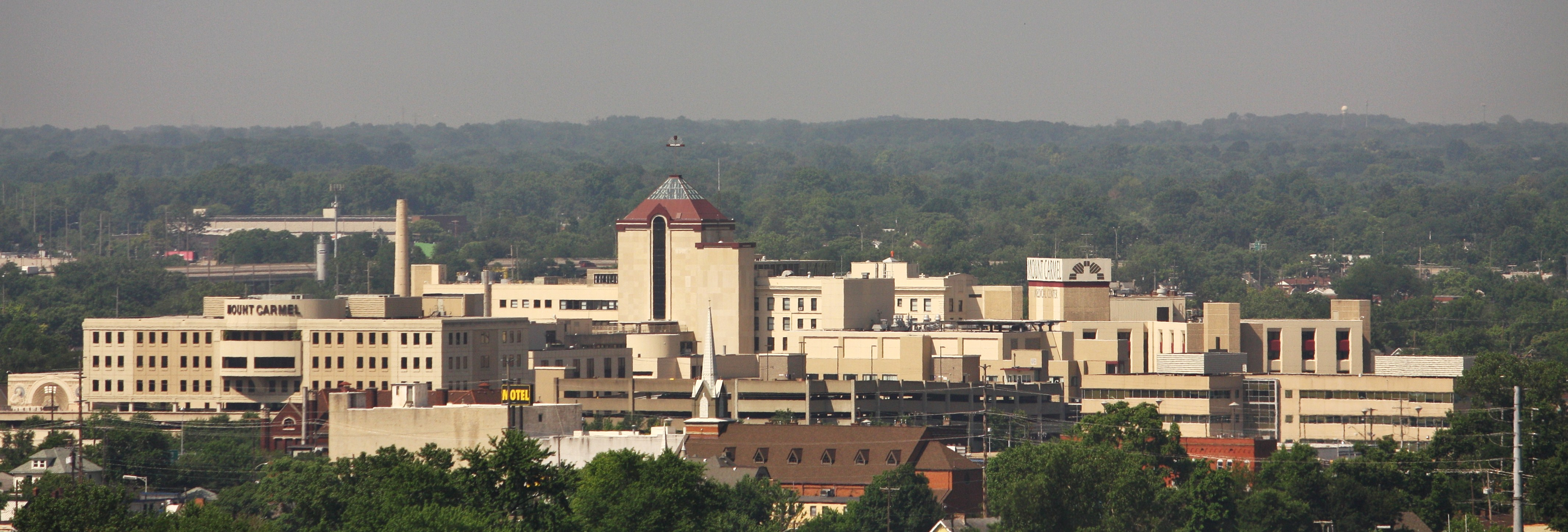
Mount Carmel West, demolished in 2019-20

Franklinton is characterized by a mix of land uses, reflecting its pattern of development as an independent, self-sufficient community. Some sub-districts can contain a mix of residential, commercial, office, research, institutional or certain light industrial uses, even within the same building. Arts-related uses are emphasized while existing single-family homes are protected.

Three sub-districts have been established in which land uses are organized: Broad Street, Arts and Innovation, and Dodge Park. These are consistent with the way the East Franklinton Plan was organized. The Broad Street and Arts and Innovation sub-districts strongly support mixed uses and the Dodge Park sub-district (north of Dodge Park) emphasizes residential. Single and multi-family residential use plots are located throughout the area. Most commercial uses are concentrated along West Broad Street. These include both neighborhood-oriented and regional commercial uses, including large office complexes and a retail center. In addition, there are many manufacturing land uses in Franklinton, with the heaviest concentrations along McKinley and Harmon avenues. Franklinton also contains several institutional and public land uses. The Center of Science and Industry (COSI) and the National Veterans Memorial and Museum are among the major land users within this category.

The City of Columbus has designated Franklinton as a Community Reinvestment Area that is "ready for opportunity", with available 15-year, 100 percent tax abatements for all projects, with no affordable housing requirements.

== Housing ==
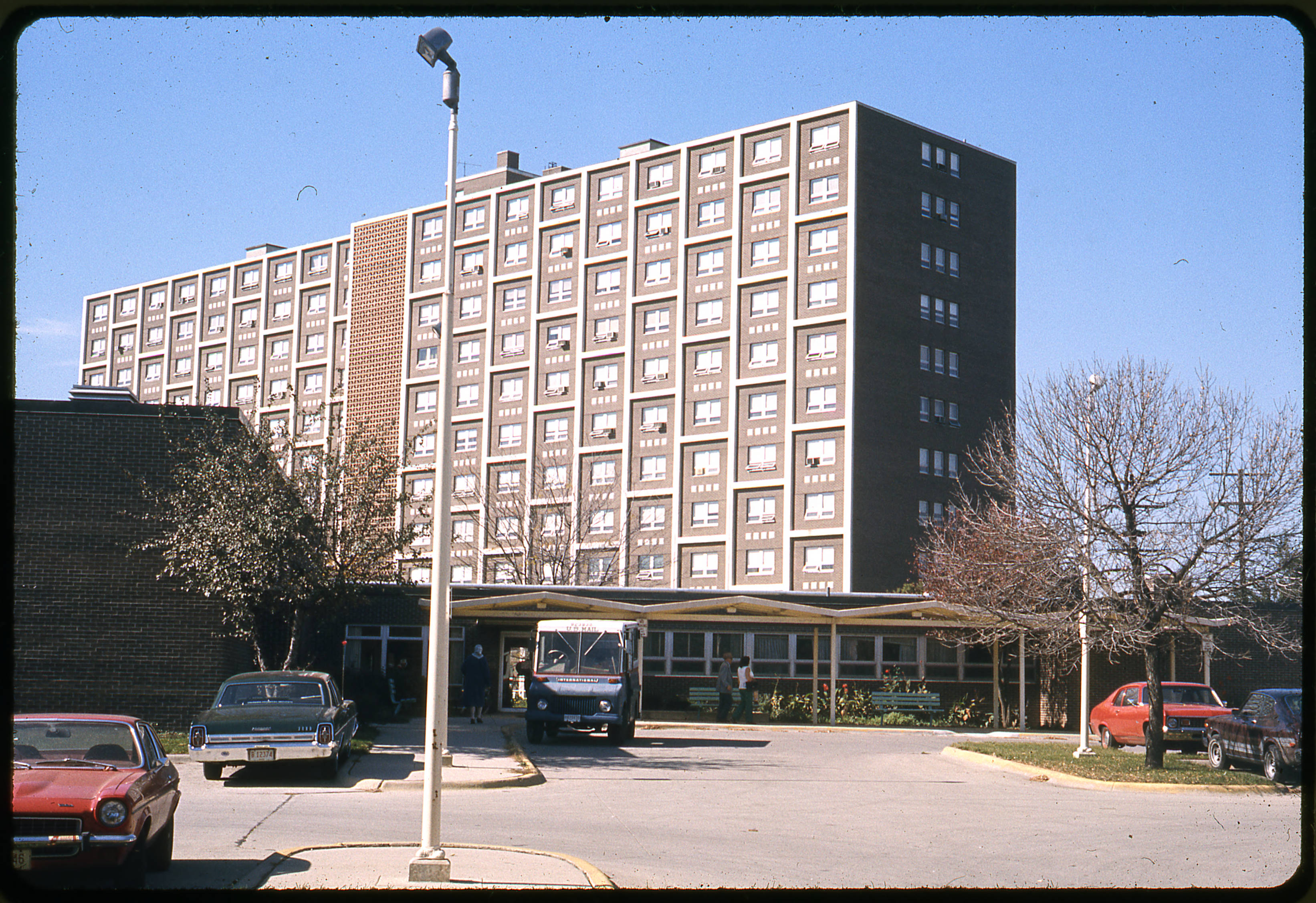
Sunshine Terrace, a low income housing project demolished in 2014, set to be replaced by the second phase of the River & Rich development

As of the 2000 United States census, there are 5,444 housing units in Franklinton. About 1,000 of these units, roughly 18.4%, are unoccupied. Only 29.2% of housing units in Franklinton are occupied by their owners. The proportion of rental homes in Franklinton is higher than the average rates in most Columbus neighborhoods.

The Columbus Metropolitan Housing Authority (CMHA) historically operated numerous public housing projects in the neighborhood. The CMHA is an organization which aims to help people who have difficulty in affording housing, as well as build healthy living environments for the community. The CMHA formed at 1934, and begin its construction of public housing in 1937. The first project was the Poindexter Village, named for James Preston Poindexter, which accommodated about 400 families. The CMHA housing projects in Franklinton were replaced by upscale mixed-use developments in the 2010s, though it was marketed as having never been residential previously.

The neighborhood has included numerous homeless shelters in its history, including the Volunteers of America men's shelter (moved from the Scioto Peninsula to South Franklinton in 2003) and the Open Shelter (closed in 2004; replaced by Faith Mission downtown).

== Structures and landmarks ==
=== Parks ===
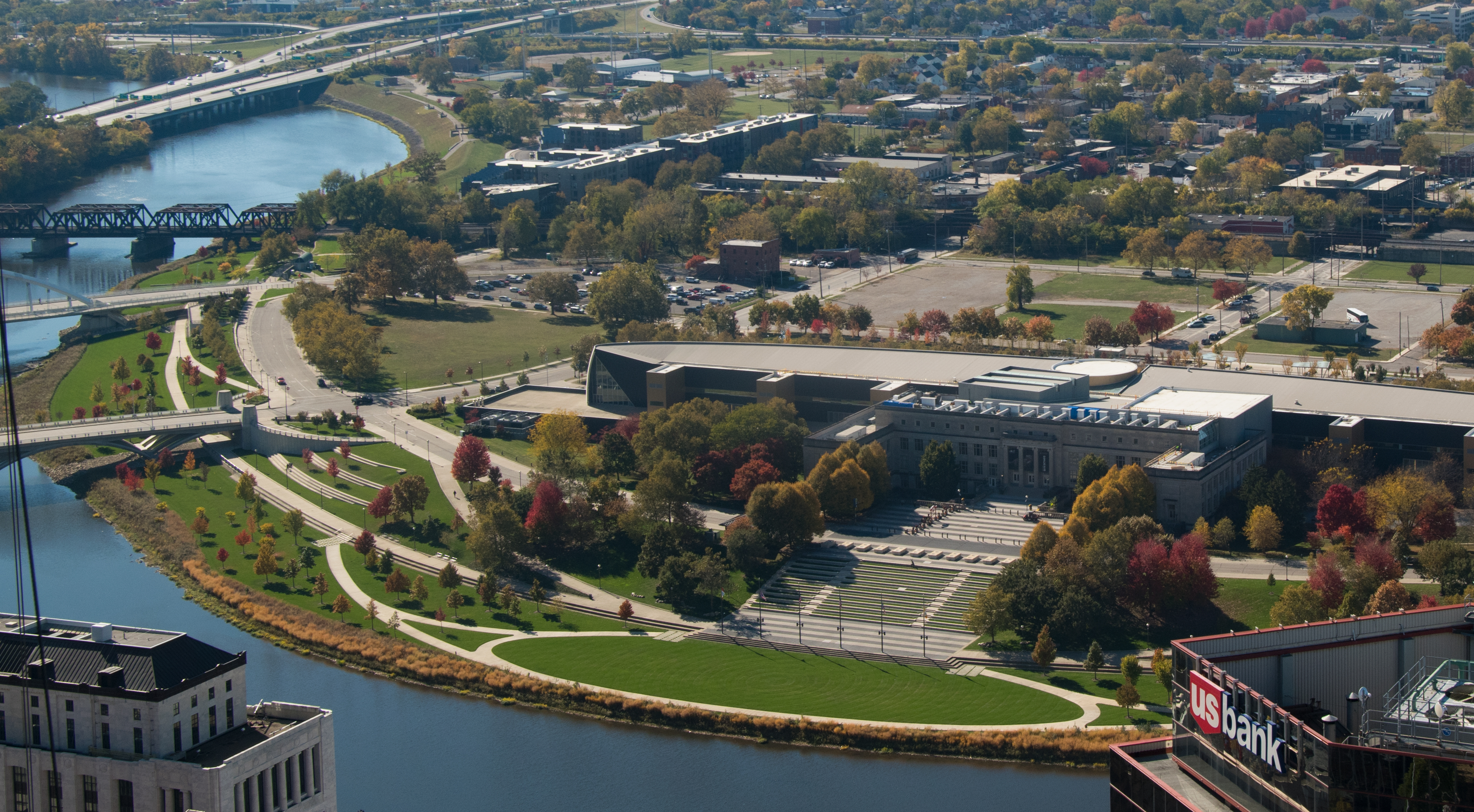
Genoa Park is at the edge of the neighborhood, between the Scioto River and COSI.

The Franklinton neighborhood contains several parks, including Dodge Park, Genoa Park, Dorrian Green, McKinley Park, and Cody Park. Genoa Park, previously named the Riverfront Amphitheater, can be found on the west bank of the Scioto River. It has an area of 2.07 acres and access to a greenway walking trail for residents to enjoy. Genoa Park hosts events such as Rhythm on the River, Waterfire, and the Latino Festival. McKinley Park is a neighborhood park located at McKinley Ave. in northwest Franklinton. The neighborhood consists of 6.95 acres, which includes athletic fields, basketball courts, picnicking facilities, and playgrounds. The area serves as a public space for the residents. Cody Park, located on Brehl Avenue, covers 0.29 acres of land and has a playground.

=== Landmarks ===
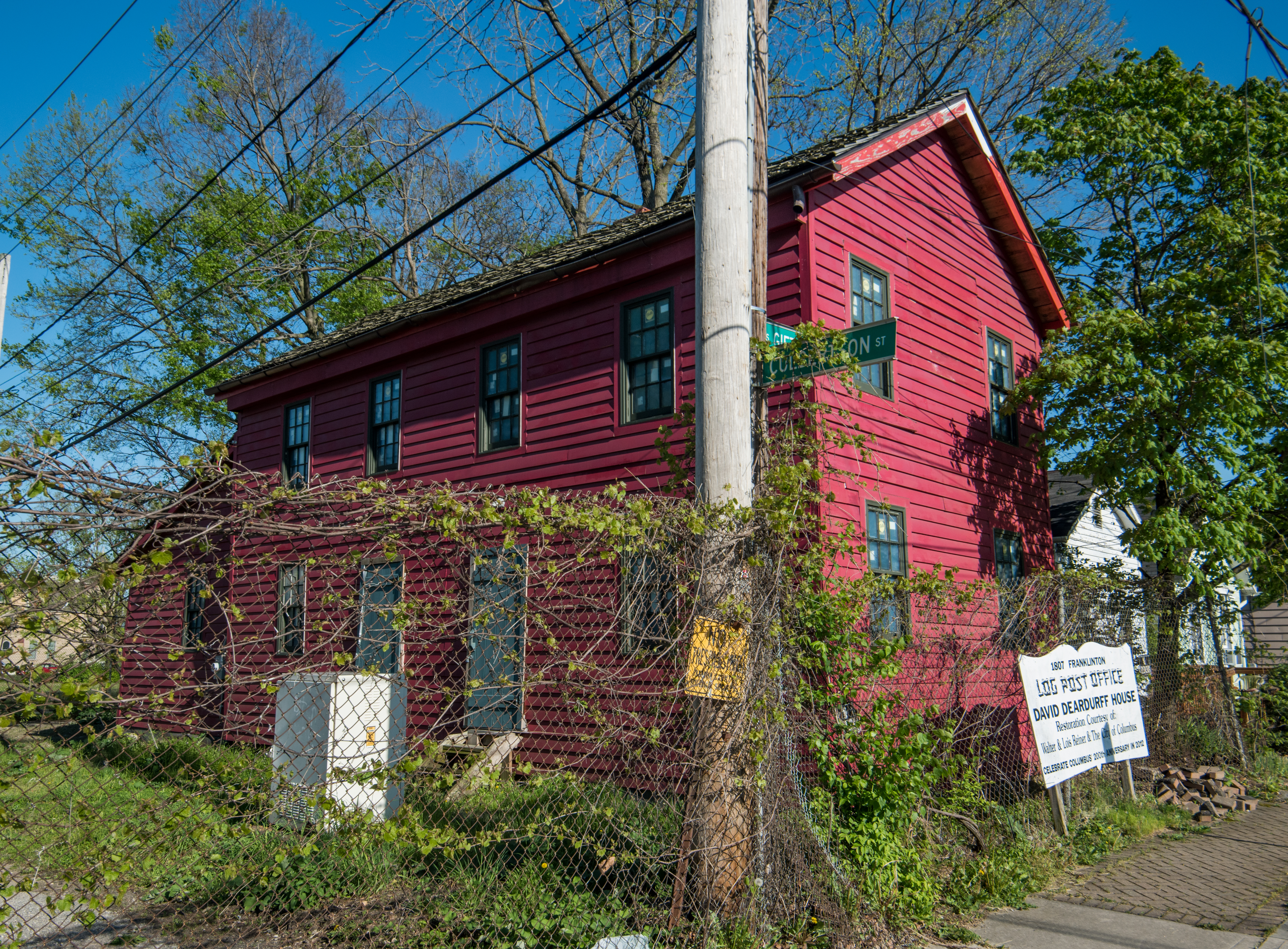
Former Franklinton Post Office, built 1807, the oldest building in Columbus still on its original foundations

The Dodge Recreation Center, Sullivant Gardens Community Center, McDowell Senior Center are three recreational centers located in the Franklinton neighborhood. The Dodge Recreation Center and Sullivant Avenue provides various facilities such as athletic fields and swimming pools for the community. Franklinton contains several centers for restaurants and social spaces. In terms of social spaces, Franklinton is positioning itself to become a new creative district of Columbus.

Landmarks on the national and Columbus registers of historic places include:

- Central High School
- Engine House No. 6
- Former West High School
- Franklinton Apartments at Broad and Hawkes
- Franklinton Apartments at State and May
- Franklinton Post Office
- Gen. William Henry Harrison Headquarters
- Lucas Sullivant Building
- Lubal Manufacturing & Distributing Company
- Toledo and Ohio Central Railroad Station

=== Green Lawn Abbey ===
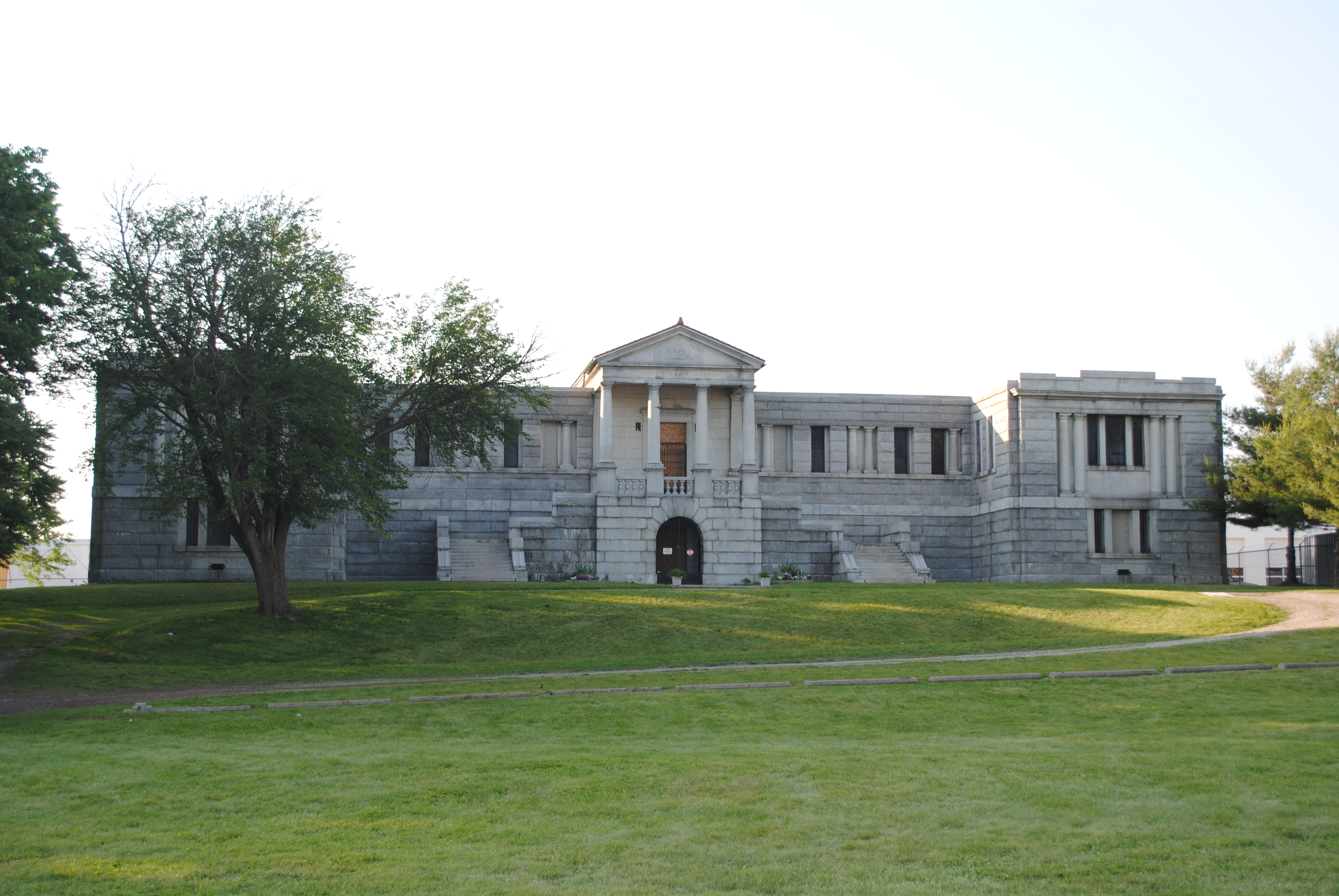
Green Lawn Abbey, a mausoleum built in 1927

In 1927, the Green Lawn Abbey was built by the Columbus Mausoleum Company. The private community mausoleum was designed with a gray granite exterior and columned second-floor portico. In the nineteenth century, cities were closing burying grounds within city limits. Private community mausoleum began to appear in the 1920s. Green Lawn Abbey was the largest with 654 crypts, one-and-a-half-thick walls, marble floors, a central chapel and foyer area and stained-glass windows.

=== Holy Family Catholic Church ===
The Gothic-style Holy Family Catholic Church was built following the land purchase of April 1, 1881, with the cornerstone being laid by Bishop of Columbus John Ambrose Watterson on September 17, 1882. It was completed on June 2, 1889, and dedicated by Watterson. The church can seat one thousand. During the Flood of 1913, upper floors were used to provide flood relief.

=== Floodwall ===
The Franklinton Floodwall began construction in 1993 and was completed in 2004 at an expenditure of 193 million dollars. The wall protects the area from flooding by the Scioto River. A flood in 1959 was one of the worst disasters in Franklinton's history.

== Education ==
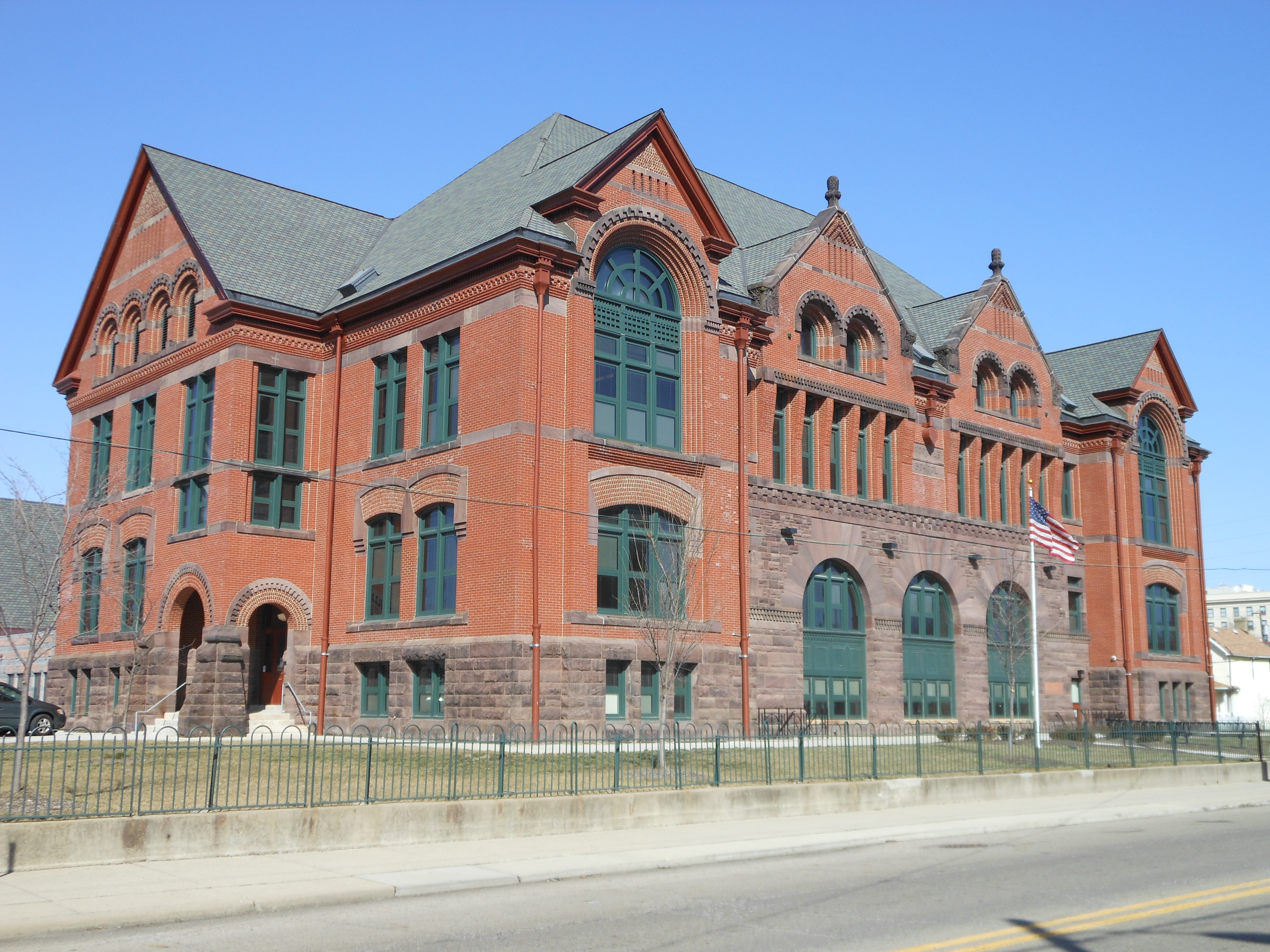
Avondale Elementary School

Franklinton is served by Columbus City Schools. West High School, in the nearby Hilltop neighborhood, serves as the high school for all of Franklinton. Starling K-8 serves all students in grades 6–8. Elementary school education is divided between three schools: Starling K-8 on the west side, Sullivant Elementary on the east side, and Avondale Elementary in between. One former elementary, the Bellows Avenue Elementary School, was deemed eligible for the National Register of Historic Places in 2006. The building is planned to be demolished by the state; meanwhile its owner is restoring the building to operable condition.

Private schools in the neighborhood include Columbus Collegiate Academy and Franklinton Prep Academy. Specialized schools include the West Central School, operated by Franklin County for children with developmental disabilities.

Additionally, the Mount Carmel College of Nursing is located in the neighborhood, founded by the Sisters of the Holy Cross in 1903. The college provides bachelor's, master's, and doctoral degrees, along with other programs.

== Infrastructure ==
=== Transportation ===
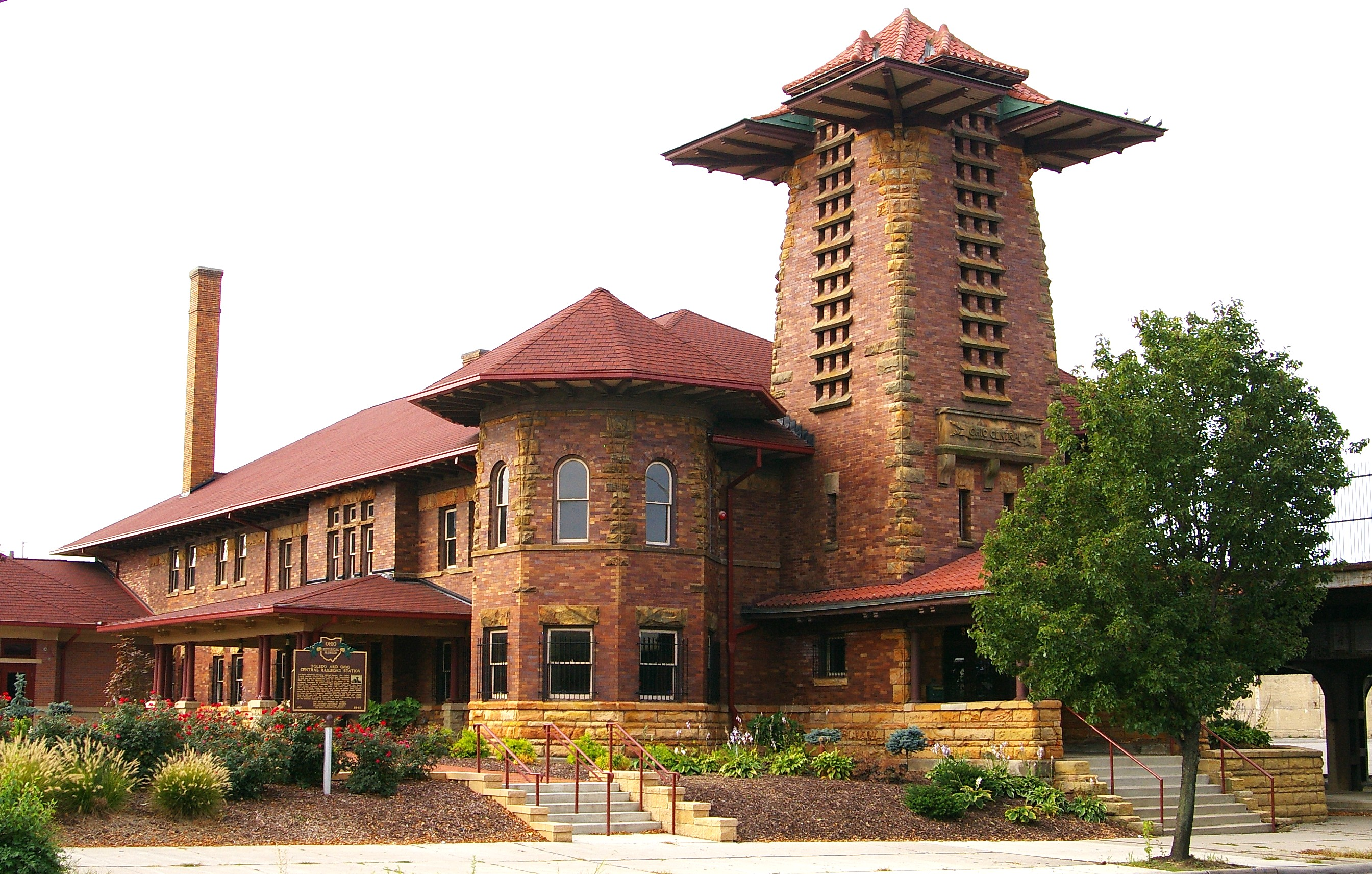
The Toledo and Ohio Station is the only remaining train station building in Columbus, now used by a firefighters' union

Franklinton has a traditional street grid for mixed traffic. The Central Ohio Transit Authority has routes well-situated throughout the neighborhood, including routes 3, 6, 9, 10, 12. As of 2017, about 40% of the populace has no access to automobiles, about the same as the percent with access.

==== Streets ====
Broad Street is the primary thoroughfare in Franklinton; other east–west avenues include McKinley, Town, Sullivant, and Mound.

Broad Street is one of the major east–west main thoroughfares in Franklinton. It is situated between McKinley Avenue and Town Street. Broad Street intersects Central Avenue, Glenwood Avenue, and High Street in addition to running above both SR 315 and I-71 making it one of the most significant roads in Columbus. In the Columbus Thoroughfare Plan, it was classified as a type "6-2" arterial, meaning six moving lanes, flowing two ways. As the name implies, Broad Street is a wide street with about a 60-foot width, and carries around 16,000 vehicles a day.

Sullivant Avenue is another major east–west main stem in Franklinton. Unlike Broad Street, it is a "4-2D" type arterial, in other words it is "four moving lanes, two way and a median divider on mainline sections". Sullivant Avenue goes past I-70, Central Avenue, Glenwood Avenue, and ends at Gift Street to the east. It lies between Town and Mound Streets.

=== Health and healthcare ===
Healthcare is limited in Franklinton. After the closure of Mount Carmel West in the neighborhood in 2019, the neighborhood was left with no hospitals. A new emergency department was completed for the Mount Carmel Health System in Franklinton around 2020. Only about 3 percent of the hospital's patients were from the neighborhood, while over 50 percent were from Grove City, where the hospital moved to. Emergency department visits are high in Franklinton; the 43223 zip code in South Franklinton was the sixth-highest in a list of Franklin County emergency department visits by area.

Franklinton has the lowest life expectancy rating in the state of Ohio. In 2021, the Health Policy Institute of Ohio reported that residents here have an average life expectancy of 60 years, 29 years shorter than the highest (Stow, Ohio, averaging 89.2 years). Infant mortality is high, with 15.2 infant deaths per 1,000 live births, versus 8.4 for Franklin County. Birth weight is also low, with 15.4% born under 5.5 lbs., versus 9.1 in Franklin County.

Health insurance coverage varies in Franklinton. 13.2 percent lack health insurance, compared to 9 percent county-wide. Public healthcare plans cover nearly half of area residents, compared to 31 percent of county residents.

=== Emergency services ===
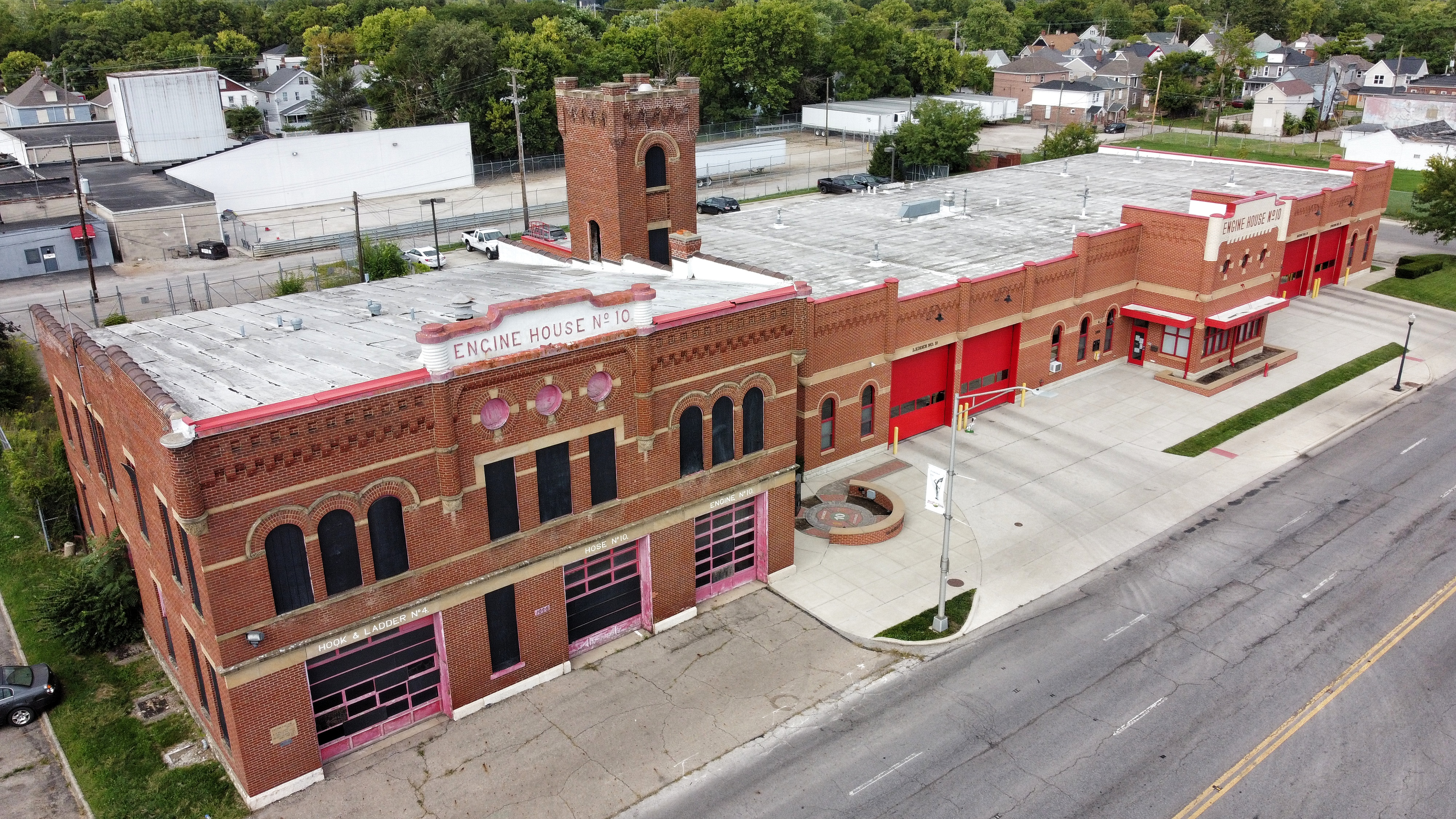
Station 10 (right) beside the historic Engine House No. 10 (left)

The neighborhood is served by a fire station, Station 10. It is Franklinton's only fire station. In the 19th century, before motorized fire engines entered use, fire stations could not cover as wide of an area, requiring the neighborhood to maintain Engine House No. 6 and Engine House No. 10.

=== Food access ===
Franklinton lacks a commercial grocery store, despite community attempts for years, and is considered a food desert. Food insecurity is high for every area in the neighborhood: its three zip codes make up three of five with very low food security in Columbus. In 2018, a small nonprofit grocery and cafe opened to alleviate some of the food insecurity, the first nonprofit grocery in the city. It is now reportedly closed.

In 2007, Franklinton Farms (formerly known as Franklinton Gardens) was founded. A farming, gardening, and education non-profit, the scattered-site urban farm's programs include a free U-Pick Garden and a Community Supported Agriculture (CSA) program The organization offers options to those SNAP/EBT benefits and donates approximately 30% of their produce directly to farm visitors and indirectly through other local food access organizations.

== In the media ==
Franklinton was depicted in the pilot of 30 Days, a Morgan Spurlock production. The show depicts living for 30 days in a different lifestyle to your own. In the episode, aired in 2005, Spurlock and his fiancé unsuccessfully attempt to live in Franklinton and work in the city on minimum wage.

== See also ==
- Lucas Sullivant House
- Old Franklinton Cemetery
