= Lucas Sullivant =

Founder of Franklinton, Ohio (1765–1823)

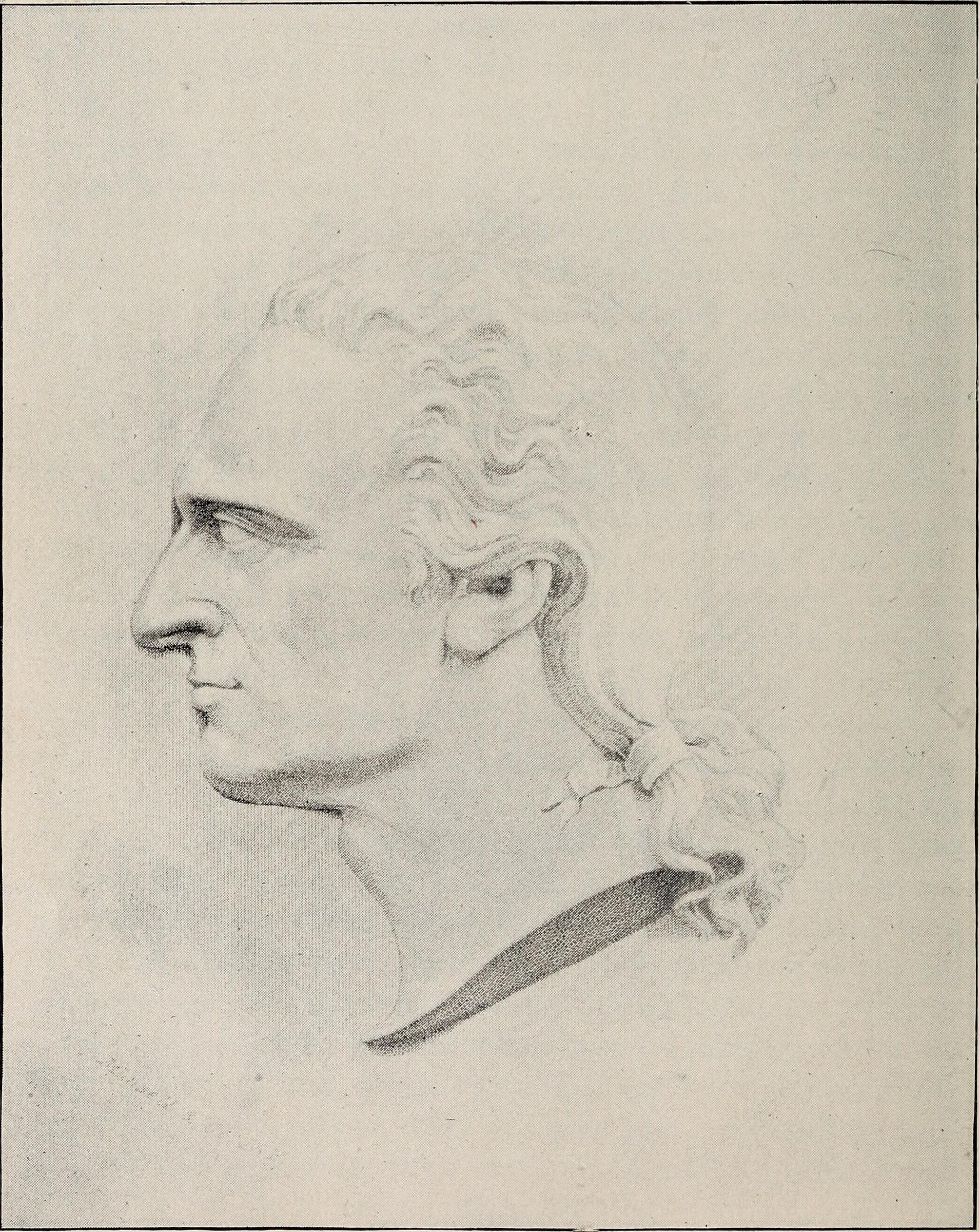
- Born: September 22, 1765; Mecklenburg County, Virginia
- Died: August 8, 1823 (aged 57); Franklinton, Ohio, US
- Resting place: Green Lawn Cemetery, Columbus, Ohio
- Occupations: Surveyor, land developer
- Known for: Founding Franklinton, Ohio; first Clerk of Courts of Franklin County; first Recorder of Franklin County
- Spouse: Sarah Starling (m. 1801; d. 1814)
- Children: 4, including William Starling Sullivant

Lucas Sullivant (September 22, 1765 – August 8, 1823) was an American surveyor, soldier, and settler born in Mecklenburg County, Virginia, who founded Franklinton, Ohio, the first permanent settlement in what became Franklin County and the predecessor to the city of Columbus.

== Ancestry and early life ==
Sullivant was of Irish descent on his father's side, the family name deriving from the ancient Gaelic surname Ó Súilleabháin of southwestern Ireland. The Sullivan family emigrated from Ireland to the British colony of Virginia in the early 1700s, and Lucas's grandfather is credited with adding the "t" to the end of the family name, establishing the Sullivant line in North America. His father, Michael Sullivant, married a Miss Hannah Lucas in Lunenburg County, Virginia. His mother's ancestry was English.

Michael Sullivant died when Lucas was still a boy, and after paying off his father's many creditors, the family was left with just enough land to farm tobacco. Lucas's brother drowned in the Roanoke River while transporting a tobacco crop to market, and his mother died in 1781. When his sister Anne married a cousin, Lucas was left on his own. At the age of 18, he traveled west to Kentucky, where he met and befriended Colonel William Starling, who assisted him professionally and socially and introduced Lucas to his daughter, Sarah. During this time, Lucas apprenticed himself to become a surveyor. At about sixteen, he had volunteered to join an expedition against Indians threatening the western counties of Virginia, earning public commendation from his commanding officer for his courage and conduct.

== Surveying career and the Virginia Military District ==
In 1795, following the Treaty of Greenville, which ended Ohio's Indian Wars and established the boundary between Native American territory and lands open to white settlers, Sullivant worked as a surveyor of the Virginia Military District between the Scioto and Little Miami Rivers. The officers and soldiers of the Continental army had appointed Colonel Richard C. Anderson, a distinguished officer of the Revolution, as surveyor-general of the Virginia Military Land District. Sullivant received from him an appointment as deputy surveyor.

In some of his first attempts, Sullivant was driven back by the Indians, but finally, having formed and equipped a larger surveying party at Limestone, now Maysville, Kentucky, he turned his back upon civilization and struck out through the wilderness, arriving in due time on the Scioto. His party consisted of about twenty men, including surveyors, chain-carriers, markers, huntsmen, scouts, and pack-horse men.

While running his lines, Sullivant encountered a Frenchman on horseback accompanied by two Indians on foot. After exchanging salutations and passing on, he heard gunshots and found that his rear guard had fired upon them, killing the Frenchman. Sullivant reprimanded his men severely for the unprovoked attack, knowing it would invite retaliation from the Indian villages on the Scioto. His fears were confirmed. Four days later, he caught sight of a band of Indians larger than his own party crossing the prairie. After cautioning his men to stay quiet, a flock of wild turkeys flew into nearby trees and the men disobeyed orders and fired. The warriors rushed at them with a volley. Two of Sullivant's men were killed before the party escaped into the darkness.

On one expedition, Sullivant awoke to find a large rattlesnake coiled on his blanketed chest. On another, recorded in the Ohio History Journal from the family's account, Sullivant arrived alone at the forks of the Scioto to find a canoe his men had left for him, embarked late in the evening, and shortly after pushing out discovered three Indians lurking in a grove of sycamores on the west bank of the Whetstone. He pushed on up the river and soon found that the Indians were cautiously following, with no further doubt as to their intention.

On a later expedition, Sullivant located a tract of land for himself at the fertile lowlands opposite the forks of the Scioto, which he acquired as payment from the Virginia Military District. Like many surveyors of the time, he took his pay in land, which eventually made him one of Ohio's largest landholders, with nearly 40,000 acres.

== Founding of Franklinton ==
Sullivant found the area's fertile soil and abundant waterways suited for settlement. In August 1797, he laid out his town of Franklinton, named after Benjamin Franklin, whom he admired. He laid out a small village of 220 lots in what was then Ross County; Franklin County did not come into existence until March 30, 1803, when it was carved out of Ross County.

In 1798, the first plat, located at the junction of the two rivers, flooded, and Sullivant relocated the village to higher ground to the west. He named one street Gift Street, offering free lots to those who would settle and build. The other streets were named for the earliest settlers, including Foos, Green, Sandusky, and Skidmore. The replatted town was laid out in blocks of four lots in a square, each lot measuring 99 feet wide by 115 feet deep.

Though devoting himself principally to the care of his own estate, Sullivant was liberal and public-spirited. He supervised construction of the courthouse, built the county jail, assisted in building the first schoolhouse, and built at his own expense the first brick church for the first Presbyterian congregation, presenting it as a free gift. Franklinton became an important community in the northern part of the Virginia Military District and served as the county seat of Franklin County between 1803 and 1824.

== Marriage and family ==
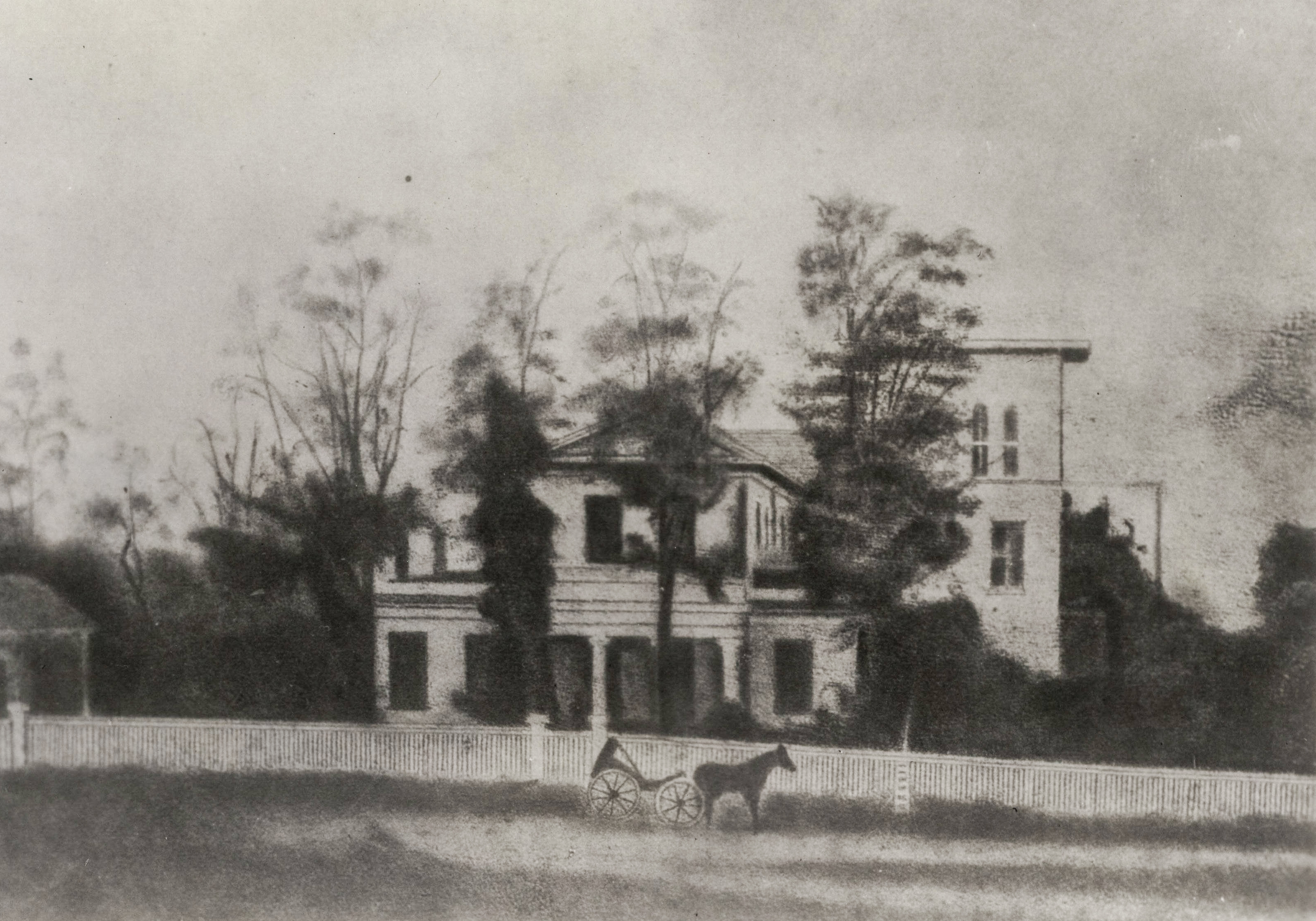
Lucas Sullivant house

In 1801, Sullivant returned to Kentucky to wed Sarah Starling and brought her to Franklinton to a two-story T-shaped brick home with twenty rooms, winding staircases, shiny walnut floors, and numerous large fireplaces. The back veranda had a view of the Scioto Valley landscape. Bricks, window panes, and a walnut staircase had been transported from Philadelphia for the construction. Lucas and Sarah had four children: William Starling, born January 15, 1803; Michael, born August 6, 1807; Joseph, born December 3, 1809; and Sarah Ann. Sarah also raised an African American child named Arthur Boke after his mother disappeared; his father had been a surveying associate of Lucas Sullivant.

== Public office ==
When Franklin County was organized in 1803, Sullivant accepted two of its earliest appointed offices. Appointed as the first Franklin County Clerk of Courts, Sullivant was charged with the responsibilities of correspondence, issuing writs, filing, docketing, and other processes ordered by the court. In January 1804, he was appointed the first Recorder of Franklin County, continuing in that role until 1807, when Adam Hosack was appointed to succeed him. Lyne Starling, Sullivant's brother-in-law, came to Franklinton in 1805 or 1806 to assist him in his duties as county clerk and county recorder.

== The War of 1812 ==
Following news of General Hull's surrender at Detroit in 1812, Franklinton became an armed mobilization point. A conference with three generals convened there with the arrival of Ohio and Pennsylvania troops and Kentucky dragoons, with up to three thousand troops collected and military inspections held in the Public Square. In 1813, Sullivant hosted a meeting on his property between U.S. General William Henry Harrison and representatives of the Shawnee, Delaware, Seneca, and Wyandot tribes. Chief Tarhe the Crane of the Wyandot tribe rose to shake hands with General Harrison, and an agreement was reached that the Native peoples would support the American cause against the British.

In the spring of 1814, typhus broke out in the army camp. Sarah Sullivant tended to the sick continuously until she fell ill herself. She died, aged 33, on April 28, 1814. Their daughter, Sarah Anne, less than two years of age, died a month later of the same illness and was buried next to her mother in the Old Franklinton Cemetery on River Street.

== The founding of Columbus ==
While Franklinton served as a wartime staging ground, the question of Ohio's permanent capital was being settled on the opposite bank of the Scioto. A syndicate of landowners on the east bank, guided and financially backed by Lucas Sullivant, organized a proposal to locate the state capital on ground sufficiently elevated to protect it from flooding. The proposition was accepted, largely through the influence of Senator Joseph Foos, and Columbus was established as the permanent seat of government of the state. Lyne Starling, Sullivant's brother-in-law, along with John Kerr, James Johnston, and Alexander McLaughlin, offered the state legislature a tract of land on the high banks of the Scioto River across from Franklinton. The legislature accepted the offer on February 14, 1812, and named the new capital Columbus one week later.

On February 15, 1815, Sullivant secured the right to build the first bridge between Franklinton and Columbus, and in 1816 the first toll bridge opened. He permitted those attending religious services to cross free of charge on the Sabbath. The Franklin Bank of Columbus was incorporated by act of the legislature on February 23, 1816. Sullivant became its first president, retiring after two years of service.

== Death ==
The summer and autumn of 1823 brought a severe epidemic of bilious and intermittent fevers to Franklin County. The 1858 History of Franklin County recorded that the season exceeded anything before known for sickness, with whole families prostrate and without well members enough to care for the sick. Sullivant was among those who did not recover. He died on August 8, 1823. The following notice appeared in the Columbus Gazette of August 14, 1823: "Died — In Franklinton, on Friday last, Lucas Sullivant, Esq. In the death of this active and enterprising citizen..." The 1858 county history described him as "the leading pioneer in Franklin County — a man of enterprise, good judgment, and great energy of character."

Sullivant was buried next to Sarah in the Old Franklinton Cemetery on River Street. He was later reinterred at Green Lawn Cemetery in Columbus, where he was buried alongside other early settlers of Franklin County.

== Places and memorials ==
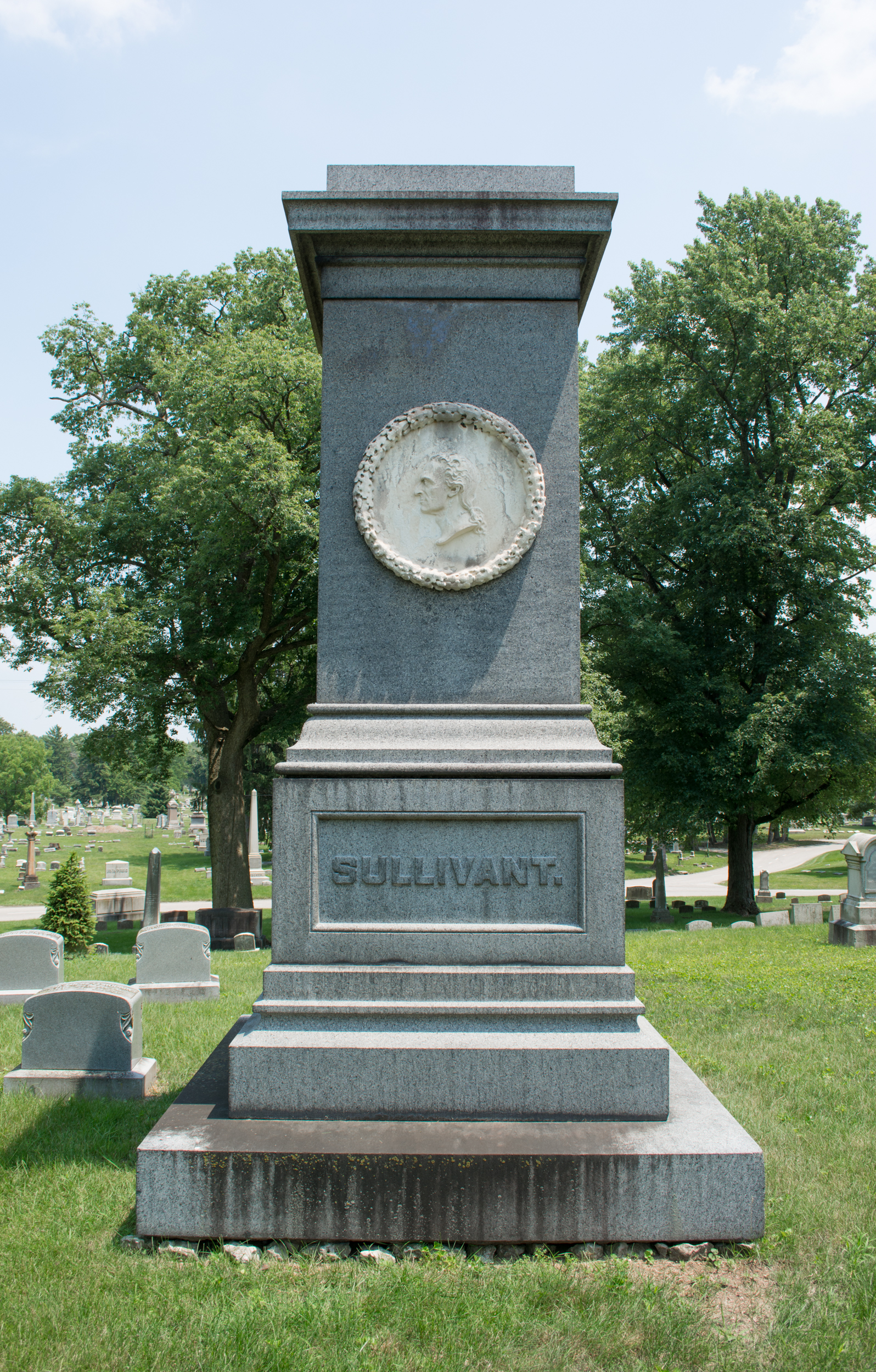
Lucas Sullivant grave marker

Several streets, neighborhoods, buildings, and public monuments in Columbus and Franklin County bear Sullivant's name.

Sullivant Avenue runs east to west through Franklinton and the neighborhoods to its west and is one of the oldest thoroughfares on Columbus's west side. It was named for Lucas Sullivant; part of it once fell within what was first called Sullivant's Hill, now known as The Hilltop. The street traces a route that in Sullivant's time marked the outer edge of his platted town and the beginning of the elevated ridge he held as farmland. It serves as one of the principal commercial corridors of the west side, running through Franklinton and along the southern boundary of The Hilltop.

Sullivant's Hill / The Hilltop refers to the elevated glacial ridge directly west of Franklinton that Sullivant included in his landholdings following his surveying work in 1795. The Hilltop derives its name from Lucas Sullivant, who was among the first to be granted a deed to this land. For a time the area was known as Sullivant's Hill; as ownership transferred across generations, the name evolved into The Hilltop.

Sullivant chose to reside in the Franklinton area while granting approximately 1,600 acres to his sons, making them the first landowners in what would become The Hilltop. The land remained within the family for over a hundred years, passing from heir to heir. During this early period, The Hilltop remained a largely rural area, with farmers producing corn, clover seed, and hay and raising livestock.

By 1856, an estimated 35 different families owned land in the area. Construction of the National Road through the ridge in the 1830s, later known as West Broad Street, brought the first significant development to The Hilltop. The Greater Hilltop today is one of the largest neighborhoods in Columbus, its boundaries running from the I-70 corridor to the east, Hague Avenue to the west, the railroad tracks to the north, and Sullivant Avenue to the south. The Sullivant Land Office is a small brick building constructed around 1822, when Sullivant was actively selling and managing land in and around Franklinton. It is the only remaining structure associated with Lucas Sullivant in the Franklinton area. In the early 1980s, the Columbus Recreation and Parks Department moved the building from its original location at 714 W. Gay Street to 13 N. Gift Street, behind the William Henry Harrison Headquarters, after the structure was endangered by vandalism, deterioration, and plans to create a park on the original site.

The building has been restored to reflect an early-1800s land office and is used for educational programming by the Columbus Historical Society, which took ownership of the site in 2021. It was listed on the National Register of Historic Places in 1973 and on the Columbus Register of Historic Properties in 1985. The statue of Lucas Sullivant stands in Genoa Park on the west bank of the Scioto River in downtown Columbus. The heroic-sized bronze depicts Sullivant standing on a plinth, a flag suspended from a pole in his left hand and his right hand raised to shade his eyes as he looks into the distance. The plinth bears scenes from Franklinton's beginnings. The sculpture was created by Michael Foley, commissioned by the Franklinton Historical Society, and unveiled on May 6, 2000. It is the city's principal public memorial to the founder of Franklinton.

== Sullivant's legacy and descendants ==
At the time of his death, Sullivant was one of the largest landowners in Ohio. No photograph or engraving of him is known to survive. His son Joseph recorded that Sullivant was of medium height, muscular and well-proportioned, quick and active in his movements, with an erect carriage, a broad and high forehead, an aquiline nose, blue-grey eyes, a firm mouth, and a square chin. He was firm and positive in his own opinions, but courteous in manners and expression.

His eldest son, William Starling Sullivant (1803–1873), became the leading American bryologist of his time. His studies of bryophytes, including mosses and liverworts, formed the basis for further investigation of these plants in the United States. On his father's death in 1823, he assumed management of the family properties in Ohio before turning his focus to botany around 1834. At the time of his death, William Starling Sullivant was recognized as the foremost bryologist in the United States and was posthumously elected to the National Academy of Sciences in 1872. A moss, Sullivantia ohioensis, was named in his honor.

The 1880 History of Franklin and Pickaway Counties, drawing on tributes from those who knew him, recorded: "Sullivant possessed a great spirit of liberality, which an ample fortune acquired by his own industry enabled him to gratify. He was a man of strict integrity, of the most persevering industry and rigid economy; a kind and indulgent father, a sincere and hospitable friend, and a generous neighbor." His physician, Dr. John Edmiston, said: "Take him all in all, with his strong and vigorous intellect, his knowledge of human nature, his decision of character, good judgment, and high sense of personal honor and integrity, he is one of the most remarkable men I ever knew. He seemed born to be a leader."

== Sources ==
- "Lucas Sullivant". Franklinton Historical Society.
- "War of 1812". Franklinton Historical Society.
- "History Lesson: Lucas Sullivant, Pioneer of Franklinton". Columbus Underground. 2012.
- "Lucas Sullivant". City of Columbus.
- "Founding Franklinton, Columbus: A Created Capital". WOSU Public Media.
- "Surveyor's Journal Entry Four". Franklin County Engineer's Office.
- "History of the Office". Franklin County Clerk of Courts.
- "Franklin County History: County Recorders". Franklin County, Ohio History (1858).
- "Lucas Sullivant". 1880 History of Franklin and Pickaway Counties, Ohio.
- "Lucas Sullivant: His Personality and Adventures". Ohio History Journal. 37: 177–189. 1928.
- "The Ohio-Columbus Centennial". Ohio History Journal. 37: 161–176. 1928.
- "A History of Banking in Ohio". Ohio History Journal. 23: 312–322. 1914.
- "Lucas Sullivant Statue". Ohio Outdoor Sculpture.
- "Harrison House and Sullivant Land Office". Columbus Historical Society.
- "As It Were: Lucas Sullivant's run ended at the forks of the Scioto, Olentangy rivers". ThisWeek News. 2021.
- "Suffering on Sullivant: Part 2". USA Today Network. 2019.
- "History: Early History of Wilshire Heights". Wilshire Heights Community.
- "William Starling Sullivant". Encyclopædia Britannica.
- "Peering Back In Time: 19th Century Microscope Slides of William Sullivant". Ohio History Connection.
- "Green Lawn Cemetery: Lucas Sullivant". Ohio Exploration.
