= Stenodesmus (plant) =

Scientific classification
- Kingdom: Plantae
- Division: Bryophyta
- Class: Bryopsida
- Subclass: Bryidae
- Order: Hookeriales
- Family: Callicostaceae
- Genus: Stenodesmus (Mitt.) A.Jaeger
- Species: S. tenuicuspis

Binomial name
- Stenodesmus tenuicuspis (Mitt.) A.Jaeger

Synonyms
- Genus: Hookeria sect. Stenodesmus Mitt.; Species: Hookeria tenuicuspis Mitt.

Genus of mosses

Stenodesmus is a monotypic genus of mosses in the family Callicostaceae containing only the species Stenodesmus tenuicuspis. It is native to Central America and western South America.
