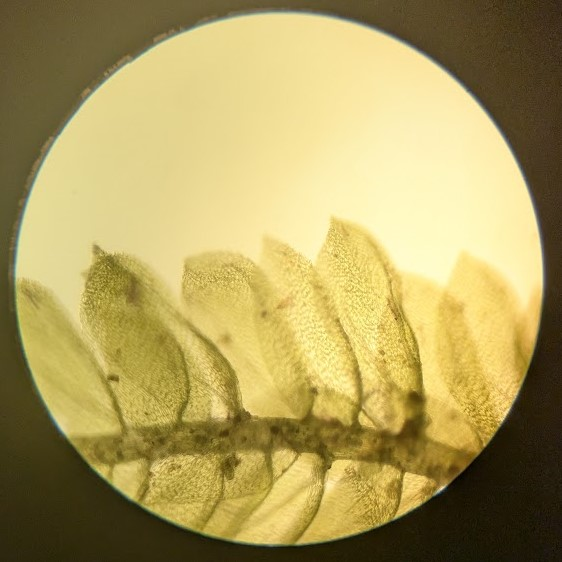
- Callicostella belangeriana under 100x magnification.

Scientific classification
- Kingdom: Plantae
- Division: Bryophyta
- Class: Bryopsida
- Subclass: Bryidae
- Order: Hookeriales
- Family: Callicostaceae; Kindb.

Genera
- See classification

= Callicostaceae =

Family of mosses

Callicostaceae is a family of pleurocarpous mosses in the order Hookeriales. It includes 21 genera. It is primarily tropical and epiphytic or epiphyllous.

== Description ==
Members of the family are characterized by a double costa, sometimes with hyalodermis, and no alar differentiation. Leaves are usually complanate and may by asymmetrical along the dorsal/ventral axis. Leaf margins are dentate to serrate, bordered or not, and often reduced. Laminal cells are isodiametric to linear and smooth to papillose. The sporophyte seta is long, but many other characters vary genus to genus.

== Nomenclatural history ==
The name Pilotrichaceae has long been, and continues to be, used for this group. However the type of the genus Pilotrichum is Leptodon smithii, which is a member of Neckeraceae, and therefore Pilotrichaceae is not available under the ICNafp as a name for this group. The genus Callicosta was introduced for the Pilotrichum species belonging to this group, and was made the type genus.

== Classification ==
As reported by Tropicos and World Flora Online:

- Actinodontium Schwägr.
- Amblytropis (Mitt.) Broth.
- Brymela Crosby & B.H.Allen
- Callicosta Müll.Hal.
- Callicostella (Müll.Hal.) Mitt.
- Callicostellopsis Broth.
- Crossomitrium Müll. Hal.
- Cyclodictyon Mitt.
- Diploneuron E.B.Bartram
- Helicoblepharum (Spruce ex Mitt.) Broth.
- Hemiragis (Brid.) Brid.
- Hypnella (Müll. Hal.) A.Jaeger
- Lepidopilidium (Müll.Hal.) Broth.
- Lepidopilum (Brid.) Brid.
- Neohypnella E.B.Bartram
- Philophyllum Müll.Hal.
- Pilotrichidium Besch.
- Stenodesmus (Mitt.) A.Jaeger
- Stenodictyon (Mitt.) A.Jaeger
- Tachypodium Schimp.
- Thamniopsis (Mitt.) M.Fleisch.
- Trachyxiphium W.R.Buck
