= The Hilltop (Columbus, Ohio) =

Neighborhood of Columbus in Franklin County, Ohio, United States

Hilltop, Columbus
- Neighborhood of Columbus
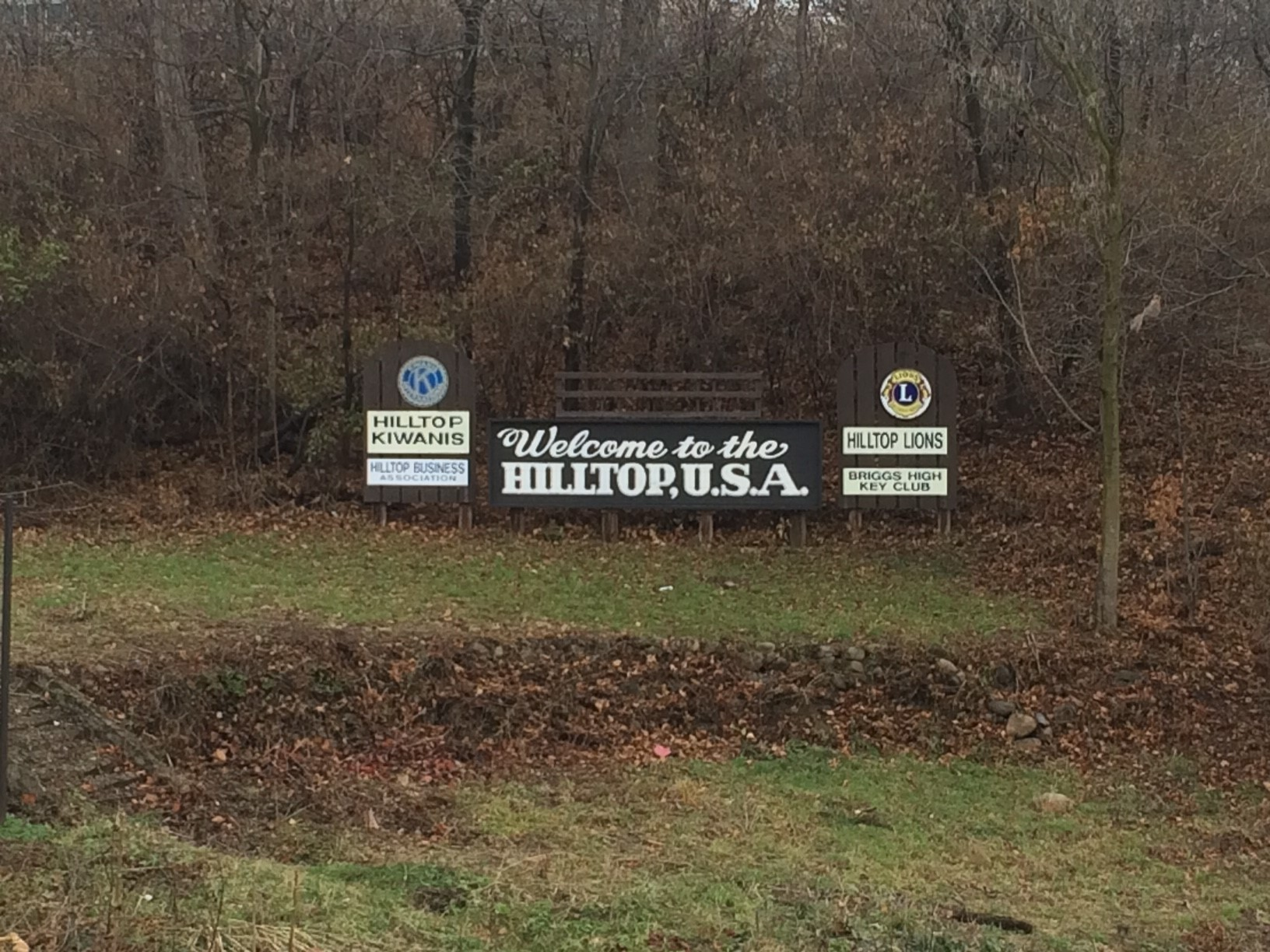
- Hilltop, USA sign welcoming visitors to area
- Motto: A Neighborhood of Neighborhoods
- Interactive map of Hilltop, Columbus
- Coordinates: 39°57′0″N 83°5′0″W
- Country: United States
- State: Ohio
- County: Franklin
- City: Columbus
- Postal codes: 43204, 43228, 43223

The Hilltop is one of the largest neighborhoods in Columbus, Ohio, located west of Franklinton and Downtown. The Greater Hilltop area contains newer and historic neighborhoods, schools, various stores, industrial areas, and recreational facilities. The development pattern is considered a distinct suburb. The majority of the area is predominantly single family residential.

== History ==
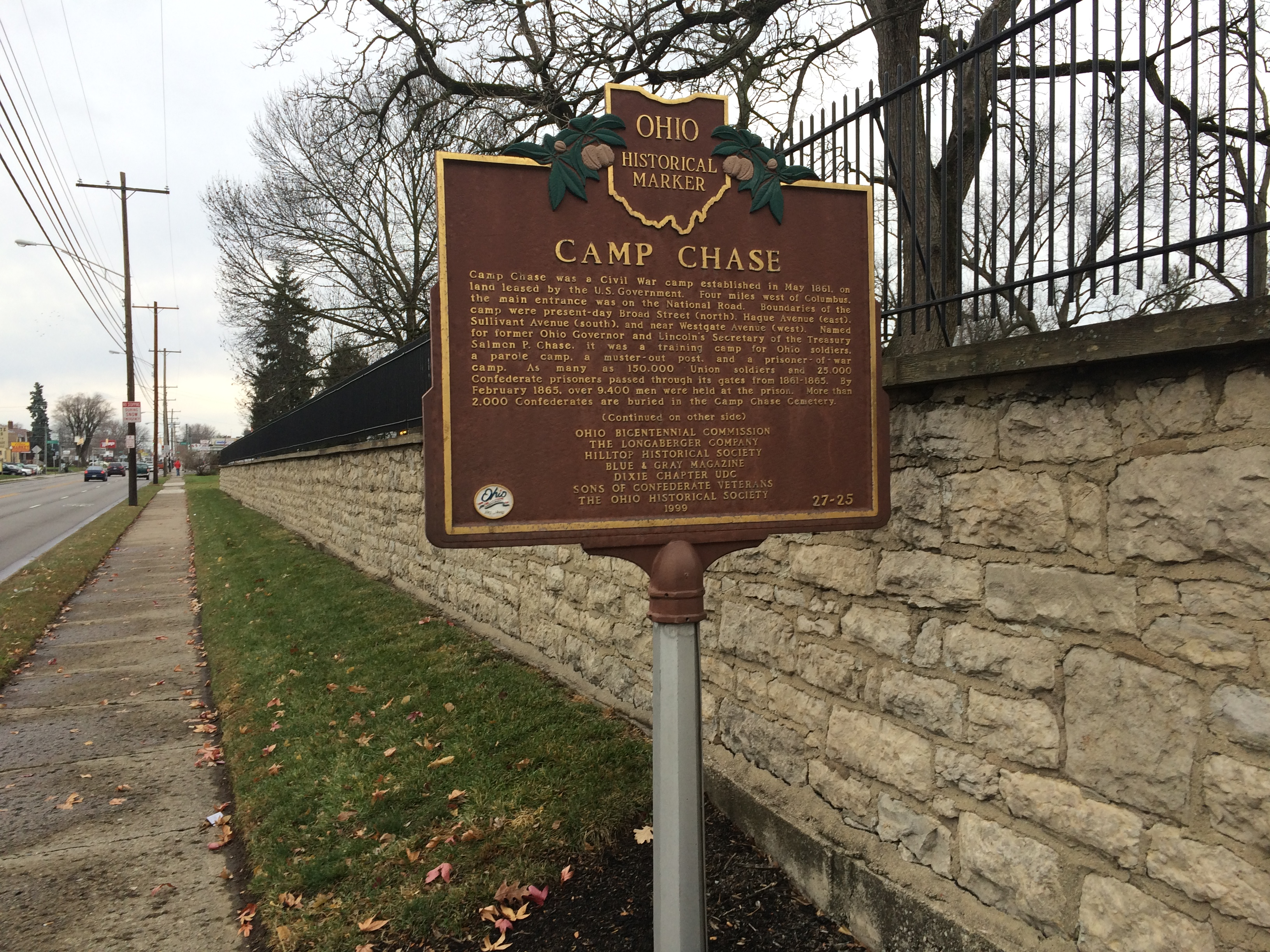
Camp Chase state historical marker

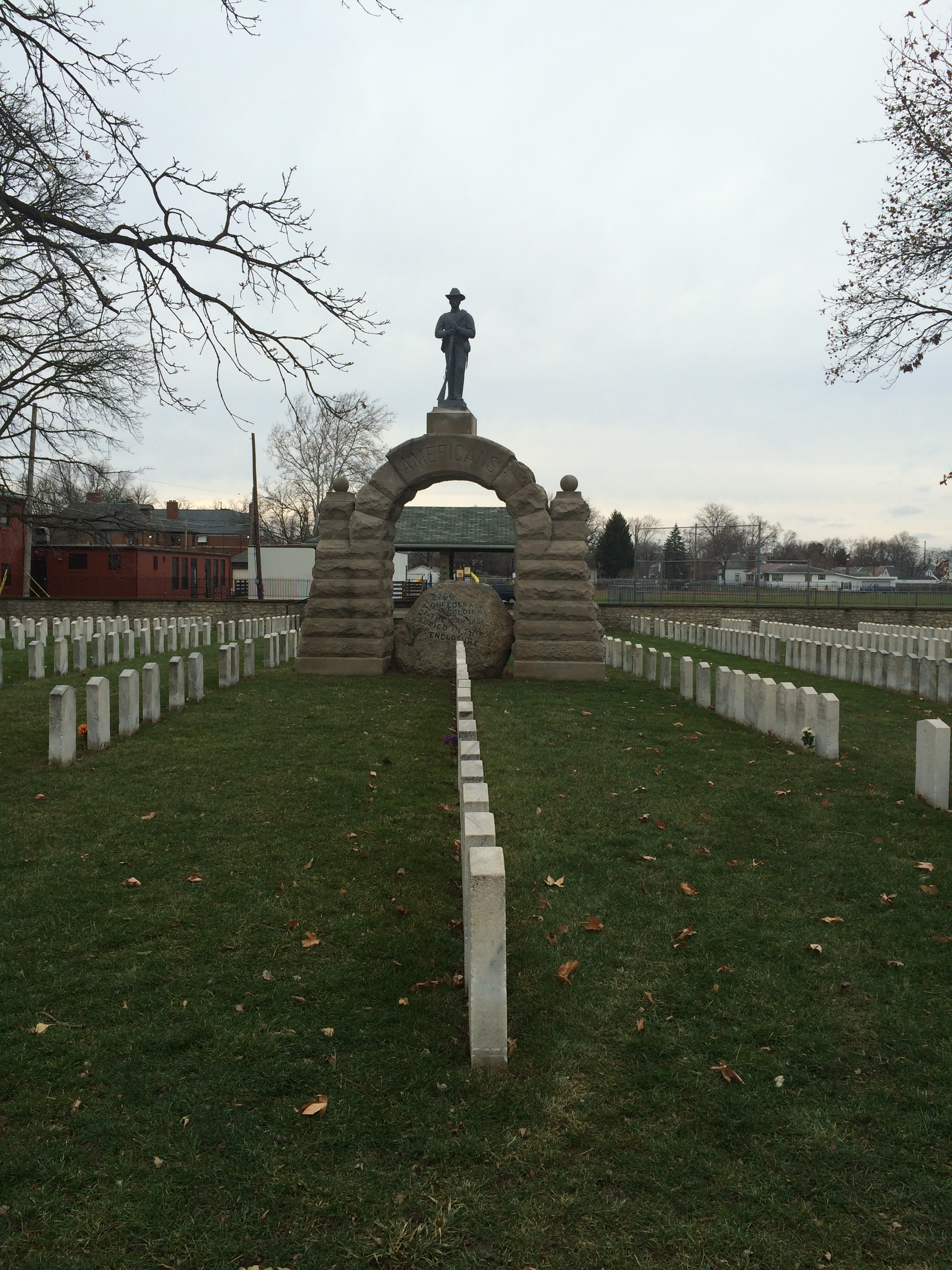
Camp Chase, a memorial to 2,260 Confederate soldiers from the Civil War who died in Camp Chase.

=== Etymology ===
The name of this area derives from Lucas Sullivant, who was first deeded this land. For a time the area was known as Sullivant’s Hill and as time went on, the ownership of the land was transferred and the name was changed to The Hilltop. As the area is an assortment of smaller neighborhoods, "The Greater Hilltop" is used in some publications to describe this neighborhood, while "The Hilltop" is used almost exclusively.

=== Early history ===
The first inhabitants of this area were Native Americans, whose remains are scattered throughout the area. This area was vital due to its geographical characteristics, as the hill which became its namesake as well as its surrounding fertile land. Lucas Sullivant came to this land in 1795 and became the first man to be granted a deed. Sullivant chose to reside in the Franklinton area while giving 1600 acres of land to his sons, making them the first landowners in The Hilltop. The land stayed within the family for over a hundred years, as the land was transferred from heir to heir.

During this early period, The Hilltop remained a largely rural area, with a number of farmers producing corn, cloverseed and hay as well as raising livestock. The National Road or Route 40 was the first major development in the area. This road, which later became known as Broad Street, was built in the 1830s and become home to various landmarks such as the Four-Mile House and the Jaybird Hotel. One of the most important establishments of this era was Camp Chase, a staging and training ground for the Union during the Civil War. It was also known as the largest prisoner camp in the north, with over 9,000 prisoners in 1865. Upon the camp's closing, a small portion became a cemetery and memorial for Confederate soldiers.

=== 20th century ===
The The Hilltop Area was once home to the Columbus State Hospital for the Insane. Built in 1870, this hospital was a staple of the neighborhood and its impact has been felt ever since. Bordered by Broad St. to the south and Wheatland Ave. to the west, this site served as a gateway into the community. The style of this hospital was very similar to a hospital in Athens, Ohio, yet significantly larger. This building followed the Kirkbride Plan, a system established to provide "air and sunlight" in order to cure its patients. The building was closed in the 1980s, and subsequently torn down and replaced by offices of the Ohio Department of Public Safety and Ohio Department of Transportation. This hospital as well as the Columbus State Institute employed nearly 450 people, many of whom lived in The Hilltop.

During the early 20th century, The Hilltop began its transition from a farming to an urban community. Subdivisions began to form around this time around the Columbus State Institution and streets were formed along rural roads. Its own streetcar system came with the introduction of these roads, which ran from High Street to the Columbus State Hospital. Businesses began to emerge along Broad Street, from a small grocery store to a meat market. By 1900, there were over 2000 residents in The Hilltop. The majority of the population were young married couples with a few small children at this time with various occupations. The early 20th century laid the groundwork for the infrastructure of the area and encouraged growth and expansion. After the 1913 flood, there was a large population surge as the community was able to adapt due to its existing infrastructure.

Also during the early 20th century, The Hilltop became the home for many "well-to-do" African American families who owned large parcels of land still used for farming and other entrepreneurial endeavors. One such family was the Carter family, whose migration from Virginia to Ohio had occurred years earlier. The matriarch of the family was actually a native American and the patriarch an African American. Together throughout the period of 1900-1940, they had 11 children, many of whom went on to become civic leaders in Columbus, Dayton and other Ohio and California cities. Most notably, Mary Carter Glascor, and her brother, Judge Russell Carter are known for their outstanding service to their communities and universities. Both are graduates of The Ohio State University and went on to obtain graduate and higher degrees, from various schools, including Harvard University.

By 1924, the population had reached 15,000 and the community was self-sustaining with schools, employment and services for its residents. Growth slowed during the war years, but following the war it began to increase yet again. Many businesses were prospering at the time and The Hilltop's political activeness was at its peak. With the mayor of Columbus hailing from The Hilltop, there was a strong sense of community within the area. With General Motors (Fisher Body and Delphi divisions) being the source of jobs for many local residents. As time went on, The Hilltop became susceptible to many of the same problems as other urban areas as businesses began to close and residents moved further outside the city limits.

=== Modern era ===
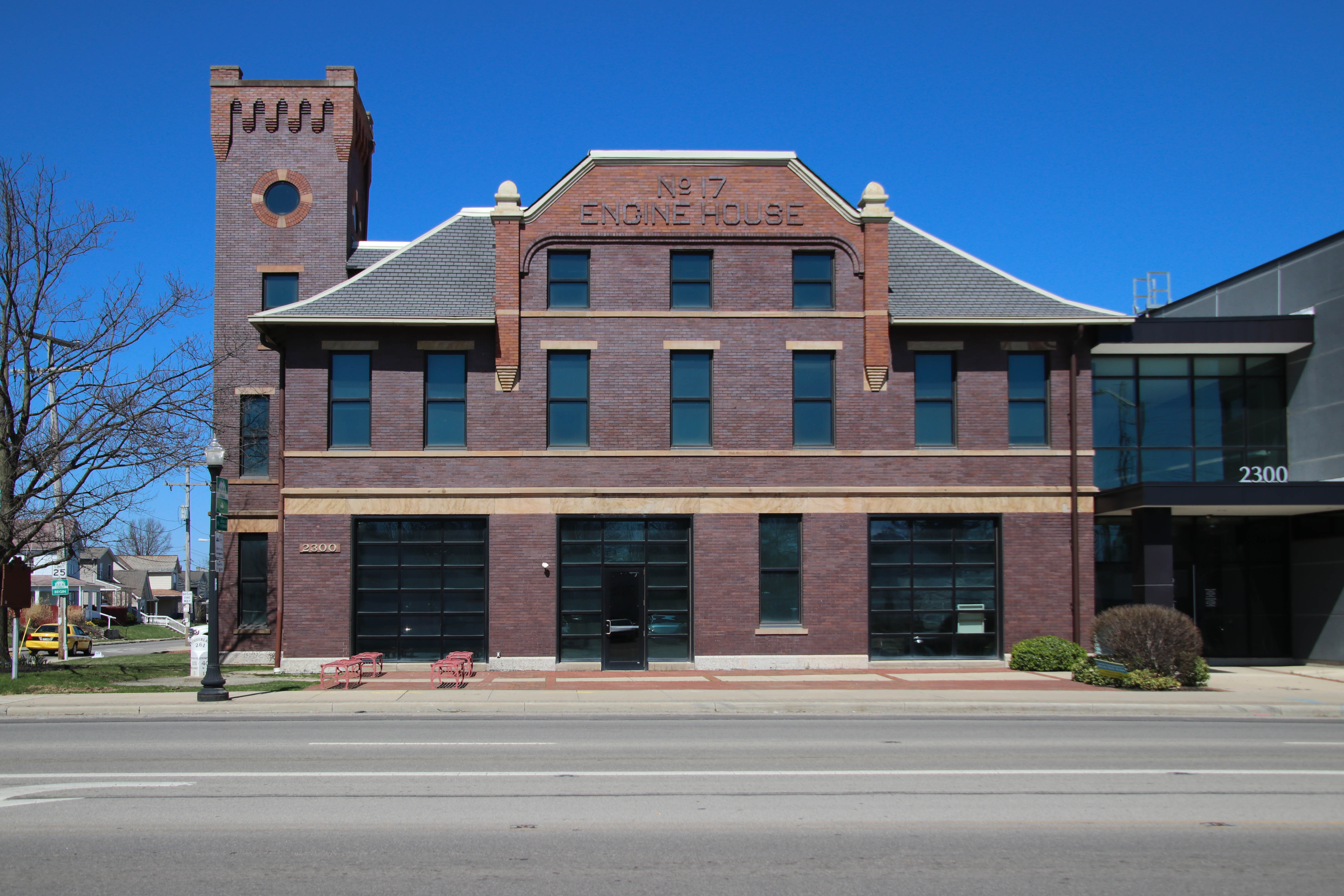
The modern Westside Family Health Center occupies the c. 1913 Engine House No. 17

Similar to many urban neighborhoods, as jobs left the area, poverty took their place. The foundation set by the community remains, but the area has lost many residents and some of its major employers, causing a slow decline over recent years. Some of the plans created for this area include 2008 The Hilltop/West Broad Corridor Market Analysis and the 2005 West Broad Street Economic Development Strategy, which were developed for portions of the planning area. The Hilltop/West Broad Corridor Market Analysis detailed a market analysis for land uses along West Broad Street from Highland to Demorest avenues. The West Broad Street Economic Development Strategy and The Highland West Visioning Charrette focused on the portion of West Broad Street from Highland to Terrace avenues, to provide the city and the community with a blueprint for revitalizing this portion of West Broad Street.

== Geography ==
The Hilltop is bounded by Interstate 70 in the north, the CSX railroad on the east, and Interstate 270 on the south and west. The Hilltop includes part or all of ZIP Codes 43204, 43222, 43223, 43123 and 43228. Its main thoroughfares are West Broad Street (U.S. Route 40) - Mound Street, and Hague Avenue. Within these bounds there are several jurisdictions including the city of Columbus, the city of Urbancrest, the village of Valleyview, Franklin County, Franklin Township, Jackson Township and Prairie Township. This area covers approximately 9,917 acres. Just east of this area is a neighborhood by the name of Franklinton. The name, "The Greater Hilltop", indicates an opportunity for the community to help shape and direct the pattern of growth and the character of future development in the neighborhood.

== Transportation ==
From its establishment, The Hilltop has long been a corridor of vibrant transportation. Beginning with the creation of the National Road, residents as well as visitors used the area to move throughout Columbus. Establishments such as Camp Chase and the Columbus State Hospital brought more people to the area. With the inception of a streetcar system, The Hilltop began to transform into a more urban area, with transportation being its catalyst. Various railways also traversed the area, making it a prime location for commerce, which led to it being selected to home a General Motors plant. The freeways that surround the area, routes 270 and 70, played a crucial role in laying the boundaries. Currently the area is automobile-focused and the main boulevards continue to adapt to the modern era.

== Demographics ==
The Hilltop area includes 67,781 residents and 25,344 households in 2010 with a population density of 4,183.7 people per square mile. The planning area was slightly older than the city as a whole with a median age of 34 years (the city was 31 years). The Greater Hilltop population decreased 1.2% between 2000 and 2010, while the number of households decreased by 1.2% as well, indicating a gradual reduction in the average household size, a common trend found in many areas of Columbus. The Hispanic population has been increasing along with an emerging Somali population.

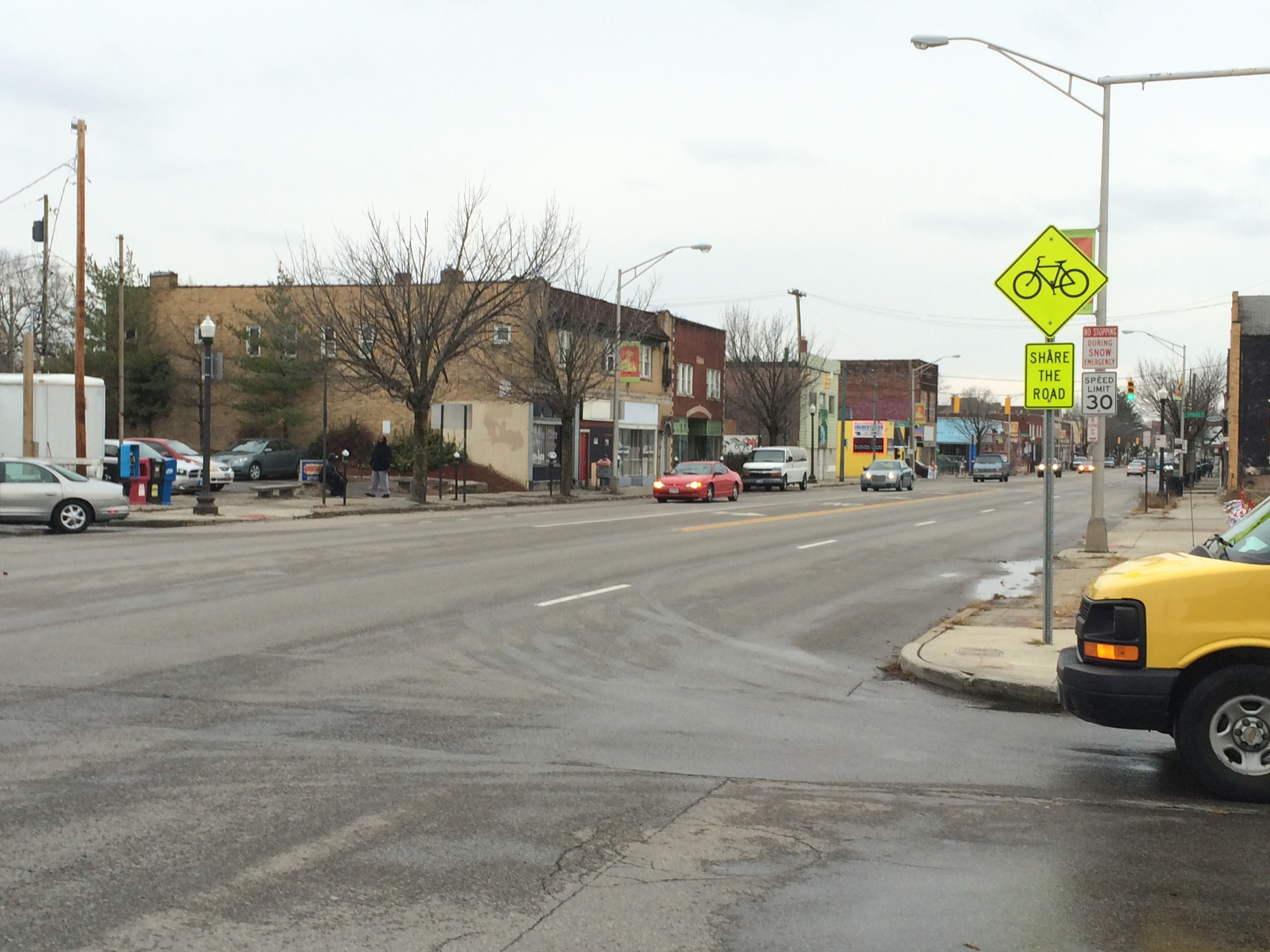
Broad Street, one of the main thoroughfares of The Hilltop.

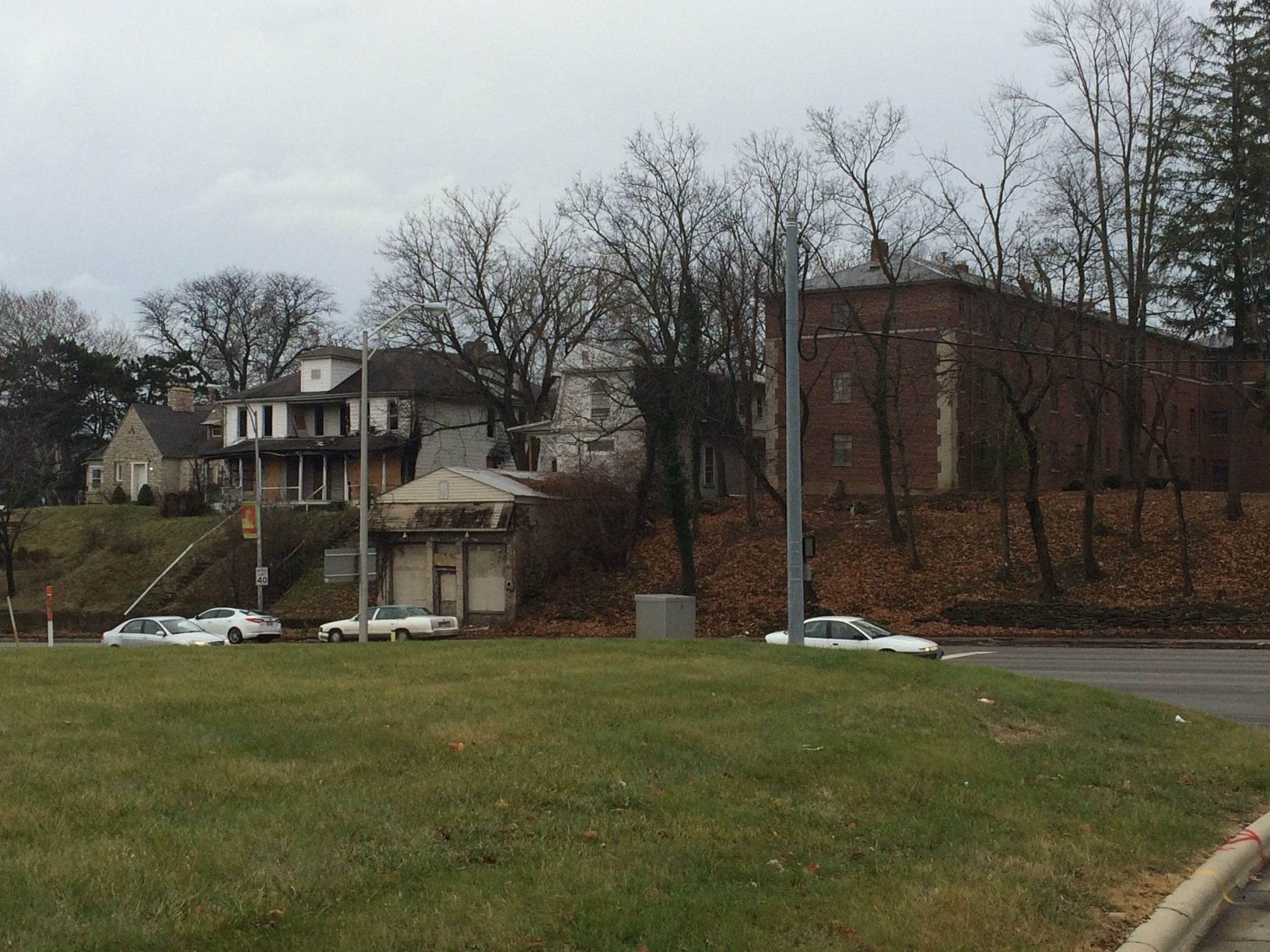
Housing stock found throughout The Hilltop.

== Structures and landmarks ==
This area was once home to the Columbus State Hospital for the Insane, until its demolition in 1997. Offices for the Ohio Department of Transportation and Ohio Department of Public Safety were built upon this site, where they still stand to this day. This area is also home to a branch of the Columbus Metropolitan Library, one of the largest branches in Columbus. The Hilltop is also home to Camp Chase, a Union camp from the Civil war. There also once stood a Quaker church, as Quaker settlers moved into this area following the Civil War.

== Land use ==
The Greater Hilltop provides a mix of land uses. Much of the existing land use is residential (51%) followed by industrial (16%) that provides employment for the region. More than 50% of commercial (9%) land use is with community scale. Institutional (7%), parks and open space (7%), vacant property (4%), office (3%), agriculture and utilities (2%) fills the other quarter of the land use. The development of Greater The Hilltop followed an east to west pattern. The eastern portion of The Hilltop was first settled in the early 1800s. Accordingly, the community's earliest neighborhoods, parks and commercial uses are located here. The development pattern to the south and west takes on a distinctly suburban feel; commercial uses are larger, auto-oriented retailers and residential uses change from a traditional grid street pattern to winding subdivision streets.

The City of Columbus has designated a portion of The Hilltop as a Community Reinvestment Area that is "ready for revitalization", with available 15-year, 100 percent tax abatements for all projects that include 10 percent affordable housing, with options to buy out of the requirement.

=== Residential ===
Majority of the residential land use is for single family (81%). Multifamily (14%) and two-three family (5%) only make up the remainder percentage. Most single and two-three family residential units are in the interior of the area. Single family units are considerably bounded by W Broad Street and I-270. Multifamily units are typically located on the major corridors, such as West Broad Street and Sullivant Avenue.

=== Commercial/industrial ===
Commercial uses are along the primary corridors—West Broad Street, Sullivant Avenue, Georgesville Road. They are mostly community-scale commercial uses as well as automobile-oriented commercial uses. Manufacturing is primarily located in the northwest portion of the planning area. Both West Broad Street and Sullivant Avenue corridors are zoned almost entirely commercial. Economic development of The Greater Hilltop area has been a major concern recently; focus has been given to revitalizing the east of West Broad Street, and the West Broad Street Economic Development Strategy was adopted in 2005 and in the Highland West Visioning Charrette (2006). The study recommends to redevelop vacant retail spaces and to build medical uses and other professional uses of buildings in mixed-use concepts, especially in the older more historic area of the Highland West District created by the City in 2004. Industrial land is generally located in the northwest quadrant of the area.

== Entertainment ==
Various recreational services are available to The Hilltop residents.

Summer Jam West is a grassroots, free music and arts festival held annually in Westgate Park on the second Saturday in July. Live local bands, local art for sale, local hand crafted items, food trucks, free face painting and a free Children's Art zone are a few of the activities available. Summer Jam strives to leave permanent art on The The Hilltop. In 2015, they installed the first permanent art sculpture on The Hilltop. "On the Wings of Change" is a 14' stainless steel and copper sculpture of a monarch butterfly and can be located near the enclosed shelter house in Westgate Park. The sculpture was designed and built by artist, Rachel Pace of Steeling Copper Metal Studio. In 2016, Summer Jam commissioned Danielle Poling to paint an 80' "Fantastic Food Garden" on the west facing wall of the racquetball court in Westgate Park. In 2017, Roger J. Williams was commissioned to paint a 95' Movin' & Groovin' mural along the Camp Chase Multi-Use Trail. Also installed in 2017 was an 8' X 4' art panel by Brian Marcus on Cream & Sugar and an 8' X 4' art panel by Tiffany Christopher.

=== Parks ===
- Georgian Heights Park
- Glenwood Park
- Holton Park
- Glenview Park
- Wrexham Park
- Rhodes Park
- Hilltonia Park
- Big Run Park
- Westmoor Park
- Westgate Park
- Lindbergh Park
- Stephans Drive Park
- Hauntz Park
- Camp Chase Trail

=== Recreation centers ===
- Glenwood
- Westgate
- Holton
- Lindbergh Elementary

== Education and institutions ==
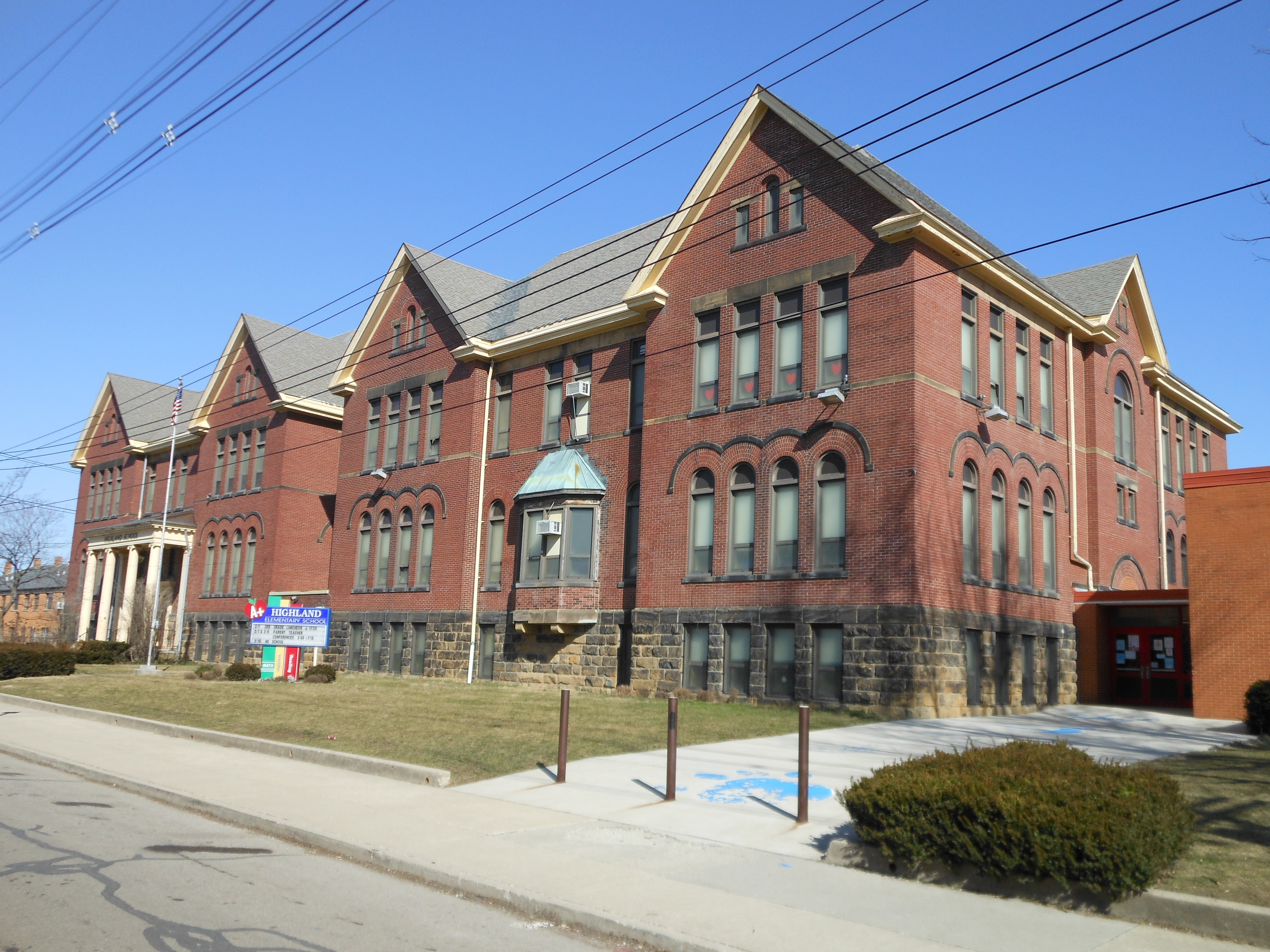
Highland Elementary School

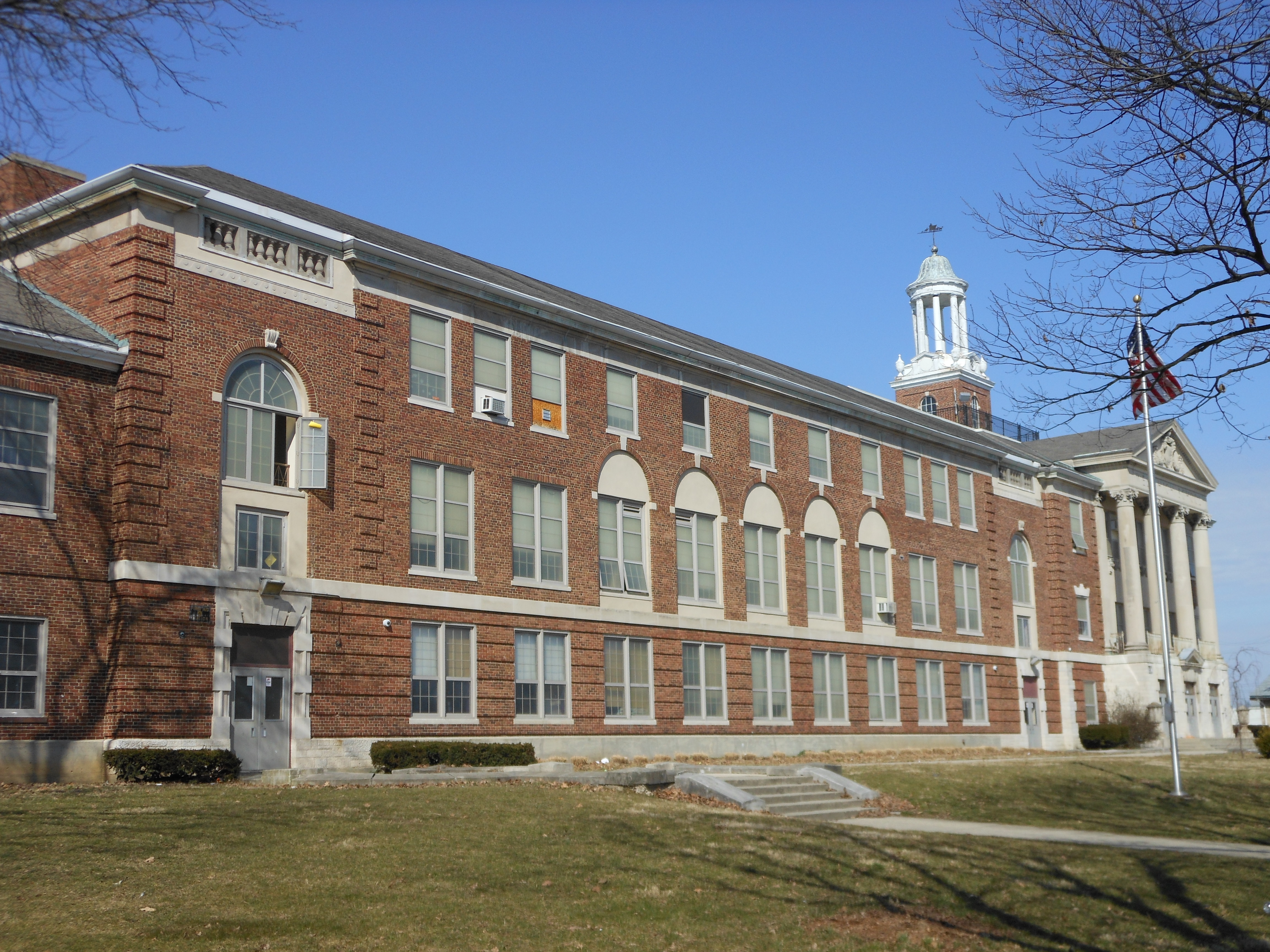
West High School

- Columbus Metropolitan Library - The Hilltop Branch This is one of the largest branches in the Columbus Metro Library system. It contains approximately 50,000 volumes, films, and magazines which are available for public use. The Hilltop Branch offers a large children's department.
- Briggs High School
- The Highland West Civic Association
- Highland Elementary School
- Highland Youth Garden
- The Hilltop Business Association
- The Hilltop Early Learning Center
- The Hilltop Historical Society
- The Hilltop Kiwanis
- The Hilltop Preschool
- The Greater Hilltop Area Shalom Zone
- Homes on the Hill Community Development Corporation
- West High School
- West High School Alumni Association

== Gallery ==
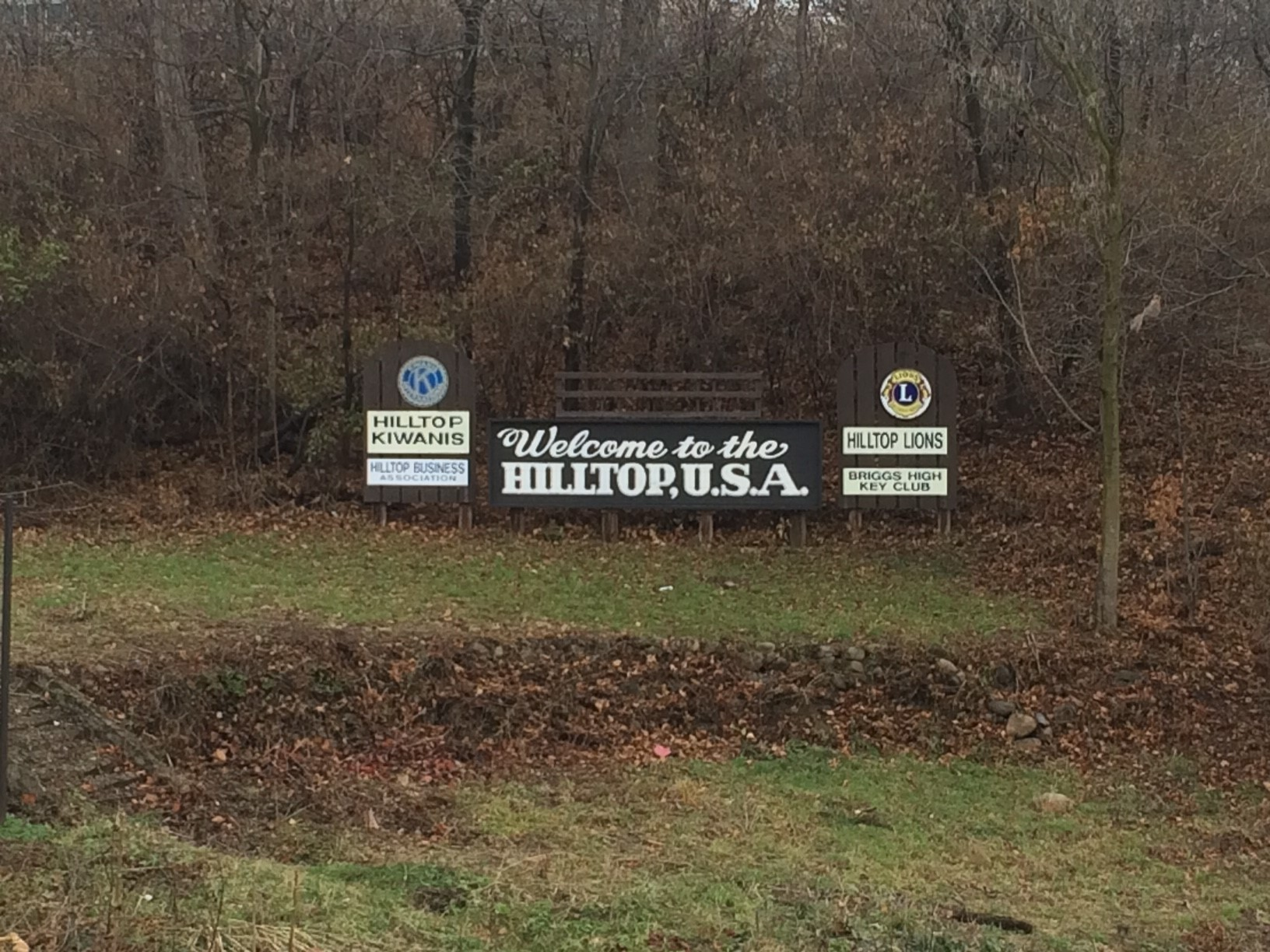
The Hilltop, USA welcoming visitors

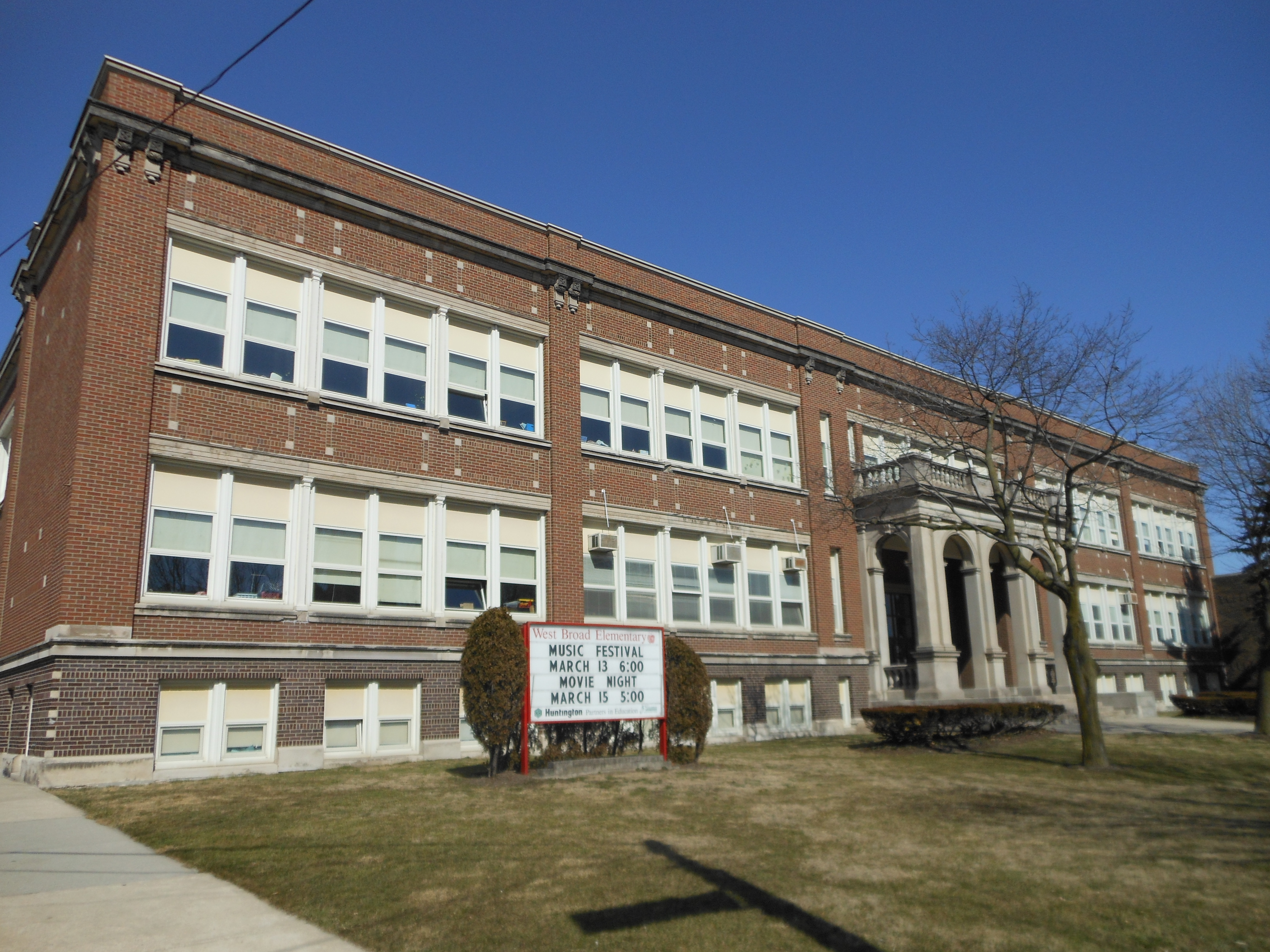
West Broad Street School

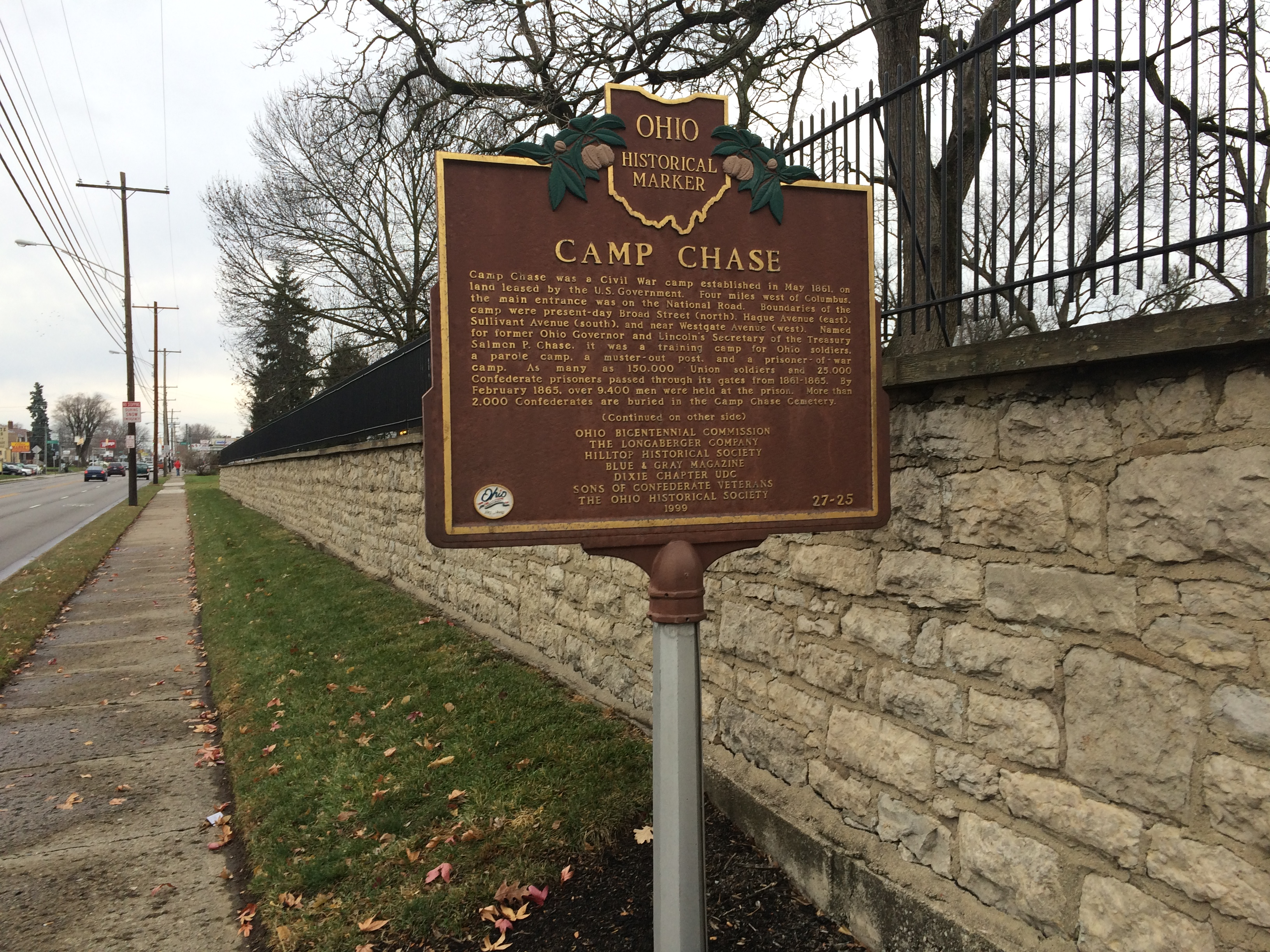
Camp Chase National Historical Marker

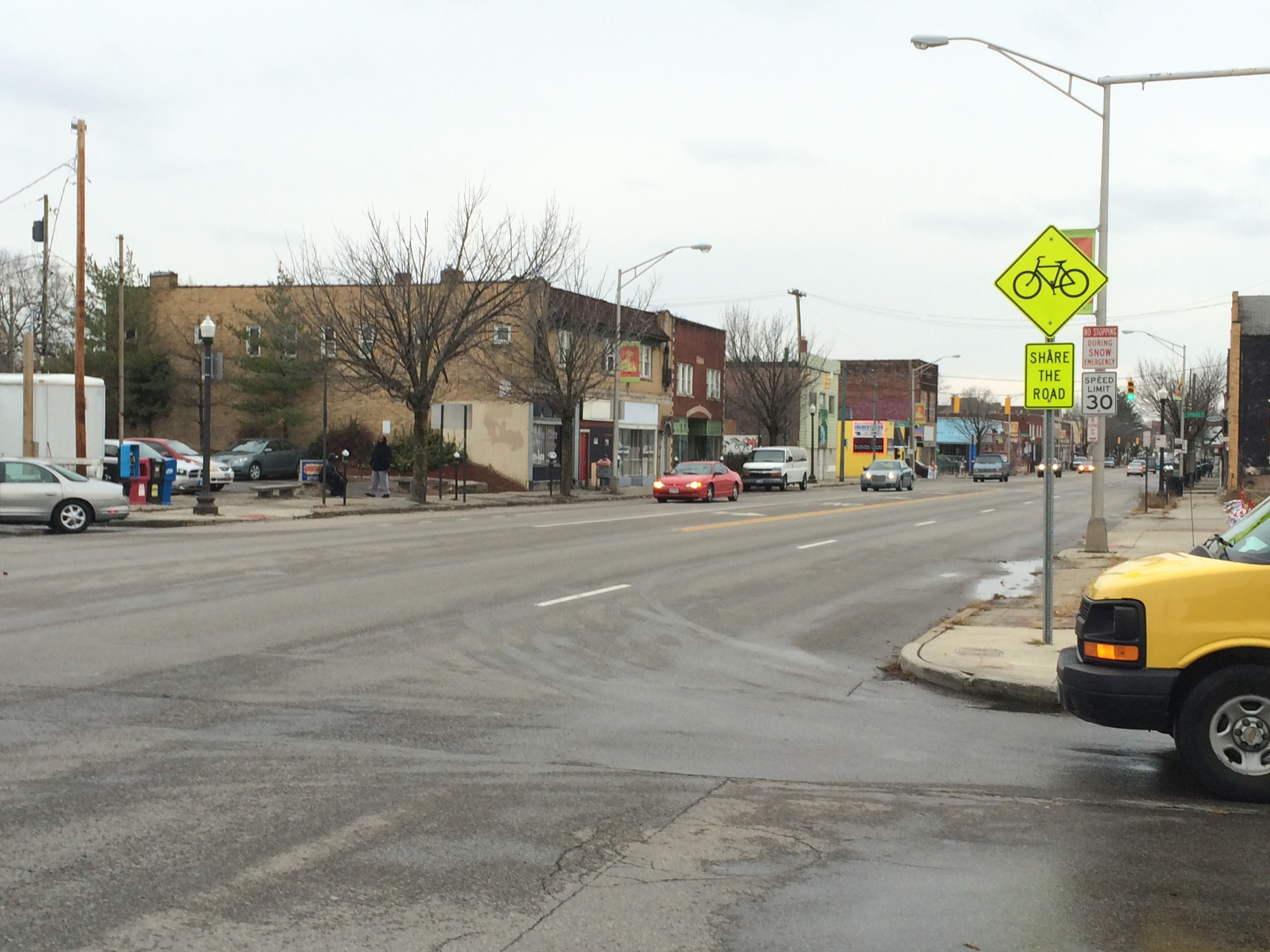
Broad Street, one of the main thoroughfares of The Hilltop

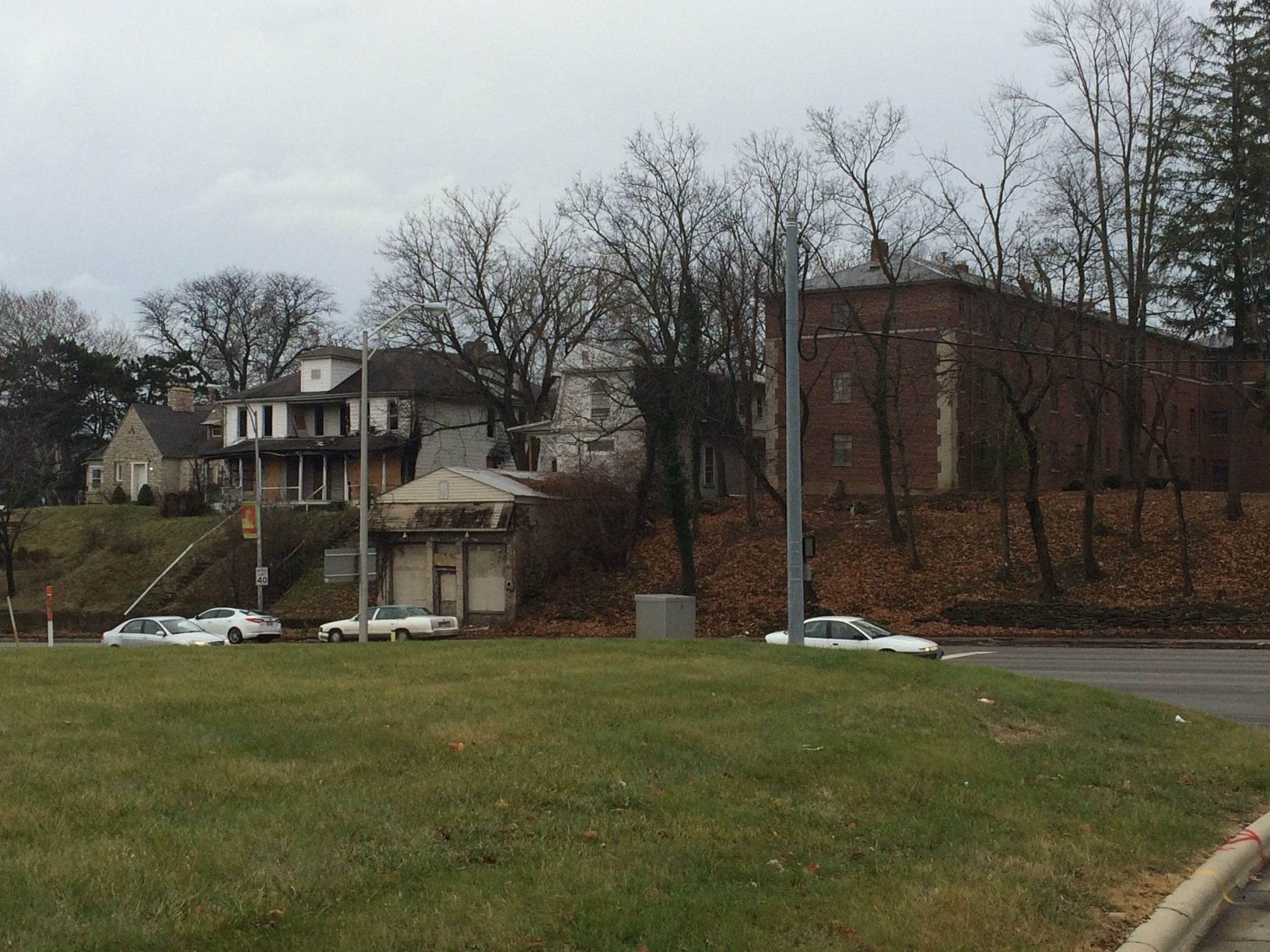
Housing stock found throughout The Hilltop

Ohio Department of Public Safety
