= Westgate (Columbus, Ohio) =

- Neighborhood
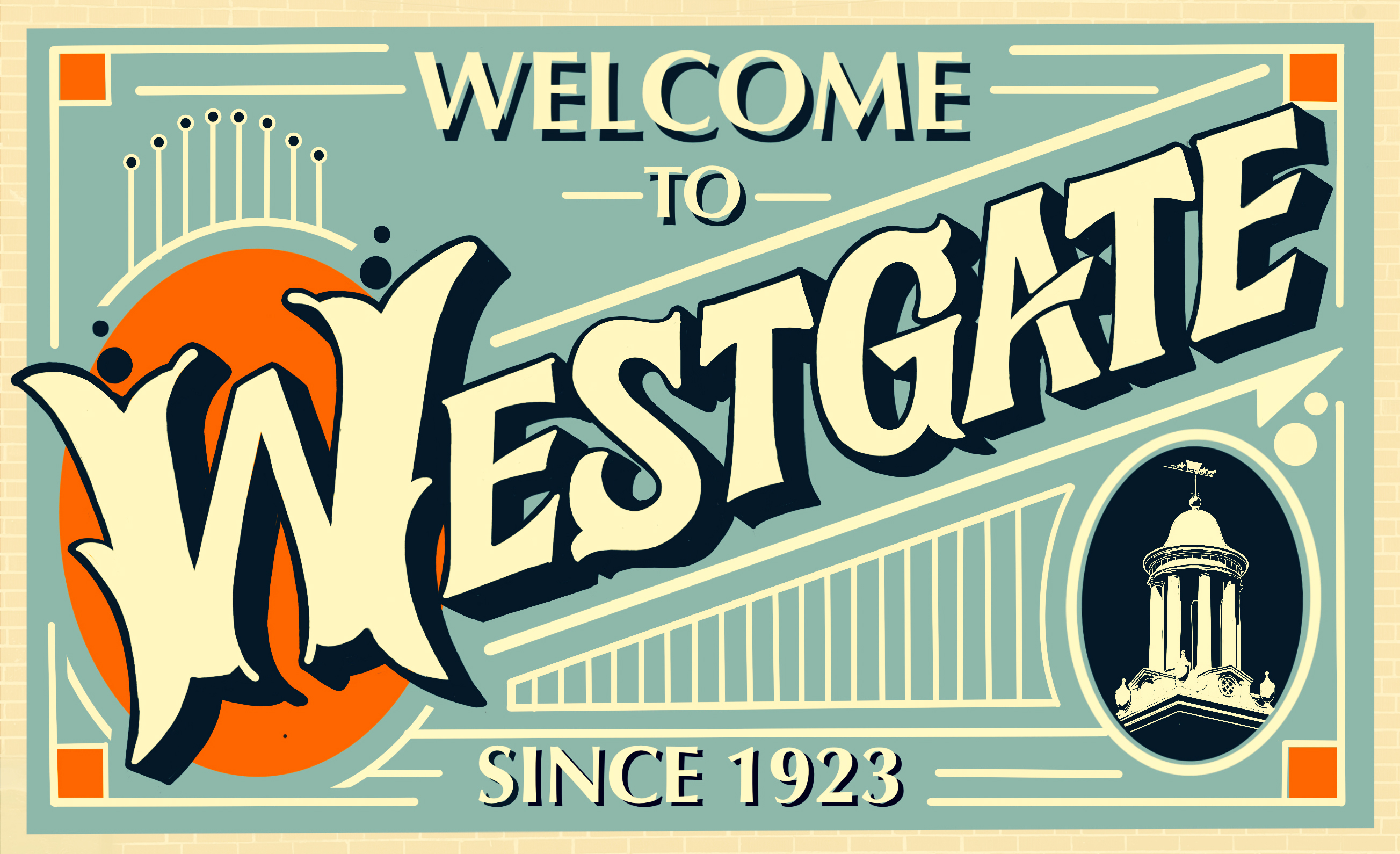
- Welcome to Westgate mural
- Country: United States
- State: Ohio
- City: Columbus
- Area: Hilltop
- Time zone: UTC−5 (EST)
  - Summer (DST): UTC−4 (EDT)
- Postal code: 43204

Westgate is a neighborhood on the west side of Columbus, Ohio, located within The Greater Hilltop. It sits about 4 miles (6.4 km) west of Downtown Columbus, with West Broad Street forming its northern edge, Sullivant Avenue its southern edge, Hague Avenue to the east, and Wilson Road to the west. John Glenn Columbus International Airport is about 13 miles (21 km) away via Interstate 670.

Westgate is known for its concentration of early 20th-century housing stock, characterized by custom-built Cape Cods, bungalows, Craftsman-style homes, and Colonial Revival houses, many of which retain original hardwood floors, natural woodwork, built-in cabinetry, and wood-burning fireplaces. Columbus Realtor Jamie Maze, team leader at Maze and Company, describes the neighborhood as "a hidden gem," noting that the age and character of the homes is a primary draw for buyers. Westgate has been described as "a nice neighborhood, with a family oriented atmosphere."

The neighborhood was built on land that used to be Camp Chase, a Civil War military camp and prison. After the war, the area was developed into a residential neighborhood in the 1920s. Today Westgate is known for its early 20th-century housing stock, its large central park, and a strong sense of community built around the Westgate Neighbors Association.

== History ==
=== Camp Chase ===
The story of Westgate begins during the American Civil War. In May 1861, the U.S. Government leased land about four miles west of Columbus to build a military facility called Camp Chase. The camp was named after Salmon P. Chase, who had been the Governor of Ohio and was serving as Secretary of the Treasury under President Abraham Lincoln. It started as a training ground for Ohio soldiers but was later converted into a prison camp for captured Confederate soldiers. Over the course of the war, as many as 150,000 Union soldiers trained there and around 25,000 Confederate prisoners were held there. By February 1865, more than 9,400 prisoners were being held at one time.

The prison population reached its highest point — 9,423 people — on January 31, 1865. By the time Camp Chase officially closed on July 5, 1865, a total of 2,229 soldiers had died there.

The only part of Camp Chase that still exists today is its cemetery, which is one of only two remaining federal Civil War properties in Columbus. The federal government purchased the site in 1879. In 1895, a former Union soldier named William H. Knauss organized the first memorial service there, and services have continued ever since. Congress passed a law in 1906 authorizing marble headstones to be placed on each grave. The contract to supply the headstones was awarded to the Blue Ridge Marble Company of Nelson, Georgia, which charged $2.90 per stone. Camp Chase is listed on the National Register of Historic Places and is maintained by the Dayton National Cemetery.

Residents began holding an annual bean dinner near the cemetery in the 1930s to remember those who died in the war. This event continues today and takes place on the last Saturday in June. The Hilltop Historical Society also holds an annual memorial service at the cemetery on the second Sunday of June, including reenactment soldiers and characters from the period.

=== The Quaker Settlement ===
Shortly after the Civil War, members of the Short Creek Quarterly Meeting of the Quaker Church took an interest in the former camp land. Five Quaker men visited the site in 1870 to determine whether it met their needs. They found it suitable and returned to purchase it on January 23, 1872, at a cost of $87.50 per acre, covering a 463.5-acre plot. Some of the streets in Westgate today are named after early Quaker settlers.

== Building the neighborhood ==
In 1905, the land was sold to a real estate company, which subdivided it for housing. During the early 1920s, the former Camp Chase land was developed into a new subdivision called the Broadview Addition. The neighborhood was formally laid out in 1923, with the first six houses appearing on Binns Boulevard, and by 1924 the addition was well underway.

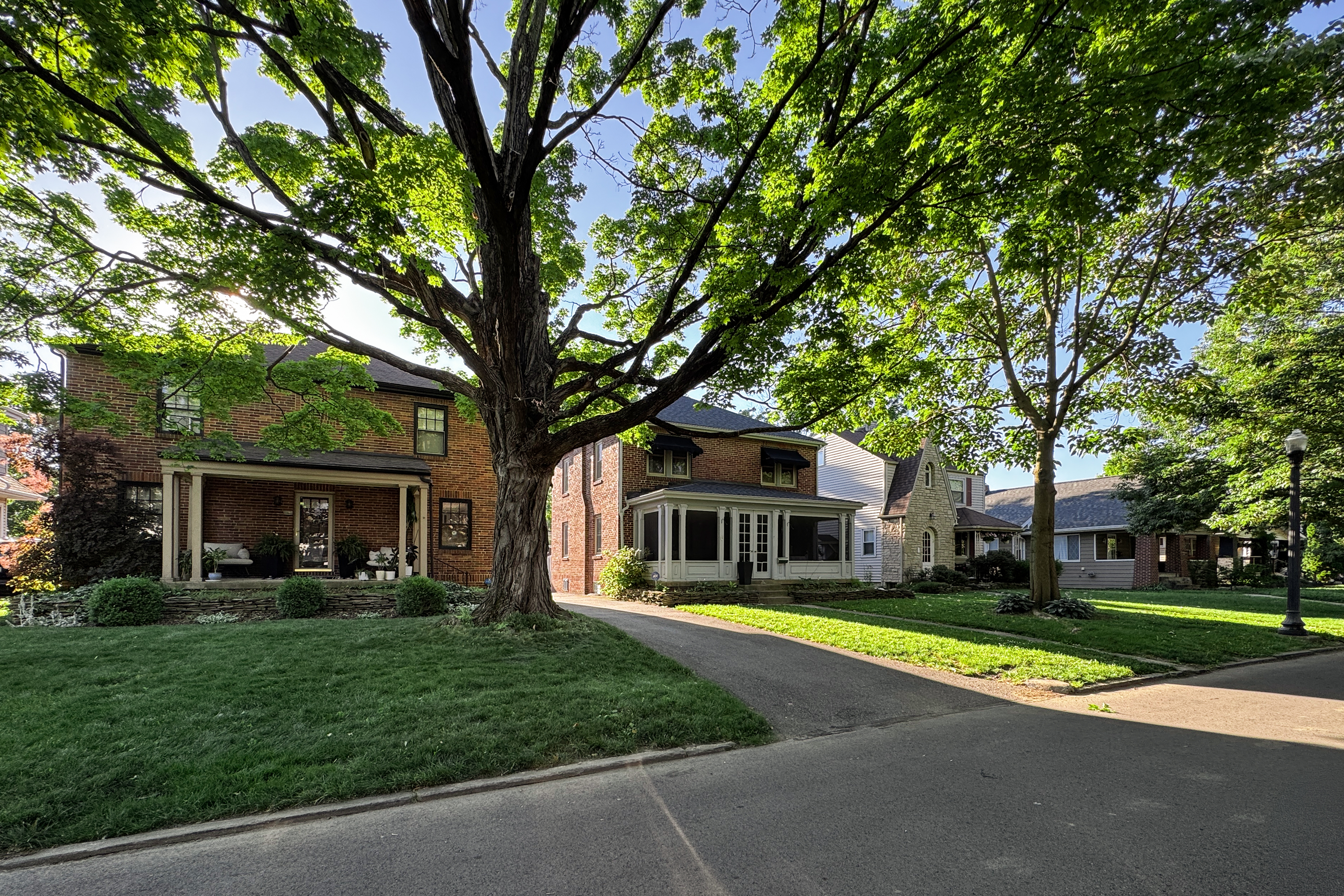
One of the many tree-lined streets in Westgate

During the 1920s, the neighborhood was served by the Camp Chase streetcar line, which gave residents easy access to downtown Columbus via West Broad Street and Sullivant Avenue. This made Westgate one of Columbus's early streetcar suburbs — neighborhoods that grew up around streetcar lines connecting them to the city center.

During the same period, adjacent farmland was subdivided for related developments: the former Vanderburg farm south of Sullivant Avenue became the Wilshire Heights subdivision, and the former Haldy and Scott farms north of West Broad Street became the North View subdivision.

=== Architecture and housing types ===
Westgate's housing stock spans four decades of residential construction, reflecting the neighborhood's development from the early 1920s through the 1960s. The earliest homes, built as part of the Broadview Addition during the 1920s, were predominantly custom-built rather than mass-produced, with residents selecting from a range of period styles including Cape Cods, bungalows, Tudor-style cottages, and Colonial Revival houses. Many drew on the Arts and Crafts and Romantic Revival movements popular in residential design of the period, resulting in a streetscape of varied façades, rooflines, and lot treatments uncommon in neighborhoods of comparable age elsewhere in Columbus.

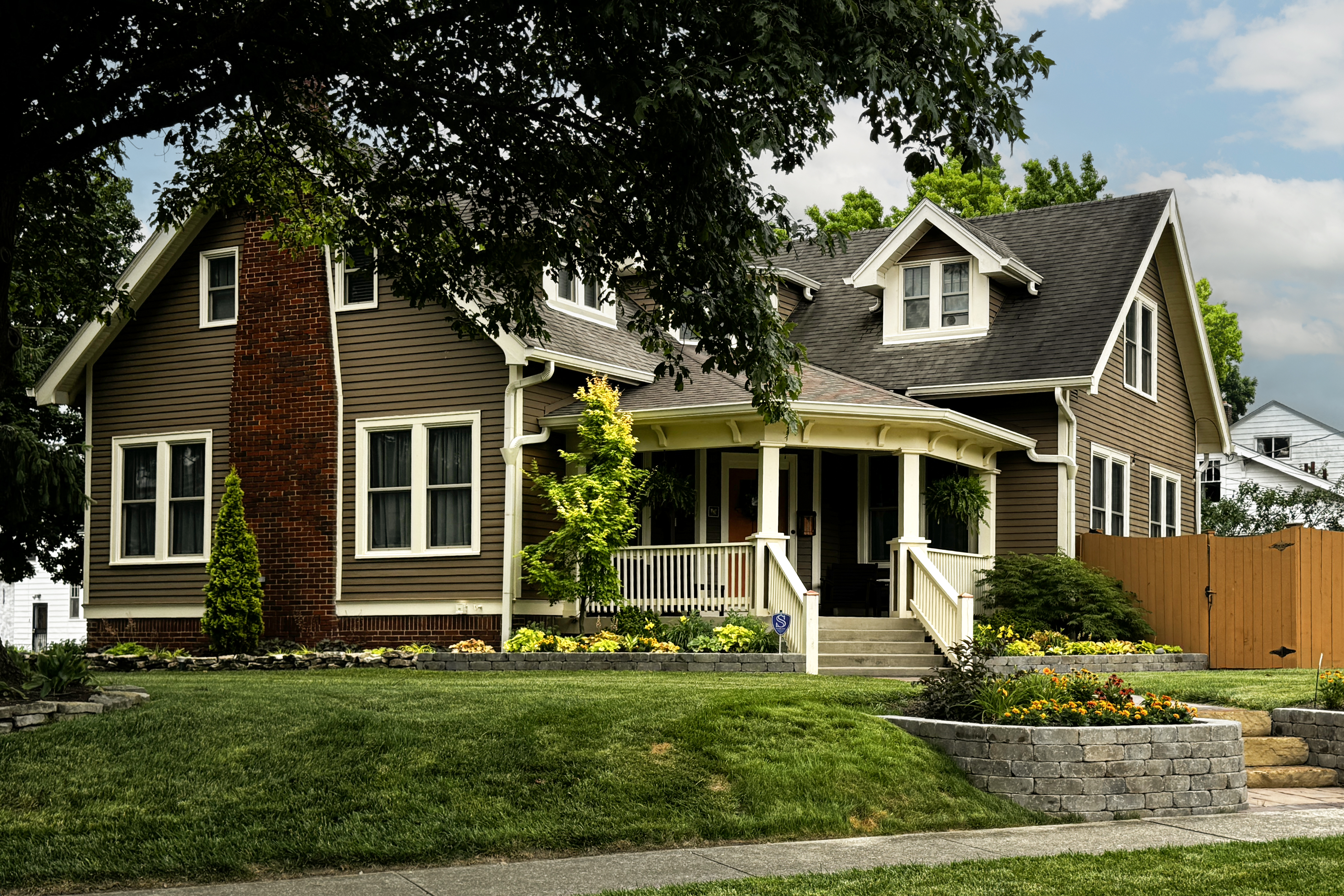
An American Craftsman/bungalow-style home in Westgate

Homes built during the 1930s and 1940s are typically one-and-a-half-story Cape Cod Revivals, characterized by side-gabled roofs, central chimneys, multipaned windows flanking a centered front door, and shed or gable dormers providing additional headroom upstairs. Stone or brick veneer fronts are common, often paired with wood-frame siding on the remaining elevations, with interiors that typically include three bedrooms, a full basement, and in many cases an original wood-burning fireplace. The area immediately surrounding Westgate Park — formerly the Hussey Estate — was developed later, with construction continuing through the 1940s, 1950s, and into the 1960s, adding Garrison Colonial Revival variants and early ranch-style homes to the neighborhood's housing stock.

Most homes throughout the neighborhood retain original interior details including hardwood floors, pocket doors, natural woodwork, and built-in cabinetry — features that real estate listings consistently cite as significant selling points for buyers seeking construction quality and character not typically found in newer development. As of late 2025, the median home sale price in Westgate was approximately $275,000, with homes typically selling within 45 days of listing.

== Recreation ==
=== Westgate Park ===
Westgate Park is a 46.3 acres (18.7 ha) city park at the center of the neighborhood. It features a fishing pond, a rain garden, playgrounds, picnic areas, an open shelter house, walking trails, a wooded area, and sports fields and courts for tennis, basketball, baseball, soccer, and football. The main walking path around the park is 1.2 miles (1.9 km) long.

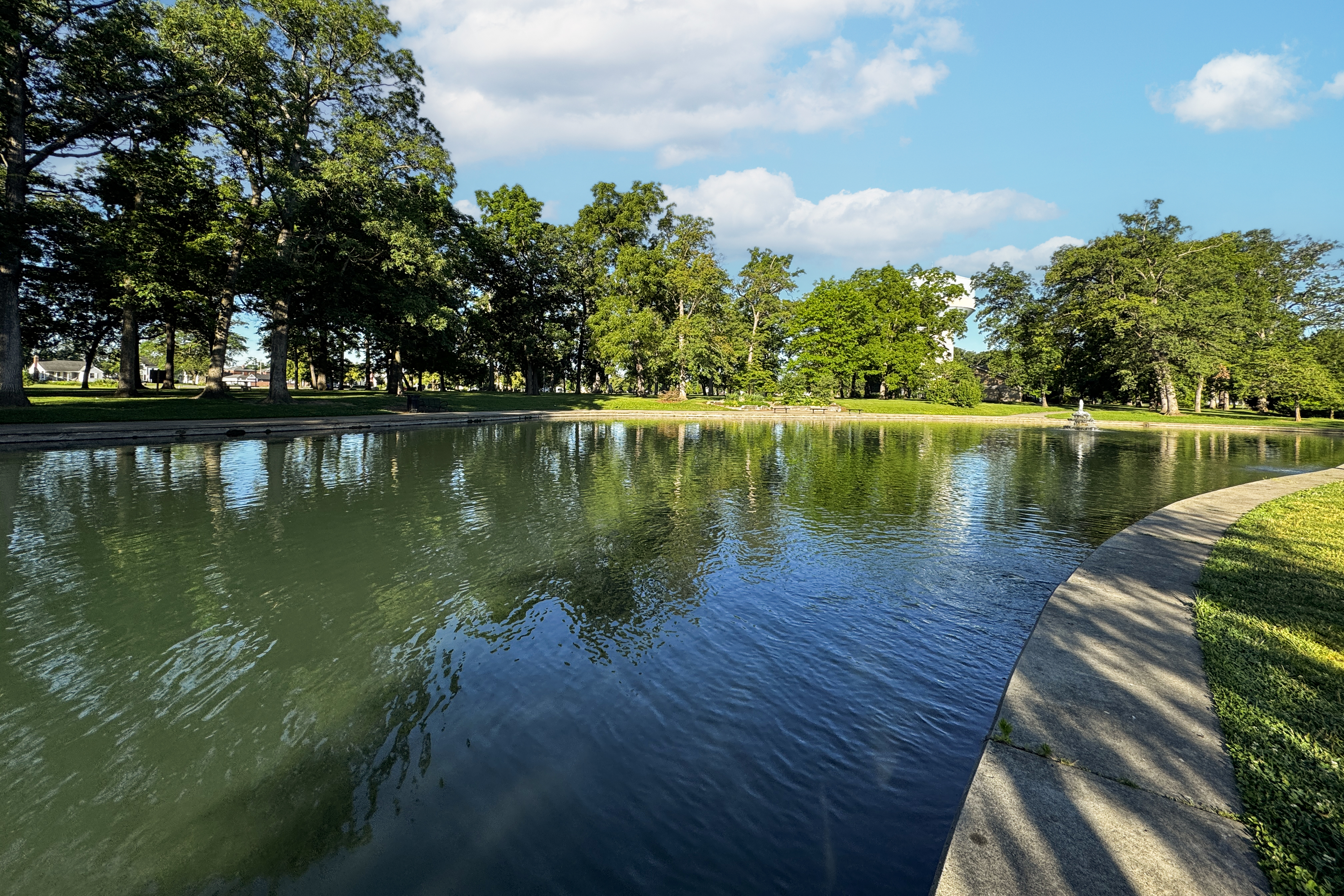
Harder Lake in Westgate Park

The park contains multiple playgrounds. Near the park entrance, a set of large letters spelling "ABC" has long served as a neighborhood landmark. The letter "B" was knocked over by a car in the 1980s and was replaced by the Westgate Neighbors Association in 2015.

The park's enclosed shelter house accommodates up to 180 people and is available for reservation through the City of Columbus Recreation and Parks Department.

=== Westgate Community Recreation Center ===
The Westgate Community Recreation Center offers a wide range of programming and facilities, including rooms for art, ceramics, dance, fitness, and crafts, as well as a gymnasium, auditorium, game room, gymnastics room, handball court, weight room, volleyball court, meeting rooms, lobby area, and kitchen.

== Schools ==
=== West High School ===
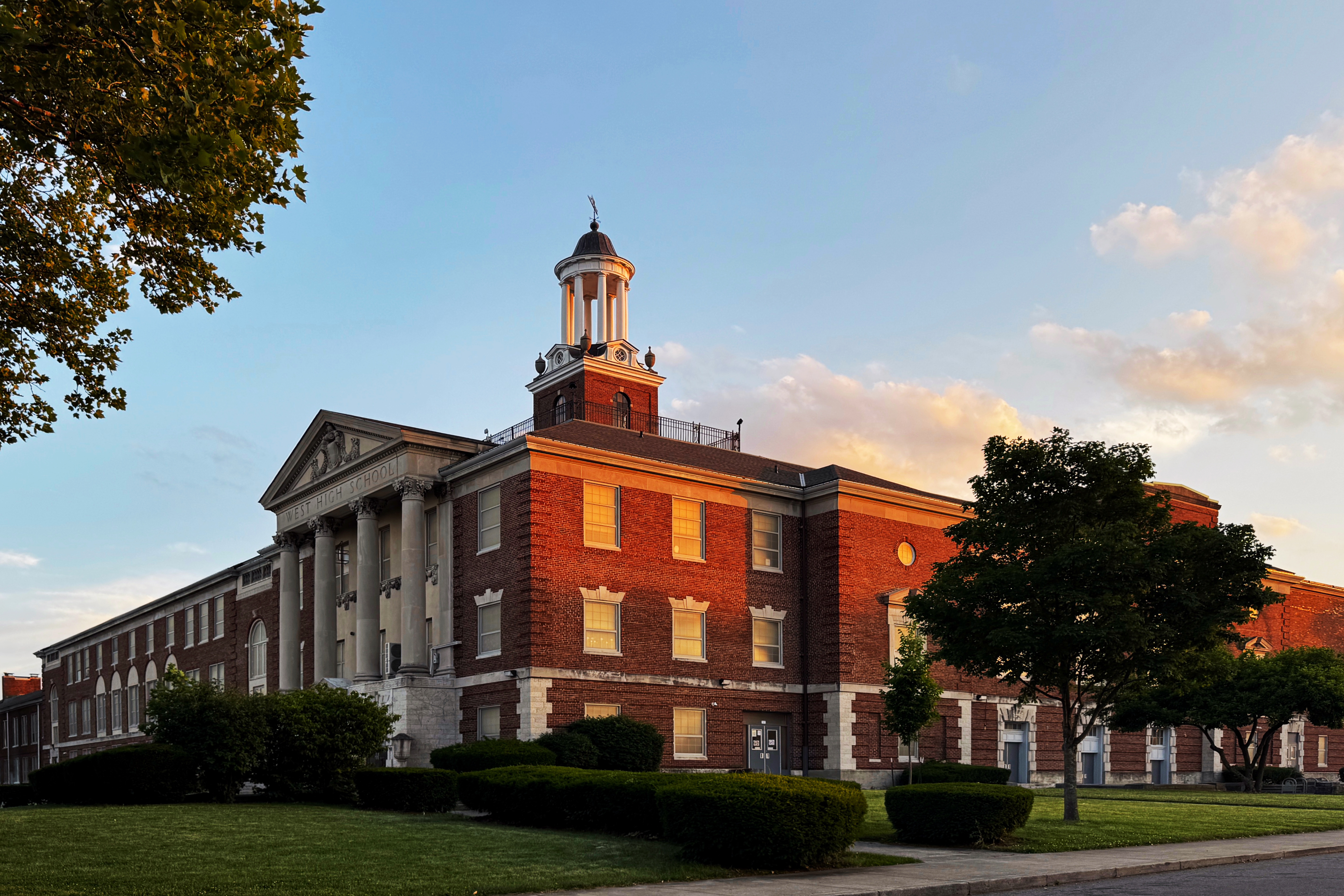
West High School

West High School is a public high school in Westgate, serving approximately 773 students in grades 9 through 12 as part of Columbus City Schools. Its mission statement reads: "Each student is highly educated, prepared for leadership and service, and empowered for success as a citizen in a global community." Its colors are buff and brown and its mascot is the cowboy. Columbus City Schools launched an Academies program at West and three other high schools, connecting students to career training, industry certifications, and college preparation through hands-on learning.

The building was constructed in 1929 and was designed by Ohio architect Howard Dwight Smith, who also designed Ohio Stadium at Ohio State University.

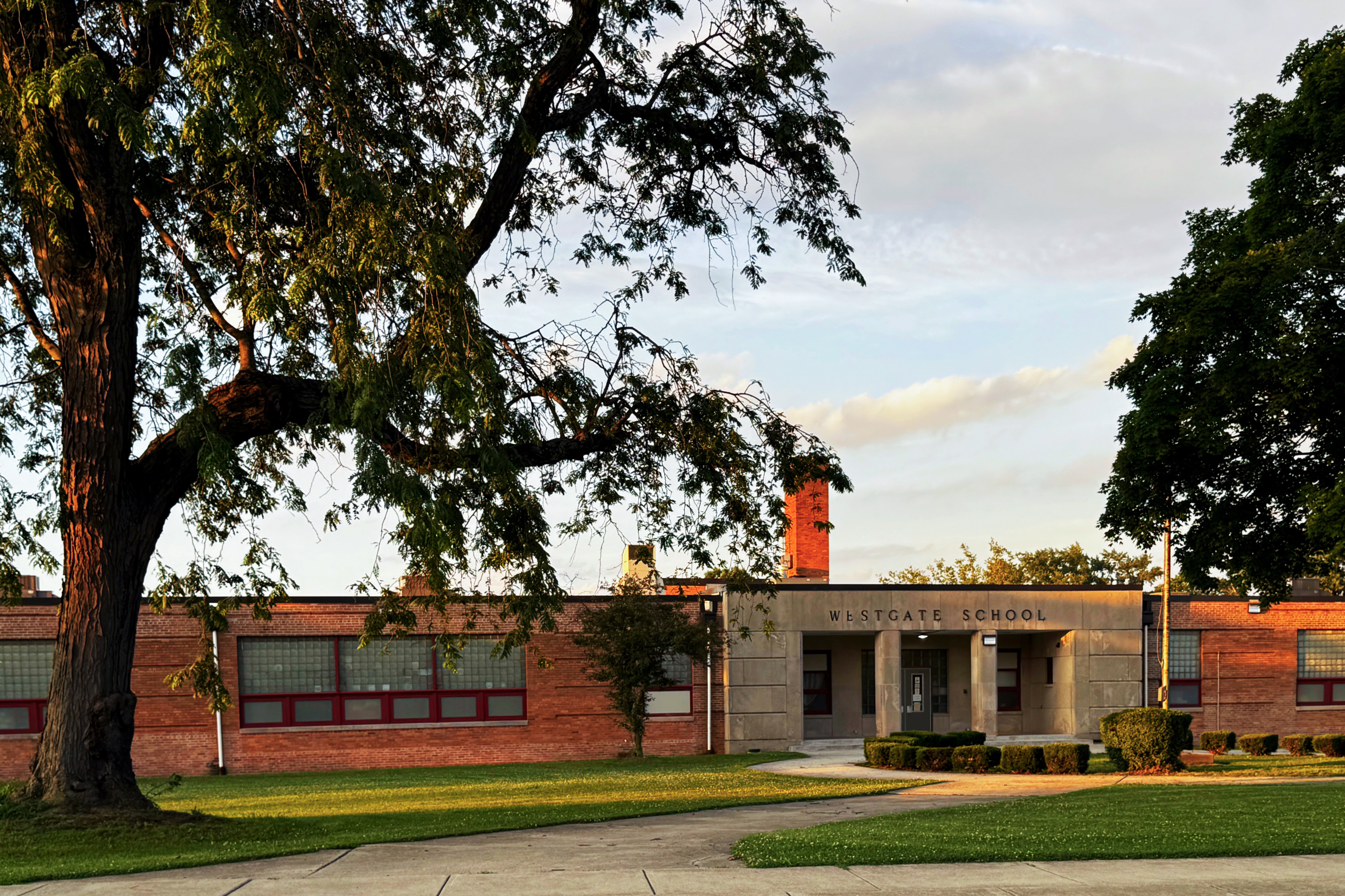
Westgate Elementary School

=== Westgate Elementary School ===
Westgate Elementary School is a public kindergarten-through-5th-grade elementary school, also located in Westgate. The school shares its mission statement with West High School. Its mascot is the gator.

=== Saint Mary Magdalene School ===
Saint Mary Magdalene School is a private Catholic school for students from kindergarten through 8th grade. It opened in 1928 and operates across six buildings on one campus. The school is accredited by the Ohio Catholic School Accreditation Association and the State of Ohio.

== Historic churches ==
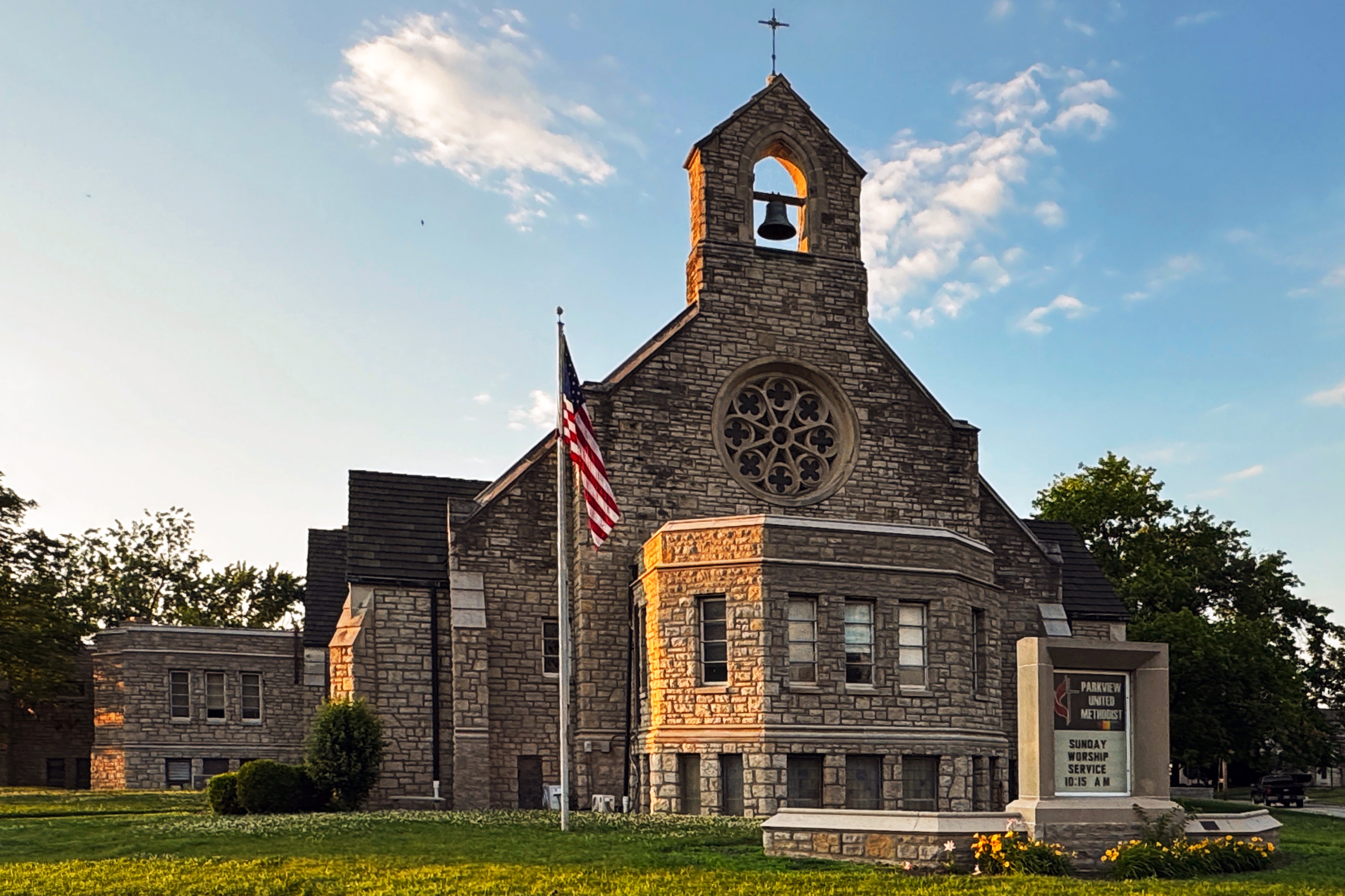
Parkview United Methodist Church

Westgate United Methodist Church is located at 61 South Powell Avenue, immediately north of West High School. Founded in 1927, the church has offered regular weekly services since its founding.

Parkview United Methodist Church is located at 344 S. Algonquin Avenue, just north of Westgate Park. The church played an important role in the original planning of the neighborhood, which can be seen in the multiple streets that converge around it and its prominent placement in relation to the park. It was constructed in 1941 and continues to hold weekly services.

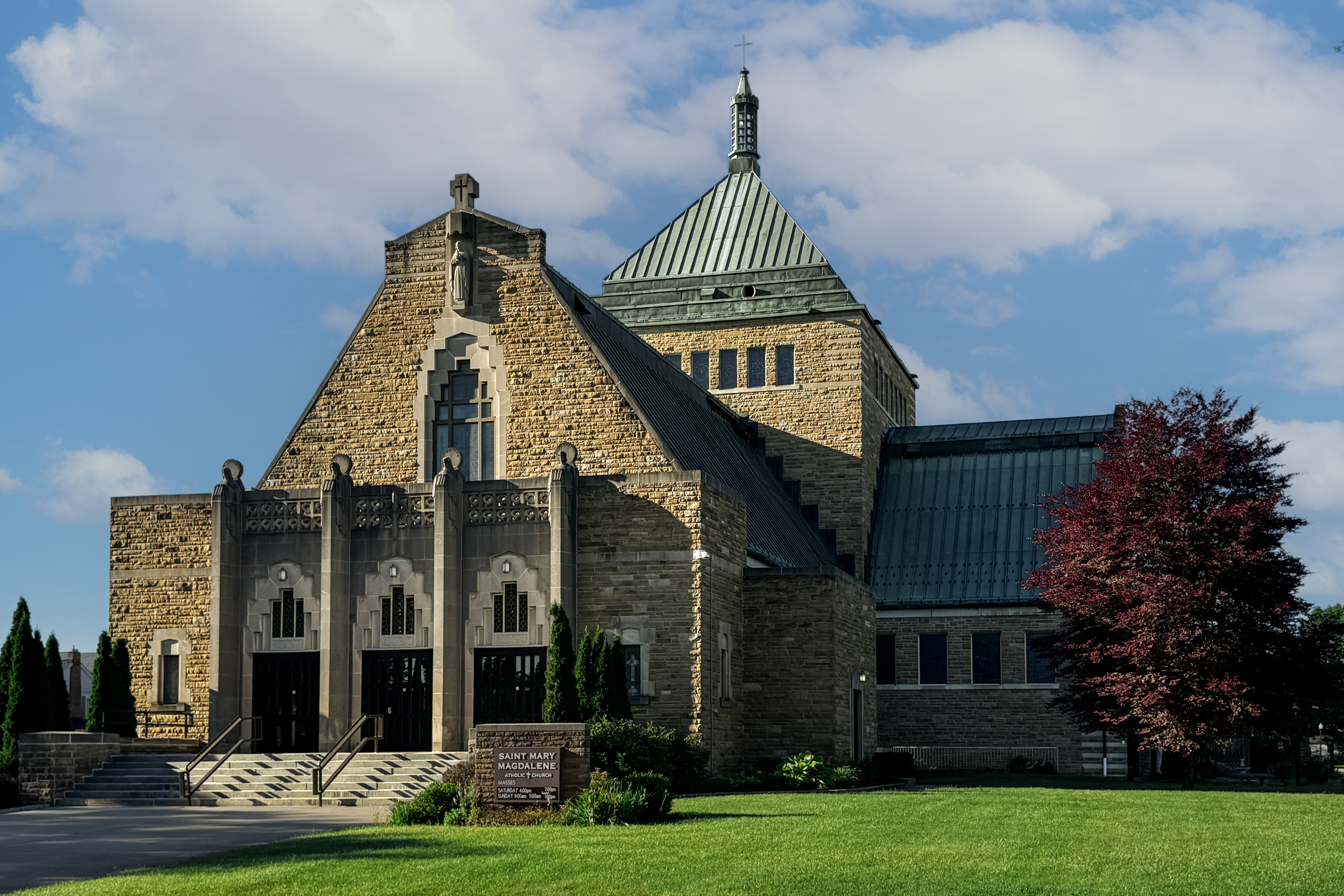
Saint Mary Magdalene Catholic Church

Saint Mary Magdalene Church continues to be an anchor of Catholic community life in Westgate.

== Community organizations ==
=== Westgate Neighbors Association ===
The Westgate Neighbors Association (WNA) is a 501(c)(3) nonprofit civic organization formed in February 2008. Its mission is to preserve, improve, and enhance the viability, livability, and overall quality of life for residents of Westgate. The WNA promotes community spirit among residents, businesses, and surrounding neighborhoods; works to restore and maintain the character and distinct qualities of the area; represents residents' interests before governmental bodies; and encourages the development of businesses that benefit the community. Membership is open to residents, business owners, and anyone else who wishes to contribute to the neighborhood's betterment and meetings are open to all.

The WNA connects neighbors to neighbors, publicizes the neighborhood, supports local businesses, and lobbies for improvements. It provides numerous activities and community service events, and works in partnership with Friends of Westgate Park. In 2025, the WNA hosted a celebration to commemorate the neighborhood's centennial. It included food, music and movies from the era, and historic items of importance to the neighborhood.

The WNA Scholarship was established in 2015 as an extension of the organization's mission to "help our community thrive." It awards an annual $1,000 postsecondary education scholarship, funded through proceeds from the Westgate Home and Garden Tour, to a Westgate resident or West High School student or alumnus pursuing an undergraduate degree or vocational certification. The award prioritizes demonstrated community service and leadership over academic performance alone.

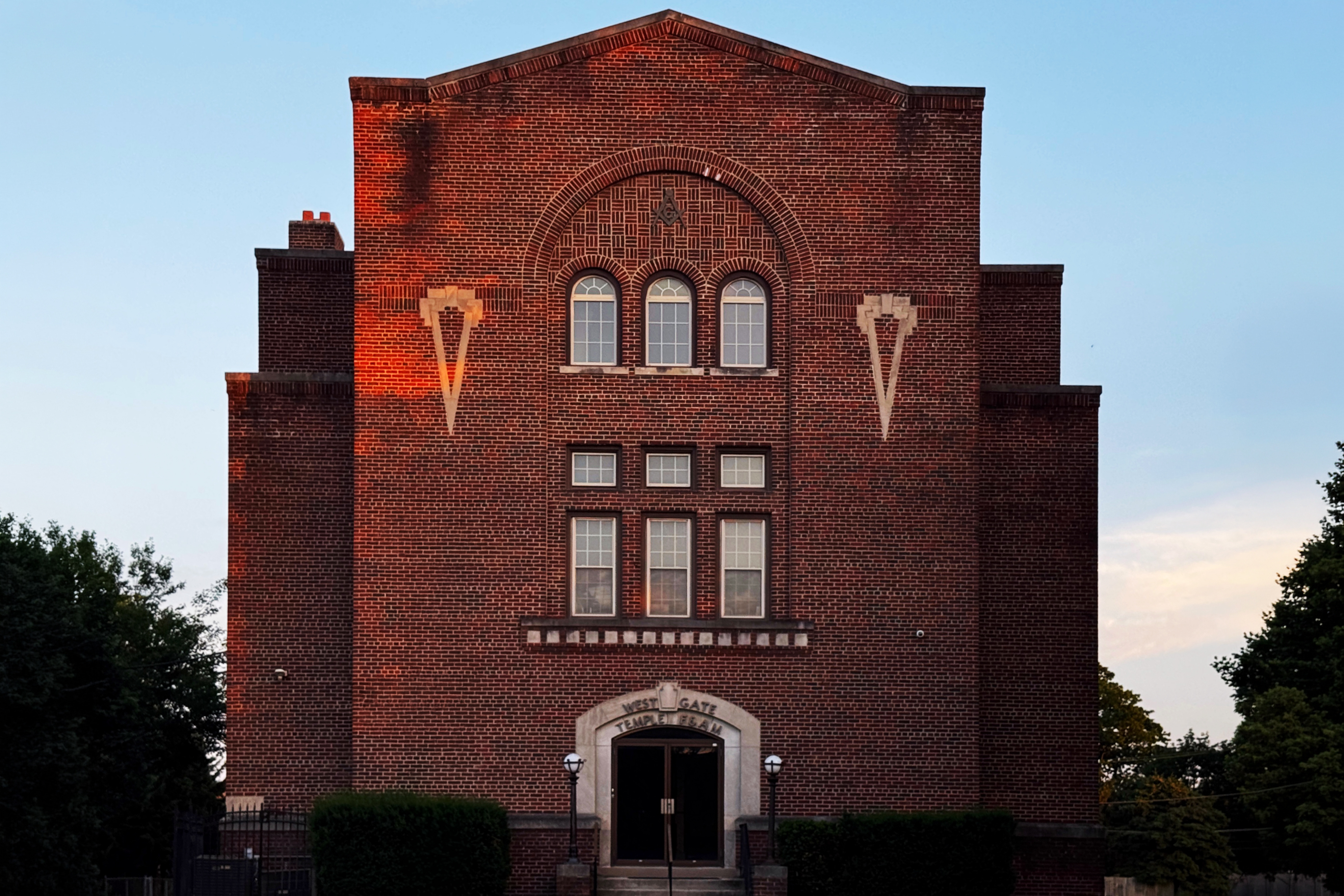
West-Gate Lodge No. 623 F&AM (Free & Accepted Masons)

=== Westgate Farmers Market ===
The Westgate Farmers Market runs on the first and third Saturdays from June through October at the West Gate Masonic Lodge at 2925 W. Broad St. It was established by residents to improve access to locally grown food on Columbus's west side.

=== Friends of Westgate Park ===
Friends of Westgate Park is an all-volunteer nonprofit organization dedicated to the maintenance and improvement of Westgate Park. Volunteers plant flowers and trees, pick up litter, and raise funds for park improvements.

== Notable residents and West High School alumni ==
=== Donn Eisele (1930–1987) ===
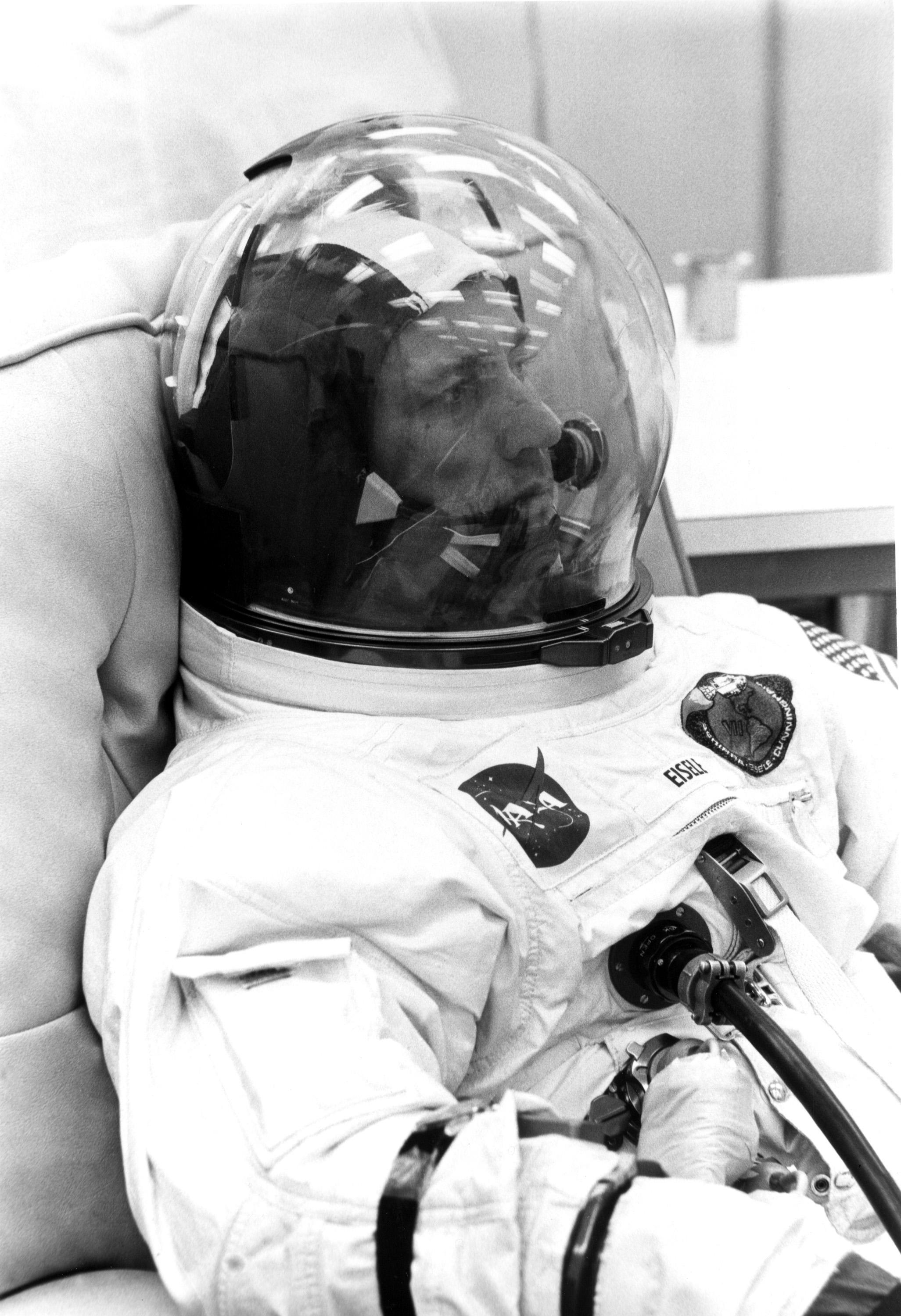
Donn Eisele, training for the Apollo 7 mission

Donn Fulton Eisele was a U.S. Air Force colonel and NASA astronaut who grew up in the Westgate neighborhood and graduated from West High School in 1948. He was born on June 23, 1930, in Columbus, Ohio. He received a Bachelor of Science degree from the U.S. Naval Academy in 1952 and chose a career in the Air Force, later earning a Master of Science degree in Astronautics from the Air Force Institute of Technology at Wright-Patterson Air Force Base in 1960. He subsequently became an experimental test pilot, logging more than 4,200 hours of flying time, of which 3,600 were in jet aircraft.

On October 11, 1968, Eisele flew as command module pilot on Apollo 7, the first crewed flight of the Apollo spacecraft, alongside Commander Wally Schirra and Lunar Module Pilot Walter Cunningham. The 263-hour, 4,500,000-mile mission splashed down in the Atlantic Ocean on October 22, 1968. It was the first Apollo mission to broadcast live television from space, and its success gave NASA the confidence to send Apollo 8 to lunar orbit. Over his career, Eisele personally logged 260 hours of spaceflight time.

=== Nancy Wilson (1937–2018) ===
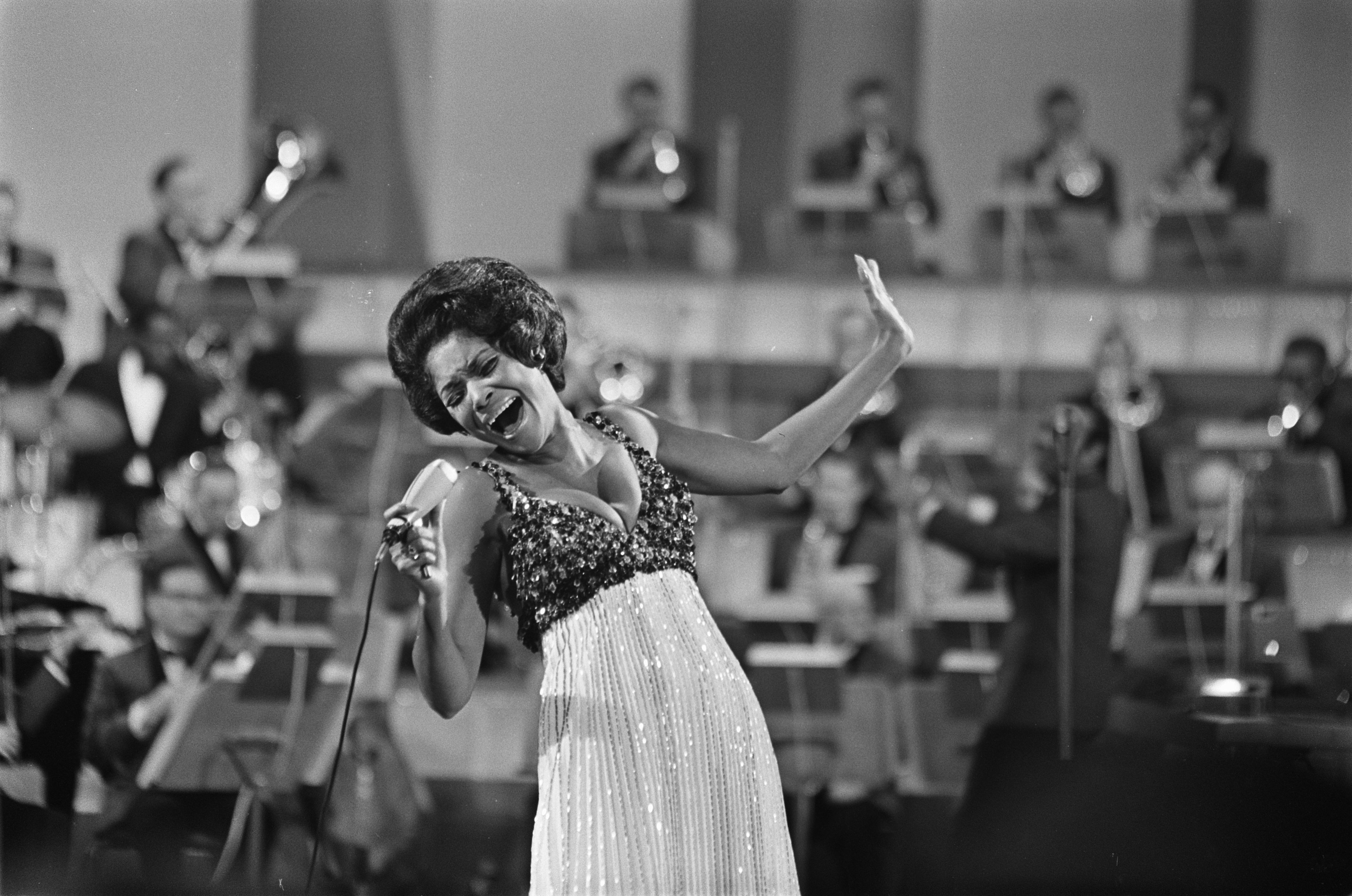
Nancy Wilson

Nancy Wilson was an American singer whose career in jazz, R&B, pop, and soul music spanned more than five decades. She was born on February 20, 1937, in Chillicothe, Ohio, and grew up in Columbus. While attending West High School, she won a talent contest at age 15 sponsored by the local ABC television station WTVN, earning a recurring role on a local program called Skyline Melodies, which she went on to host. She graduated in 1954 and briefly attended Central State University before leaving to pursue a singing career. She won three Grammy Awards: Best Rhythm and Blues Recording in 1964 for How Glad I Am — becoming the first artist to win that category — Best Jazz Vocal Album for R.S.V.P. (Rare Songs, Very Personal) at the 47th Grammy Awards in 2005, and Best Jazz Vocal Album again for Turned to Blue at the 49th Grammy Awards in 2007. At her peak, she was Capitol Records' second-best-selling act, behind only the Beatles. Wilson received an Emmy Award for her NBC television variety program The Nancy Wilson Show (1967–1968).

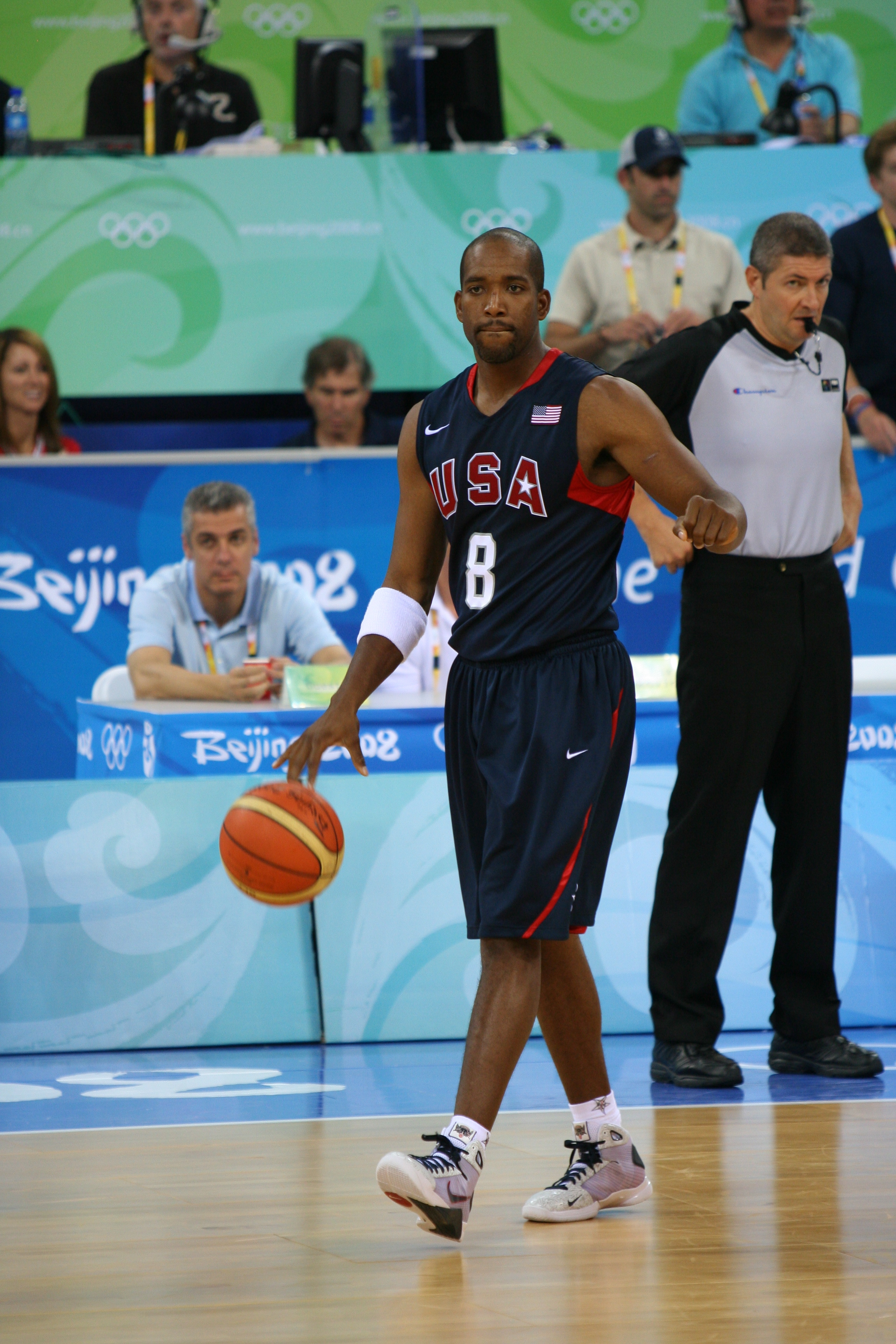
Michael Redd competing at the Beijing Olympics

=== Michael Redd (born 1979) ===
Michael Redd is a former professional NBA basketball player who grew up on the west side of Columbus and attended West High School, where he became one of the top high school players in Ohio. He was born on August 24, 1979, in Columbus. He played three seasons at Ohio State University, leading the Buckeyes to the NCAA Tournament Final Four in 1999 and earning Big Ten Freshman of the Year honors.

Redd was a member of the United States men's basketball team that won the gold medal at the 2008 Summer Olympics in Beijing. That team was inducted into the Naismith Memorial Basketball Hall of Fame as part of the Class of 2025. After retiring from professional basketball in 2013, Redd has remained active in business and philanthropy in Columbus.

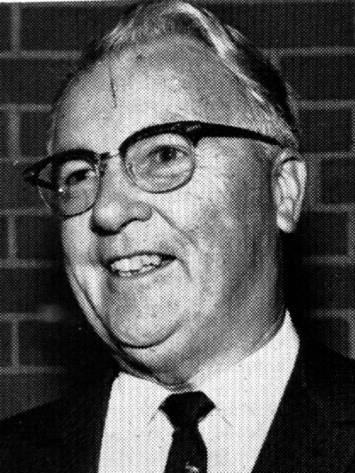
W. Ralston Westlake

=== W. Ralston Westlake (1907–1978) ===
Wallace Ralston Westlake, known throughout his life as "Ross," was a Republican politician who grew up on the Hilltop and graduated from West High School in 1925. He was born on August 27, 1907, in Columbus, Ohio, where his father, Milton Westlake, had served ten years as a Columbus City Councilman and eight years as a Franklin County Commissioner. As a young man, Westlake learned the art of ruby glass engraving from his father and went on to develop the process commercially as a glassware businessman.

Westlake served in the United States Army during World War II and was subsequently elected to Columbus City Council, where he served from 1955 to 1959 and served as President of City Council in 1959. He was elected the 47th Mayor of Columbus in 1959, serving from January 1, 1960, to January 1, 1964. His term in office was described as scandal-free, with city services increased and capital improvements made without raising taxes. He lost his bid for re-election in the 1963 mayoral election to former mayor Jack Sensenbrenner.

Throughout his life, Westlake maintained strong ties to the west side of Columbus, serving as President of the Hilltop Business Association and as a member of the West Gate Masonic Lodge. He died on December 9, 1978, at the age of 71, and is buried at Green Lawn Cemetery in Columbus.

== See Also ==
- The Hilltop, Columbus, Ohio
- Camp Chase
- Columbus City Schools
- Franklinton, Columbus, Ohio
- West High School (Columbus, Ohio)
