= West High School (Columbus, Ohio) =

Public high school in Columbus, Ohio

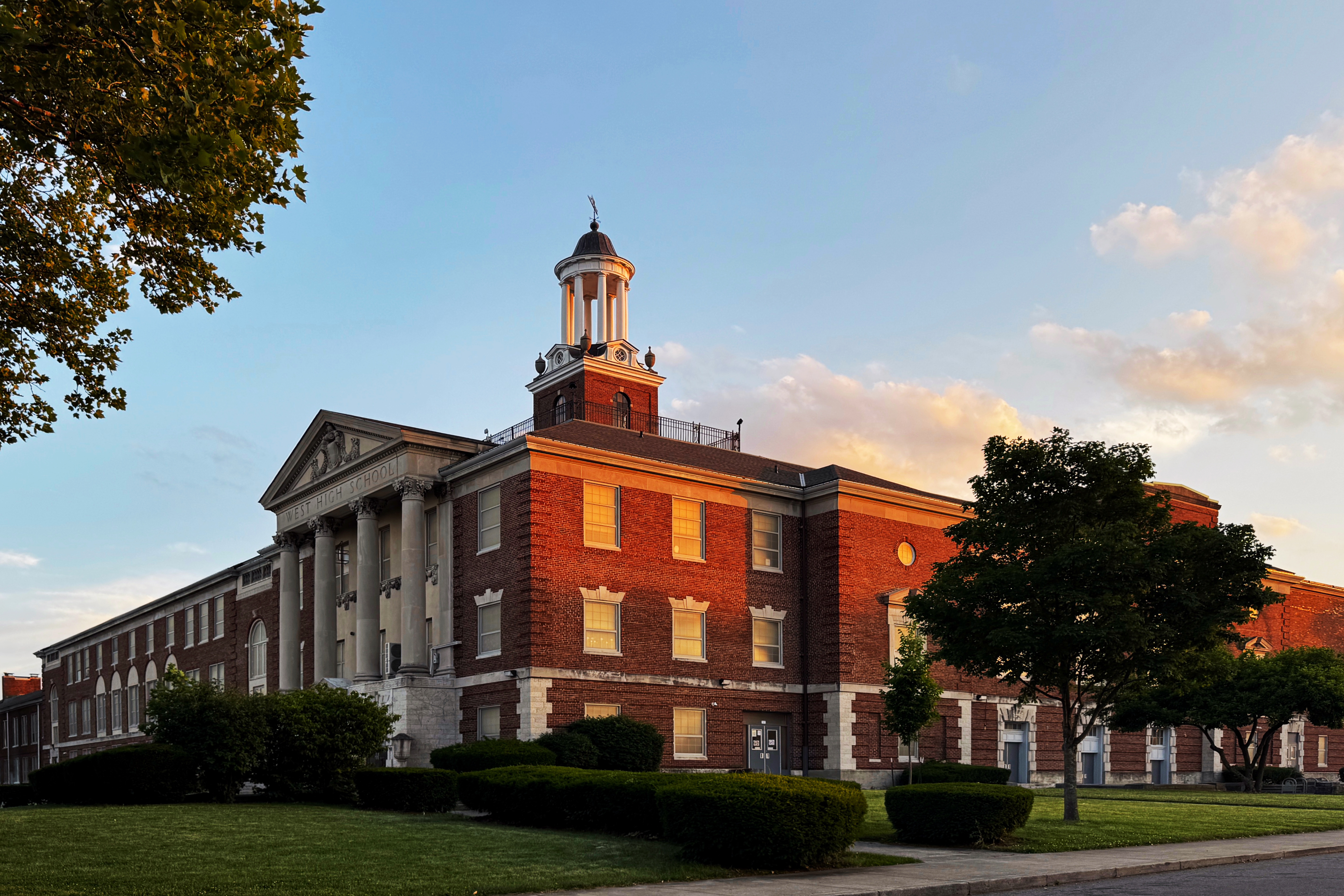
- West High School, 179 South Powell Avenue, Columbus, Ohio

Location
- 179 South Powell Avenue; Columbus, Ohio 43204; United States; 39°57′6″N 83°4′33″W

Information
- Type: Public high school
- Established: 1909
- School district: Columbus City Schools
- Superintendent: Angela Chapman
- Principal: Daniel Roberts
- Grades: 9–12
- Enrollment: 837 (2022–2023)
- Student to teacher ratio: 15.79
- Colors: Buff and brown
- Nickname: Cowboys
- Accreditation: North Central Association of Colleges and Schools
- Website: wesths.ccsoh.us

West High School is a public high school located at 179 South Powell Avenue on the west side of Columbus, Ohio, in the Westgate neighborhood of The Hilltop. It is part of Columbus City Schools and serves students in grades 9 through 12. The school's athletic teams compete as the Cowboys, and its colors are buff and brown. The current building, designed by architect Howard Dwight Smith and opened in 1929, occupies ground that was once part of Camp Chase, a Union Army training and prisoner-of-war camp during the American Civil War. West High School has served the west side of Columbus for more than a century and has produced graduates who have distinguished themselves in music, professional athletics, military service, space exploration, and journalism.

== History ==
=== Origins and the west side of Columbus ===
West High School traces its origins to the growth of Columbus's west side during the final decades of the nineteenth century. As the city expanded westward along the National Road — now West Broad Street — the population of The Hilltop and its surrounding neighborhoods increased steadily, placing pressure on the Columbus City Schools district to establish new educational facilities on that side of the city.

The immediate cause of the school's creation was overcrowding at Central High School during the 1890s. As enrollment at Central outpaced the building's capacity, a portion of students was separated and relocated to a secondary location, establishing the foundation for what would become three new schools, including West High School. West High was one of a set of cardinal-direction high schools — along with East, North, South, and Central — that Columbus established to serve distinct geographic quadrants of the growing city.

=== First building (1908–1929) ===
Construction of the first dedicated West High School building began in the summer of 1907 on a site at the corner of South Central Avenue and Town Street. The building was designed by David Riebel (August 7, 1855 – July 29, 1935), a German-American architect who became the first head of the architectural department of the Columbus Board of Education in 1893 and served in that role until 1922, designing approximately forty Columbus public school buildings during his tenure. His firm, David Riebel & Sons, was described by The Ohio Architect, Engineer and Builder in 1915 as among the oldest and most respected architectural practices in Columbus.

The building was constructed in the Neo-Classical Revival style and opened on September 8, 1908, at 120 South Central Avenue, with formal dedication following in March 1909. The school's yearbook, issued annually from the earliest years of its operation, was titled The Occident — a reference to the west, consistent with the school's geographic identity on the western side of Columbus. By 1916, the school enrolled 457 pupils and employed 19 teachers under principal Otto H. Magly and vice-principal Augusta Connolley.

When the new West High School building opened in 1929, the original South Central Avenue structure was converted for use as Starling Junior High School. Starling Junior High School closed in 2012.

=== The 1929 building and the Camp Chase site ===
Construction of the present building began on June 6, 1927, at 179 South Powell Avenue. The building opened in 1929 and has remained in continuous operation at that location.

The land on which the school stands carries historical significance predating the school itself. Camp Chase was a Union Army training and prisoner of war camp established in May 1861, four miles west of downtown Columbus, on land leased by the federal government. Named for Salmon P. Chase — then Secretary of the Treasury under President Abraham Lincoln and a former Governor of Ohio — the camp served as a training ground for Ohio volunteer soldiers, a parole camp, a muster-out post, and eventually a large prisoner-of-war facility. Its boundaries corresponded to present-day Broad Street to the north, Hague Avenue to the east, Sullivant Avenue to the south, and Westgate Avenue to the west. Approximately 150,000 Union soldiers trained there and approximately 25,000 Confederate prisoners passed through it between 1861 and 1865, with more than 2,200 dying in captivity. After the camp closed in 1865, its structures were gradually dismantled and the land passed into private hands. The Camp Chase Confederate Cemetery, located at 2900 Sullivant Avenue, is the only surviving physical remnant of the camp and contains 2,260 graves. The Westgate neighborhood, including the Powell Avenue school grounds, was developed on former camp land beginning in the 1920s, when the area was built out as a streetcar suburb.

=== Subsequent development and the grade restructuring ===
In 1953, a third-floor addition to the northwest wing of the building was completed, expanding the school's capacity. Subsequent renovations added a two-story wing containing a library learning center, a vocational business education unit, a guidance suite, and dedicated space for the instrumental music program.

From 1966 until 1980, West High School served only tenth through twelfth grade students, as Columbus converted its junior high schools to middle schools serving grades six through eight and separated the ninth grade into its own tier. In the fall of 1980, when the district completed its restructuring of the middle school model, the ninth grade was returned to the high schools and West High resumed serving all four high school grade levels.

In 1979, one year before the ninth grade returned, Columbus City Schools received students from outside West High's traditional attendance area under a federal court order for desegregation, substantially altering the school's enrollment composition. The effects of that order on the school and district are addressed in the Desegregation section below.

== Architecture ==
=== Howard Dwight Smith and the design of the building ===
The present West High School building was designed by Howard Dwight Smith (February 21, 1886 – April 27, 1958), one of the most consequential architects in the history of central Ohio. Smith was born in Dayton, Ohio, and graduated from The Ohio State University in 1907 with a degree in civil engineering. He subsequently earned a Bachelor of Architecture from Columbia University in 1910 and received a Perkins Traveling Fellowship in 1911, which funded ten months of architectural study in Europe, principally in Italy. The classical monuments he studied during that fellowship, particularly the Pantheon and the Colosseum in Rome, left a lasting impression on his design philosophy that would be visible in his most prominent subsequent projects.

After his return from Europe, Smith joined the New York firm of John Russell Pope, one of the foremost architects of the Beaux-Arts tradition in America, where he served as chief designer and worked on the Vanderbilt mansion on Long Island and the Henry Clay Frick residence on Fifth Avenue. Around 1917, he was persuaded to return to Columbus to design a new football stadium for The Ohio State University. Ohio Stadium, completed in 1922, was at its opening the largest two-level, open-ended stadium in the world, and its horseshoe form — inspired by Smith's study of the Roman Colosseum — became one of the most recognized sports venues in the United States. In 1921, Smith received the American Institute of Architects Gold Medal for Public Building Design for Ohio Stadium.

Smith served as chief architect for the Columbus Board of Education from 1921 to 1929, during which time he designed West High School along with approximately twenty-five other schools across central Ohio. West High School and Columbus City Hall stand among the most prominent examples of his civic work outside the Ohio State campus. He then returned to Ohio State as University Architect, a position he held from 1929 to 1956, during which he designed or oversaw more than thirty campus buildings, including St. John Arena, the Thompson Library stack tower, and numerous dormitories and academic facilities. Smith died on April 27, 1958, and is buried at Green Lawn Cemetery in Columbus.

=== The building ===
West High School reflects the neoclassical design principles Smith developed through his European study and refined in his work on Ohio Stadium. The building presents a formal, symmetrical brick facade with classical detailing consistent with Smith's approach to public civic architecture. Its scale and permanence were deliberate: Smith believed, as his granddaughter later recalled, that no matter one's circumstances, everyone deserves a well-built, beautifully designed place to work and learn.

The interior retains notable period features, including small murals in the auditorium, some depicting airships, that reflect the design sensibilities of the era in which the building was constructed. The main administrative office is situated on the second floor, an arrangement preserved from the original design. The building has been recognized among the most architecturally distinguished high schools in central Ohio.

=== The cupola ===
A defining exterior feature is the building's cupola, which raises West High School to 90 feet — the tallest structure on the west side of Columbus. Atop the cupola sits a weathervane in the form of pioneers traveling in a covered wagon, a deliberate reference to the school's Cowboys nickname and to the history of westward settlement associated with The Hilltop and the National Road corridor.

In August 2016, the original cupola, which had stood for nearly ninety years, was declared structurally unsafe and removed. Its absence was felt acutely by alumni and community members alike; one alumnus compared the feeling to the theft of the Confederate soldier statue atop the nearby Camp Chase Confederate Cemetery memorial, which had left that monument seeming incomplete. The Columbus City Schools Board of Education approved approximately $343,000 for a replacement, and a new cupola — identical in appearance to the original but constructed of lighter, weather-resistant materials — was installed in 2018. The new cupola weighs 75 pounds less than the original and is built to withstand Ohio's weather conditions more durably. A lighting ceremony held on April 10, 2018, drew alumni, students, school board members, and community members to celebrate the restoration. Board of Education President Gary Baker, a former Hilltop resident, stated at the ceremony that the cupola was critical to the fabric and identity of The Hilltop community, and Columbus City Schools Interim Superintendent John Stanford pledged continued investment in both the building and its students.

== Desegregation ==
West High School and Columbus City Schools occupied a central position in one of the most consequential school desegregation cases in American legal history. The litigation arose from conditions that had developed over decades. In 1976, at the time of trial, roughly 70 percent of the district's approximately 96,000 students attended schools that were at least 80 percent white or 80 percent black, and half of the district's 172 schools were 90 percent or more racially homogeneous.

In 1973, fourteen minority students filed a class action suit in federal court in Columbus, charging that the Columbus Board of Education had pursued policies that intentionally caused and perpetuated racial segregation throughout the district. The case was tried over thirty-six days in 1976, producing a record of more than 6,600 transcript pages and over 600 exhibits.

In March 1977, U.S. District Judge Robert M. Duncan ruled in Penick v. Columbus Board of Education that the district had knowingly maintained a dual school system in violation of the Fourteenth Amendment. The court found that racial segregation in Columbus schools had directly resulted from the board's intentional acts and omissions, including the manipulation of attendance zone boundaries, discriminatory school site selection, and the segregated assignment of teachers and administrators. The court found, for instance, that on the west side of the city, attendance zone lines had been drawn to contain Black students within certain schools while allowing white students to attend separate facilities.

The Columbus Board of Education appealed through the United States Court of Appeals for the Sixth Circuit, which upheld Judge Duncan's findings. The board petitioned the Supreme Court, and Justice William Rehnquist granted a temporary stay of the busing order before the start of the 1978–1979 school year. On July 2, 1979, the Supreme Court of the United States affirmed in a 7–2 decision in Columbus Board of Education v. Penick, 443 U.S. 449 (1979), that the board bore a continuing constitutional obligation to disestablish its segregated system and that a districtwide busing remedy was warranted. The decision was handed down the same day as the companion case Dayton Board of Education v. Brinkman, and together the two Ohio decisions became significant precedents in Northern school desegregation law, affirming that intentional acts by northern school boards could establish de jure segregation even absent a history of legal mandates.

Court-ordered busing began on September 6, 1979, when approximately 35,000 Columbus City Schools students boarded buses, making Columbus one of the first major American cities to implement a districtwide mandatory desegregation plan. West High School, which had drawn its enrollment primarily from the Hilltop and Westgate neighborhoods, received students from other parts of the city under the plan. The experience was significant for the school's composition and identity; as one alumna later wrote, the student population came to reflect more cultures and ethnicities than those who designed the original 1979 plan had likely imagined.

The busing program substantially reshaped enrollment patterns across the district. Many families relocated to suburban school districts to avoid the mandate, and overall Columbus City Schools enrollment — which had peaked at 110,725 students in 1971 — declined sharply in the years that followed. Two high schools, North High School and Central High School, closed in 1979 and 1982 respectively as a direct result of falling enrollment. Court supervision of the Columbus schools continued until busing formally ended in 1996. Today, West High School's student population reflects the demographic diversity of The Hilltop, which includes significant Somali and Latino communities, as well as long-established families with multigenerational ties to the school.

== Academics ==
West High School operates as a STEM-focused learning community within Columbus City Schools, offering a curriculum designed to prepare students for both post-secondary education and careers in technical fields. The school participates in the Project Lead the Way engineering curriculum, providing multiple courses in engineering design and technology that follow the national PLTW sequence. Students have access to free dual enrollment courses through a formal partnership with Columbus State Community College, allowing them to earn college credit while still enrolled in high school. Advanced Placement coursework is available across core academic subject areas.

The school has been recognized by the Ohio STEM Learning Network for its commitment to project-based instruction that integrates career exploration, job shadowing, internships, and real-world applications into the academic program. The school also offers a Gifted and Talented program.

== Athletics ==
West High School competes in the Columbus City League in a range of varsity sports. Sports offered include football, basketball, baseball, softball, volleyball, soccer, golf, tennis, cross country, wrestling, and track and field. The school's teams are known as the Cowboys.

In football, West High School qualified for the Ohio High School Athletic Association state playoffs in 2016 and 2020. In baseball, Columbus West appeared in the OHSAA state tournament in 1975.

The school has produced athletes whose careers extended well beyond Columbus. Johnny Edwards, a West High graduate, played fourteen seasons in Major League Baseball as a catcher for the Cincinnati Reds, St. Louis Cardinals, and Houston Astros, was named to three All-Star Games, and won two Gold Glove Awards for his defensive excellence. Edwards went on to earn a degree in engineering from The Ohio State University and worked during his off-seasons as a research engineer for General Electric's nuclear materials operation. Michael Redd, who graduated from West High in 1997, played twelve NBA seasons primarily with the Milwaukee Bucks, was named an NBA All-Star in 2004, scored a career-high 57 points in a single game against the Utah Jazz in November 2006, and won a gold medal as a member of the United States men's basketball team at the 2008 Summer Olympics in Beijing. The West High basketball program during Redd's tenure reached three state championship game appearances. In 2025, Redd was inducted into the Naismith Memorial Basketball Hall of Fame as a member of the 2008 U.S. Olympic team.

== Band and music ==
West High School has maintained a music program spanning marching band, concert band, jazz ensemble, orchestra, and choir throughout much of its history. The program has produced recordings across multiple decades that the West High School Alumni Association preserves in a publicly accessible archive, including performances of orchestral and ensemble works, drum cadences, and choral pieces dating to the early 1970s.

The marching band's most noted historical achievement was its participation in Rose Bowl-related events in Pasadena, California, in 1969, an appearance documented in the school's alumni records. The school's fight song, Hail the Cowboys, remains part of the band's repertoire and is preserved in the alumni archive alongside recordings of signature cadences and ensemble works.

The most celebrated musician in West High School's history is Nancy Wilson, who attended the school in the early 1950s. At the age of 15, while still a student, Wilson won a talent contest sponsored by Columbus television station WTVN, with the prize being her own twice-weekly television program, Skyline Melodies, on which she performed phoned-in requests. She graduated from West High School in 1954 and went on to record more than 70 albums, win three Grammy Awards, and receive a star on the Hollywood Walk of Fame. Wilson's early musical development — singing in church choirs, performing in Columbus clubs beginning at age 15, and hosting her own television program before graduating — was shaped substantially by her years at West High School.

== Notable alumni ==
- Richard E. Carey (class of 1945; January 10, 1928 – April 25, 2025), United States Marine Corps Lieutenant General who commanded the 9th Marine Amphibious Brigade and directed Operation Frequent Wind, the 1975 helicopter evacuation of Saigon that extracted approximately 6,000 people by air and 40,000 by sea. Carey served in combat in both the Korean War and the Vietnam War, participating in the Battle of Inchon and the Battle of Chosin Reservoir, where he earned the Silver Star for his leadership before being wounded and evacuated. During the Vietnam War he flew 204 combat sorties in the F-4 Phantom and earned the Distinguished Flying Cross. Carey received 28 personal decorations over a 38-year career and retired from the Marine Corps in 1983. He died on April 25, 2025, at the age of 97.
- Lawrence Carter (class of 1960), historian, professor, and civil rights scholar who serves as Dean of the Martin Luther King Jr. International Chapel at Morehouse College and founded the Martin Luther King Jr. Chapel Assistants Pre-seminarians Program there in 1979. Carter was raised on The Hilltop and graduated from West High School before earning his Ph.D. in pastoral psychology and counseling from Boston University. He has been a National Endowment for the Humanities Fellow twice and a Fulbright Scholar.
- Johnny Edwards (class of 1956; born June 10, 1938), professional baseball catcher who played in Major League Baseball from 1961 to 1974 for the Cincinnati Reds, St. Louis Cardinals, and Houston Astros. Edwards was a three-time All-Star and a two-time Gold Glove Award winner, recognized by the Society for American Baseball Research as among the most dominant defensive catchers in major league history. In 1969 with the Houston Astros he set a then-major league record for putouts by a catcher in a single season with 1,135. He earned an engineering degree from The Ohio State University and worked during his off-seasons as a research engineer for General Electric.
- Donn F. Eisele (class of 1948; June 23, 1930 – December 2, 1987), NASA astronaut and United States Air Force colonel who served as command module pilot on Apollo 7 in October 1968, the first crewed flight test of the Apollo spacecraft. Eisele was selected in NASA's third astronaut group in October 1963 and logged 260 hours in space during the eleven-day mission. During high school, Eisele competed in track and cross country and earned the rank of Eagle Scout. After his return from space, he appeared on the front steps of West High School during the school's homecoming to receive recognition from students and faculty. He was inducted into the United States Astronaut Hall of Fame in 1997.
- Joe Johns (class of 1975), journalist and CNN Senior Washington Correspondent. Johns was a star discus thrower at West High School, winning the 1975 Class AAA state championship in the discus, and later earned a four-year track and field scholarship to Marshall University. He joined CNN in 2004 and has covered Capitol Hill, the Supreme Court, and multiple presidential administrations. He has received two National Association of Black Journalists Salute to Excellence awards and contributed to Emmy Award-winning coverage.
- Michael Redd (class of 1997; born August 24, 1979), professional basketball player who spent twelve seasons in the National Basketball Association, primarily with the Milwaukee Bucks, where he became the franchise's leading figure after signing a six-year, $91 million contract extension in 2005. Redd averaged 19.0 points per game over his NBA career and once held the NBA record for three-point field goals made in a single quarter. After his retirement in 2013, Redd became an active venture capital investor, founding the investment firm 22 Ventures. In 2025, he was inducted into the Naismith Memorial Basketball Hall of Fame as a member of the gold medal-winning 2008 U.S. Olympic team.
- Nancy Wilson (class of 1954; February 20, 1937 – December 13, 2018), jazz and popular vocalist whose career spanned more than five decades. Wilson recorded more than 70 albums and won three Grammy Awards: for How Glad I Am (1964), R.S.V.P. (Rare Songs, Very Personal) (2005), and Turned to Blue (2007). She hosted NPR's Jazz Profiles from 1996 to 2005 and received the George Foster Peabody Award in 2001. At the age of 15, while a student at West High School, Wilson won a local television talent contest sponsored by station WTVN and was awarded her own program, Skyline Melodies, which she hosted while still in school. She received a star on the Hollywood Walk of Fame in 1990 and was named an NEA Jazz Master by the National Endowment for the Arts in 2004 — the highest honor the United States government confers on jazz musicians.

== Sources ==
- "A History of Columbus Schools: 1812–1912". Teaching Columbus.
- "West High School yearbook collection". Columbus Metropolitan Library.
- "These Are The 9 Most Endangered Historic Buildings In Columbus". Columbus Navigator.
- "David Riebel – Beck Street School". Columbus Landmarks.
- "Expansion and Growth in the Columbus Public School System (1880–1920)". Historic Columbus.
- "West High School". Columbus Makes Art.
- "The architect of the 'Shoe". Ohio State Alumni Magazine.
- "WOH Smith". Upper Arlington Historical Society.
- "Howard Dwight Smith". Praebook (Marquis Who's Who).
- "Meet the UA resident who designed Ohio Stadium 100 years after its construction". City Scene Columbus.
- "The 13 Most Beautiful High Schools In Central Ohio". Columbus Navigator.
- "The West High School cupola rises again". Columbus Messenger. 2018.
- Bush, Bill (May 16, 2017). "City school board approves $343,000 for new West High cupola". The Columbus Dispatch.
- "Not to Be Forgotten: Camp Chase Confederate Cemetery (Teaching with Historic Places)". National Park Service.
- "Camp Chase Historical Marker". Historical Marker Database.
- "Camp Chase Confederate Cemetery". National Cemetery Administration.
- "Westgate: An Affordable Oasis". Columbus Underground.
- "Columbus Board of Education v. Penick, 443 U.S. 449 (1979)". Justia.
- "Columbus Board of Education v. Penick". FindLaw.
- "Desegregation of Columbus Schools". Teaching Columbus.
- "Columbus Board of Education v. Penick". EBSCO Research Starters.
- "Columbus Board of Education v. Penick". Encyclopedia of the American Constitution.
- "Columbus Among First Districts In Nation To Desegregate". 10TV Columbus.
- "My Memories of Busing in Columbus". Columbus Monthly. 2019.
- "Desegregation of Columbus Schools". WOSU Public Media.
- "West High School". Ohio STEM Learning Network.
- "West High School". GreatSchools.
- "West High School". Columbus City Schools.
- "OHSAA Football State Tournaments All-Time Team Participants List" (PDF). Ohio High School Athletic Association.
- "OHSAA Baseball All-Time State Tournament Participants" (PDF). Ohio High School Athletic Association.
- "Johnny Edwards". Society for American Baseball Research.
- "John Edwards '56, Professional Major League Baseball Player, Gold Glove Winner". West High Alumni Association.
- "Michael Redd". Basketball Reference.
- "Michael Redd '97, Professional Basketball Player, Olympian, Humanitarian". West High Alumni Association.
- "Videos". West High Alumni Association.
- "Nancy Wilson". Hollywood Walk of Fame.
- "Nancy Wilson '54, Professional Singer, Actress, Grammy Award Winner". West High Alumni Association.
- "Nancy Wilson". National Endowment for the Arts.
- "A Lifetime of Service: Remembering Retired Lieutenant General Richard E. Carey". DVIDS. 2025.
- "Lt. Gen. Richard Carey (Ret.) '45, Distinguished Military Career". West High Alumni Association.
- "Donn F. Eisele '48, Astronaut". West High Alumni Association.
- "Donn F. Eisele". Ohio School Boards Association.
- "3 Questions: CNN's Joe Johns Talks Reporting on Politics". Ohio Magazine. 2017.
- "Joe Johns '75, National News Correspondent". West High Alumni Association.
- "Dr. Lawrence Carter, Sr., '60, Educator". West High Alumni Association.
- "Faculty Profile – Lawrence Edward Carter Sr., Ph.D." Morehouse College.
