= Murray Hill (Columbus, Ohio) =

Neighborhood on the west side of Columbus, Ohio

Coordinates: 39°57′03″N 83°07′45″W

Interactive map of the neighborhood

Murray Hill is a neighborhood on the west side of Columbus, Ohio in the United States. It is part of the Lincoln Village subdivision and is colloquially known as Lincoln Village. It is bounded by West Broad Street on the north, Sullivant Avenue on the south, South Grener Avenue on the east, and Redmond and Hiler Roads on the west. It is in Prairie Township, and the ZIP Code 43228.

== History ==
Lincoln Village was built in the late 1950s as part of a new neighborhood concept in which suburbs were built near factories and would include local schools and strip malls of stores which would support the families. It was written up in an article in Life Magazine advertising homes with modern climate control units. Lincoln Village was built near the Columbus factories for Westinghouse and General Motors. The model homes for Lincoln Village were the first few homes on the west side of Redmond Road. The development is newer than the homes on roads to its west from Woodlawn Avenue to New Rome and from South Grener Avenue to I-270. Another highlight of the neighborhood was the well-known Lincoln Lodge Motel which included a golf course which was at the northwest corner of North Murray Hill Road and West Broad Street.

The general area is home to several older buildings, and contains apartment complexes and stores. Popular stores in or near the neighborhood are KFC, CVS, and the Home Depot. Lincoln Village South is home to Stiles Elementary School. Stiles is home to children from Lincoln Park, Murray Hill, and Cherry Creek. The school has been criticized recently because it was found that during the 2005–2006 school year, 31% of the children at Stiles could not speak English. Stiles is 26% Hispanic, 25% African-American, 44% White, and 5% mixed races.

== Crime ==
Like most West Columbus neighborhoods, Murray Hill has problems with crime. It receives policing from the Columbus Division of Police Precinct 10, Franklin Township Police Department, and the Franklin County Sheriff's Department.

== See also ==
- Cherry Creek
- Lincoln Village
- West Columbus
