= Cherry Creek (Columbus, Ohio) =

Neighborhood on the West Side of Columbus, Ohio

Coordinates: 39°56′04″N 83°08′09″W

Interactive map of the neighborhood

Cherry Creek is a neighborhood on the West Side of Columbus, Ohio. It is a part of Lincoln Village and the Greater Hilltop. It contains the Oakbrook Manor (formally Lincoln Park) apartments and the Westview apartments. It is bounded on the east by Interstate 270, on the north by Sullivant Avenue, on the west by Norton Road, and on the south by Hall Road. It is in the ZIP code 43228. Its official area is West Columbus. Although they are technically two separate neighborhoods, Cherry Creek and Murray Hill are often considered the same neighborhood. They are only separated by Sullivant Avenue, and many people just consider the two together Cherry Creek. This is reflected by the Columbus Police Department grouping the two together as one neighborhood.

== Conveniences ==
Cherry Creek is known for several things. First, the Brandenberry shopping center on the western part of the neighborhood, which includes a grocery store, and several other places. It also has its own church, the Cherry Creek Church of Christ, and its own YMCA, the Hilltop YMCA.

== Demographics ==
Cherry Creek is known for being one of the most ethnically diverse neighborhoods in Columbus. The neighborhood is a mix of African Americans, Hispanics, and Caucasians. School-district statistics from Stiles Elementary, the school that serves the Cherry Creek-Murray Hill neighborhood, reflect this, showing that the area's population is 45% White, 26% Hispanic, 24% African-American, and 5% mixed races.

The same school statistics also show that 79% of those in the neighborhood live in poverty and that, during the 2005-2006 school year, 31% of the area's school-aged children could not speak English.
