= Lincoln Village, Ohio =

- Census-designated place
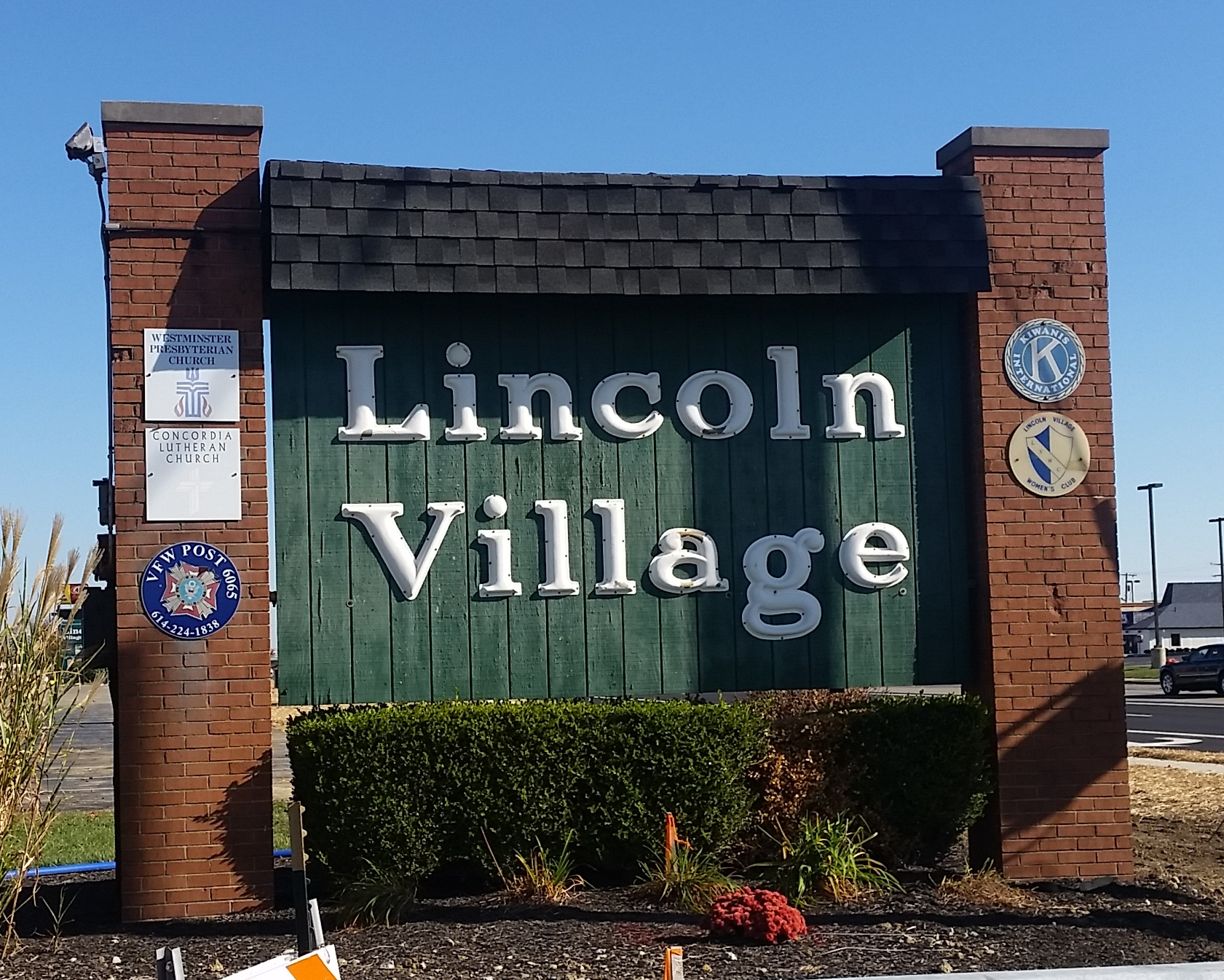
- Sign and gateway into Lincoln Village

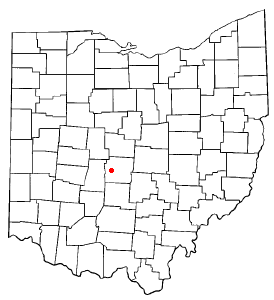
- Location of Lincoln Village, Ohio
- Coordinates: 39°57′11″N 83°07′40″W
- Country: United States
- State: Ohio
- County: Franklin
- Township: Prairie

Area
  - Total: 1.83 sq mi (4.73 km^{2})
  - Land: 1.83 sq mi (4.73 km^{2})
  - Water: 0 sq mi (0.00 km^{2})
- Elevation: 909 ft (277 m)

Population (2020)
  - Total: 9,702
  - Density: 5,315.5/sq mi (2,052.34/km^{2})
- Time zone: UTC-5 (Eastern (EST))
  - Summer (DST): UTC-4 (EDT)
- FIPS code: 39-43792
- GNIS feature ID: 2393101

Lincoln Village is a census-designated place (CDP) in Prairie Township, Franklin County, Ohio, United States. It is centered near the intersection of US 40 and I-270 on the west side of Columbus. As of the 2020 census, the population was 9,702.

Lincoln Village was started in 1955 as a planned community by a real estate subsidiary of Nationwide Insurance.

== History ==
Ohio Farm Bureau Federation President and CEO Murray Lincoln had aspired to create a suburban "village" since the early 1940s. Lincoln, as the head of what would become Nationwide Insurance from 1920 to 1948, initiated work on the Lincoln Village project in the early 1950s with the support of the U.S. Cooperative Movement. Lincoln was able to "sell" the Cooperative ideology to Ohio individual farmers, and viewed co-ops as "an answer to Communism in Europe and Asia, and as a balance wheel against unfettered private enterprise in the U.S." After founding several co-op and non co-op enterprises, Lincoln was able to fund the development of Lincoln Village with assets made from these corporations (which totaled $133,510,000). Lincoln's People's Development Corporation was formed to build Lincoln Village. The price of this project was about $30,000,000 USD. The plan for Lincoln Village included 9 miles (14 km) of streets, sewers, a pumping station, and a million-gallon water pump. Lincoln Village was built for 10,000 inhabitants, and was set around a 20-acre (8.1 ha) civic center. In 1953, bulldozers completed grading of 1,270 acres (510 ha) of farmland in western Columbus for the construction of Lincoln Village, with churches, a school, wooded park, playgrounds, and a library. A shopping center would also be built. Housing in the village was to include apartment buildings and single family homes priced between $9,000 to $16,000.

== Geography ==
Lincoln Village is located in west-central Franklin County.

The Pennsylvania Railroad borders Lincoln Village to the north, Sullivant Avenue to the south, and Interstate 270 to the east. The western border of Lincoln Village follows Hilliard Rome Road and Norton Road, the larger northwest portion by Hilliard-Rome Road and the smaller southwest portion by Norton Road. U.S. Route 40 (the National Road, known as W. Broad Street within the community) runs through the center of town, leading east 9 miles (14 km) to the center of Columbus. The city of Columbus borders Lincoln Village to the north, west, and south; a portion of Franklin Township is to the east, across I-270.

According to the United States Census Bureau, Lincoln Village has a total area of 1.83 square miles (4.75 km^{2}), all land.

Adjacent neighborhoods include New Rome, Rome Heights, Cherry Creek, and National Pike Little Farms.

== Demographics ==
Historical population
Census	Pop.	Note	%±
2020	9,702		—
U.S. Decennial Census

As of the census of 2010, there were 9,032 people, 3,734 households, and 2,265 families residing in the CDP. The racial makeup is 82.1% White, 6.3% Black or African American, 0.4% Native American, 0.9% Asian, 0% Pacific Islander, 7.3% from other races, and 3% from two or more races. Hispanic or Latino people of any race were 10.7% of the population.

There were 3,734 households, out of which 24.3% had children under the age of 18 living with them, 37.9% were married couples living together, 15.8% had a female householder with no husband present, and 39.3% were non-families. 31.8% of all households were made up of individuals living alone, and 12.9% had someone living alone who was 65 years of age or older. The average household size was 2.42 and the average family size was 3.04.

The population was spread out, with 23.6% under the age of 18, 8.3% from 18 to 24, 26.7% from 25 to 44, 26.9% from 45 to 64, and 14.5% who were 65 years of age or older. The median age was 38.2 years. For every 100 females, there were 96.8 males. For every 100 females age 18 and over, there were 93.8 males.

The median income for a household in the CDP was $41,250, and the median income for a family was $49,199. Male, full-time, year-round workers had a median income of $31,804 versus $30,807 for females. The per capita income is $19,180. About 12.8% of families and 15.8% of the population were below the poverty line, including 24.0% of those under age 18 and 5.6% of those age 65 or over.

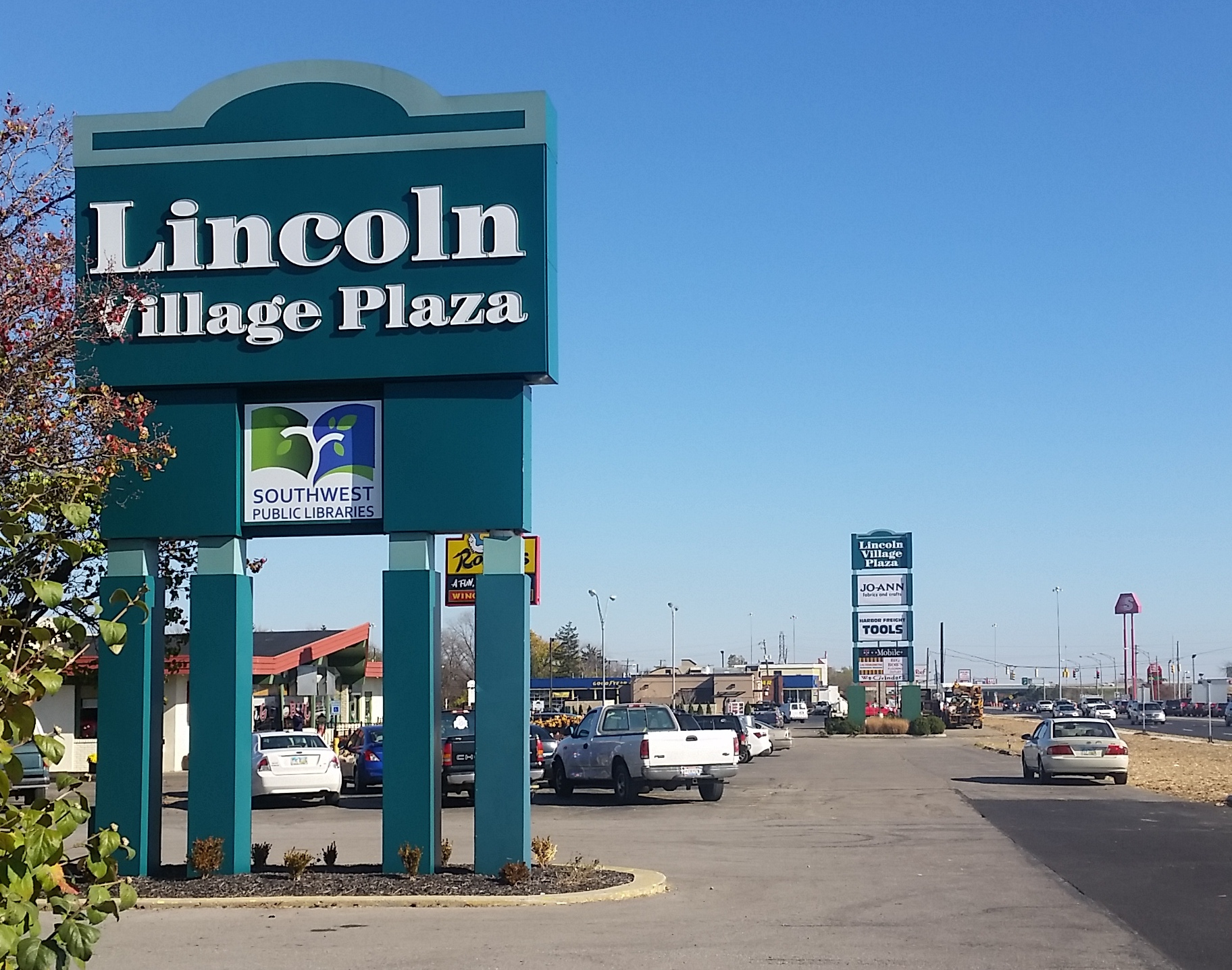
Lincoln Village Plaza

== Economy ==
Lincoln Village Plaza is a major shopping center on West Broad Street in Lincoln Village. Major tenants include Giant Eagle and the Westland Area Library. Former tenants include JoAnn Fabrics, which closed its Lincoln Village location in 2025.

== Education ==
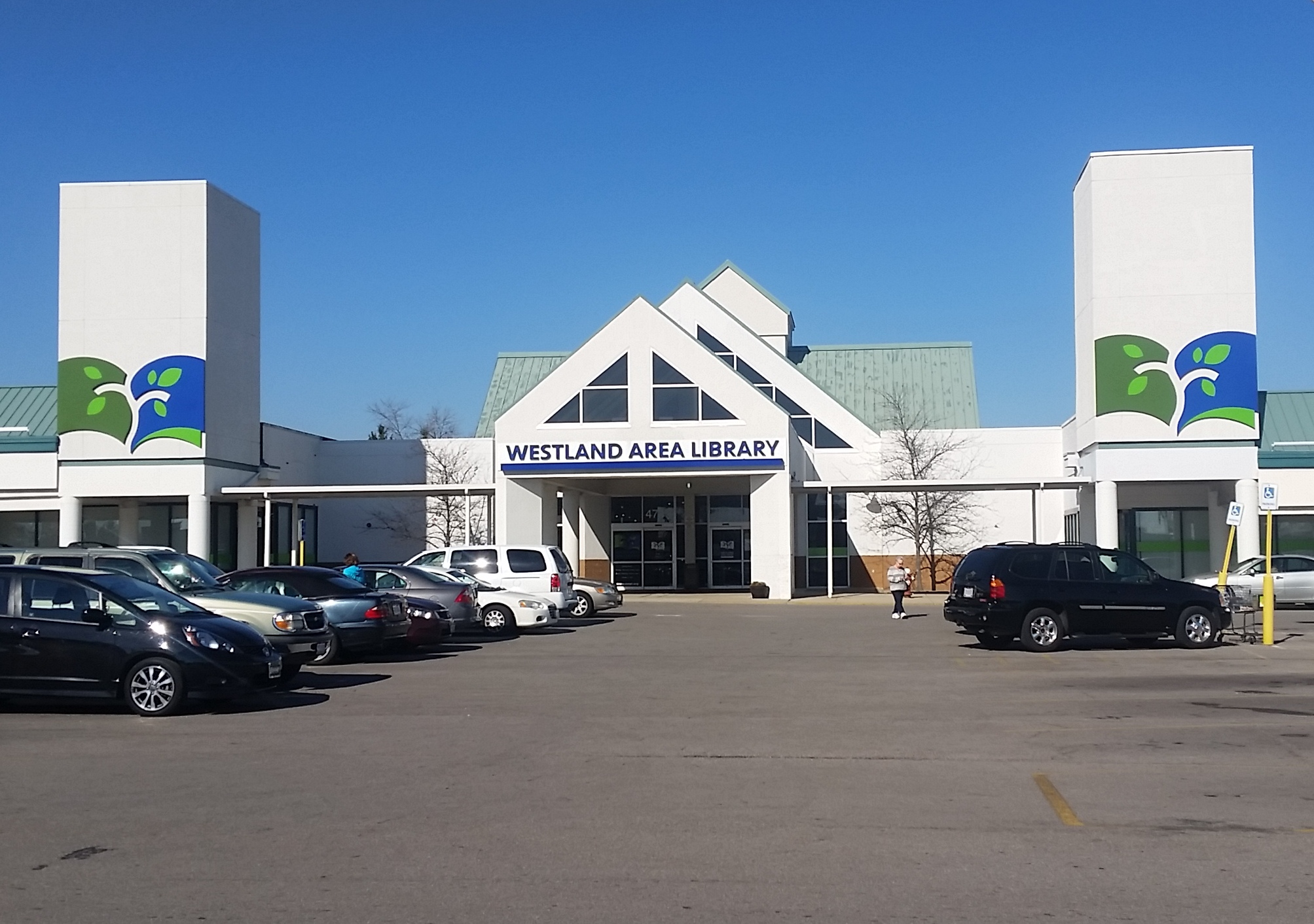
Westland Area Library

Lincoln Village is part of the South-Western City School District. As of the 2010 Census, 75.8% of the residents of Lincoln Village age 25 and over were high school graduates or higher.

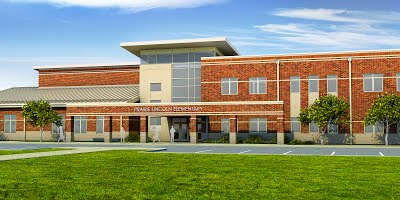
Artist's depiction of the new Prairie Lincoln, set to hold 600 students in nearly 70,000 square feet.

Both Lincoln Village North and South have an elementary school. Located on Amesbury Way in Lincoln Village North is Prairie Lincoln Elementary School. Prairie Lincoln was rebuilt in 2015 to holds 600 students. In Lincoln Village South, Stiles Elementary School is located on Stiles Avenue. It was rebuilt at the same time to the same capacity as Prairie Lincoln.

== Parks ==
Carl Frye Park is the main park in Lincoln Village North. It is located at 318 Darbyhurst Road. Located between Beacon Hill Road and Deerfield Road, Friendship Park is Lincoln Village North's second park. Lakota Park is Lincoln Village South's only park.

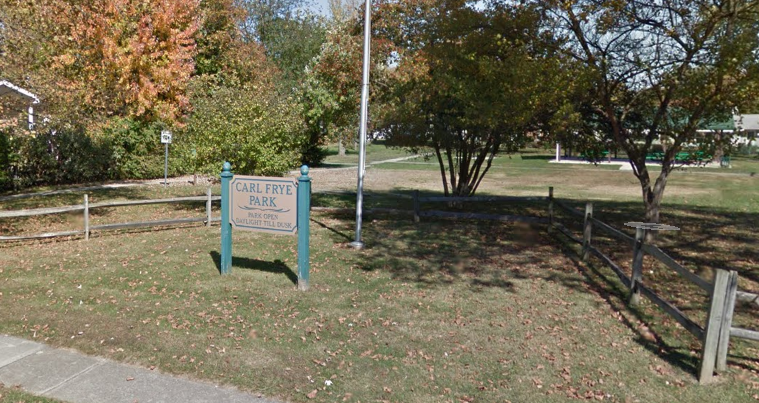
Darbyhurst Road entrance to Carl Frye Park

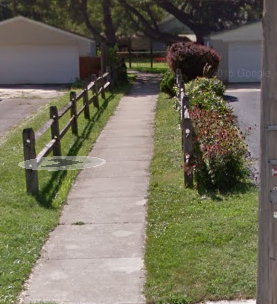
Deerfield entrance to Friendship Park

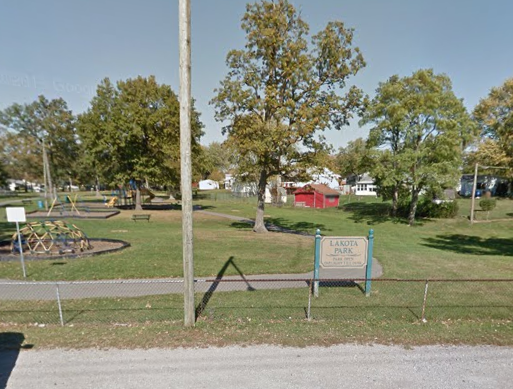
Lakota Park from Sullivant Avenue

== See also ==
- West Columbus, Ohio
