= Hartley Mound =

Native American burial mound in Columbus, Ohio, USA

- U.S. National Register of Historic Places
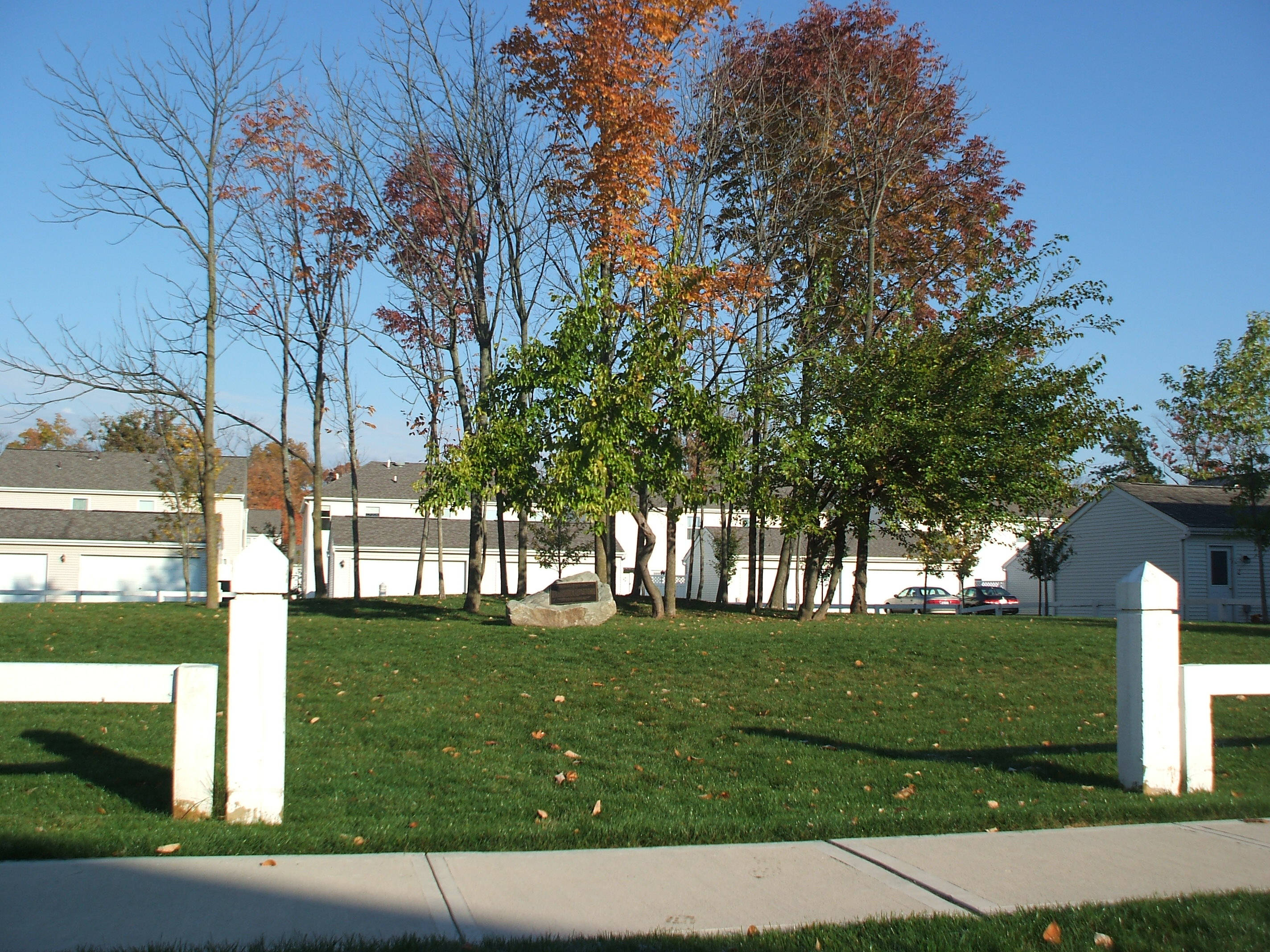
- Interactive map pinpointing the mound's location
- Location: Between Gibbstone Dr. and Edelmarr Ln., east of Wilson Rd., Columbus, Ohio
- Coordinates: 39.981959°N 83.102363°W
- Area: Less than 10 acres
- Built: c. 500 B.C. – 400 A.D.
- NRHP reference No.: 74001491
- Added to NRHP: July 15, 1974

The Hartley Mound is a Native American burial mound in Columbus, Ohio. The mound was created around 2,000 years ago by the Pre-Columbian Native American Adena culture. The site was added to the National Register of Historic Places in 1974. The mound measures 2 ft. high and 43 ft. in diameter. The site's location near a tributary to a major waterway, artifacts found nearby, and the small subconical form of the mound, suggests that it was built by the Adena culture (c. 500 B.C. – 400 A.D.). It is one of few mounds not seriously disturbed by agriculture, industry, or illegal excavation. Upon archaeological excavation, the site should provide information on Adena burial customs and domestic or mortuary structures.

Resources about the site, including its National Register of Historic Places nomination, are restricted under the Archaeological Resources Protection Act of 1979.

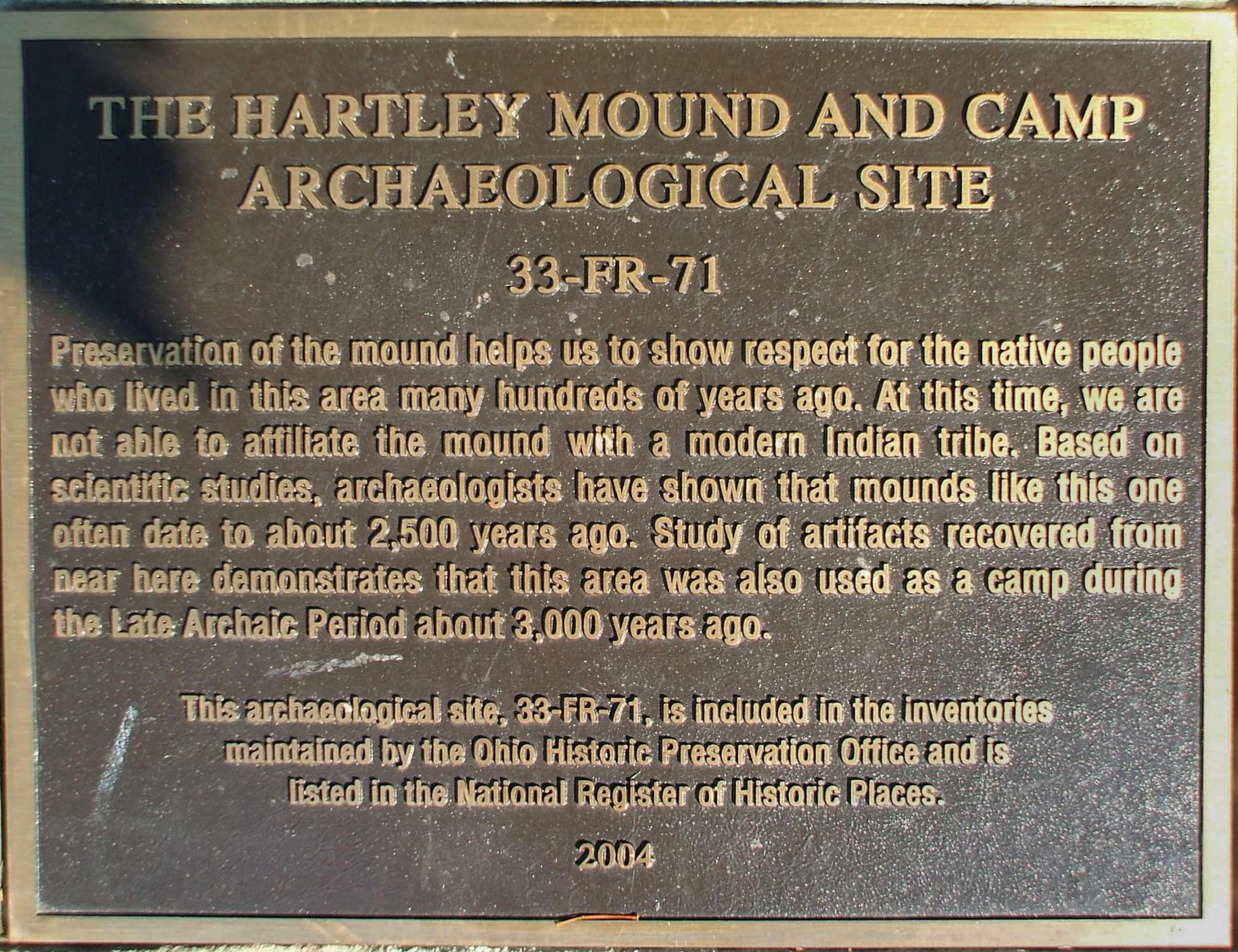
Plaque at the site

== See also ==
- National Register of Historic Places listings in Columbus, Ohio
