= West Side, Columbus, Ohio =

Geographic and cultural region of Columbus, Ohio

The West Side
- Neighborhood of Columbus
- Interactive map of The West Side
- Coordinates: 39°56′0″N 83°4′0″W
- Country: United States
- State: Ohio
- County: Franklin
- City: Columbus
- Postal codes: 43204, 43222, 43223, 43228
- Area code: 614

The West Side, in Columbus, Ohio is a geographic and cultural region of Columbus, Ohio, United States. Unlike most Columbus neighborhood names, which follow formal planning boundaries or subdivision lines, the West Side is a term of collective local identity — the way residents, media, and civic institutions describe the southwestern quadrant of the city. The area is bounded roughly on the north by Interstates 70 and 670, on the east by Interstate 71, and on the south and west by the city limits, which extend well beyond the I-270 outerbelt. It encompasses ZIP codes 43204, 43222, 43223, and 43228.

The area holds some of the oldest continuously inhabited land in Franklin County, with a history spanning Native American earthworks, early American settlement, Civil War encampment, and a twentieth-century peak as a manufacturing-anchored working-class community. Policing is provided by the Columbus Division of Police (Precincts 8, 10, and 19), the Franklin Township Police Department, and the Franklin County Sheriff's Department.

== Geography ==
The West Side occupies the southwestern portion of Columbus and is among the city's largest geographic areas. The region includes several incorporated and unincorporated jurisdictions: portions of Franklin Township, Prairie Township, and Jackson Township, along with the City of Urbancrest and the Village of Valleyview.

To the west, the urban grid gives way to farmland and the floodplains of the Big Darby Creek watershed, federally designated as a National Scenic River and recognized by the U.S. Fish and Wildlife Service for aquatic biodiversity among the highest of any Midwestern stream. The Scioto River marks the eastern edge, separating the West Side from Franklinton and downtown.

The main commercial spine is West Broad Street (U.S. Route 40), the old National Road route and still the most significant east-west artery in Franklin County. Sullivant Avenue, Hague Avenue, and Georgesville Road serve as additional major corridors.

== Neighborhoods ==
"The West Side" is an umbrella term encompassing a number of distinct, named communities, each with its own character and history.

Franklinton is the oldest of these communities and one of the oldest in all of central Ohio, founded in 1797 by Lucas Sullivant on the west bank of the Scioto River — predating the city of Columbus itself by 15 years. Long known as "The Bottoms" because of its low-lying position along the Scioto floodplain, Franklinton was repeatedly inundated throughout its history. The federal government prohibited new development there in the 1980s. That changed with the completion of a 7.2-mile floodwall — at a cost of more than $134 million — in 2004, which unlocked the neighborhood for a generation of creative reinvestment.

The Hilltop is both the largest of The West Side's neighborhoods and, in many ways, its civic and cultural center of gravity. Covering approximately 9,917 acres, The Greater Hilltop planning area functions less as a single neighborhood than as a collection of smaller ones — which is the point of its motto, "A Neighborhood of Neighborhoods." It encompasses multiple jurisdictions, its own Area Commission, its own library branch, and a community identity strong enough to have put two consecutive mayors in Columbus City Hall.

Westgate is one of Columbus's more distinctive streetcar suburbs, developed in the early 1920s on land with a complicated past — first a Civil War prison camp, then briefly a Quaker settlement, then a real estate subdivision whose street names still quietly honor the Quaker families who owned the land between those chapters. The housing it produced — Cape Cods, bungalows, Tudor cottages, Colonial Revival homes — gives the neighborhood an architectural variety that has made it a reliable draw for buyers who want character without the price tag of higher-profile Columbus neighborhoods.

Lincoln Village was a planned community founded in 1955 by the Peoples Development Company, a real estate subsidiary of what would become Nationwide Insurance. Named for Nationwide president Murray D. Lincoln, the $30 million project broke ground on 1,270 acres of farmland and was designed from the outset to be a self-contained community — with its own school, library, churches, civic center, shopping center, and parkland — built to house 10,000 residents. Lincoln Village made national news and was featured in Life magazine for its modern homes and "climate control" amenities. It was deliberately sited close to the General Motors and Westinghouse plants on the west side, so that workers could, as one company representative told the Columbus Dispatch, "use [their saved commuting time] for rest in the morning and recreation in the afternoon."

Georgian Heights and its neighbor Holly Hill are mid-century residential communities south of the Hilltop core. Cherry Creek, Murray Hill, Riverbend, Briggsdale, Hardesty Heights, and Wiltshire Heights round out the West Side neighborhood geography, each a distinct residential community within the broader west-side identity.

== History ==
=== Native American presence and early settlement ===
Long before European-American settlement, the land now known as the West Side was inhabited by Native Americans, whose presence is evidenced throughout the region in the form of earthworks, artifacts, and burial sites. The fertile terrain along the Scioto River and the elevated ridgeline that would later be called "Sullivant's Hill" — and eventually The Hilltop — made the area particularly attractive for habitation.

Lucas Sullivant arrived in 1795 and became the first person to be granted a deed to land in what is now The Hilltop and Franklinton area, establishing Franklinton on the west bank of the Scioto River in 1797. Sullivant retained approximately 1,600 acres of elevated land to the west, which he transferred to his sons, making them the area's first documented landowners. The land remained within the Sullivant family for over a century. During this early period, the area was largely agricultural, with farmers producing corn, clover seed, and hay and raising livestock.

=== Franklinton and the War of 1812 ===
Before Camp Chase, before the National Road, Franklinton itself played an outsized role in American military history. In the fall of 1812, General William Henry Harrison — later the ninth President of the United States — established Franklinton as the central headquarters and supply depot for the Army of the Northwest during the War of 1812. Up to 3,000 troops assembled in the public square for inspections and training before marching north toward the frontier. The settlement's strategic position at the confluence of the Scioto and Olentangy rivers made it the most logical staging point in the region.

The building traditionally associated with Harrison's headquarters, a Federal-style brick structure at 570 West Broad Street built in 1807, still stands today. Known as the Harrison House, it was listed on the National Register of Historic Places in 1972 and is described by preservationists as the only remaining building in Ohio associated with Harrison's military presence in the region. In 1973, the building's owner announced plans to demolish it for a gas station. Councilwoman Fran Ryan led the effort to save it, and the Columbus Society for the Preservation of the Harrison House purchased the building in 1975. The adjacent Sullivant Land Office — built c. 1822 and the only remaining structure associated with Franklinton founder Lucas Sullivant — stands on the same site, having been relocated there from its original location on W. Gay Street in the early 1980s to prevent demolition.

=== The National Road and early development ===
The most transformative early development in the West Side was the construction of the National Road — or Route 40 — in the 1830s. The road, which followed an earlier trace through the area and became what is now known as West Broad Street, instantly elevated the region's commercial and strategic importance. Establishments such as the Four-Mile House and the Jaybird Hotel appeared along this thoroughfare, providing lodging and services for travelers moving west across the young nation. The National Road remains designated an Ohio Scenic Byway and is recognized by the Ohio Department of Transportation as a historic corridor.

=== Camp Chase and the Civil War ===
One of the most historically significant sites on the West Side — and indeed in the entire state of Ohio — is Camp Chase, a Union military installation established in May 1861 on land leased by the U.S. Government four miles west of downtown Columbus. Named for former Ohio Governor and then Secretary of the Treasury Salmon P. Chase, the camp's boundaries corresponded to the present-day intersections of Broad Street (north), Hague Avenue (east), Sullivant Avenue (south), and near Westgate Avenue (west).

Camp Chase began as a training and mustering ground for Ohio Union volunteers but quickly grew into the largest prisoner-of-war camp in the North. Between 1861 and 1865, more than 150,000 Union soldiers and over 25,000 Confederate prisoners passed through its gates. At its peak in February 1865, more than 9,400 men were held there. Four future United States presidents — Andrew Johnson, Rutherford B. Hayes, James Garfield, and William McKinley — passed through Camp Chase during the war.

When the camp closed in 1865, a small portion of the land was preserved as a cemetery. The Camp Chase Confederate Cemetery, located at 2900 Sullivant Avenue, holds the remains of Confederate soldiers who died in captivity. A memorial boulder installed in 1897 bears the inscription "2260 Confederate Soldiers of the war 1861–1865 buried in this enclosure," though the U.S. Department of Veterans Affairs official count records approximately 2,168 remains. The memorial arch at the cemetery was dedicated in 1902, and the site was listed on the National Register of Historic Places on April 11, 1973. The Hilltop Historical Society sponsors an annual memorial service at the cemetery on the first Sunday of June.

The land once occupied by Camp Chase was gradually developed into the Westgate neighborhood beginning in the late 1920s.

=== Urban growth and industrialization ===
By 1900, the population of what is now The Hilltop had grown to over 2,000 residents, the majority of them young married couples engaged in a variety of occupations. The early twentieth century brought rapid urbanization. Residential subdivisions emerged around major institutional anchors, streets were laid along former rural roads, and a streetcar line connecting High Street to the Columbus State Hospital accelerated the area's development.

The Columbus State Hospital for the Insane, built in 1870 at a site bordered by Broad Street and Wheatland Avenue, was one of the defining institutions of early the West Side. Following the Kirkbride Plan — an architectural philosophy designed to provide patients with "air and sunlight" — the hospital employed nearly 450 people, many of whom settled in the surrounding neighborhoods. The building was closed in the 1980s, demolished in 1997, and replaced by offices of the Ohio Department of Transportation and the Ohio Department of Public Safety.

Following the catastrophic 1913 flood that inundated lower-lying sections of Columbus, a substantial population surge moved into the elevated western neighborhoods, which were far less affected by the disaster. By 1924, the population of The Greater Hilltop alone had reached 15,000, and the community was self-sustaining with its own schools, employers, and services.

The mid-twentieth century brought industrial employment that further anchored the West Side as a working-class community of homeowners. General Motors, which operated Fisher Body and Delphi divisions in the area, was the primary employer for many West Side families for decades. The area's political clout grew accordingly — the West Side produced two consecutive mayors of Columbus: Maynard Edward "Jack" Sensenbrenner, a lifelong Hilltop resident who taught the largest adult Sunday school class in Ohio at Hoge Memorial Presbyterian Church, served as mayor from 1954 to 1960 and again from 1964 to 1972 — fourteen years in total, longer than any other mayor at the time. His annexation policy drove Columbus's growth from 41 to more than 140 square miles and earned the city the All-American City designation in 1959. His Republican successor, Ralston Westlake (1960–1964), was born on South Highland Avenue in the Hilltop and lived there his entire life.

The Hilltop also became home to many prosperous African American families in the early twentieth century. Among the most notable was the Carter family, Virginia migrants whose eleven children — born between 1900 and 1940 — became civic leaders across Ohio and California. Mary Carter Glascor and her brother, Judge Russell Carter, each earned advanced degrees, including from Harvard University, following undergraduate study at The Ohio State University.

The area's Hispanic community began taking root during the second half of the twentieth century and has grown substantially, making the west side of Columbus — particularly The Hilltop and Valleyview — one of the primary centers of Latino life in Central Ohio, with persons of Mexican descent comprising the largest Hispanic group. The area also has a growing Somali Bantu and broader East African population, the result of federal refugee resettlement programs that have made Columbus one of the largest Somali communities in the United States.

== Economy and development ==
Manufacturing defined the West Side for most of the twentieth century. When the major industrial employers departed in the 1980s and 1990s, they left gaps that took decades to fill — and that redevelopment continues today.

The opening of Hollywood Casino Columbus in October 2012 was the area's most visible economic turning point. Built on the former Delphi/General Motors site — idle since 2007 — the casino landed on the West Side after a statewide voter referendum shifted it from its originally planned downtown location. The 160,000-square-foot facility, operated by Penn Entertainment and owned by Gaming and Leisure Properties, has over 1,700 slot machines, 65 table games, and the largest poker room in Ohio. Casino revenues are taxed at 33 percent, with shares going to public school districts, the host city, and all 88 Ohio counties.

Columbus has designated portions of The Hilltop as a Community Reinvestment Area, offering 15-year, 100-percent tax abatements on qualifying projects that include an affordable housing component. The 2005 West Broad Street Economic Development Strategy and the 2008 Hilltop/West Broad Corridor Market Analysis have guided corridor revitalization since their adoption.

The Greater Hilltop Area Commission holds monthly public meetings and acts as the formal liaison between residents, property owners, developers, and city officials on land use matters.

== Housing ==
The housing stock of the West Side is predominantly single-family, built mostly during the area's rapid growth in the first half of the twentieth century. The Greater Hilltop — the largest component of the West Side — is 81 percent single-family residential, with multifamily (14 percent) and two-to-three-family (5 percent) housing making up the balance. The typical home in the core Hilltop neighborhoods dates to around 1929, a streetcar-suburb vintage that gives the area a consistent architectural character its residents have long considered a defining asset.

=== Property values and recent appreciation ===
The West Side has offered some of the most affordable homeownership options in the Columbus market, drawing first-time buyers and investors in equal measure. That affordability has not come at the cost of appreciation — lower starting price points combined with rising demand have produced some of the largest percentage gains in assessed value in Franklin County.

The Auditor's 2023 triennial reappraisal — described by Auditor Michael Stinziano as "historic" — recorded an average countywide increase of 41 percent since the 2020 cycle, itself a record. Portions of the West Side in the South-Western City School District saw increases of roughly 50 percent, driven by regional demand, constrained inventory, and growing private investment. Stinziano noted that lower-priced communities tend to show the steepest jumps as they "catch up" to market conditions — a pattern that has benefited long-term West Side homeowners substantially.

Citywide, the Columbus and Central Ohio Regional MLS recorded a median sales price of $346,500 as of April 2026, up 8.3 percent year over year, with an average of $396,480, up 5.9 percent. West Side neighborhoods have drawn increasing buyer interest at price points well below those figures.

Real estate analysts have placed The Hilltop and Franklinton in an "early-stage revitalization" category, with cap rates between 7 and 10 percent — among the best in the city. The Envision Hilltop planning initiative found renovated homes commanding prices well above the neighborhood average, with upper-market properties trading between $100,000 and $150,000 at the time of that study — below the 2019 Columbus-area median of $220,000, but a clear signal of the direction prices have moved since.

=== New construction and investment ===
New apartment construction has accelerated in Franklinton, with hundreds of units completed on the eastern side of the neighborhood. New single-family homes are also filling formerly vacant lots to the north, led by Franklinton NOW — a Columbus-based New City Homes initiative to build more than 50 homes and duplexes along Yale Avenue and Central Avenue. Those homes are priced between $374,900 and $494,900 and qualify for the city's 15-year property tax abatement.

The WestRich development — a $70 million mixed-income project by CASTO and the Columbus Metropolitan Housing Authority (CMHA) at 509 West Rich Street — will deliver 235 units across two buildings with ground-floor retail when complete. Habitat for Humanity MidOhio has built roughly 40 homes in The Hilltop focus area since 1995 and completed repair and rehabilitation work for dozens more existing residents.

The Hilltop's Community Reinvestment Area designation offers 15-year, 100-percent property tax abatements for qualifying projects — a tool designed to pull private investment into the neighborhood while preserving some affordability in new construction.

== Education ==
The West Side is served primarily by Columbus City Schools, along with the South-Western City Schools district in portions of the far west side.

West High School, located at 179 South Powell Avenue in the Westgate neighborhood, is the area's flagship public high school. A member of the Columbus City League athletic conference, West High — whose teams are known as the Cowboys — has a storied history and an alumni roster that includes an astronaut, an NBA All-Star, a Grammy Award-winning jazz singer, and NASA personnel.

Franklin Heights High School, part of the South-Western City Schools district, serves the southwestern portion of the West Side, including portions of Lincoln Village and Prairie Township.

Bishop Ready High School, a Catholic institution affiliated with the Roman Catholic Diocese of Columbus, is also located in the Westgate area and serves students from across the west side.

The Hilltop Branch of the Columbus Metropolitan Library, located at 511 S. Hague Avenue, is one of the larger branches in the system and hosts the monthly public meetings of The Greater Hilltop Area Commission.

== Transportation ==
The West Side has been a transportation corridor since before Columbus existed. The National Road — now West Broad Street (U.S. Route 40) — was the country's first federally funded highway, built through the area in the 1830s and carrying westward migration and commerce for a century. Rail lines followed the same corridor, and the proximity of rail to road made the west side a natural home for manufacturing.

Today the area's geography is largely defined by its freeways. Interstate 70 runs along the northern edge, Interstate 71 the eastern boundary, and Interstate 270 — Columbus's outer belt — the southern and western perimeter. COTA (Central Ohio Transit Authority) bus routes serve the major corridors, and the Camp Chase Trail connects the area to the Ohio to Erie Trail system for cyclists.

== Culture and arts ==
=== Franklinton Arts District ===
Franklinton's turnaround since the 2004 floodwall is one of the more unusual revitalization stories in the Midwest. The Franklinton Development Association bet on artists rather than retailers or office tenants, drawing creative-economy businesses into a neighborhood that federal flood regulations had effectively frozen since the 1980s.

The anchor of that strategy is the Columbus Idea Foundry, at 421 W. State Street in a century-old former shoe factory that once also served as a Harley-Davidson dealership. When the Foundry moved to Franklinton in 2014, its 65,000-square-foot space made it the largest community makerspace in the world, according to TechCrunch and Digital Engineering. It offers members access to 3D printers, laser cutters, CNC mills, welding equipment, woodworking tools, and pottery kilns, and counts more than 500 entrepreneurs, artists, and makers among its community. Kaufman Development acquired the Foundry in 2022 as part of the larger Gravity campus taking shape in east Franklinton.

The 400 West Rich complex, street-art installations along Lucas Street, and the annual Urban Scrawl outdoor mural festival have made east Franklinton a recognized center of public art. The George Bellows Grant Program — named for the Columbus-born painter — directs proceeds from Urban Scrawl sales back into Franklinton arts projects, a self-sustaining loop that keeps the district funded from within.

Breweries, restaurants, and mixed-use residential projects have followed the artists in: The Peninsula development along the Scioto riverfront and the $70 million WestRich project at 509 West Rich Street are among the most visible recent additions.

== Historic sites ==
The West Side holds an unusually dense collection of National Register of Historic Places listings, spanning prehistoric earthworks, early American settlement, Civil War history, and industrial-era architecture. The following properties are listed on the National Register:

- Camp Chase Site (2900 Sullivant Ave.) — Listed April 11, 1973. The preserved remnant of the Civil War's largest Union prison camp, encompassing the Camp Chase Confederate Cemetery where more than 2,000 Confederate soldiers who died in captivity are interred. A stone memorial arch dedicated in 1902 marks the entrance. Maintained by the U.S. Department of Veterans Affairs.
- Gen. William Henry Harrison Headquarters (570 W. Broad St.) — Listed December 15, 1972. A Federal-style brick structure built in 1807 and traditionally associated with General William Henry Harrison's use of Franklinton as a staging ground for the Army of the Northwest during the War of 1812. Now owned and operated by the Columbus Historical Society.
- Sullivant Land Office (13 N. Gift St.) — Listed March 20, 1973. Built c. 1822, this small brick building is the only remaining structure associated with Franklinton founder Lucas Sullivant. Originally located at 714 W. Gay Street, it was relocated to its present site behind the Harrison House in the early 1980s to prevent demolition.
- Franklinton Post Office (72 S. Gift St.) — Listed March 20, 1973. Also known as the David Deardurff House, this hand-hewn log structure built in 1807 is the oldest building in Columbus still standing on its original foundation, and served as the neighborhood's first post office.
- Engine House No. 6 (540 W. Broad St.) — Listed September 2, 2016. A Romanesque Revival fire station built in 1892 by architect John Flynn, decommissioned in 1966. The building still features its original stables and feed loft. Now part of the Franklinton arts district and owned by the Columbus Historical Society.
- Shrum Mound (3141 McKinley Ave., Campbell Park) — Listed November 10, 1970. One of the last remaining ancient conical burial mounds within the Columbus city limits, built by the Adena culture approximately 2,000 years ago (c. 800 B.C.–A.D. 100). It stands 20 feet tall with a diameter of 100 feet, situated on a high bluff on the west side of the Scioto River. Owned and maintained by the Ohio History Connection; free and open to the public.
- Hartley Mound (east of Wilson Rd.) — Listed July 15, 1974. A prehistoric Native American burial mound on the western edge of Columbus, associated with the Adena cultural tradition (c. 500 B.C.–A.D. 400). The mound measures approximately 2 feet high and 43 feet in diameter. Location details are restricted under the Archaeological Resources Protection Act.
- Anson Davis House (4900 Hayden Run Rd.) — Listed February 20, 1975. A historic farmhouse on the far northwest edge of the West Side, near Hayden Falls Park.
- Anson Davis Springhouse (4900 Hayden Run Rd.) — Listed March 22, 1979. A contributing structure on the Anson Davis property, listed separately on the National Register.
- Franklinton Apartments at Broad and Hawkes (949–957 W. Broad St.) — Listed April 22, 2005. A pair of L-shaped rowhouse buildings built in 1900, containing 22 apartments in the commercial heart of Franklinton.
- Franklinton Apartments at State and May (494–504 State St.) — Listed April 22, 2005. A companion L-shaped corner rowhouse building also constructed in 1900, representing the same wave of speculative residential development in Franklinton at the turn of the twentieth century.
- 120 S. Central Avenue — Listed September 6, 2022. A Neoclassical school building constructed in 1908, designed by architect David Riebel. Built as the original West High School, the structure later served as Starling Middle School and Starling Elementary School.
- Bellows Avenue School (725 Bellows Ave.) — NRHP Ref. No. 100009450. A Renaissance Revival elementary school built in 1905, designed by David Riebel and constructed by George Bellows Sr. — father of the painter George Bellows — for whom both the school and its street are named. The school served Franklinton students until 1977 and has since stood largely vacant, its fate complicated by the I-70/71 highway reconstruction project.
- Lubal Manufacturing & Distributing Company (373–375 W. Rich St.) — Listed July 19, 2016. A pair of industrial buildings in Franklinton built c. 1900 and c. 1911, among the few remaining structures demonstrating Franklinton's early industrial history.
- Central High School (75 S. Washington Blvd.) — Listed March 7, 1985. A Classical Revival school building constructed in 1924, designed by architect William B. Ittner. Once Columbus's premier secondary school, it was later converted into the home of COSI (Center of Science and Industry). Located at the eastern edge of Franklinton on the Scioto riverfront.
- Green Lawn Cemetery (1000 Greenlawn Ave.) — Listed 2024. Ohio's second-largest cemetery at 360 acres, established in 1848. Green Lawn contains more than 155,000 burials and is the resting place of numerous Ohio governors, Civil War veterans, and Columbus civic figures.
- Green Lawn Abbey (700 Greenlawn Ave., Franklin Township) — Listed June 27, 2007. A Classical Revival mausoleum built in 1927, located adjacent to Green Lawn Cemetery in Franklin Township, just outside the Columbus city limits. Finished with granite exterior, white marble interior, imported tile roof, and more than 100 stained glass windows.
- Central Ohio Lunatic Asylum (1960 W. Broad St.) — Listed 1986; demolished. The original Columbus State Hospital for the Insane, built in 1870 following the Kirkbride Plan, was closed in the 1980s and demolished in 1997. Its listing on the National Register was removed following demolition.

== Recreation and attractions ==
The West Side ranges from Civil War burial grounds and prehistoric mounds to a world-record makerspace and one of the nation's most distinctive new urban parks. The area's green space network within The Greater Hilltop boundary alone exceeds 569 acres, managed in part by The Greater Hilltop Area Commission's Recreation and Parks Committee.

- Camp Chase Confederate Cemetery (2900 Sullivant Avenue) — The sole surviving remnant of the Civil War's largest Union prison camp. A central boulder bears the inscription "2260 Confederate Soldiers of the War 1861–1865 Buried in This Enclosure," and marble headstones mark each grave. The stone memorial arch, erected in 1902, gives the site a formal, quietly powerful atmosphere. The Hilltop Historical Society holds an annual memorial service here on the first Sunday of June. Free and open to the public.
- Battelle Darby Creek Metro Park (1775 Darby Creek Drive) — At 7,103 acres, the largest park in the Columbus and Franklin County Metro Parks system. Features restored tallgrass prairie, woodland trails, wetlands, and creek corridors along the Big and Little Darby Creeks. The park's resident bison herd, reintroduced to native prairie in 2011, is one of the most distinctive wildlife-viewing opportunities in Central Ohio. Free admission.
- Quarry Trails Metro Park (2158 Old Dublin Road) — Carved from the site of the Marble Cliff Quarry — once the largest contiguous quarry in the United States — which supplied the limestone used to build the Ohio Statehouse. The 182-acre park features Millikin Falls, a 25-foot waterfall; a via ferrata and sport climbing area; single-track mountain bike trails; kayaking on Swan Lake and Turtle Cove; and a floating boardwalk. Opened November 2021. Free admission.
- National Veterans Memorial and Museum (300 W. Broad Street) — The only nationally designated museum in the United States dedicated to honoring veterans of all branches of military service. Conceived by Senator and astronaut John Glenn, the museum opened in 2018 and focuses on veterans' personal stories through artifacts, oral histories, letters, films, and a striking floor-to-ceiling stained-glass installation in its Remembrance Gallery. Admission is free for veterans and active military.
- The Harrison House and Sullivant Land Office (570 W. Broad Street) — Two of the oldest surviving structures in Columbus, maintained by the Columbus Historical Society. The Harrison House (1807) is associated by tradition with General William Henry Harrison's War of 1812 headquarters; the Sullivant Land Office (c. 1822) is the only remaining structure associated with Franklinton founder Lucas Sullivant. Both are listed on the National Register of Historic Places and open for public programs and group tours.
- Columbus Idea Foundry (421 W. State Street) — One of the largest community makerspaces in the world at 65,000 square feet, housed in a century-old former shoe factory in the heart of Franklinton's arts district. Members and visitors have access to 3D printers, laser cutters, welding equipment, CNC mills, woodworking tools, and pottery kilns. The facility hosts public classes, workshops, and events open to non-members.
- 400 West Rich / 400 Square (400 W. Rich Street) — A converted 1910-era industrial building housing resident artists, galleries, and event space. Franklinton Fridays, held on the second Friday of each month from 6 to 10 p.m., opens artist studios to the public and anchors a neighborhood-wide gallery and food tour. Free to attend.
- Westgate Park — A 46.3-acre neighborhood park on the former Camp Chase grounds. Hosts the annual Summer Jam West arts and music festival each July, The Hilltop Bean Dinner each June, and year-round amenities including a fishing pond, three playgrounds, picnic shelters, and the Heroes of Camp Chase mural by artist Curtis Goldstein. This annual tradition of gathering at the park dates to the 1930s.
- Camp Chase Trail — A 16-mile paved rail trail running from Madison County through the West Side to the Scioto Greenway, connecting Battelle Darby Creek Metro Park, Quarry Trails, and several west-side neighborhoods. Part of the Ohio to Erie Trail and U.S. Bicycle Route 50. Free and open year-round.
- Hollywood Casino Columbus (777 Hollywood Blvd.) — A 160,000-square-foot gaming and entertainment complex opened in 2012 on the former site of the Delphi/General Motors plant, featuring more than 1,700 slot machines, 65 table games, the largest poker room in Ohio, and multiple dining venues.

Additional recreational assets include Big Run Park and Athletic Complex, Westmoor Park, Holton Park, Glenview Park, and Riverbend Park, each serving distinct residential communities within the broader West Side geography. The Hilltop YMCA and The Hilltop Swim Club provide additional fitness and aquatic programming for West Side residents.

== Notable residents ==
The West Side has produced an unusually wide range of public figures — among them an Olympic champion, an astronaut, a Hall of Fame jazz singer, an NBA All-Star, two mayors, and one of the most celebrated American painters of the twentieth century.

- George Bellows (1882–1925) — Columbus-born painter who studied at The Ohio State University before moving to New York City in 1904. Bellows became a leading figure of the Ashcan School, best known for his boxing scenes (Stag at Sharkey's, Both Members of This Club) and gritty urban realism. The Columbus Museum of Art has called him "the most acclaimed American artist of his generation." The Franklinton arts community honors his legacy through the George Bellows Grant Program.
- Maynard "Jack" Sensenbrenner (1902–1991) — The 46th and 48th Mayor of Columbus, a lifelong Hilltop resident who served a combined fourteen years in office — 1954 to 1960 and 1964 to 1972 — longer than any Columbus mayor before him. His annexation program expanded the city from 41 to more than 140 square miles and helped position Columbus to become Ohio's largest city. Columbus earned the All-American City designation in 1959 on his watch. On the west side he was equally well known for running the largest adult Sunday school class in Ohio at Hoge Memorial Presbyterian Church and for coining the word "spizzerinctum" — his shorthand for boundless civic energy. A marker and monument honoring him stand in Glenwood Park.
- W. Ralston Westlake (1907–1978) — The 47th Mayor of Columbus (1960–1964), born on South Highland Avenue in The Hilltop and a lifelong west-side resident. A West High School graduate (class of 1925), World War II veteran, and Republican, he served one term between Sensenbrenner's two stints. Westlake was also, as of his death, the only manufacturer of genuine ruby glass in the United States — a craft he mastered by reverse-engineering a Bohemian secret process, hand-painting glass with chemicals and firing it in kilns he built himself. Upon his death in 1978, the Columbus Citizen Journal wrote that "he never carried a grudge," and his successor Mayor Tom Moody called him "one of the kindest, most gentle, thoughtful persons I've ever encountered in public office."
- Jesse Owens (1913–1980) — Four-time gold medalist at the 1936 Berlin Olympics and one of the most celebrated track and field athletes in history, Owens lived at 292 S. Oakley Avenue in The Hilltop while attending The Ohio State University. Black students were barred from living in campus dormitories, and Owens' South Oakley home became a neighborhood landmark — the 1996 Olympic torch route was redirected past the house in his honor.
- Nancy Wilson (1937–2018) — Jazz, blues, and pop singer with more than 70 albums and three Grammy Awards. Wilson attended West High School, where at age 15 she won a talent contest sponsored by local television station WTVN and earned a hosting role on the TV program Skyline Melodies. She later toured professionally before relocating to New York City, where Cannonball Adderley helped launch her national career.
- Donn F. Eisele (1930–1987) — NASA astronaut and United States Air Force colonel who served as Command Module Pilot for Apollo 7 in 1968 — the first crewed flight of the Apollo spacecraft. Eisele graduated from West High School in 1948 and became the first and only astronaut from Columbus. He was posthumously awarded the NASA Distinguished Service Medal for the Apollo 7 mission.
- Michael Redd (born 1979) — NBA shooting guard who grew up in The Hilltop neighborhood (210 South Terrace) and attended West High School before starring at The Ohio State University. Redd was selected in the 2000 NBA Draft by the Milwaukee Bucks, with whom he spent 11 of his 12 professional seasons. He was named an NBA All-Star in 2004, earned All-NBA Third Team honors, and won a gold medal as a member of the U.S. Olympic basketball team in Beijing in 2008. In 2025, he was inducted into the Naismith Memorial Basketball Hall of Fame as a member of the 2008 U.S. Olympic team. After retiring from basketball, Redd became a venture capitalist, founding 22 Ventures and investing in more than 85 companies.
- Mary Carter Glascor and Judge Russell Carter — Prominent civic leaders who grew up in The Hilltop in the early twentieth century and both went on to earn graduate degrees, including from Harvard University, following undergraduate study at The Ohio State University.
- Bea Murphy — Poet, historian, and community storyteller long recognized as one of the West Side's most beloved cultural voices and a keeper of neighborhood history.

== See also ==
- The Hilltop, Columbus, Ohio
- Franklinton, Columbus, Ohio
- Camp Chase
- Westgate, Columbus, Ohio
- Battelle Darby Creek Metro Park
- West High School (Columbus, Ohio)
- National Road
