= Distichophyllum carinatum =

Conservation status
- Endangered (IUCN 3.1)

Scientific classification
- Kingdom: Plantae
- Division: Bryophyta
- Class: Bryopsida
- Subclass: Bryidae
- Order: Hookeriales
- Family: Daltoniaceae
- Genus: Distichophyllum
- Species: D. carinatum

Binomial name
- Distichophyllum carinatum Dixon & W.E.Nicholson

Species of moss

Distichophyllum carinatum is a species of moss in the family Daltoniaceae. It is native to Europe and Asia, where it has a disjunct distribution. It is known to occur in Germany, China, and Japan. It is also known from Austria and Switzerland, but it may be extinct there today. It is very uncommon where it still occurs, growing in only four locations. It is listed as an endangered species by the International Union for Conservation of Nature.

This moss is yellow-green in color and it grows in dense tufts. The crowded leaves are keeled.

This species occurs in wet limestone forests. It grows on rocks and tree trunks in acidic substrates.

The small, scattered populations are considered to be endangered because the species is likely very sensitive to environmental changes such as drying and air pollution.
