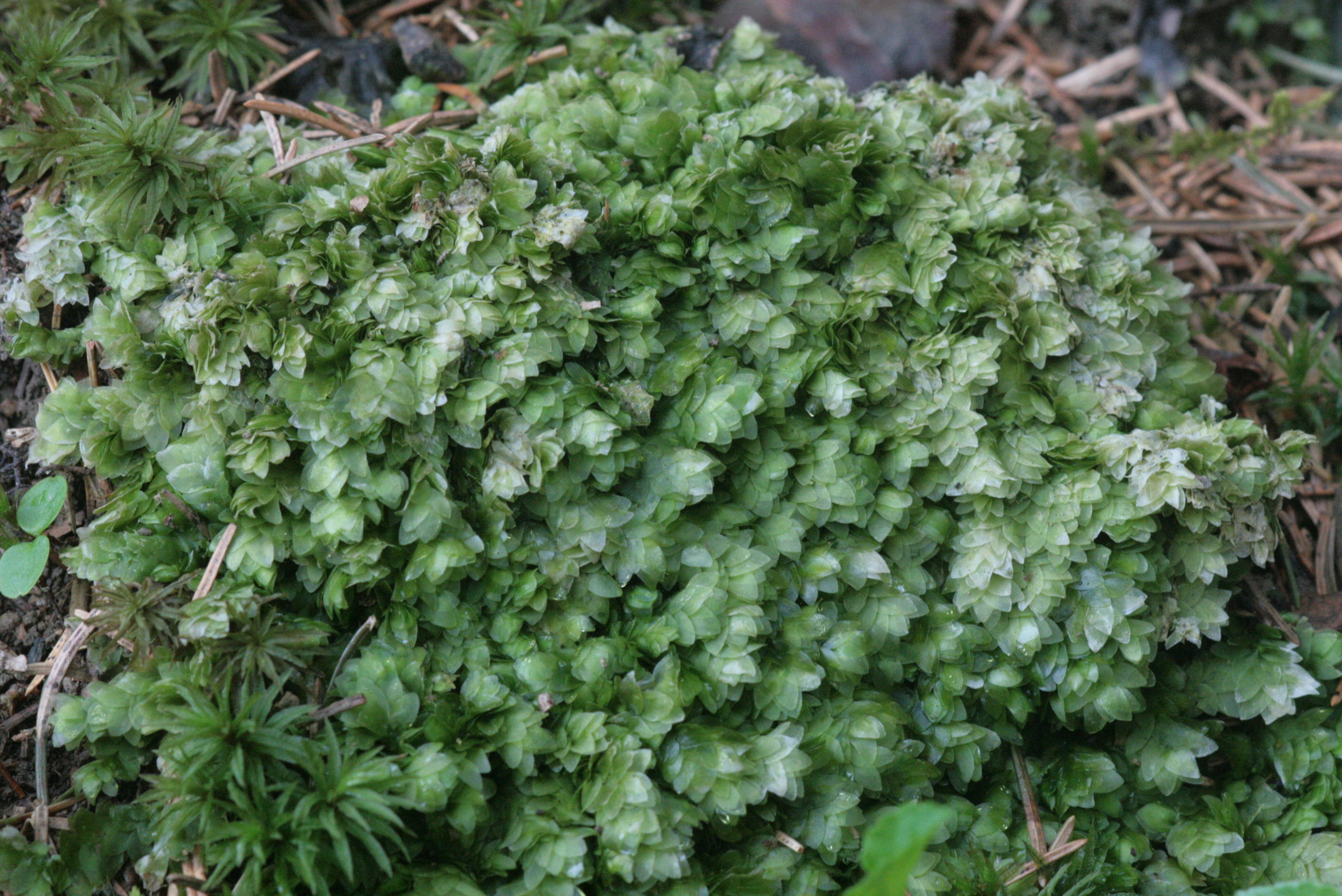
- Hookeria lucens

Scientific classification
- Kingdom: Plantae
- Division: Bryophyta
- Class: Bryopsida
- Subclass: Bryidae
- Order: Hookeriales
- Family: Hookeriaceae
- Genus: Hookeria; Sm., 1808

= Hookeria =

Genus of mosses

Hookeria is a genus of mainly tropical mosses. It was defined by James Edward Smith in 1808 and named for William Jackson Hooker.

There are nine species recognised in the genus Hookeria, the most broadly distributed being Hookeria lucens and Hookeria acutifolia.
