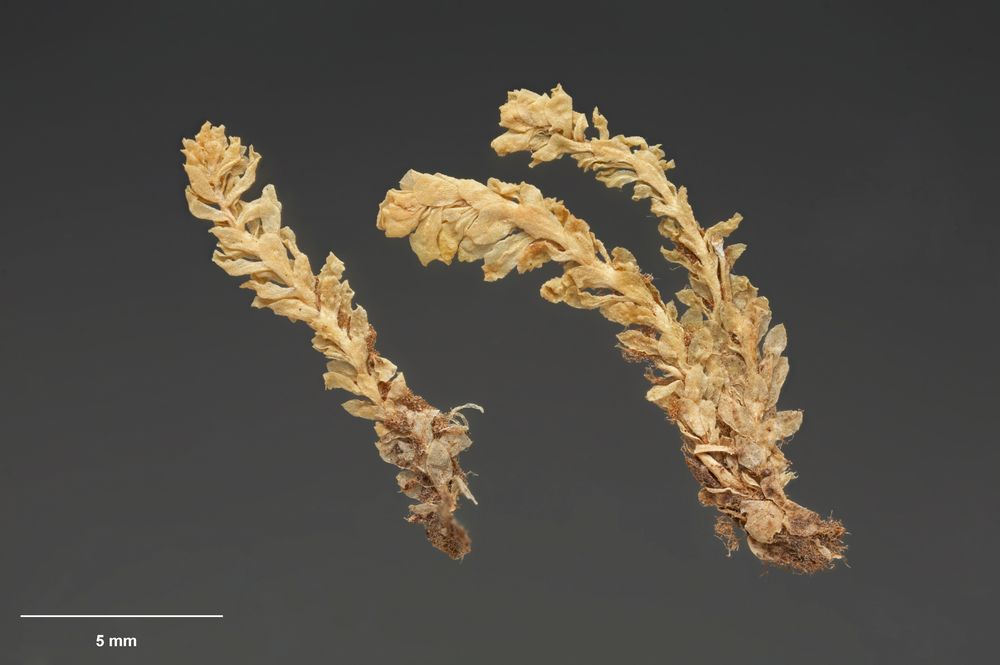
- Beeveria distichophylloides shoots (collected by Dr Donald Petrie in 1892)

Conservation status
- Naturally Uncommon (NZ TCS)

Scientific classification
- Kingdom: Plantae
- Division: Bryophyta
- Class: Bryopsida
- Subclass: Bryidae
- Order: Hookeriales
- Family: Daltoniaceae
- Genus: Beeveria; Fife
- Species: B. distichophylloides

Binomial name
- Beeveria distichophylloides (Broth. & Dixon) Fife

= Beeveria =

Genus of mosses

Beeveria is a genus of moss endemic to New Zealand, in the family Daltoniaceae. It is a monotypic genus with characteristics of the type species, including solely the species Beeveria distichophylloides. The name honours the New Zealand bryologist Jessica Eleanor Beever.

== Habitat ==
Beeveria distichophylloides is saxicolous and grows in a wide variety of places in lowland to montane forests. It favours calcareous rocks such as limestone and can be mainly found growing in cave entrances, along the side of shaded streams, and in ravines and gorges. It has, however, been found on logs and even on the base of trees. Beeveria distichophylloides also prefers areas with high rainfall and enjoys growing on damp surfaces.

== Distribution ==
Endemic to New Zealand and found in the North, South, and Chatham Islands.
