= Ephemeropsis =

Ephemeropsis may refer to:

- Ephemeropsis (mayfly), a fossil genus of mayflies in the family Hexgenitidae
- Ephemeropsis (plant), a genus of mosses in the family Daltoniaceae
