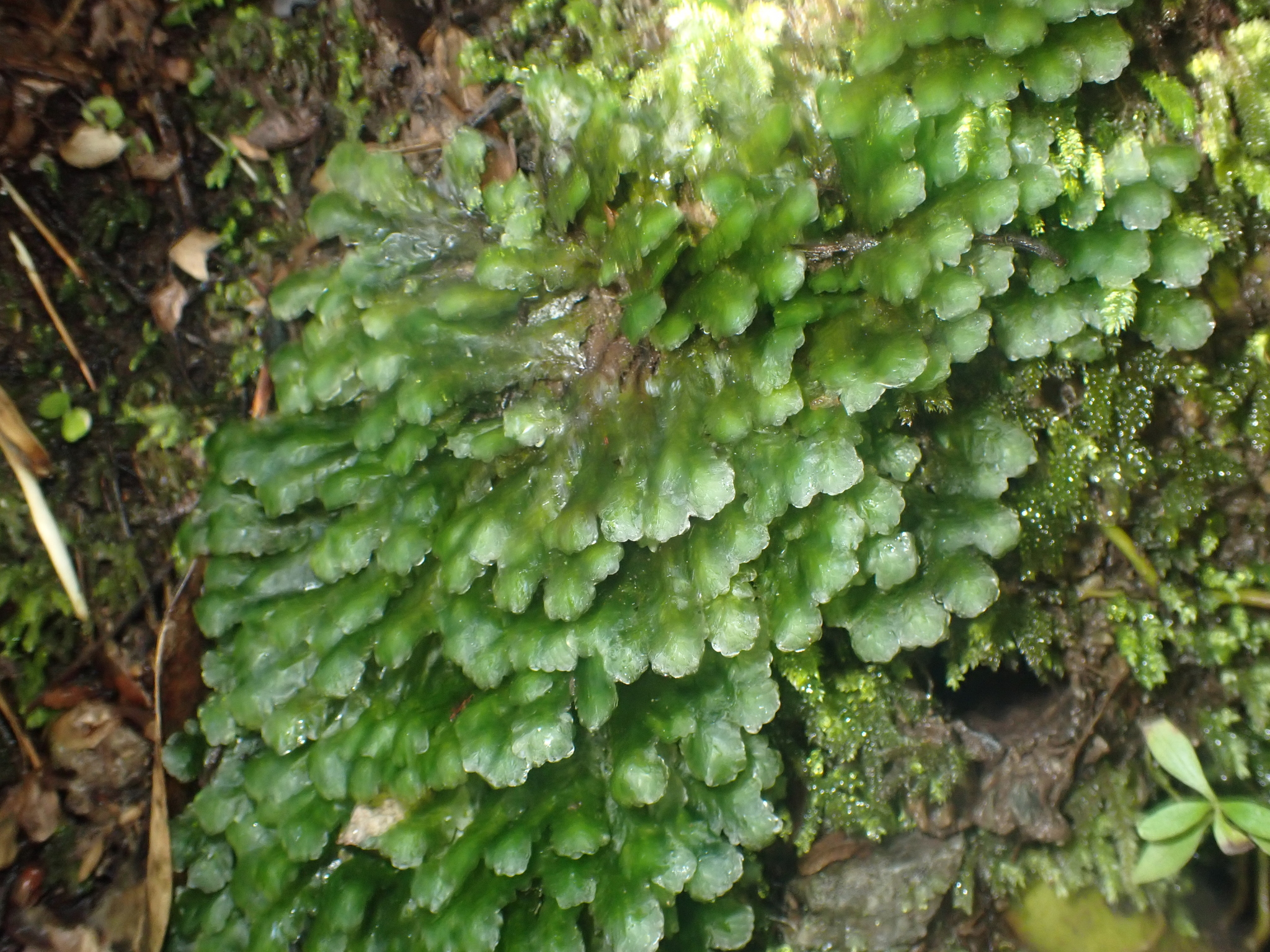
- Distichophyllum microcarpum

Scientific classification
- Kingdom: Plantae
- Division: Bryophyta
- Class: Bryopsida
- Subclass: Bryidae
- Order: Hookeriales
- Family: Daltoniaceae
- Genus: Distichophyllum; Dozy & Molk.

Synonyms
- Discophyllum Mitt.; Mniadelphus Müll. Hal.

= Distichophyllum =

Genus of mosses

Distichophyllum is a genus of mosses belonging to the family Daltoniaceae. The species of this genus are found in New Zealand.

== Species ==
The following species are recognised in the genus Distichophyllum:

- Distichophyllum aciphyllum Dixon
- Distichophyllum albomarginatum D.H. Norris & T.J. Kop.
- Distichophyllum angustifolium Dixon
- Distichophyllum angustissimum Dixon
- Distichophyllum apiculigerum Broth. & Paris
- Distichophyllum armatum (E.B. Bartram) B.C. Ho & L. Pokorny
- Distichophyllum assimile Broth.
- Distichophyllum borneense Broth.
- Distichophyllum brevicuspis M. Fleisch.
- Distichophyllum capillatum Mitt.
- Distichophyllum catinifolium J. Froehl.
- Distichophyllum ceylanicum (Mitt.) Paris
- Distichophyllum chenii B.C. Ho
- Distichophyllum collenchymatosum Cardot
- Distichophyllum crispulum (Hook. f. & Wilson) Mitt.
- Distichophyllum cuspidatum (Dozy & Molk.) Dozy & Molk.
- Distichophyllum decolyi Gangulee
- Distichophyllum denticulatum Dixon
- Distichophyllum dicksonii (Hook. & Grev.) Mitt.
- Distichophyllum dixonii Herzog
- Distichophyllum ellipticum Herzog
- Distichophyllum eremitae (A. Jaeger) Paris
- Distichophyllum evanidolimbatum M. Fleisch.
- Distichophyllum fasciculatum Mitt.
- Distichophyllum fernandezianum Broth.
- Distichophyllum flaccidum (Hook. f. & Wilson) Mitt.
- Distichophyllum flavescens (Mitt.) Paris
- Distichophyllum fossombronioides Thér.
- Distichophyllum francii Thér.
- Distichophyllum freycinetii (Schwägr.) Mitt.
- Distichophyllum gracile Ångstr.
- Distichophyllum graeffeanum (Müll. Hal.) Broth.
- Distichophyllum grandifolium Matteri
- Distichophyllum griffithii (Mitt.) Paris
- Distichophyllum hainanense (P.J. Lin & B.C. Tan) B.C. Ho & L. Pokorny
- Distichophyllum humifusum (Wilson ex Mitt.) Paris
- Distichophyllum imbricatum Mitt.
- Distichophyllum jungermannioides (Müll. Hal.) Bosch & Sande Lac.
- Distichophyllum kinabaluense Nog. & Z. Iwats.
- Distichophyllum koghiense Thér.
- Distichophyllum leiopogon Dixon
- Distichophyllum leskeodontoides D.H. Norris & T.J. Kop.
- Distichophyllum limpidum Thwaites & Mitt.
- Distichophyllum lingulatum E.B. Bartram
- Distichophyllum lixii (Broth.) Thér.
- Distichophyllum longicuspis Broth.
- Distichophyllum longobasis M. Fleisch.
- Distichophyllum lorianum M. Fleisch.
- Distichophyllum madurense Thér. & P. de la Varde
- Distichophyllum malayense Damanhuri & Mohamed
- Distichophyllum mascarenicum Besch.
- Distichophyllum microcarpum (Hedw.) Mitt.
- Distichophyllum microcladum (Colenso) Broth. ex Paris
- Distichophyllum minutum Müll. Hal.
- Distichophyllum mittenii Bosch & Sande Lac.
- Distichophyllum mniifolium (Hornsch.) Sim
- Distichophyllum montagneanum (Müll. Hal.) Bosch & Sande Lac.
- Distichophyllum nadeaudii Besch.
- Distichophyllum nanospathulatum Herzog
- Distichophyllum nidulans Herzog
- Distichophyllum nigricaule Mitt. ex Bosch & Sande Lac.
- Distichophyllum noguchianum B.C. Tan
- Distichophyllum oblongum B.C. Tan & P.J. Lin
- Distichophyllum obovatum (Griff.) Paris
- Distichophyllum obtusifolium Thér.
- Distichophyllum osterwaldii M. Fleisch.
- Distichophyllum paradoxum (Mont.) Mitt.
- Distichophyllum patagonicum Besch.
- Distichophyllum procumbens Mitt.
- Distichophyllum pseudomalayense T.Y. Chiang & C.M. Kuo
- Distichophyllum pulchellum (Hampe) Mitt.
- Distichophyllum rakotomariae Crosby
- Distichophyllum rigidicaule (Dusén) Broth.
- Distichophyllum rotundifolium (Hook. f. & Wilson) Müll. Hal. & Broth.
- Distichophyllum samoanum M. Fleisch.
- Distichophyllum santosii E.B. Bartram
- Distichophyllum schmidtii Broth.
- Distichophyllum semimarginatum Thér.
- Distichophyllum shevockii B.C. Tan, Ochyra, B.C. Ho & Bedn.-Ochyra
- Distichophyllum spathulatum (Dozy & Molk.) Dozy & Molk.
- Distichophyllum stipitatifolium M. Fleisch.
- Distichophyllum subelimbatum Broth.
- Distichophyllum submersum Matteri
- Distichophyllum submucronatum M. Fleisch.
- Distichophyllum subnigricaule Broth.
- Distichophyllum succulentum (Mitt.) Broth.
- Distichophyllum telmaphila Colenso
- Distichophyllum theriotianum Matteri
- Distichophyllum tortile Dozy & Molk. ex Bosch & Sande Lac.
- Distichophyllum turgidum E.B. Bartram
- Distichophyllum undulatum Dozy & Molk. ex Bosch & Sande Lac.
- Distichophyllum vitianum (Sull.) Mitt.
- Distichophyllum yakumontanum H. Akiyama & Matsui
