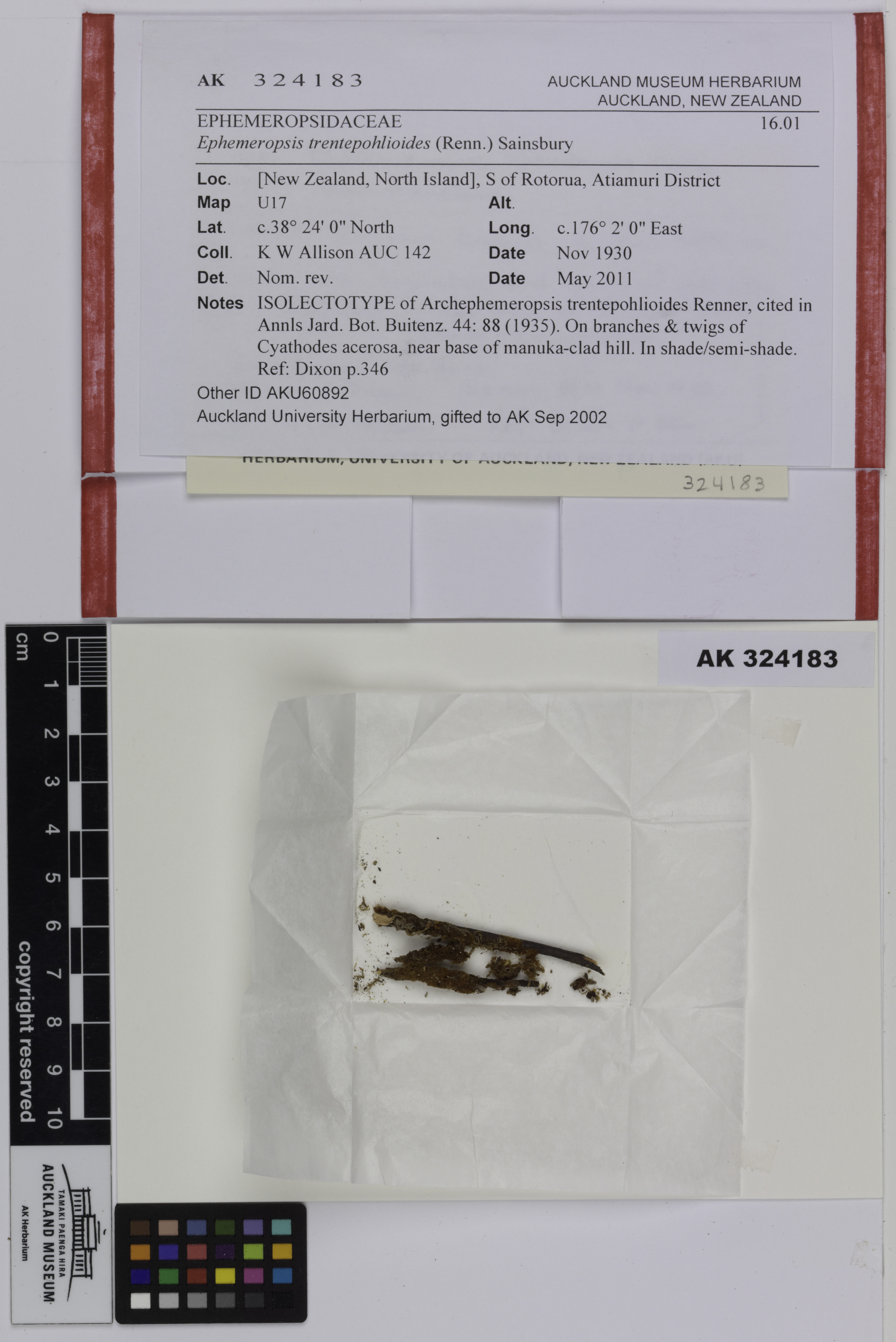
- Ephemeropsis trentepohlioides

Scientific classification
- Kingdom: Plantae
- Division: Bryophyta
- Class: Bryopsida
- Subclass: Bryidae
- Order: Hookeriales
- Family: Hookeriaceae
- Genus: Ephemeropsis; K.I.Goebel

= Ephemeropsis (plant) =

Genus of mosses

Ephemeropsis is a genus of mosses belonging to the family Hookeriaceae.

The species of this genus are found in Australasia.

Species:

- Ephemeropsis tjibodensis Goebel, 1892
- Ephemeropsis trentepohlioides Sainsbury, 1951
