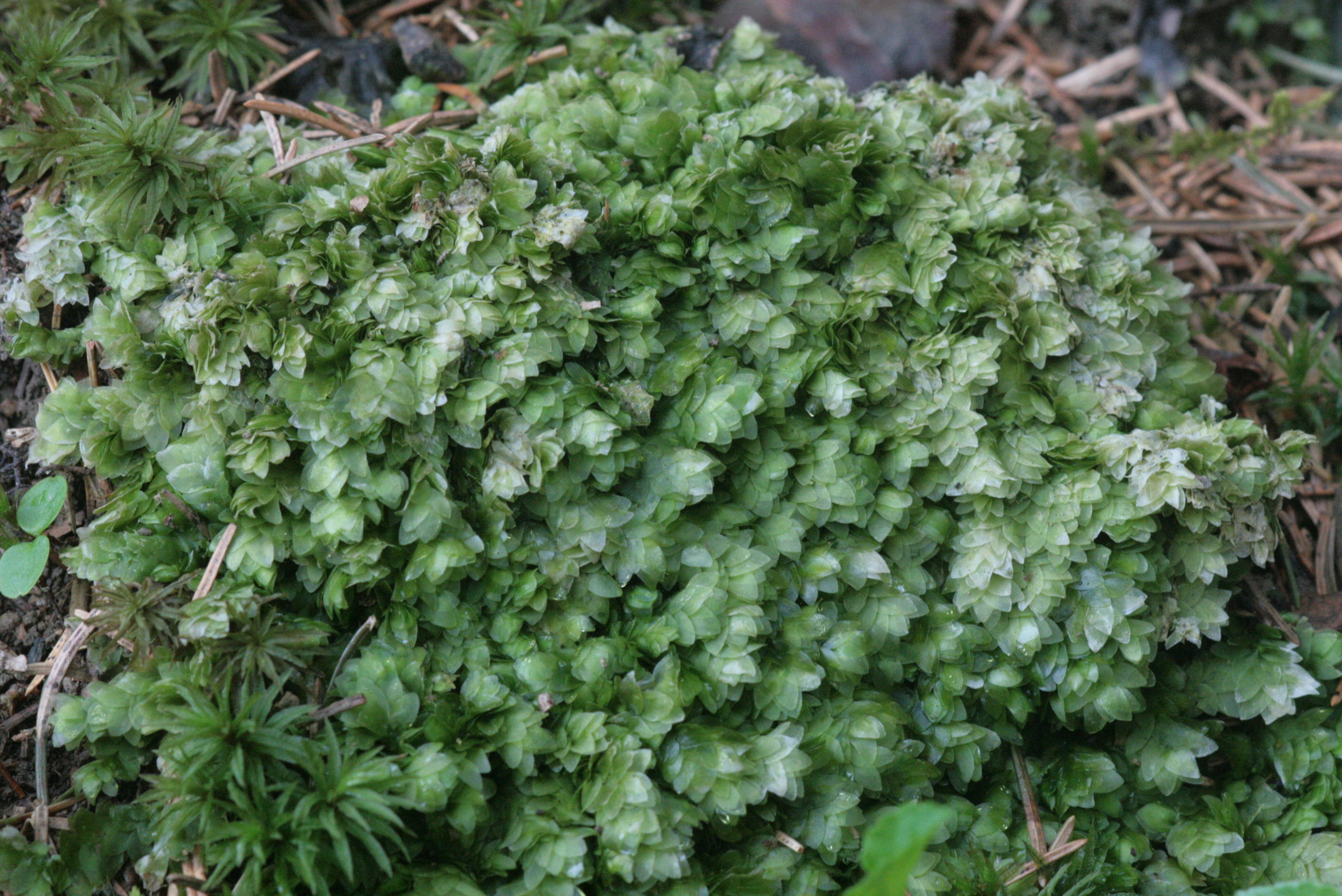

Conservation status
- Least Concern (IUCN 3.1) (Europe regional assessment)

- Secure (NatureServe)

Scientific classification
- Kingdom: Plantae
- Division: Bryophyta
- Class: Bryopsida
- Subclass: Bryidae
- Order: Hookeriales
- Family: Hookeriaceae
- Genus: Hookeria
- Species: H. lucens

Binomial name
- Hookeria lucens (Hedw.) Sm.

Synonyms
- Hypnum lucens Hedw.; Leskea lucens (Hedw.) DC.; Pterygophyllum lucens (Hedw.) Brid.

= Hookeria lucens =

Species of moss

Hookeria lucens, the shining hookeria, is a species of moss in the family Hookeriaceae. It is native to Europe, east to the Caucasus, Turkey and China, as well as Scandinavia and the Faeroe Islands and western North America.

== Description ==
Hookeria lucens is a medium to large-sized moss that grows in creeping mats or patches. The plant has a distinctive transparent or glass-like appearance when wet, due to its large, lax cells that can be seen even with a hand lens. The stems are green, fleshy, and succulent, typically growing 1–5 cm (0.39–1.97 in) long (occasionally reaching 7.5 cm (3.0 in)), with sparse and irregular branching. They display a flattened (complanate) arrangement of leaves along the stem. The plant appears whitish to light green or pale yellow in colour, and becomes somewhat contorted when dry.

The leaves are arranged in a distinctive pattern, with the leaves on the upper (dorsal) side of the stem often being broader and more symmetrical than those on the sides. Each leaf is broad and completely lacks a midrib (costa), which is unusual among mosses. The leaves have rounded-obtuse tips and smooth, unbordered edges. A distinctive feature of H. lucens is the presence of scattered pairs of smaller cells throughout the leaf, with one cell of each pair being relatively smaller and square-shaped. The cells along the leaf margin are the same width as those in the middle of the leaf.

When reproducing, the species produces red to blackish stalks (setae) that are 1–2 cm (0.39–0.79 in) long (occasionally reaching 2.5 cm (0.98 in)). These stalks bear capsules (spore-containing structures) that are oblong-cylindrical or ellipsoid in shape and 1.5–2 mm long. A distinctive characteristic is that these capsules become strongly contracted below the mouth when dry. The capsules mature from late fall to spring, protected by a short, cone-shaped cap (calyptra) that is 2–2.5 mm long. The spores are smooth to minutely bumpy and measure 10–17 μm (0.010–0.017 mm) in diameter.

The species can also reproduce asexually through specialised filaments that grow among the rhizoids (root-like structures) at the tips of leaves. These filaments are unbranched, composed of a single row of cells, and have a slightly rough surface.

Hookeria lucens is notable for accumulating an unusual variety of mineral deposits within its cells, including bohemite, calcite, and quartz – a characteristic rarely observed in mosses and thought to result from the plant's interaction with soil minerals through biomineralisation processes.

== Habitat, distribution, and ecology ==
Hookeria lucens is predominantly a species of temperate regions, with a distribution across the Northern Hemisphere. In North America, it is found along the Pacific coast and adjacent areas, specifically in Alaska, British Columbia, Washington, Oregon, California, and Idaho. Outside North America, the species occurs in Europe, western Asia, and Atlantic Islands.

The species shows a strong preference for humid, coastal environments and typically grows at low to moderate elevations, generally from sea level to about 500 m (1,600 ft). It is particularly associated with the Pacific Northwest's coastal rainforest ecosystems, where it can be found in several distinctive habitat types. These habitats include coastal islands and their adjacent mainland areas, ravines and river systems (particularly near pools), swampy margins of lakes, and raised bogs where it grows in peaty, waterlogged soil.

Hookeria lucens grows in wet evergreen woodlands, showing a particular affinity for forests dominated by alder (Alnus), Port Orford cedar (Chamaecyparis), western hemlock (Tsuga), coast redwood (Sequoia sempervirens), and Sitka spruce. The species also colonises old, decaying logs in heathland environments, demonstrating its ability to grow on both soil and woody substrates. Its preference for these consistently moist, often shaded environments reflects its need for high humidity and protection from direct sunlight, conditions typical of the Pacific Northwest's temperate rainforest ecosystems. The timing of its reproductive cycle appears to be coordinated with the wet seasons of its habitat, with spore-containing capsules typically maturing from late fall through spring, coinciding with the Pacific Northwest's rainiest period.
