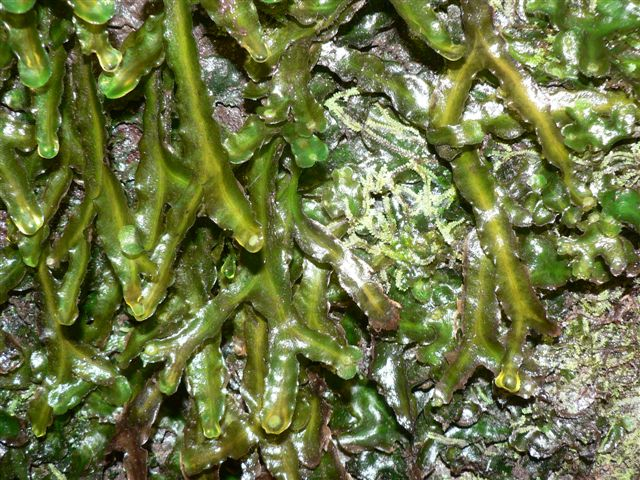

Scientific classification
- Kingdom: Plantae
- Division: Bryophyta
- Class: Bryopsida
- Subclass: Bryidae
- Order: Hookeriales
- Family: Daltoniaceae; Schimp.

Genera
- See text.

Synonyms
- Adelotheciaceae

= Daltoniaceae =

Family of mosses

Daltoniaceae is a family of moss in the order Hookeriales.

== Taxonomy ==
Family Daltoniaceae contains the following genera:

- Achrophyllum Vitt & Crosby
- Adelothecium Mitt.
- Beeveria Fife
- Benitotania H. Akiyama, T. Yamag. & Suleiman
- Bryobrothera Thér.
- Calyptrochaeta Desv.
- Crosbya Vitt
- Daltonia Hook. & Taylor
- Distichophyllidium M. Fleisch.
- Distichophyllum Dozy & Molk.
- Ephemeropsis K. I. Goebel
- Leskeodon Broth.
- Leskeodontopsis Zanten
- Metadistichophyllum Nog. & Z. Iwats.
