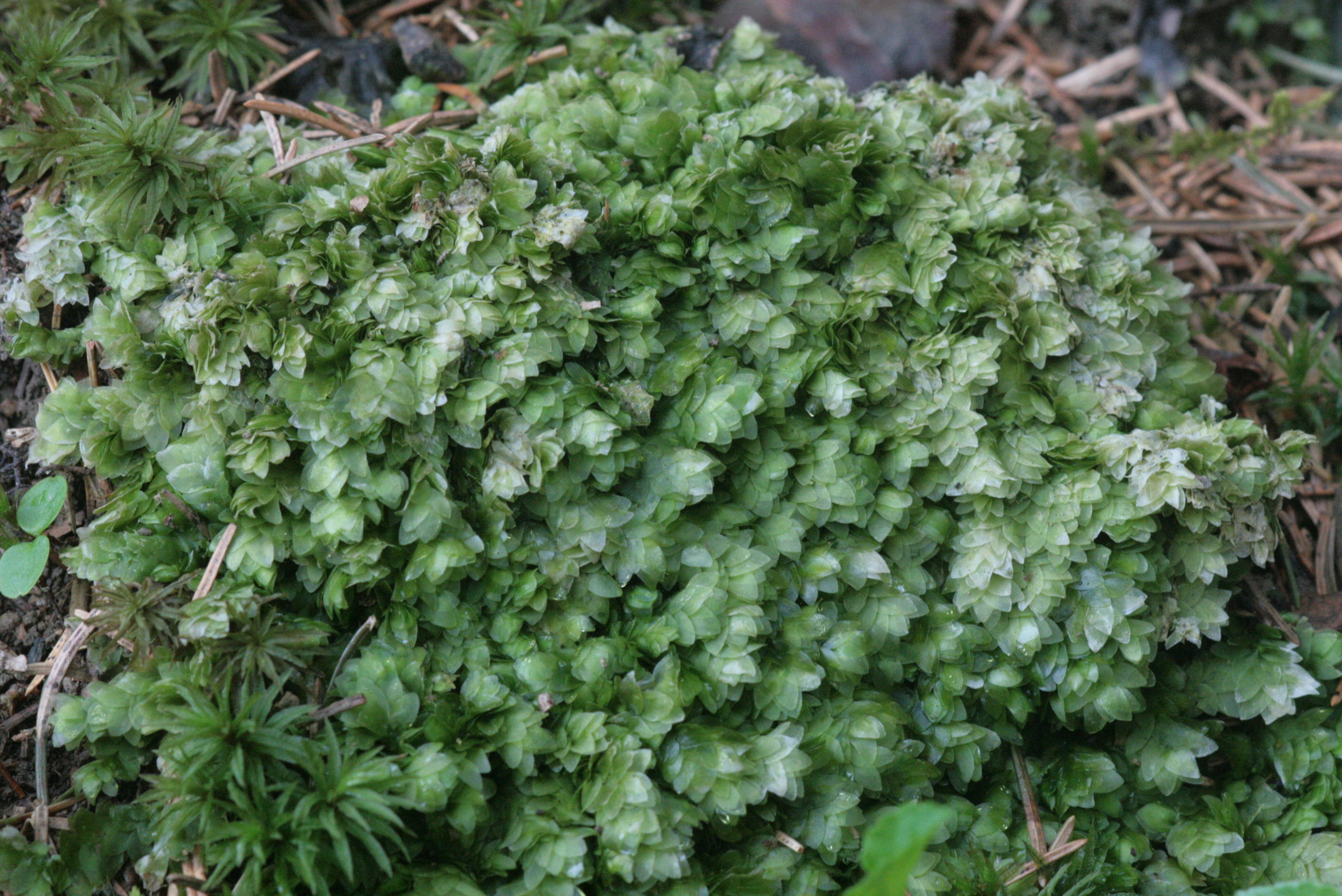
- Hookeria lucens

Scientific classification
- Kingdom: Plantae
- Division: Bryophyta
- Class: Bryopsida
- Subclass: Bryidae
- Order: Hookeriales
- Family: Hookeriaceae; Schimp.

= Hookeriaceae =

Family of mosses

The Hookeriaceae is a family of mainly tropical mosses of the order Hookeriales.

One species of the family is present in the UK.

== Genera ==
There are only two genera in the family:

- Crossomitrium Müll. Hal.
- Hookeria Sm.

The validity of including Crossomitrium in the Hookeriaceae is uncertain; it may warrant segregation in a family of its own.
