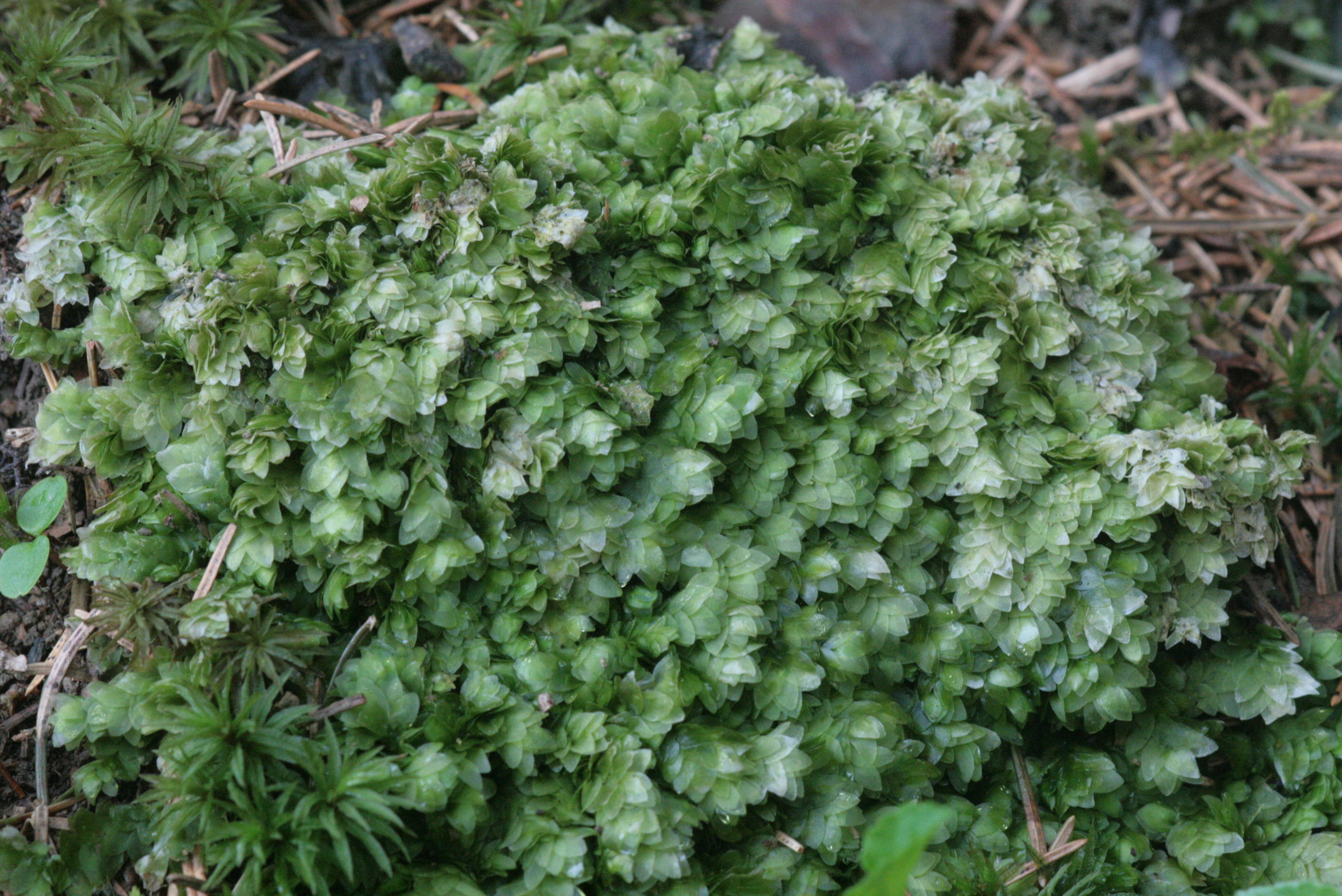
- Hookeria lucens

Scientific classification
- Kingdom: Plantae
- Division: Bryophyta
- Class: Bryopsida
- Subclass: Bryidae
- Superorder: Hypnanae
- Order: Hookeriales

Families
- See text.

= Hookeriales =

Order of mosses

Hookeriales is an order of Bryophyta or leafy mosses. Named for William Jackson Hooker, it is composed of mainly subtropical and tropical species of mosses with generally complanate and asymmetrical leaves.

== Families ==
Hookeriales comprises the following families:

- Daltoniaceae
- Hookeriaceae
- Hypopterygiaceae
- Leucomiaceae
- Pilotrichaceae
- Saulomataceae
- Schimperobryaceae
